= 1924 in art =

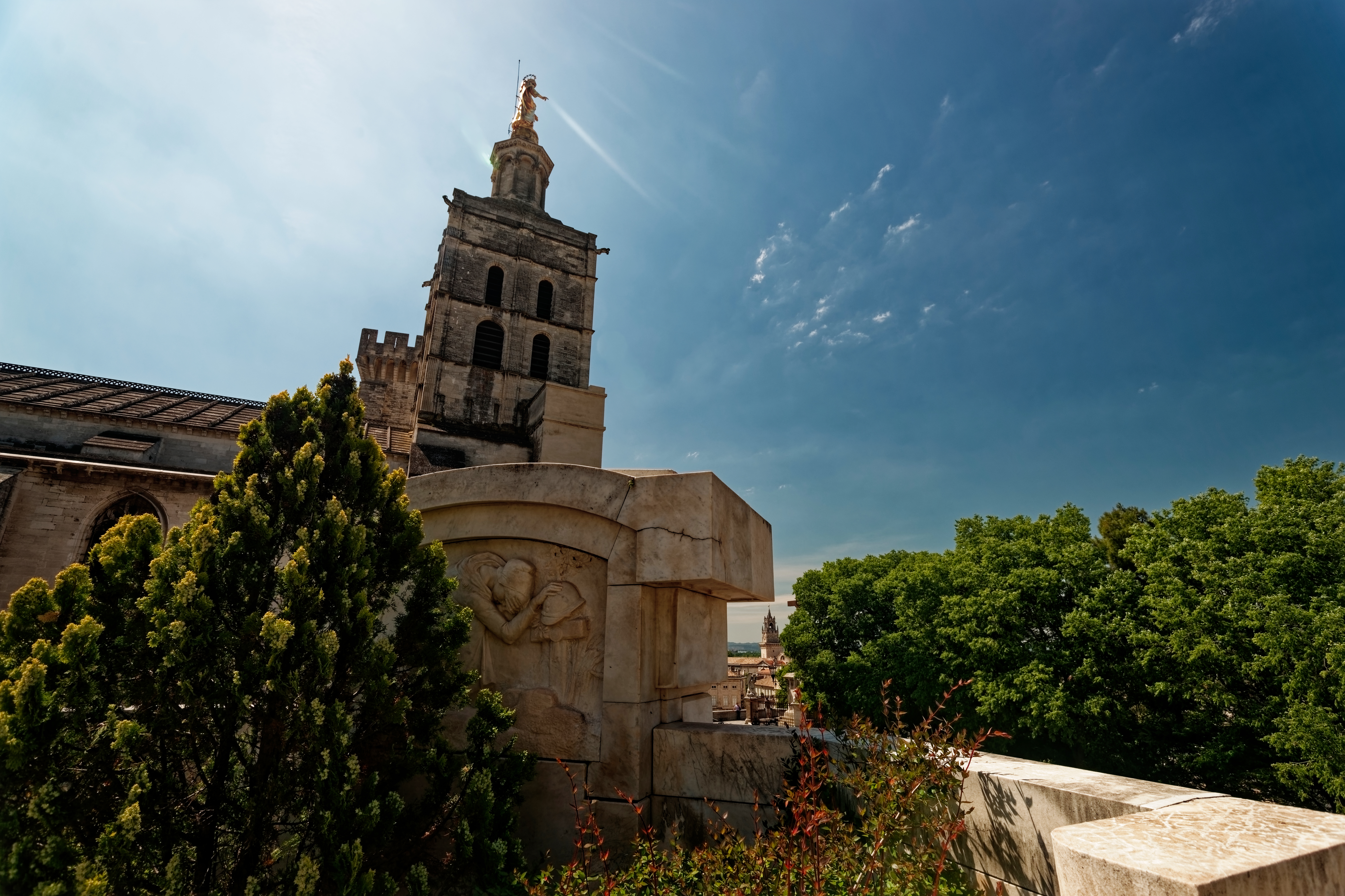
View South on Art Déco WWI-Monument 1924 by Louis Botinelly, Cathédrale Notre-Dame des Doms d'Avignon & gilded statue of Virgin Mary 1859

Events from the year 1924 in art.

== Events ==
- February – El Lissitzky enters a Swiss sanatorium, suffering from tuberculosis.
- March – Exhibition Alfred Stieglitz Presents Fifty-One Recent Pictures: Oils, Water-colors, Pastels, Drawings, by Georgia O'Keeffe (together with a display of his photographs) opens at the Anderson Galleries in New York City.
- May 15 – Juan Gris delivers his lecture Des possibilités de la peinture at the University of Paris.
- July 9 – American painters Edward Hopper and Josephine Nivison marry at the French evangelical church in New York City; Guy Pène du Bois attends.
- August – English artist and designer Eric Gill moves with some of his artistic community from Ditchling in East Sussex to the disused Llanthony Abbey at Capel-y-ffin in Wales.
- September 24 – Première of the Dadaist post-Cubist Futurist experimental art film Ballet Mécanique conceived, written and co-directed by the painter Fernand Léger in collaboration with Dudley Murphy and Man Ray at the Internationale Ausstellung neuer Theatertechnik (International Exposition for New Theater Technique) in Vienna presented by Frederick Kiesler. It features Alice Prin ("Kiki de Montparnasse") and has a musical score by American composer George Antheil but is presented in a silent version on this occasion.
- December – The Bucharest International Modern Art Exhibit, an avant-garde event hosted by Contimporanul, displaying works by Constantin Brâncuși, Hans Arp, Paul Klee, János Mattis-Teutsch, Kurt Schwitters, Michel Seuphor, Milița Petrașcu, Marcel Janco, Victor Brauner, and M. H. Maxy.
- December 11 – Alfred Stieglitz and Georgia O'Keeffe marry.
- The Surrealist Manifesto is conceived.
- Sir Frank Brangwyn is commissioned to paint the British Empire Panels, intended for the Royal Gallery in the House of Lords in the Palace of Westminster, but eventually inaugurated in the Brangwyn Hall at the Guildhall, Swansea, in 1934.
- Vilmos Aba Novák's works are on display for the first time.
- Fernand Léger and Amédée Ozenfant open a common studio.
- Ben Nicholson begins to paint abstracts.

== Awards ==
- Archibald Prize: William Beckwith McInnes – Portrait of Miss Collins
- Art competitions at the 1924 Summer Olympics – painting: Jean Jacoby
- Tagea Brandt Rejselegat: Anna Ancher

== Works ==
=== Paintings ===
- Tarsila do Amaral – Estação de Ferro Central do Brasil
- George Bellows
  - Dempsey and Firpo
  - My House Woodstock
- Romaine Brooks – Una, Lady Troubridge
- Carlo Carrà – San Giacomo di Varallo
- Marc Chagall – Green Violinist
- Lovis Corinth – Big self-portrait on the Walchensee
- Otto Dix – Portrait of the Art Dealer Johanna Ey
- Edwin Holgate – Portrait of Albert Henry Stewart Gillson
- Edward Hopper – New York Pavements
- A. Y. Jackson – In Jasper Park
- David Jones – The Garden Enclosed
- Wassily Kandinsky – Contrasting Sounds
- Paul Klee
  - Asiatic God
  - Carnival in the Mountains
  - Flower Garden
- Fernand Léger – Elément Mécanique
- Kazimir Malevich – Black Circle
- Joan Miró
  - The Tilled Field
  - Le Piège
  - Head of a Catalan Peasant (sequence commenced)
  - Portrait de Madame K
- C.R.W. Nevinson – Victoria Embankment
- Emil Nolde – Madonna with Begonia
- William Orpen – Self Portrait, Multiple Mirrors
- Pascin – Portrait of Pierre Mac Orlan
- Samuel John Peploe – Roses in a White Vase with Fruit
- Diego Rivera – Day of the Dead and other frescos at the Ministry of Education building (Mexico City)
- Philippe Robert – Frescos at Biel/Bienne railway station
- Charles Sheeler – MacDougal Alley
- Mario Sironi – L'allieva
- Nicolae Tonitza – The Forester's Daughter
- Raymond Wintz – The Blue Door (Un coin du port a Doelan)

=== Photographs ===
- Man Ray – Le Violon d'Ingres

=== Sculptures ===
- Amory's Tribute to the Heroes of 1861–1865
- Joaquín Bilbao – Ferdinand III of Castile (equestrian, Seville)
- Constantin Brâncuși
  - Bird in Space (early version)
  - The Cock
- Charles Keck – Liberty Monument (Ticonderoga, New York)
- Eric Kennington – 24th East Surrey Division War Memorial (Battersea Park, London)
- Augustus Lukeman – Francis Asbury (equestrian, Washington, D.C.)
- Paul Manship – Statue of Diana (Hudson River Museum, Yonkers)
- Andrew O'Connor – Lafayette Monument (Baltimore, Maryland)
- Albin Polasek – Theodore Thomas Memorial (Chicago)
- Alexander Phimister Proctor – Indian Maiden and Fawn (Eugene, Oregon)
- Gertrude Vanderbilt Whitney – Buffalo Bill – The Scout

== Births ==
- 3 January – André Franquin, Belgian comics artist (d. 1997).
- 5 January – Vera Molnár, Hungarian media artist (d. 2023).
- 28 January – George Papassavas, Greek-American painter
- 29 January
  - Marcelle Ferron, Canadian painter and stained glass artist (d. 2001).
  - Peter Voulkos, American sculptor and academic (d. 2002).
- 6 February – John Richardson, English-born art historian (d. 2019).
- 2 March – Co Westerik, Dutch visual artist (d. 2018)
- 7 March – Eduardo Paolozzi, Scottish sculptor and artist (d. 2005).
- 8 March – Anthony Caro, English sculptor (d. 2013).
- 13 March – Paul Brach, American abstract painter, lecturer and educator (d. 2007).
- 30 March – Robert Dickerson, Australian figurative painter (d. 2015).
- 10 April – Kenneth Noland, American painter (d. 2010).
- 14 April – Robert Stewart, Scottish textile designer (d. 1995)
- 20 June – Fritz Koenig, German sculptor (d. 2017).
- 22 June – Dorothy Bohm, Russian-born British photographer (d. 2023).
- 26 June – Andrew Martz, Russian animal sculptor (d. 2002).
- 7 August – Georges Lévis, French comic artist (d. 1988).
- 8 August – Edouard Jaguer, French poet and art critic (d. 2006).
- 29 August – Jack Baer, British art dealer (d. 2016).
- 4 September – Anita Snellman, Finnish painter (d. 2006)
- 21 September – David Sylvester, English art critic and curator (d. 2001).
- 22 September – Charles Keeping, English illustrator, children's book author and lithographer (d. 1988).
- 19 November – Knut Steen, Norwegian sculptor (d. 2011).
- 26 November – George Segal, American painter and sculptor (d. 2000).
- 7 December – Liisi Beckmann, Finnish artist and designer (d. 2004).
- 12 December – Nandor Glid, Yugoslav and Serbian sculptor (d. 1997).
- 17 December – Clifton Pugh, Australian artist (d. 1990).
- 24 December – Nissim Ezekiel, Indian poet, playwright and art critic (d. 2004).
- 24 December – Michael Goldberg, American abstract expressionist painter and teacher (d. 2007).
- date unknown
  - Art Brenner, American painter and sculptor (d. 2013).
  - William Henry Burns, Northern Irish artist (d. 1995).
  - Jamil Hamoudi, Iraqi painter (d. 2003).
  - Robert Ortlieb, American sculptor (d. 2011).

== Deaths ==
- February 1 – Maurice Prendergast, American painter (b. 1858)
- February 11 – Jean-François Raffaëlli, French realist painter, sculptor and printmaker (b. 1850)
- March 4 – Fanny Eaton, Jamaican-born artists' model (b. 1835)
- March 9 – Daniel Ridgway Knight, American painter (b. 1839)
- April 3 – Franz von Bayros, Austrian erotic artist and illustrator (b. 1866)
- April 5 – Victor David Brenner, American medalist, sculptor and engraver (b. 1871)
- April 18 – Frank X. Leyendecker, American illustrator (b. 1877)
- April 22 – Sir James Lawton Wingate, Scottish landscape painter (b. 1846)
- May 2 – Anna Palm de Rosa, Swedish-born painter (b. 1859)
- May 26 - F. W. Pomeroy, English sculptor (b. 1856)
- May 30 – Amélie Beaury-Saurel, French painter (b. 1849)
- June 14 – Emile Claus, Belgian painter (b. 1849)
- July 12 – Henrietta Ward, English painter (b. 1832)
- August 19 – Ferdinand Cheval, French naïve architect of the "Palais Idéal" (b. 1836)
- November 2 – Kai Nielsen, Danish sculptor (b. 1882)
- November 7 – Hans Thoma, German painter (b. 1839)
- December 21 – Francesco Negri, Italian photographer (b. 1841)
- December 23 – Christopher Whall, English stained-glass artist (b. 1849)
- December 28 – Léon Bakst, Russian painter and theatrical designer (b. 1866)
- December 31 – Tomioka Tessai, Japanese painter and calligrapher in Meiji period (b. 1837)

== See also ==
- 1924 in fine arts of the Soviet Union
