= Indian Maiden and Fawn =

Sculpture by Alexander Phimister Proctor

- The sculpture in the basement of the Jordan Schnitzer Museum of Art in 2015
- Artist: Alexander Phimister Proctor
- Year: 1917–1924
- Type: Sculpture
- Location: United States: Newton, Iowa; Eugene, Oregon; Cody, Wyoming

Indian Maiden and Fawn is a 1917–1924 sculpture by Alexander Phimister Proctor.

== Description and history ==
Alexander Phimister Proctor's figural group Indian Maiden and Fawn (1917–1924) is a sculpture depicting a standing nude Native American female with a fawn standing to her right. She wears a headband and braids, and holds out food for the deer in her left hand.

There exist several copies of the sculpture. One copy, made of yellow-leaded brass, is installed within the Jasper County Historical Museum in Newton, Iowa. Fonderia Bruno served as the founder of this statue.

The Jordan Schnitzer Museum of Art, located on the University of Oregon campus in Eugene, Oregon, has a 74-inch (190 cm) bronze copy, dated 1926. It was gifted by Narcissa J. Washburne and the Carl Washburne estate in 1962. The statue used to be installed outside the museum until it was overturned by vandals in 1980. Despite being insured and most recently appraised for $12,000, museum officials were uncertain if they could restore the woman's arm, which had broken off.

The Buffalo Bill Center of the West in Cody, Wyoming also has a bronze copy in its collection.

In 2001, Christie's sold a 21-inch (53 cm) copy of the sculpture, estimated to be worth between $20,000 and $30,000, for $19,975.

== See also ==
- 1924 in art
- List of public art in Eugene, Oregon
- The Pioneer (Eugene, Oregon) and The Pioneer Mother (Eugene, Oregon), other sculptures by Proctor
