= Dumbarton Bridge =

Dumbarton Bridge may refer to:

- Dumbarton Bridge (California)
- Dumbarton Bridge (Washington, D.C.)
- Old Dumbarton Bridge, built in 1765 in Dumbarton, Scotland
