= General John Logan Memorial =

Equestrian statue in Chicago, Illinois, U.S.

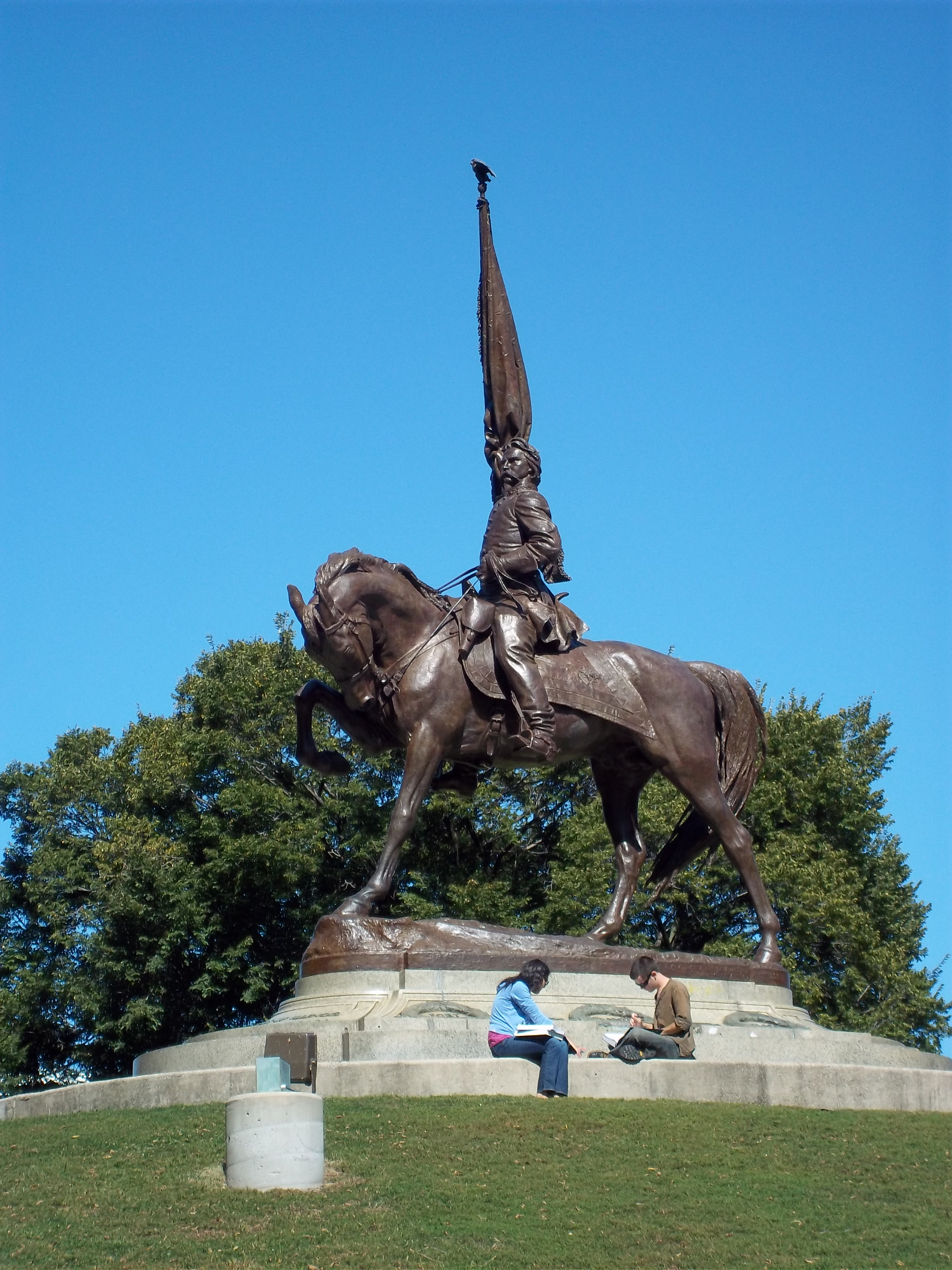
- The sculpture in 2010
- Artist: Augustus Saint-Gaudens; Alexander Phimister Proctor
- Year: 1894–1897
- Medium: Bronze sculpture
- Subject: John A. Logan
- Location: Grant Park, Chicago, Illinois, United States
- 41.87066°N 87.62344°W

General John Logan Memorial, also known as the John Alexander Logan Monument, is an outdoor bronze sculpture commemorating John A. Logan by sculptors Augustus Saint-Gaudens and Alexander Phimister Proctor, in a setting by architect Stanford White. Installed in Chicago's Grant Park, in the U.S. state of Illinois, the statue and pedestal sit atop a memorial mound, with a ceremonial stairway leading to the summit.

The statue was a notable meeting location for anti-Vietnam War protests in the 1960s, including during the 1968 Democratic National Convention.

== History ==
The monument was created during 1894–1897 and dedicated on July 22, 1897. Henry-Bonnard Bronze Company served as the founder, and additional assistance was provided by Daniel H. Burnham, Annette Johnson, and Mary Lawrence Tonetti. The unveiling of the memorial in 1897 was a major event in Chicago. People from across the country attended and the coverage was equally widespread. The dignitaries included Russell A. Alger, Secretary of War represented President McKinley, Governor James A. Mount of Indiana and Governor Silas A. Holcomb of Nebraska. Illinois Governor John Riley Tanner accepted the memorial on behalf of the state of Illinois and an oration was delivered by George R. Peck. Three revenue cutters fired salutes on Lake Michigan and the memorial was unveiled by Logan’s grandson, seven-year-old John A. Logan III.

In 1913, Eugene F. McDonald, a representative of the Anderson Electric Car Co. (and future founder of Zenith Radio Corporation) used the steps leading up the memorial to demonstrate the ability of a Detroit Electric to climb hills for one of his customers. He was arrested for the stunt but made the sale.

In February 1923, the South Park commissioners in Chicago suggested that the Logan Memorial be taken off its mound and put on a pedestal. The mound contains a tomb intended for the General and his wife. Mrs. Logan fought the move, writing letters to the head of the commission. Civil War veterans rallied in support of Mrs. Logan. She died a little over a week later. The statue was never moved.

General and Mrs. Logan were both buried at the U.S. Soldiers’ and Airmen's Home National Cemetery in Washington, DC and have never been returned to Chicago. In 1939 it was reported that the inscription above the vault that read “Within this crypt the mortal remains of the hero are buried” had been chipped away to just a handful of letters by vandals.

In 1968, during the anti-war protests surrounding the Democratic National Convention, demonstrators climbed the statue and organizers spoke from in front of its base.

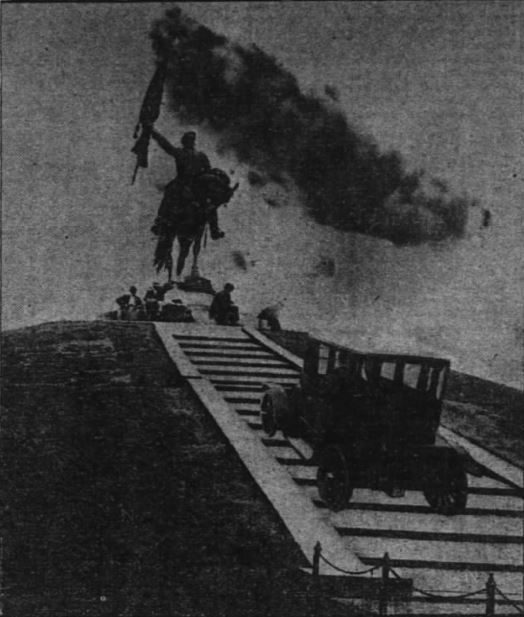
Eugene McDonald climbing the memorial in 1913

The statue was the site of protests during the 1968 Democratic National Convention

== See also ==
- Equestrian statue of John A. Logan, Washington, D.C.
- List of public art in Chicago
