= Joseph Nathan Teal =

American lawyer (1858–1929)

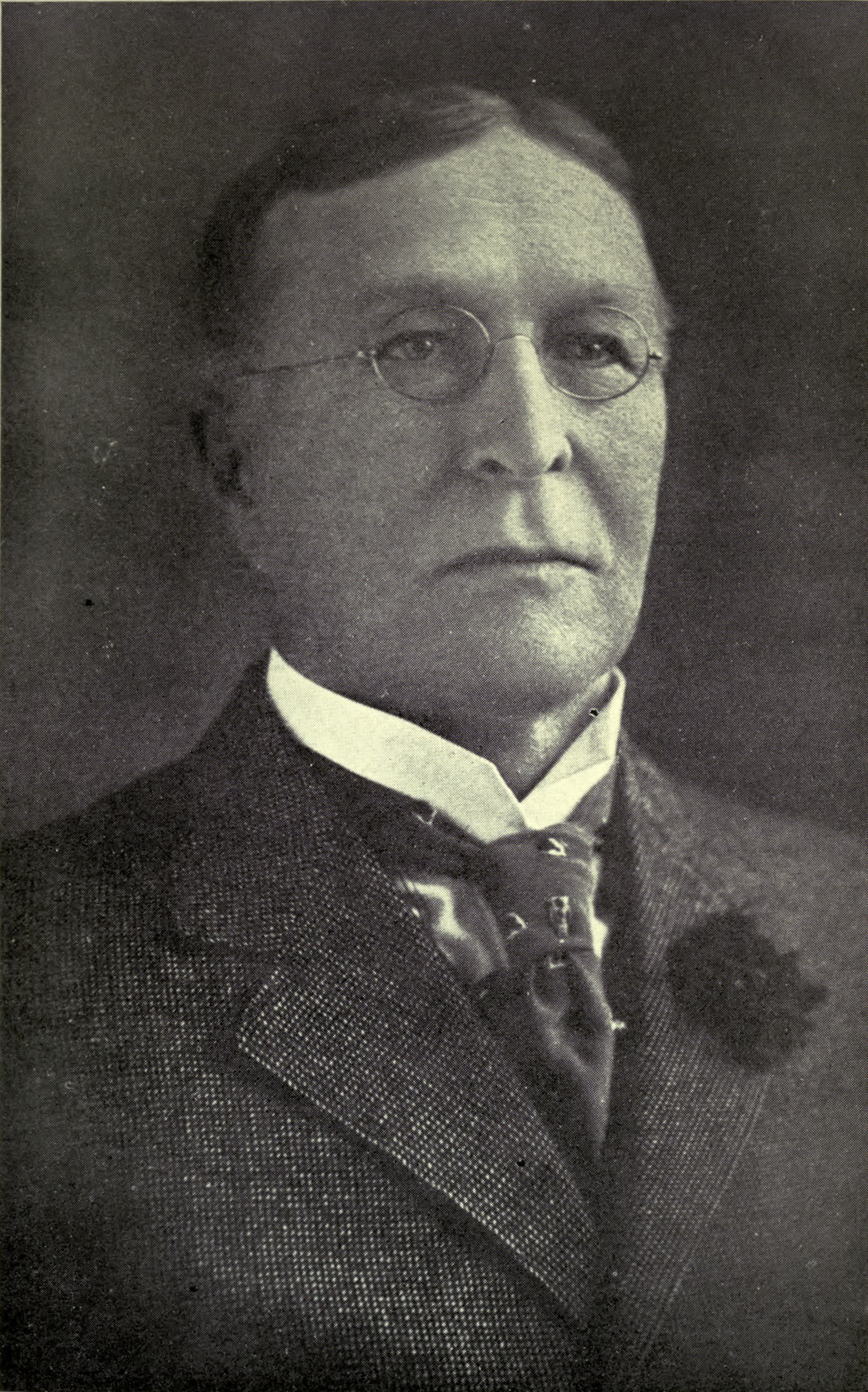
- Joseph Nathan Teal
- Born: 1858; Eugene, Oregon
- Died: 1929; Portland, Oregon
- Occupation: Attorney

Joseph Nathan Teal (1858–1929) was a prominent attorney and civic leader in Portland, Oregon in the early 20th century. He was known as an advocate of waterway development in the Pacific Northwest. He served as the chair of the Oregon Conservation Commission under governors Frank Benson and Oswald West. In 1909 he spoke at the first National Conservation Congress in Seattle. He served as the U.S. Shipping Commissioner in 1920–21.

Teal was promoted as a candidate for United States Secretary of the Interior in 1913. He commissioned the statue "The Pioneer" in Eugene. His only child (as of 1919) was Ruth Josephine Teal, who married Carleton Walter Betts of Buffalo in 1919.
