= On the War Trail =

Sculpture in Denver, Colorado, U.S.

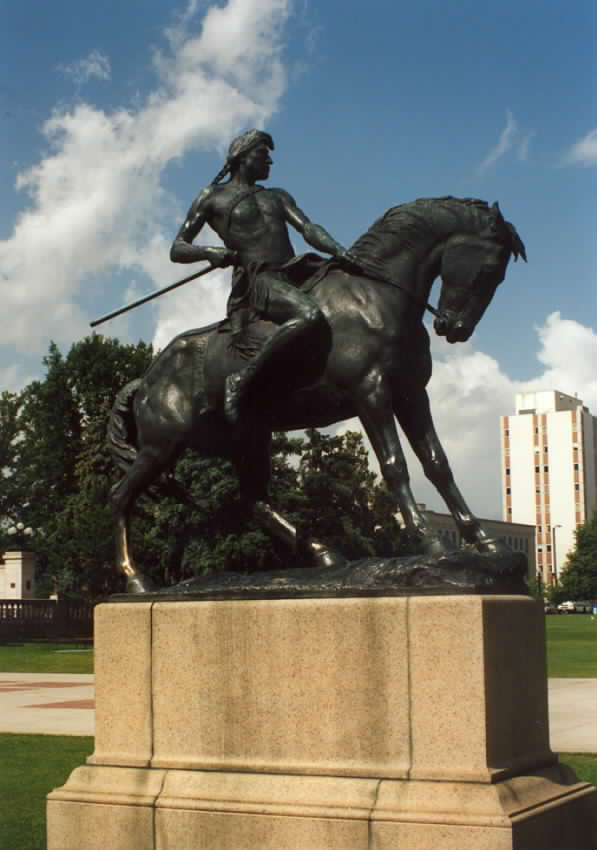
- The statue in 2005
- Artist: Alexander Phimister Proctor
- Year: 1922
- Medium: Bronze sculpture
- Location: Denver, Colorado, U.S.
- 39.738912°N 104.988647°W

On the War Trail is a 1922 statue by Alexander Phimister Proctor, installed outside the Colorado State Capitol in Civic Center Park, Denver, United States. The bronze sculpture depicts a Native American riding on a horse and carrying a spear.
