= The Seven Mustangs =

Sculpture in Austin, Texas, U.S.

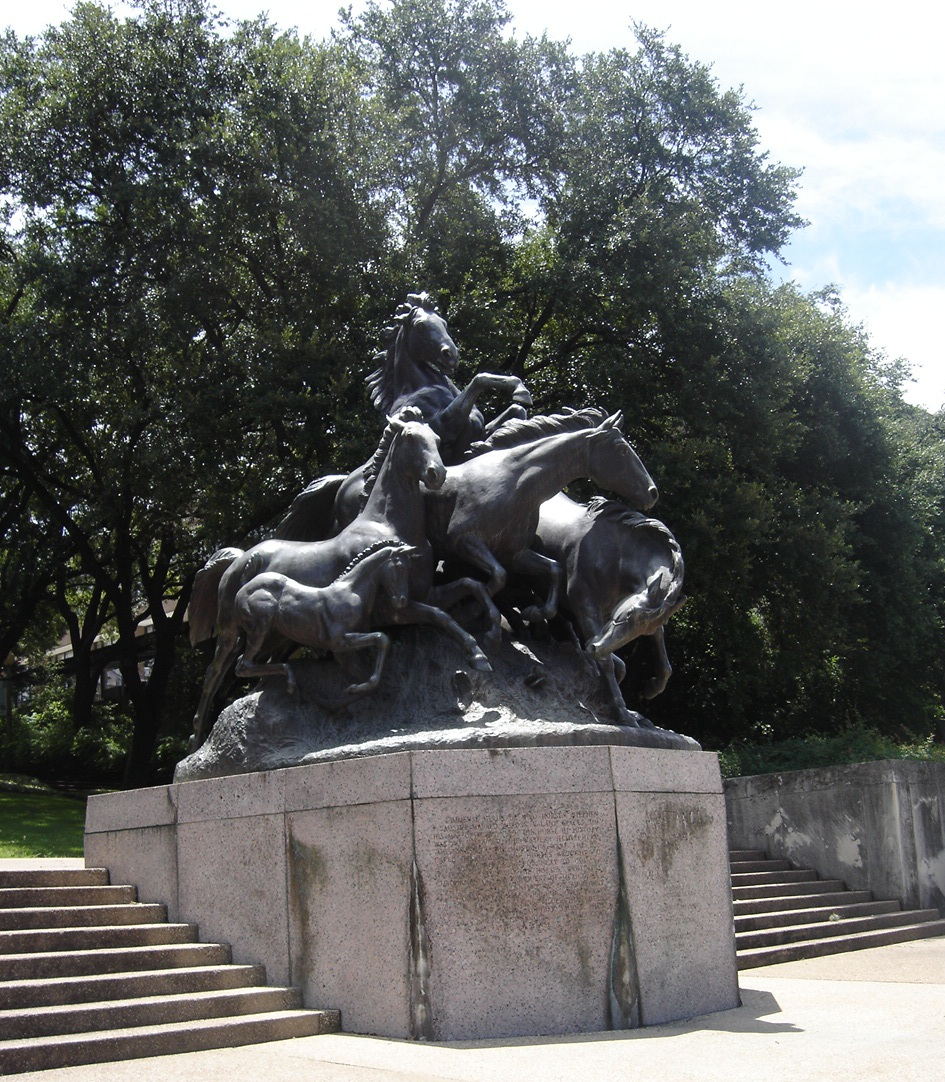
- The sculpture in 2007
- Artist: Alexander Phimister Proctor
- Year: 1948
- Type: Sculpture
- Medium: Bronze
- Subject: Mustangs
- Location: Austin, Texas, United States; 30°17′14″N 97°44′00″W

The Seven Mustangs, or simply Mustangs, is a bronze sculpture by Alexander Phimister Proctor located on the campus of the University of Texas at Austin. The sculpture was commissioned in 1937, modeled from 1939 to 1941, cast in 1947 and dedicated on May 31, 1948.

== See also ==
- 1948 in art
