= Statue of John McLoughlin =

Sculpture by Alexander Phimister Proctor

John McLoughlin
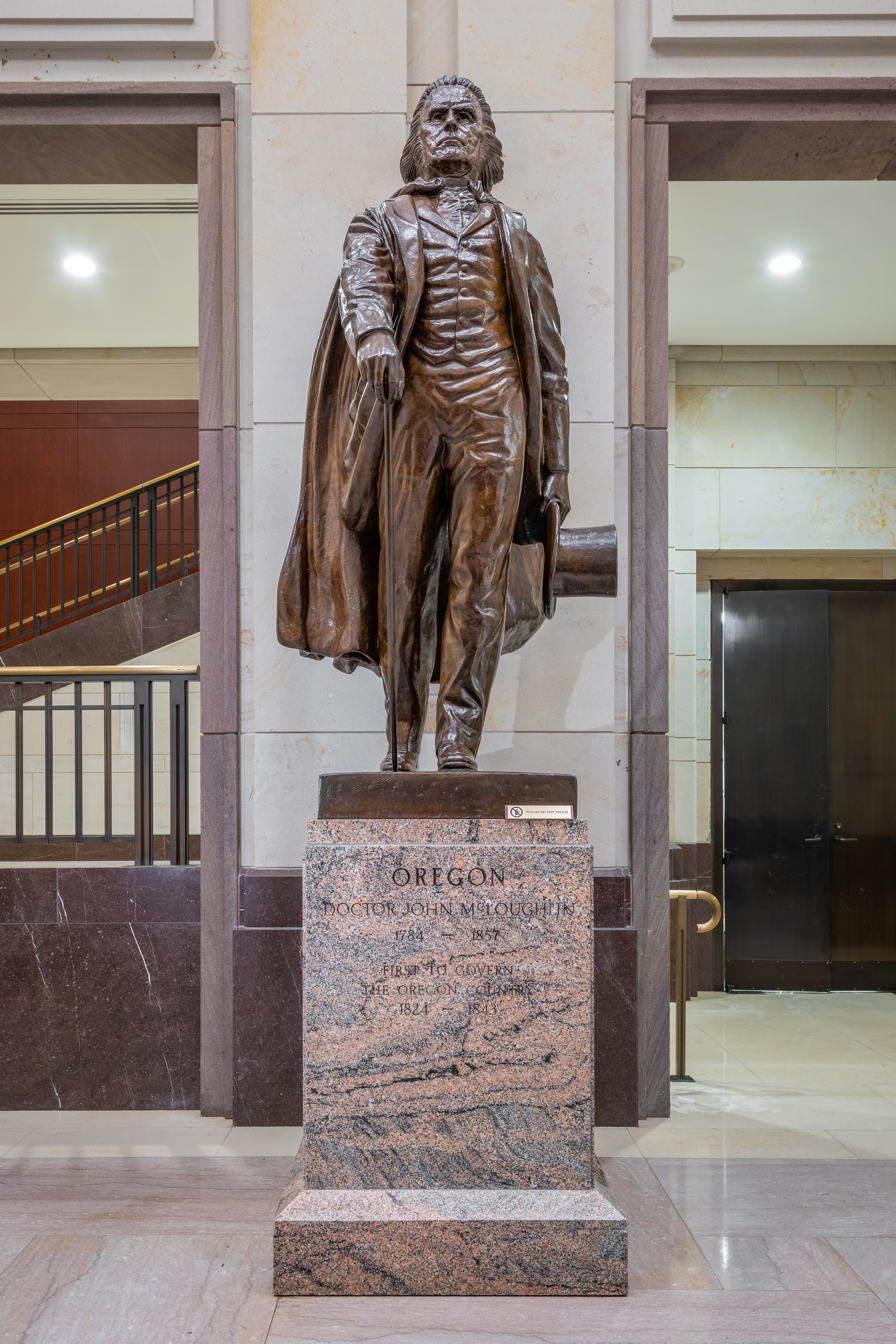
- The statue at the United States Capitol Visitor Center in 2023
- Artist: Alexander Phimister Proctor; Gifford MacGregor Proctor
- Year: 1953
- Type: Sculpture
- Medium: Bronze
- Subject: John McLoughlin
- Condition: "Treatment needed" (1993)
- Location: Salem, Oregon, United States; 44.93804°N 123.02927°W

John McLoughlin, also known as Dr. John McLoughlin, is a bronze sculpture of John McLoughlin by Alexander Phimister Proctor and completed by his son Gifford MacGregor Proctor. One statue is installed at the Oregon State Capitol grounds in Salem, Oregon; another is installed in Washington, D.C., as part of the National Statuary Hall Collection.

== Description and history ==
McLoughlin is shown wearing a suit and cape, with a top hat in his left hand. He has long hair and large sideburns. His left foot is in front of his right, and his right hand extends forward and is clenched in a fist. The statue in Oregon measures approximately 82 inches (2.1 m) x 42 inches (1.1 m) x 69 inches (1,800 mm) and rests on a concrete base that measures 61.5 inches (1.56 m) x 69 inches (1.8 m) x 81 inches (2.1 m). Its south side includes an inscription that reads: BEDI-RASSY ART FOUNDRY NY. A plaque on the front of the base displays the founder's mark and the text: DR. JOHN MCLOUGHLIN / 1784–1858 / FIRST TO GOVERN / THE OREGON COUNTRY / 1824–1843.

The Oregon bronze, installed on the grounds of the Oregon State Capitol in Salem, was created during 1950–1953 and dedicated in 1953. According to the Smithsonian Institution, it is a duplicate of another bronze unveiled in the United States Capitol in 1952, as part of the National Statuary Hall Collection. This sculpture was financed mainly by legislative appropriation, but also from contributions by Oregon school children. Its model was completed before Proctor's death in 1950. His son and associate Gifford MacGregor Proctor completed the sculpture. The statue was surveyed and considered "treatment needed" by the Smithsonian's "Save Outdoor Sculpture!" program in April 1993, and was administered by the Facility Services department of the State of Oregon at that time.

The statue is one of two that Proctor has had placed in the National Statuary Hall Collection.

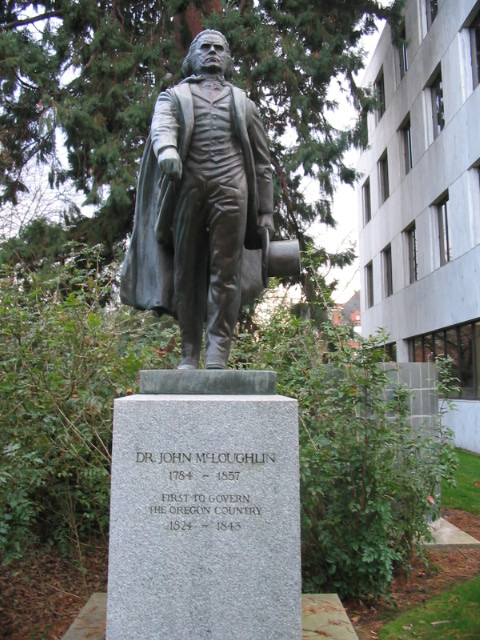
The statue in Salem, Oregon

== See also ==
- 1953 in art
- John McLoughlin Bridge
