= Buffalo (Proctor) =

Sculpture by Alexander Phimister Proctor

- One of four buffalo sculptures installed at the Dumbarton Bridge in Washington, D.C
- Artist: Alexander Phimister Proctor
- Location: 38.9108°N 77.0511°W

Buffalo, also known as Buffaloes, Dumbarton Bridge: Buffaloes, and Q Street Buffalo, is a series of monumental sculptures of buffalo by Alexander Phimister Proctor. Four of them are installed at the Dumbarton Bridge in Washington, D.C., in the United States.

== See also ==
- List of public art in Washington, D.C., Ward 2
