= The Circuit Rider =

Sculpture in Salem, Oregon, U.S.

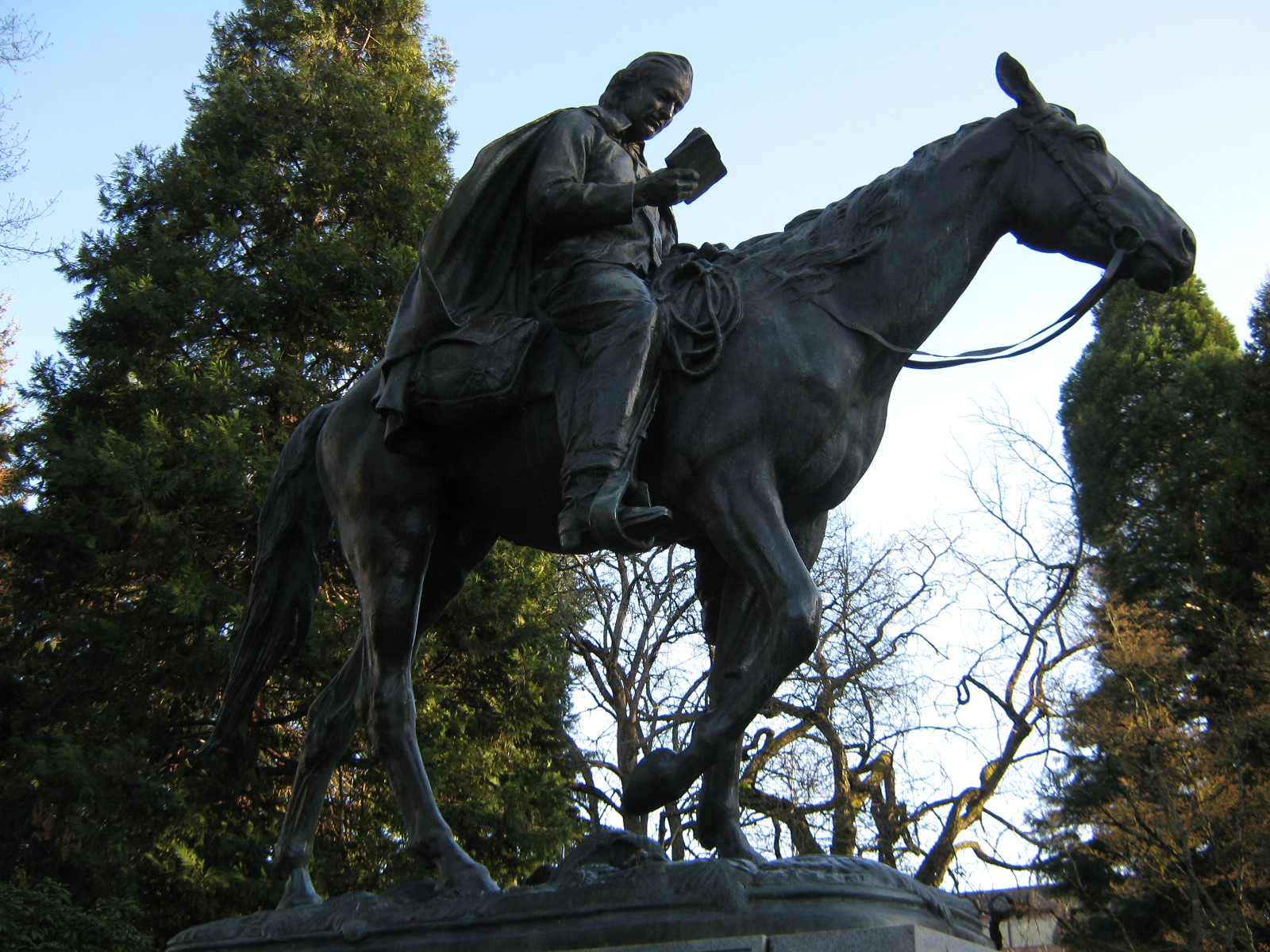
- The sculpture in 2014
- Artist: Alexander Phimister Proctor
- Year: 1924
- Type: Sculpture
- Medium: Bronze
- Location: Salem, Oregon; 44.938031°N 123.028684°W

The Circuit Rider is a bronze sculpture by Alexander Phimister Proctor, located in Capitol Park, east of the Oregon State Capitol in Salem, Oregon, in the United States.

== Description and history ==
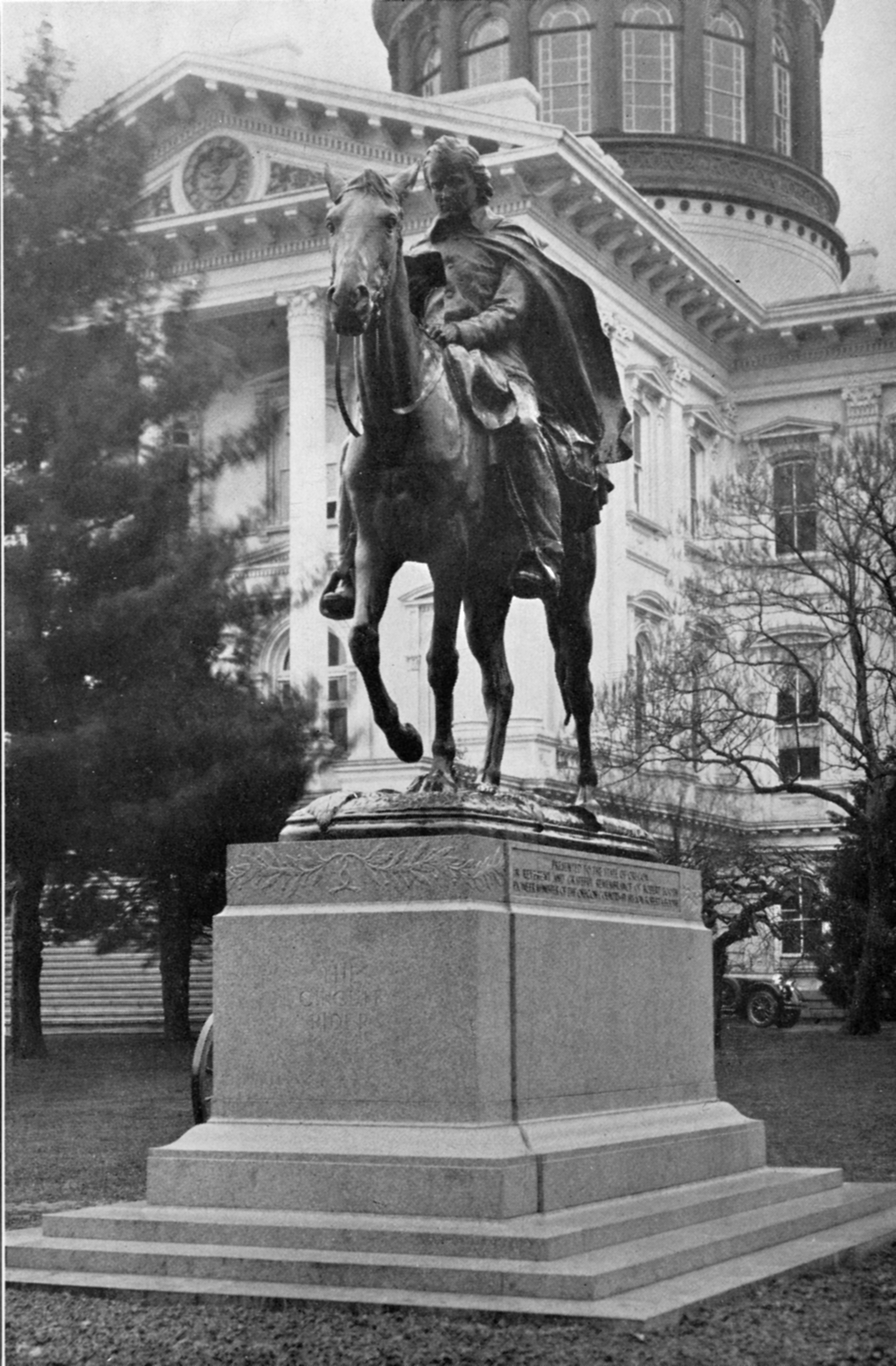
The statue in 1924.

According to the Springfield Museum, The Circuit Rider depicts "one of Oregon's pioneer circuit-riding Methodist ministers" and commemorates "the labors and achievements of the ministers of the Gospel, who as circuit riders became the friends, counselors and evangels to the pioneers on every American frontier." The Oregon Blue Book says the equestrian statue is "symbolic of the many missionaries who came to Oregon".

The 3.5-ton statue was cast by Roman Bronze Works in New York and was gifted to the State of Oregon in 1924. It was presented "in reverent and grateful remembrance of Robert Booth, pioneer minister of the Oregon Country" by his son, Robert Asbury Booth, who was a prominent Eugene businessman and Oregon State Highway Commissioner.

The sculpture was originally sited at the west front of the old Capitol building and was relocated during construction of the new Capitol building (c. 1936–1937). It was reoriented to face west, symbolizing the westward migration to Oregon, in January 1853. A tree fell on the statue during the Columbus Day Storm of 1962, knocking it off its pedestal. It remained on its side for several months, and was then sent to the studio of James Lee Hansen of Vancouver, Washington for repairs. The statue was returned to its pedestal in August 1963. In 1993, the statue was surveyed by the Smithsonian Institution's Save Outdoor Sculpture! program, which concluded that "treatment [was] needed".

== See also ==
- List of equestrian statues in the United States
