= The Pioneer (Eugene, Oregon) =

Sculpture in Eugene, Oregon, U.S.

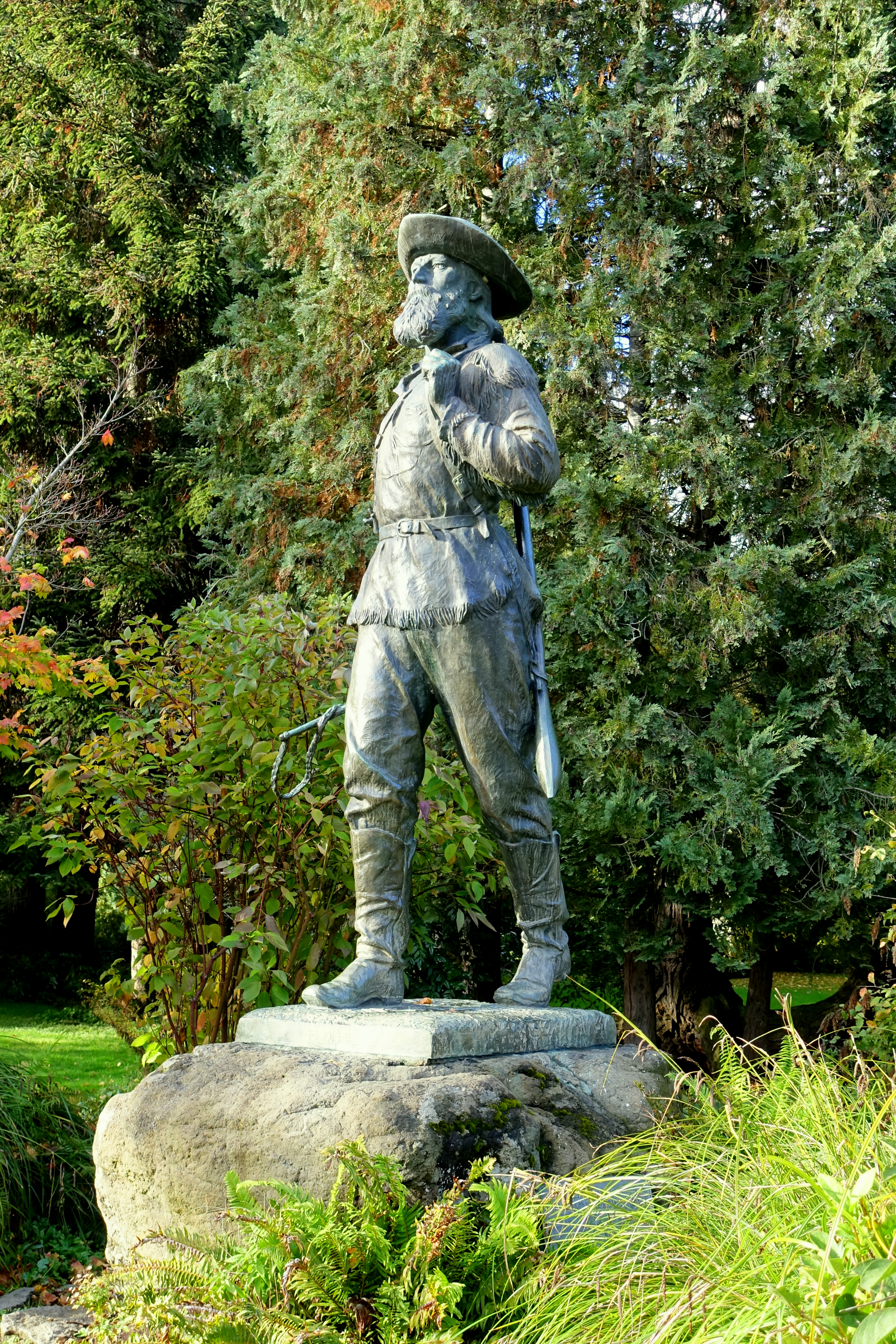
- The statue in 2017
- Artist: Alexander Phimister Proctor
- Year: 1919
- Type: Sculpture
- Medium: Bronze
- Subject: An Oregonian pioneer
- Dimensions: 4.0 m (13 ft)
- Location: Eugene, Oregon, United States; 44°02′45″N 123°04′33″W

The Pioneer is a thirteen-foot-tall bronze sculpture formerly located on the University of Oregon campus in Eugene, Oregon, United States. It was the artistic work of Alexander Phimister Proctor, commissioned by Joseph Nathan Teal, a Portland attorney. A ceremony celebrated its unveiling on May 22, 1919. It included attendance from persons all across the state, the majority of enrolled students, and a special section of the crowd was reserved for the remaining settlers. T. G. Hendricks and his granddaughter removed the canvas cover, unveiling the statue. As of June 13, 2020, the statue is no longer standing on the University of Oregon campus.

== Creation and design ==
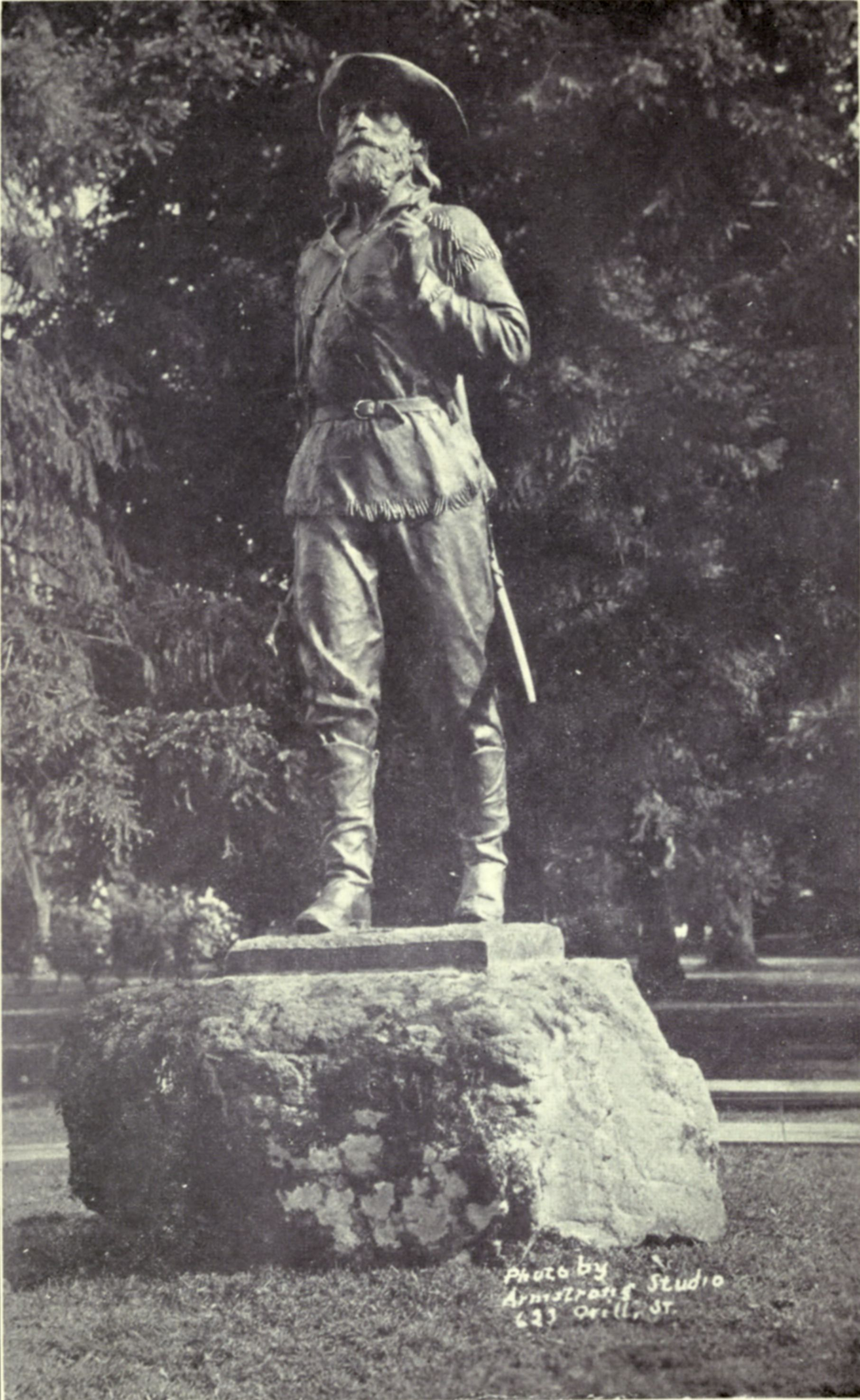
The Pioneer at its dedication in 1919

The Pioneer was a long time in the making. Proctor had completed sculptures of settler groups, but he searched for a model that would "typify the real spirit of the West." After a ten-year search, he found the image in J. C. Cravens, an "old trapper bewhiskered without a haircut heavy boots thick plants a buckskin coat carrying his rifle and leading a nag." Once he had this model, Proctor took the idea to Portland lawyer and businessman Joseph Teal, who commissioned the sculpture. It was the first statue placed on the University of Oregon campus.

The Pioneer is about ruggedness and movement. In form, the sculpture follows attributes of the model, with him being portrayed in similar garb, with a full beard and a rifle slung over his shoulder. His body language is proud, as seen in the set of his shoulders and the level of his chin. Further, his open stance implies movement, with his eyes gazing forward and his weight seeming to be in the process of shifting from one foot to the next. The natural, hard organic sentiment flows all the way to his rock pedestal. The basalt was "one that had weathered many storms and had been tossed about by the river currents yet enduring ... [Proctor] thought it was in keeping with the ideals of the Pioneer who had weathered similar storms."

== Location ==
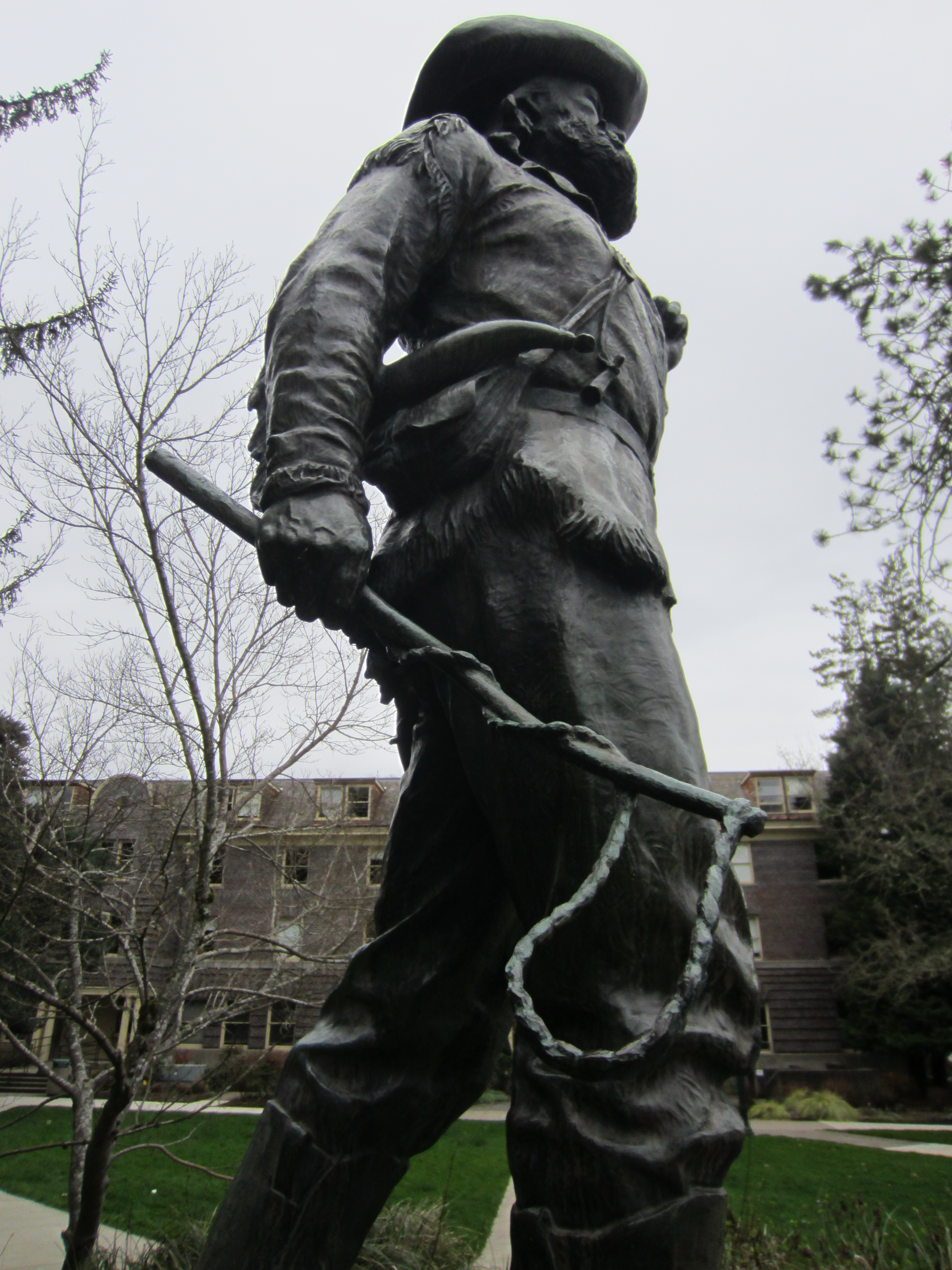
The statue in 2014

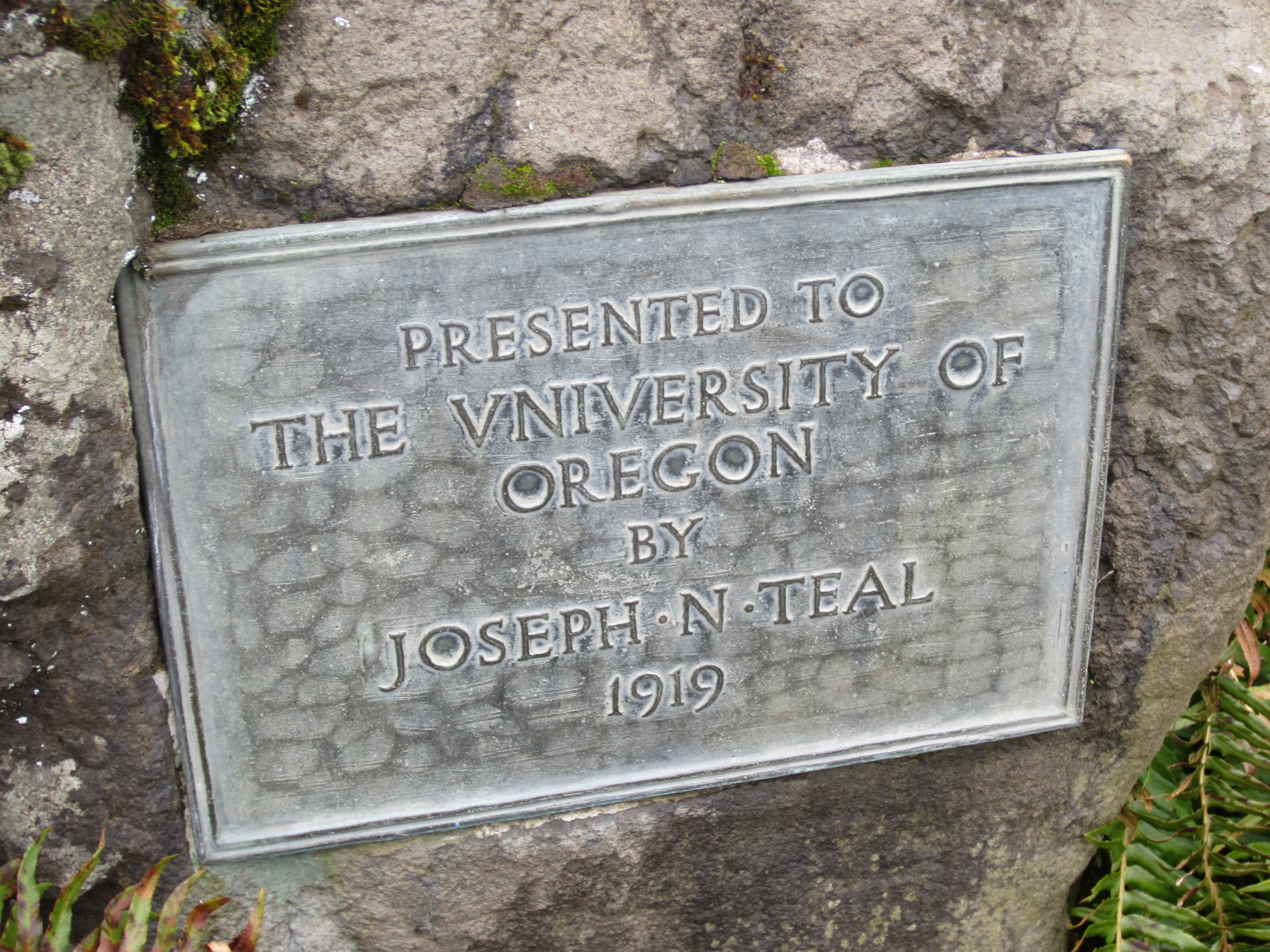
Plaque in 2014

The statue's location was chosen deliberately--both in its general location and in its specific position. The bronze was cast from a plaster form in Rhode Island and its trip to Oregon took over a month by train. When Proctor gave his presentation address of the sculpture he said:

"It is sufficient to say that here the Willamette and McKenzie rivers join their waters into one grand channel and create this beautiful valley, the paradise to which the pioneer struggled over great mountains and across desert plains to which he first came in numbers, and in which he made home. No more fitting place than the campus of University of Oregon could be found for the memorial."

A committee including Mr. and Mrs. Teal, Dean Ellis F. Lawrence, and Irene Hazard Gerlinger chose the statue's exact physical location. It was placed within the Oregon fir trees facing the Administrative Building between the library (Fenton Hall) and Friendly Hall on the University of Oregon campus. The statue was situated facing southward, as requested by the artist, to ensure that the figure's front received as much natural light exposure as possible.

== Naming ==
When this sculpture was created and placed its official name was The Pioneer, not The Pioneer Father. The name "Pioneer Father" only came about after the intentions of the creation of the Pioneer Mother was made public in the late 1920s; it was an edit that provided a means to distinguish between the two sculptures. However, with this change, the original intent was misconstrued or lost altogether. When The Pioneer was unveiled, Joseph Teal said:

"This statue is erected and dedicated to the memory of all Oregon pioneers. It is in no sense personal or individual and it is my earnest wish and hope that this fact may ever be kept in mind." "The pioneer represents all that noblest and best in our history. The men and women who saved the west for this country were animated by the highest motives. They made untold sacrifices and endured hardships of every kind in order that their children might enjoy the fruits of their labor."

At the 1919 dedication, the President of the Oregon Historical Society extolled the virtues of the Anglo-Saxon race, stating,

"the Anglo-Saxon race is a branch of the Teutonic race. It was and is a liberty-loving race. It believes in the protection of life and of liberty an in the rights of property and the pursuit of happiness. This race has large powers of assimilation, and its great ideas of liberty and of the rights of mankind caused other races to become a part of it, so it became a people as well as a race."

It was designed to be a memorial for all Oregon settlers, men and women alike. Marc Carpenter, who researched the history of the statue in 2018, stated, "A monument is a celebration. Monuments innately celebrate that which they depict. So, to me, it feels very similar to the confederate monuments that speckled a large part of the rest of the country. It’s a monument to violence and white supremacy."

== History ==
In a 1928 newspaper article, the statue was described as standing "in the center of the campus", and depicting "the pioneer spirit of the West". In 1929, the statue was guarded against vandalism, along with other Eugene landmarks, prior to the homecoming football game rivalry with Oregon State University. An editorial in the Eugene Guard in 1931 mentioned, in the context of the in-state rivalry: "Orange paint of the hue so popular in the vicinity of Corvallis daubs the pavements at the University, the big 'O' on Skinner's Butte, even the famous Pioneer statue."

In 1963, describing "Goblin antics", the Eugene Guard reported, "Someone took the Halloween occasion Thursday night to decorate the Pioneer Father statue on the University of Oregon campus. Arrows 'protruded' from his body and a tomahawk was 'imbedded' in his head."

== Removal ==
The statue was vandalized in April 2019; it was painted red both in the groin area and on the whip. Then on May 20, 2019—the hundredth anniversary of the statue's installation—students from the Native American Students Union held a protest, calling for the Pioneer to be removed due to the experience of Native American peoples of Oregon. Michael Schill, who was President of UO at the time, created a committee with the charge "to make recommendations to balance the representation of history on campus to include people of diverse backgrounds".

On June 13, 2020, following a rally at Deady Hall (renamed University Hall on June 24), a group of unknown individuals pulled down and vandalized the statue and moved it to the front steps of Johnson Hall, also toppling and defacing The Pioneer Mother. On June 14, the university put both statues into storage.

== See also ==
- 1919 in art
- List of monuments and memorials removed during the George Floyd protests
