= Anita Snellman =

Finnish painter (1924–2006)

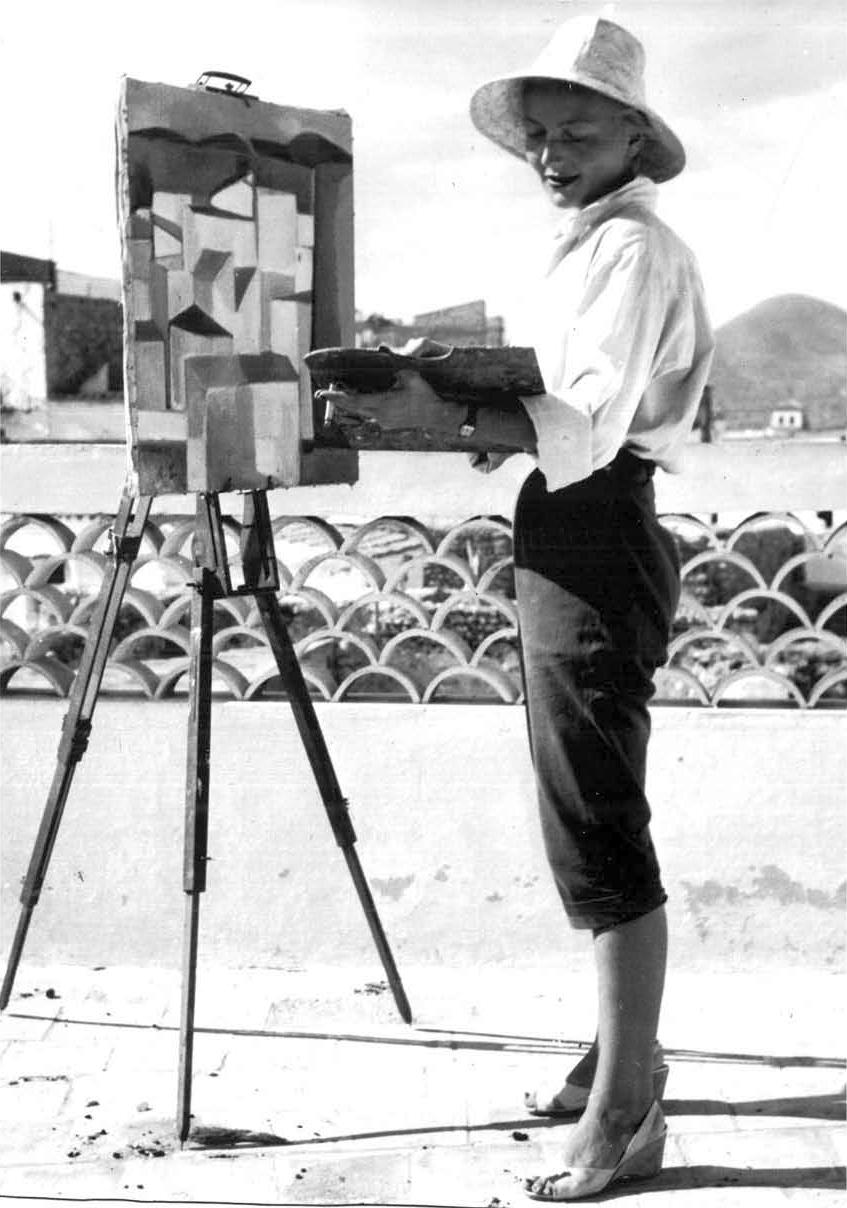
- Anita Snellman at work in 1957.
- Born: Sini Anita Kyllikki Snellman; 4 September 1924; Helsinki, Finland
- Died: 24 February 2006 (aged 81); Helsinki, Finland
- Known for: Painting
- Spouse: George Gonneau (m. 1951–1958)
- Awards: Pro Finlandia medal (1976)

Sini Anita Kyllikki Snellman (4 September 1924 – 24 February 2006) was a Finnish painter.

== Biography ==
Snellman was born in Helsinki on 4 September 1924. She studied at the Royal Academy of Arts in Helsinki, the Royal Swedish Academy of Fine Arts in Stockholm and at Académie Julian in Paris.

After spending time in Paris, she moved to Ibiza, where she bought an apartment in the late 1960s.

Snellman taught at the Academy of Fine Arts, Helsinki from 1971 to 1979.

She received the Pro Finlandia in 1976. In 1979 she established the Anita Snellman Foundation.

Snellman died on 24 February 2006 in Helsinki. She is buried in the Hietaniemi Cemetery in Helsinki.

== Collections ==
Snellman's work is held in the following public collections in Finland:

- Ateneum Art Museum
- Amos Anderson Art Museum
- Lahti Museum
- Tampere Museum for Contemporary Art
- Oulu Museum of Art
- Joensuu Art Museum
- Imatra Art Museum
- Helsinki Art Museum
- Kuopio Art Museum
- Wihuri Foundation collection
