= Head of a Catalan Peasant =

Series of paintings by Joan Miró

- Artist: Joan Miró
- Year: 1924-1925
- Collection: National Gallery of Art

Head of a Catalan Peasant is an emblematic sequence of oil paintings and pencil made by Joan Miró between 1924 and 1925. Miró began this series the same year that André Breton published his Manifesto of Surrealism. The series was made partly in Paris. For Joan Miró "a peasant" symbolized rural knowledge, and also reflected his Catalan identity.

The Fundació Joan Miró of Barcelona keeps several preparatory drawings for this series.

The work demonstrates that Miró had ties with his homeland throughout his career. Joan Miró created this series in response to the prohibition of the Catalan language by Miguel Primo de Rivera. He was also influenced by the rural environment of Baix Camp. In this series he further develops the language started in works such as Catalan Landscape (The Hunter). The sequence followed by Miró has been interpreted several times as a progressive simplification of the same scene. Christopher Green, in turn, says that this is not exactly a linear trend toward simplification, but rather a dilemma, an internal discussion between the artist which creates the filled pictorial space.

== Description ==
The series shares the synthetic representation of the figure of a Catalan peasant, by a repetition of symbols such as the triangular head, the beard and red hat (called Barretina), all combined in one pole figure. In this group of oil paintings, Miró outlines the figure of a farmer several times, working with neutral background blue or yellow. As said Margit Rowell, Joan Miró explained his intentions with this work:

I escaped into the absolute. I wanted my spots to seem open to the magnetic appeal of the void. I was very interested in the void, in perfect emptiness. I put it into my pale and scumbled grounds, and my linear gestures on top were the signs of my dream progression.

— Joan Miró

== Series ==
=== Head of a Catalan Peasant (1924) ===
Head of a Catalan Peasant
- Cap de pagès Català (Catalan)
- Artist: Joan Miró
- Year: 1924
- Type: Oil painting technique and color pencils
- Dimensions: 146 cm × 114.2 cm (57 in × 45.0 in)
- Location: National Gallery of Art; Washington, D.C.

This first version of the Catalan Peasant was painted in 1924 and is now part of the permanent collection of the National Gallery of Art in Washington, D.C. It became part of the collection as a gift of the Collectors Committee of the institution. The work is signed at lower right: Miró / 1924. The back of the work is signed Joan Miró, Tête de Paysan Catalan, 1924.

==== Exhibitions ====
Year	Exhibition	Place	City	Ref
1934	Ausstellung	Kunsthaus Zürich	Zurich	
1936	International Surrealist Exhibition	New Burlington Galleries	London	
1980	XIX & XX Century Master Paintings	Acquavella Galleries, Inc.	New-York	
1982	Miró in America	Museum of Fine Arts	Houston	
1993	Joan Miró: 1893-1993	Fundació Joan Miró	Barcelona	
1993	Joan Miró: Campo de Estrellas	Museo Nacional Centro de Arte Reina Sofía	Madrid	
1993	Joan Miró	Museum of Modern Art	New York	
1997	Joan Miró: Campesino catalán con guitarra	Fundación Colección Thyssen-Bornemisza	Madrid	
1998–1999	Joan Miró	Moderna Museet & Louisiana Museum of Modern Art	Stockholm & Humlebaek	
2004	Joan Miró 1917-1934: La Naissance du Monde	Centre Georges Pompidou	Paris	
2008	La invención del siglo XX. Carl Einstein y las vanguardias	Museo Nacional Centro de Arte Reina Sofía	Madrid	
2008	Miró: la tierra	Palazzo dei Diamanti i Museu Thyssen-Bornemisza	Ferrara i Madrid	
2011	Miró: The ladder of escape	Tate Modern	London	
2011	Miró: L'escala de l'evasió	Fundació Joan Miró	Barcelona	

=== Head of a Catalan Peasant ===
Head of a Catalan Peasant
- Cap de pagès Català (Catalan)
- Artist: Joan Miró
- Year: 1924-1925
- Medium: Oil on canvas
- Dimensions: 47 cm × 45 cm (19 in × 18 in)
- Location: private collection; N.D.

Is the most unknown of the series, which belongs to a private collector, but has been seen in several exhibitions:

==== Exhibitions ====
Year	Exhibition	Place	City	Ref
1959		MoMA and Los Angeles County Museum	New York and Los Angeles	
1964		Tate and Kunsthaus Zürich	London and Zurich	
1968		Antic Hospital de la Santa Creu	Barcelona	

=== Catalan peasant with guitar ===
Catalan peasant with guitar
- Cap de pagès Català amb guitarra (Catalan)
- Artist: Joan Miró
- Year: 1924
- Type: Oil painting technique and color pencils
- Dimensions: 147 cm × 114 cm (58 in × 45 in)
- Location: Museo Thyssen-Bornemisza; Madrid

This work demonstrates the process of synthesis that Miró began using in his compositions later in his trip to France in the early 20s, after coming into contact with the Surrealists and Dadaists. Miró began to create his own sign language. In this version of the series, you can see the farmer's body with a hat on an intense blue background.

=== Head of a Catalan Peasant (10 March 1925) ===
Head of a Catalan Peasant
- Cap de pagès Català (Catalan)
- Artist: Joan Miró
- Year: 10 March 1925
- Type: Oil painting technique and color pencils
- Dimensions: 92.4 cm × 73 cm (36.4 in × 29 in)
- Location: National Gallery of Scotland; Edinburgh

The version preserved in Edinburgh is the third of four Catalan Peasants that Miró made. You can understand this painting as a self-portrait of Miró, which affirms his Catalan identity. The work, conducted in 1925, was made at a time when Miró was gradually moving away from Cubism. Previously the work had been part of private collection of Roland Penrose. Currently the work is preserved in the Scottish National Gallery of Modern Art. It was acquired along with the help of the Art Fund, the Friends of the Tate Gallery and the Knapping Fund 1999.

=== Head of a Catalan Peasant 1925 ===
Head of a Catalan Peasant
- Cap de pagès Català (Catalan)
- Artist: Joan Miró
- Year: 1925
- Type: Oil painting technique and color pencils
- Dimensions: 147 cm × 115 cm (58 in × 45 in)
- Location: Moderna Museet; Stockholm

This version is kept in Moderna Museet, Stockholm. It joined the museum with the registration number MOM 445, in the legacy of Gerard Bonnier in 1989. He had previously been owned by Jacques Viot, Galerie Pierre (Loeb), Private Samling, Marcel Mabille and Svensk-Fransk Konstgalleriet. This version is one of the synthetic series, dominated by a blue a bit more intense than in the rest of the works. You can also see a black cross, surmounted by a small hat. The space is decorated with a pair of stars, one white and one black.
