= The Pioneer Mother (Eugene, Oregon) =

Sculpture in Eugene, Oregon, U.S.

Pioneer Mother
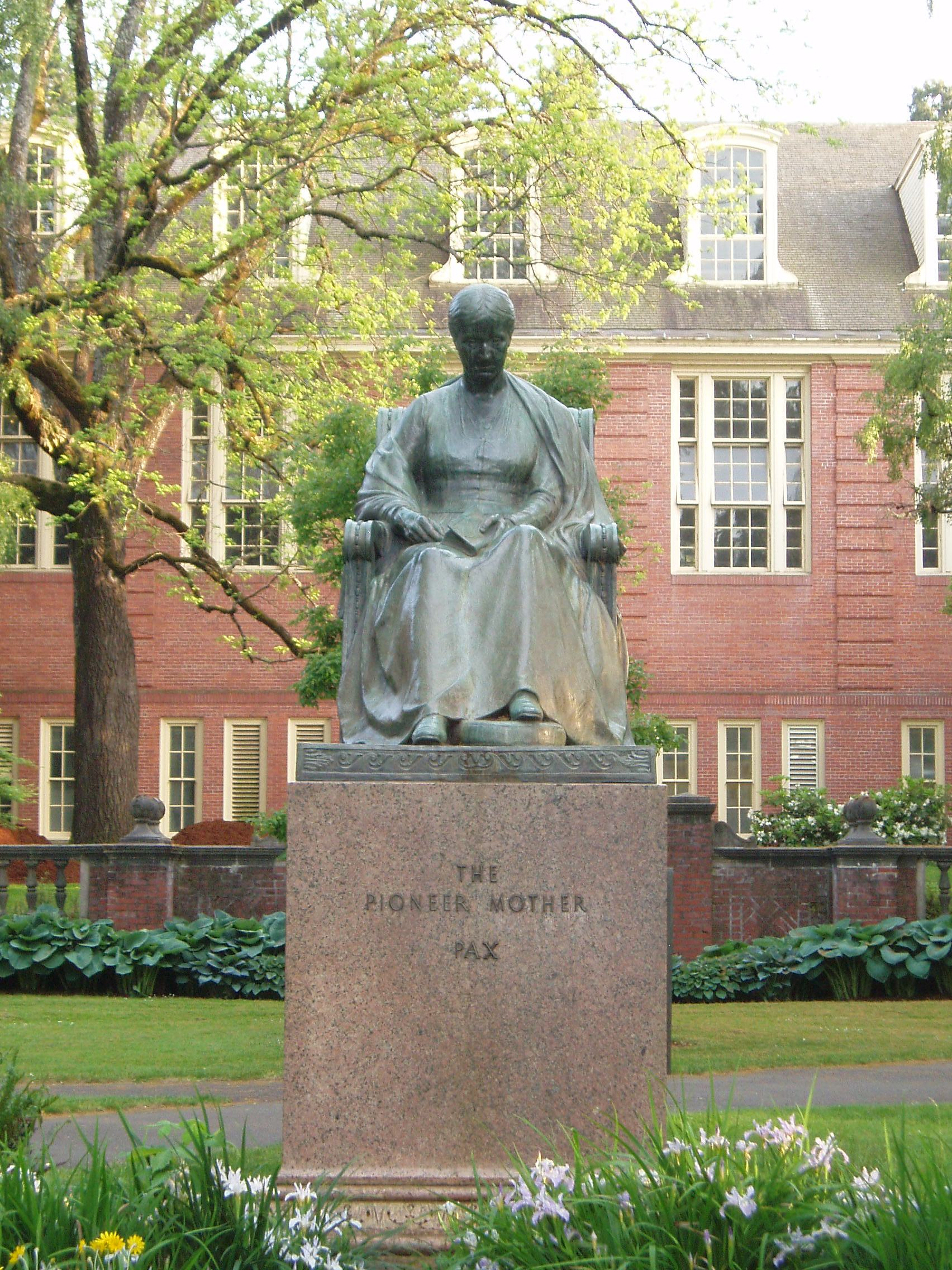
- The sculpture in 2007
- Artist: Alexander Phimister Proctor
- Year: 1932
- Type: Sculpture
- Medium: Bronze
- Subject: An Oregon pioneer mother
- Location: Eugene, Oregon, United States; 44°02′39″N 123°04′33″W

The Pioneer Mother is a sculpture formerly located on the University of Oregon campus in Eugene, Oregon. Burt Barker donated the six-foot-tall bronze sculpture, created by artist Alexander Phimister Proctor, to the university. Barker's daughter, Barbara Barker, introduced the sculpture to a public gathering of hundreds on May 7, 1932, during Junior Week and Mother's Day festivities.

== Creation and design ==
Pioneer Mother began with Barker, then a vice-president of the University of Oregon, who had the initial idea to represent the pioneer mothers on campus and financial resources to present this work as a gift to the state board of education. He commissioned Proctor to do the work in 1927, since Proctor had already created The Pioneer. For this sculpture, the model was Barker's own mother, Elvira Brown Barker, who migrated to Oregon across the Great Plains in 1847.

In design, The Pioneer Mother conveys the subject in later life, after the trials of the journey westward had long been completed. When Barker made the news of his gift public, he described what set this sculpture apart: "[o]thers have perpetuated the struggles of the pioneer mother; I want to perpetuate the peace which followed her struggles." The sculpture, placed atop a six-foot-tall base of pink granite, portrays a woman sitting at rest on a straight-backed chair, with a Bible upon her lap. The clear lines and massing of the base further enhance the suggestion of repose. Her journey, as represented in the bronze bas-relief panels on the west and east sides of the base, is over, and she is firmly rooted in her new home. Her style, as seen in her hair arrangement and cut of her dress, is simple, she is a depiction of all pioneer mothers in the twilight of their years.

== Location ==
The sculpture was intentionally placed in a busy location on the University of Oregon campus. Barker stated in his address at her unveiling that "[i]t has been placed on the campus of the University of Oregon ... with the hope that so placed in the midst of the students and their activities, it may tell its story as a work of art and become a strong factor in implanting the love of the beautiful in the lives of the students as they go in and out before it."

As to her exact location, an Old Oregon article describes her placement thus:

"[h]er site was not chosen until a cardboard facsimile of the statue was placed at various positions on the campus. After the entire women's quadrangle was changed, the Mother was placed in the center, close enough to several paths so she can catch bits of University chatter."

She faces north, toward The Pioneer, a sculpture of a male pioneer, with Johnson Hall, the university's main administration building, between them. The sculptures are about one hundred yards apart. The primary sources consulted, however, give no indication that this was done with the intention they face each other as the popular notion today insists.

== History ==
The statue was toppled by activists in June 2020, along with The Pioneer. The president of the university condemned the actions as vandalism.

== See also ==
- 1932 in art
- Oregon Trail
- List of monuments and memorials removed during the George Floyd protests
