= Alexander Phimister Proctor =

American sculptor (1860–1950)

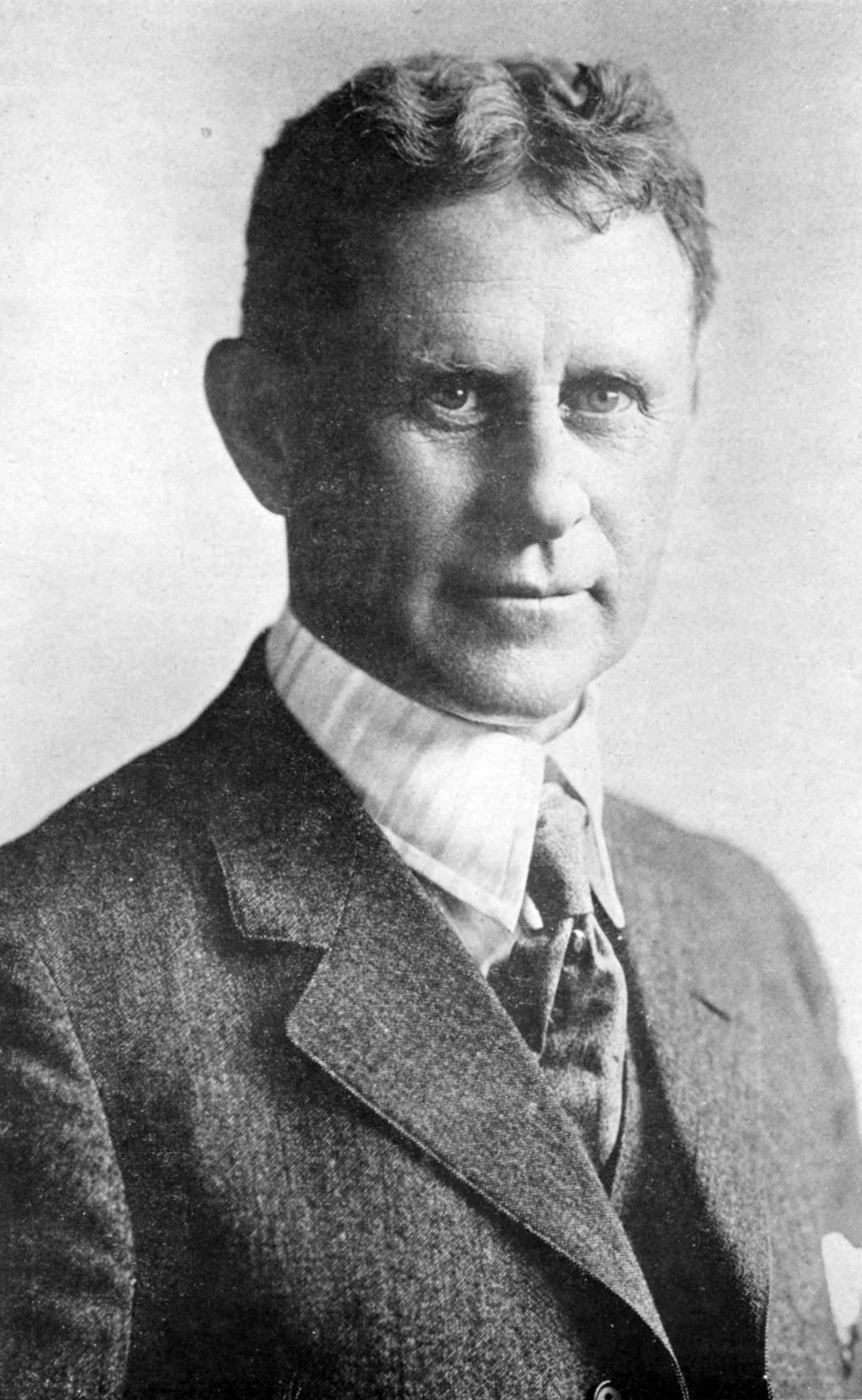
- Proctor as depicted in the Oregon Historical Quarterly, 1919
- Born: September 27, 1860; Bosanquet Township, Ontario, Canada (then in the Province of Canada)
- Died: September 5, 1950 (aged 89); Palo Alto, California, U.S.
- Known for: Sculpture and painter
- Notable work: Bucking Bronco, Denver, Colorado (1920); Theodore Roosevelt, Rough Rider, Portland, Oregon (1922); On the War Trail, Denver, Colorado (1923)
- Awards: Columbian Exposition, Designer Medal (1893); Académie Julian, Medal and Prize (1894); Paris Exposition, Gold Medal (1900); Louisiana Purchase Exposition, Gold Medal (1904); Architectural League of New York, Gold Medal of Honor (1911); Panama–Pacific International Exposition, Gold Medal (1915)

Alexander Phimister Proctor (September 27, 1860 – September 5, 1950) was an American sculptor with the contemporary reputation as one of the nation's foremost animaliers.

== Birth and early years ==
Proctor was born on September 27, 1860 in Bosanquet, Ontario, near the village of Arkona, Ontario, the son of Thirzah Smith (born 1832), herself daughter of a contractor on the Erie and Welland Canals, and Alexander Proctor (1822–alive 1904). The family emigrated to the United States in 1866 and moved to Iowa and then to Denver, Colorado, when Alexander was eleven. Growing up on the frontier, Proctor early developed into a skilled woodsman and hunter—interests that remained with him for the rest of his life. In his autobiography, Sculptor in Buckskin, he spends as much ink, and seems to be as excited about killing his first bear and elk as he is about obtaining his first major commission.

Along with his gun, Proctor took pencils and a sketching pad with him on his trips through the Rocky Mountains. As a hunter he always was careful to measure, draw, and sometimes dissect the animals that had crossed his gun sights. These early studies helped propel him to the position of one of the most sought after and respected animaliers of his day. He was fortunate to find an art instructor in the still rough and tumble Colorado, where his early drawings included big horn sheep, elk, bears, and the lynching of outlaw L. H. Musgrove, which occurred in Denver in November 1868.

== Studies in New York and Paris ==
Self-portrait, 1882

In 1885 Proctor sold a homestead that he had acquired near Grand Lake, Colorado, and used the proceeds to move to New York City with the intention of studying art. He enrolled first in the National Academy of Design where he studied drawing and painting, and later, at the Art Students League of New York, where his interest in sculpture came to the fore. His ability to capture animals in action, garnered in part from his days tracking them, coupled with his interest in all things Native American, opened a niche for Proctor, one that he parlayed into a long, successful career.

As with many of his contemporaries, Proctor's opportunity to work with some of the greatest sculptors of his day, coupled with the opportunity to create his own large, albeit temporary, pieces presented itself in the guise of the World Columbian Exposition of 1893 in Chicago. Proctor later was called upon to produce works of various Western themes, mostly figures of native animals, but also a cowboy and Indian that were to form the genesis of his later works, The Bucking Bronco and On the War Trail, both found in Denver.

Proctor moved to Paris to continue his studies. During this period he assisted Augustus Saint Gaudens in the creating of the General John Logan Memorial, now in Chicago. In 1896 he won the Rinehart Scholarship which allowed him to work and study in Paris for four years under Jean Antoine Injalbert and others. By the time he returned to America in 1899 Proctor was well versed in the Beaux-Arts tradition.

== Settling in New York City ==
Proctor's output after he moved to New York City was prolific; among his creations in this period was the sculpture of the horse underneath William Tecumseh Sherman in Grand Army Plaza, bordering Central Park. (Most of the 1903 equestrian statue was by Augustus Saint-Gaudens; the architect of the installation was Charles Follen McKim.) In September 1909, Proctor was commissioned to design four large bronze tigers for the 16th Street Bridge in Washington, D.C. He made minor adjustments in the models, and then cast two more tigers to flank the steps of Nassau Hall at Princeton University. He also designed and cast some animal heads for the Bronx Zoo.

Proctor and Alden Sampson had McKim, Mead & White design a three-story double-studio for them on East 51st Street, off Third Avenue, in 1911. The building had a romantic brick facade with double-height rooms on the second and third floors, step-out balconies, and a projecting pent-eave roof. While the building no longer exists, it did represent an intriguing collaboration between the preeminent architecture firm and one of the leading sculptors of wildlife of the day.

From this studio in 1922 Proctor completed a model of an equestrian statue of Theodore Roosevelt. The sculpture was commissioned by Henry Waldo Coe, a long-time friend of both Roosevelt and Proctor. Coe donated Proctor's sculpture, Theodore Roosevelt, Rough Rider, to the city of Portland, Oregon. Two other versions of this sculpture were created for the cities of Mandan and Minot, North Dakota, and yet another sculpture cast from the same mold many years after Proctor's death was dedicated in Oyster Bay, New York, on October 29, 2005. His work was also part of the sculpture event in the art competition at the 1928 Summer Olympics.

== Later years ==
In between commissions Proctor frequently returned to the West for rejuvenation and inspiration, seeking out members of various Native American tribes to pose for his works.

On a hunting trip to Alaska in 1947 Proctor shot a bear, seventy years to the day after which he had bagged his first one.

Proctor died in Palo Alto, California on September 5, 1950, where he was living with his daughter, just a few days before his ninetieth birthday.

A sculptor of the "old school," Proctor resisted even the vestiges of modernism that many of his contemporaries adopted. Examples of his legacy are scattered from coast to coast throughout America. As one of the witnesses of the death of the old America (many other artists saw only the birth of the new one) Proctor's works showing the animals and peoples of frontier America remain popular and as vital today as when he produced them.

== Selected works ==
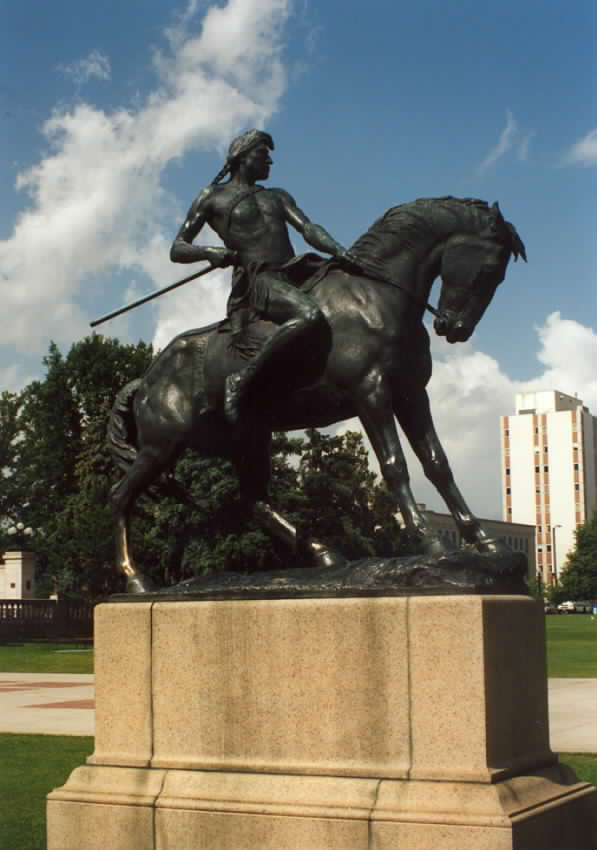
On the War Trail, 1922, Denver, Colorado

- Moose, Polar Bears, Jaguars, Elk, Cowboy on Horse and Indian on Horse (along Grand Basin and Lagoon); Lions (in front of Palace of Fine Arts) at the World's Columbian Exposition, 1893.
- General John Logan Memorial (horse only), Grant Park, Chicago, Illinois, 1894–1897
- William T. Sherman Memorial (horse only), Grand Army Plaza, New York, New York, 1892–1903
- Standing Pumas, Prospect Park, Brooklyn, New York, 1898
- Two Griffins, Saint Louis Art Museum, St. Louis, Missouri, 1904
- Lions for the McKinley Monument, Buffalo, New York, 1907
- Tigers, 16th Street Bridge, Washington, D.C., 1910
- Tigers, Princeton University, Princeton, New Jersey, 1910
- Buffalo, Q Street Bridge, Washington, D.C., 1914
- The Pioneer, University of Oregon, Eugene, Oregon, 1918
- Bucking Bronco, Civic Center, Denver, Colorado, 1920
- Theodore Roosevelt, Rough Rider, Portland, Oregon, 1922
- Theodore Roosevelt as a Rough Rider, Roosevelt Park, Minot, North Dakota, 1922
- On the War Trail, Civic Center, Denver, Colorado, 1922
- Indian Maiden and Fawn, 1917–1924
- The Circuit Rider, Oregon State Capitol, Salem, Oregon, 1924
- The Pioneer Mother, Kansas City, Missouri, 1927
- Buffalo Heads, Arlington Memorial Bridge, Washington, D.C., 1927
- The Western Sheriff [Tillman D. Taylor], Pendleton, Oregon, 1929
- McKnight Memorial Fountain, Wichita, Kansas, 1931
- The Pioneer Mother, University of Oregon, Eugene, Oregon, 1932
- Robert E. Lee on Traveller, 1936
- The Seven Mustangs, also known as Mustangs, Austin, Texas, 1948
- John McLoughlin, Salem, Oregon, 1953
- Jason Lee, Salem, Oregon, 1953
- Theodore Roosevelt Equestrian Sculpture, Oyster Bay, New York, poured posthumously

== Images ==
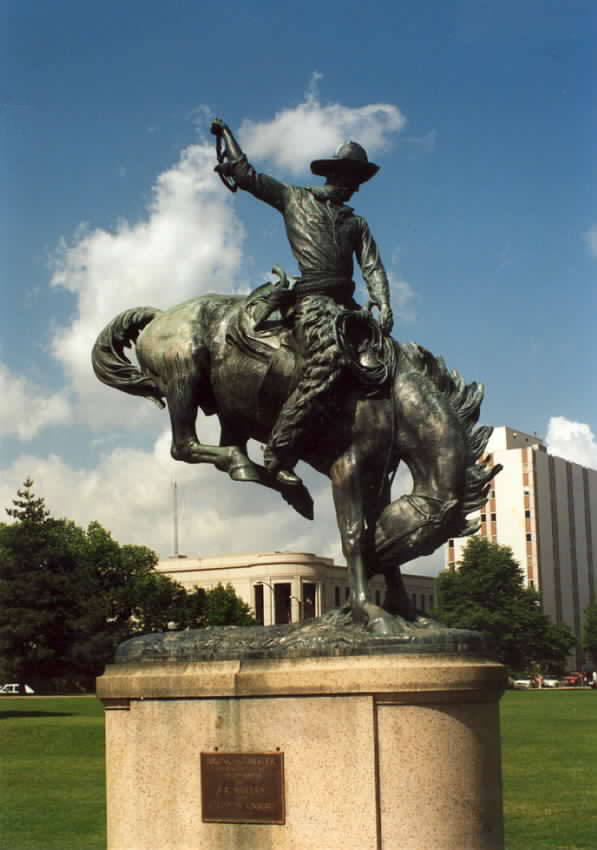
Bucking Bronco, Denver, Colorado

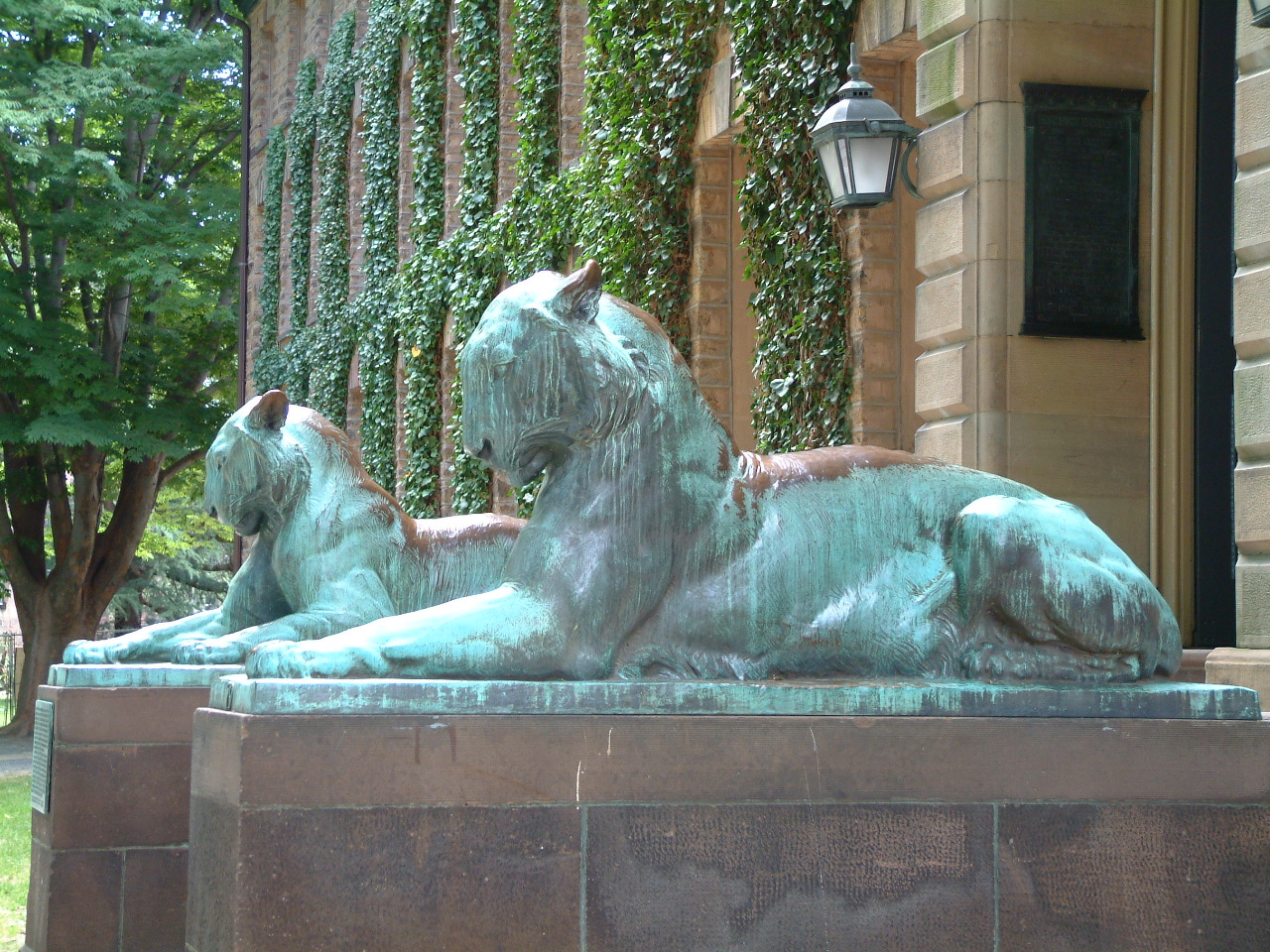
Bronze Tigers in front of Nassau Hall at Princeton University, 1910

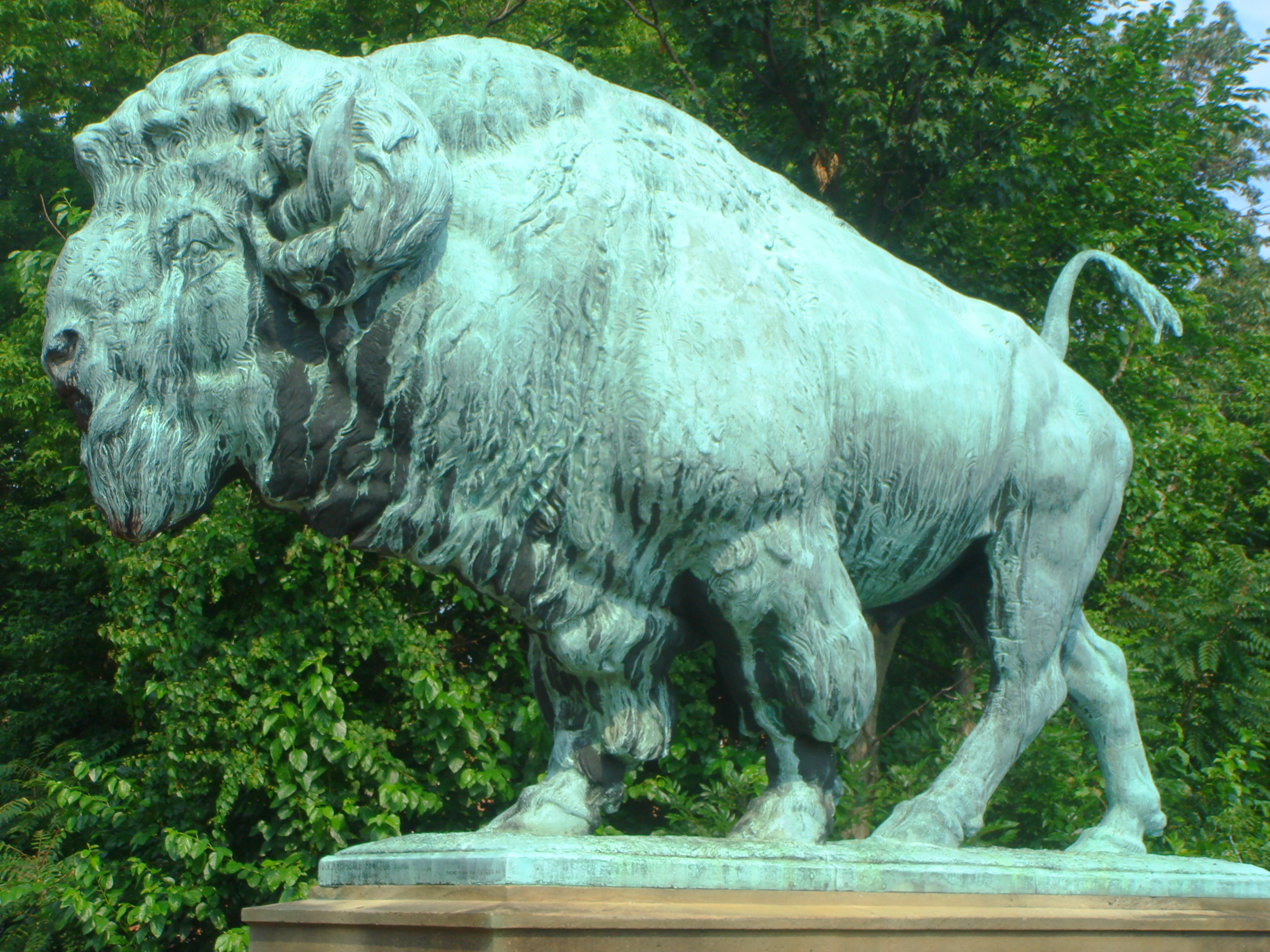
Buffalo, Dumbarton Bridge, Washington, D.C.

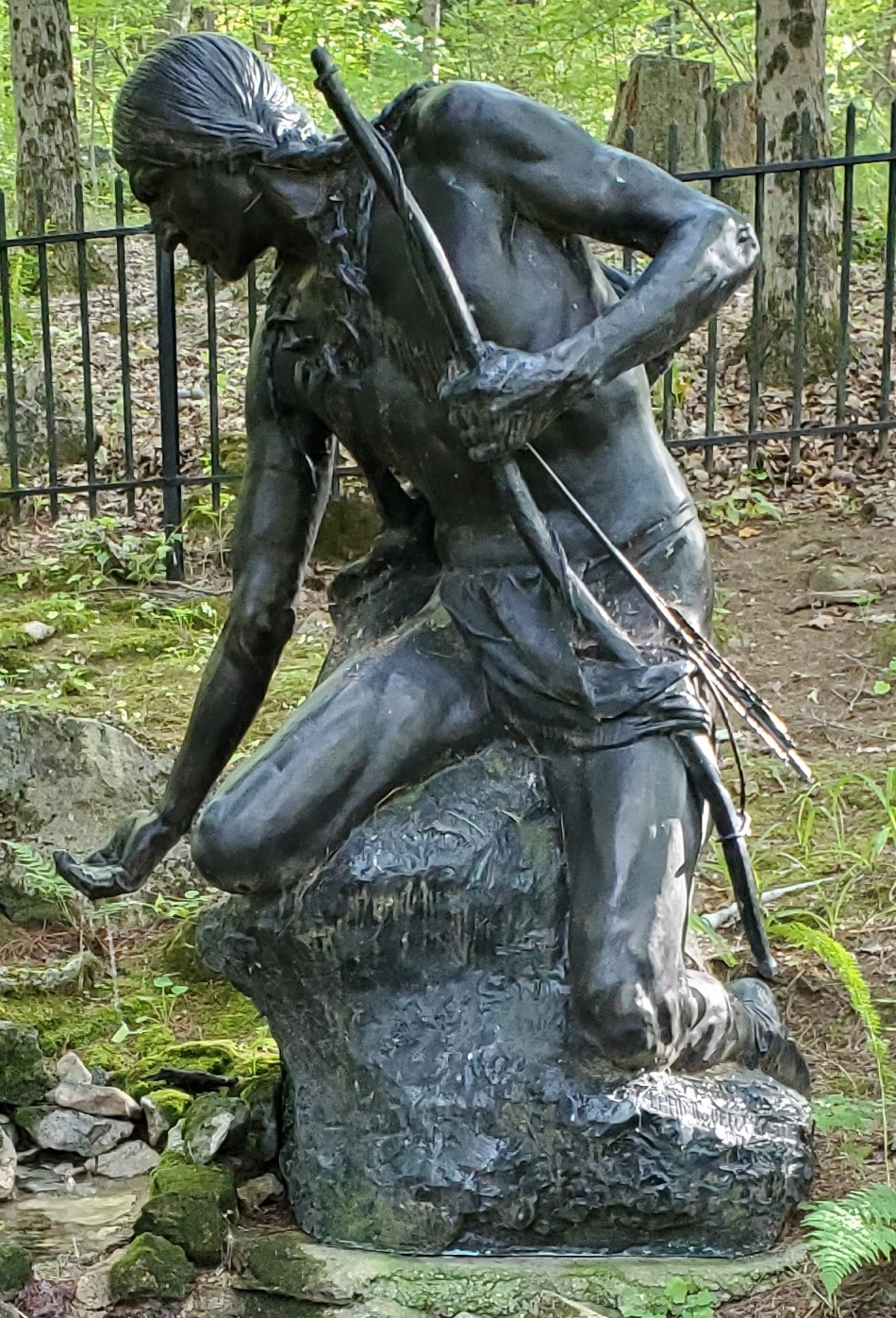
The Indian or Mohawk Warrior, Lake George Battlefield State Park, Lake George, New York

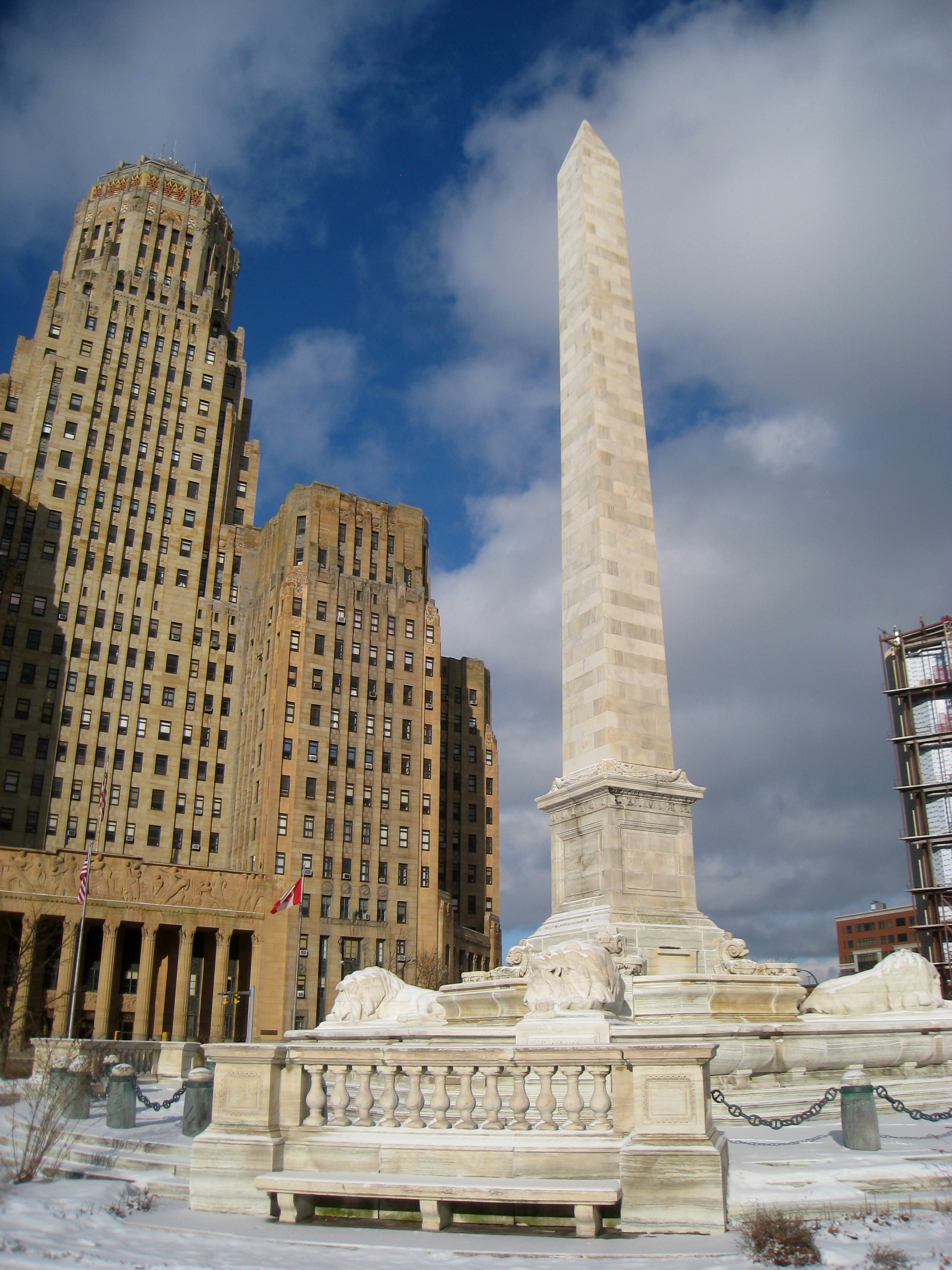
McKinley Monument, Buffalo, New York

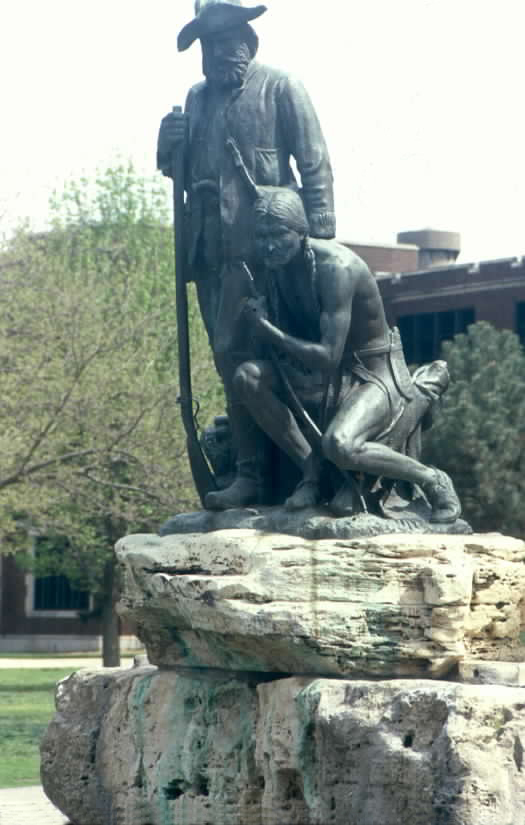
McKnight Memorial, Wichita, Kansas

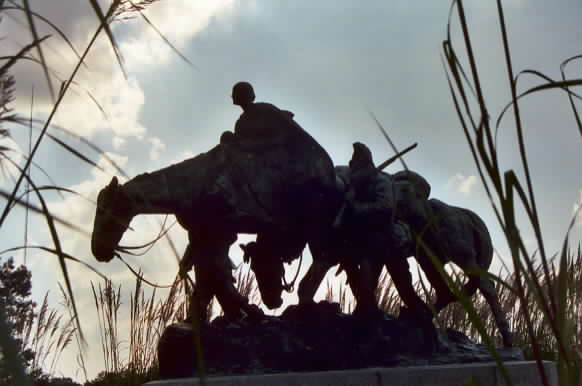
Pioneer Mother, Kansas City, Missouri

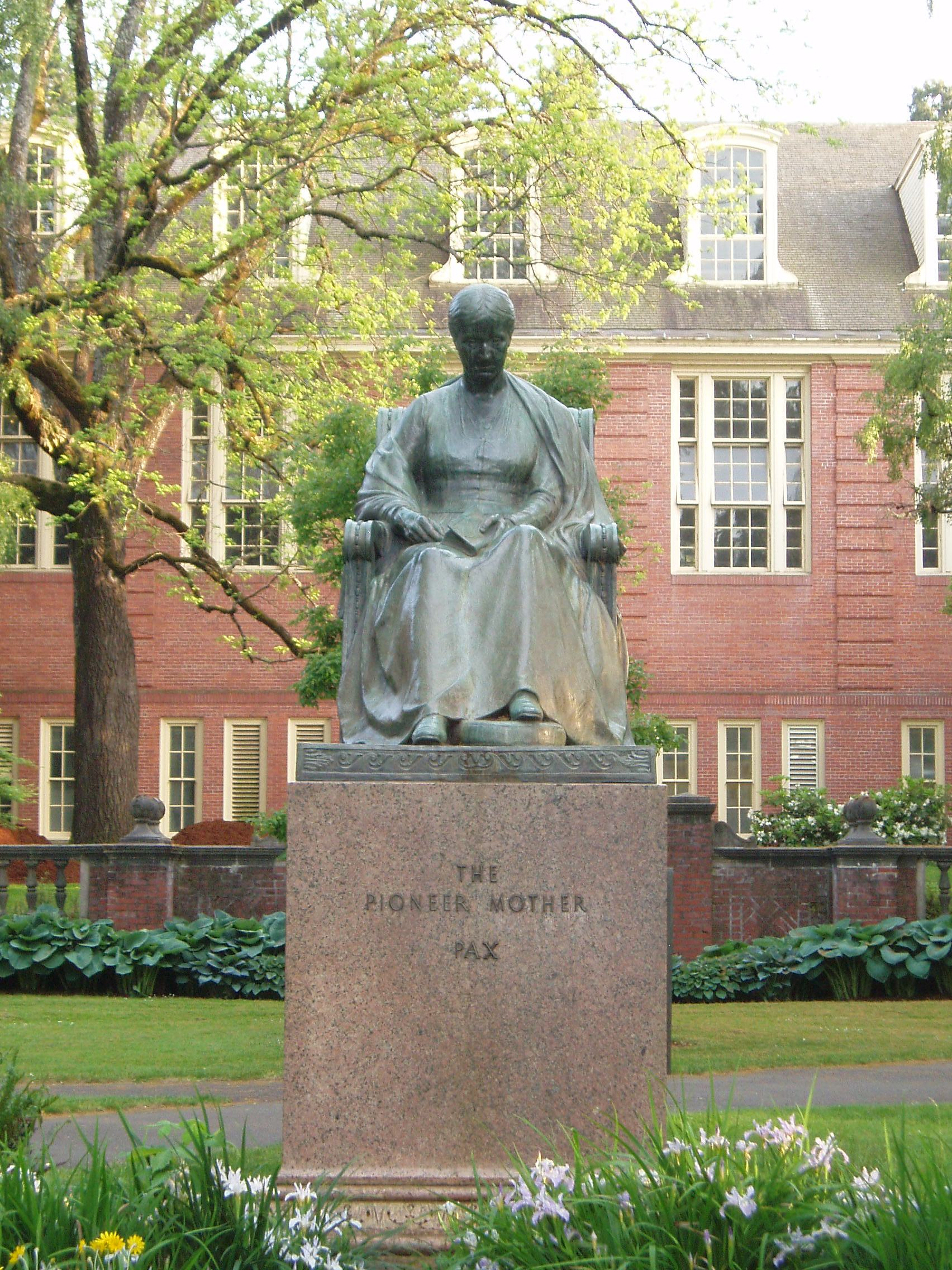
Pioneer Mother, Eugene, Oregon

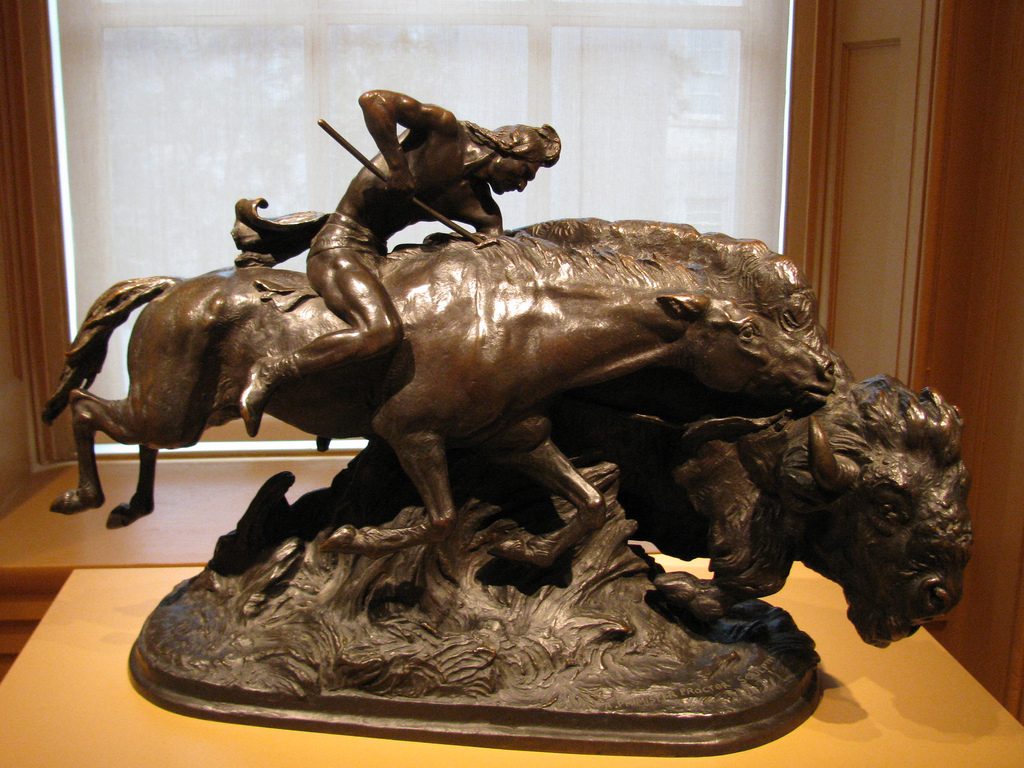
Riding down the Buffalo, Smithsonian American Art Museum, Washington, D.C.

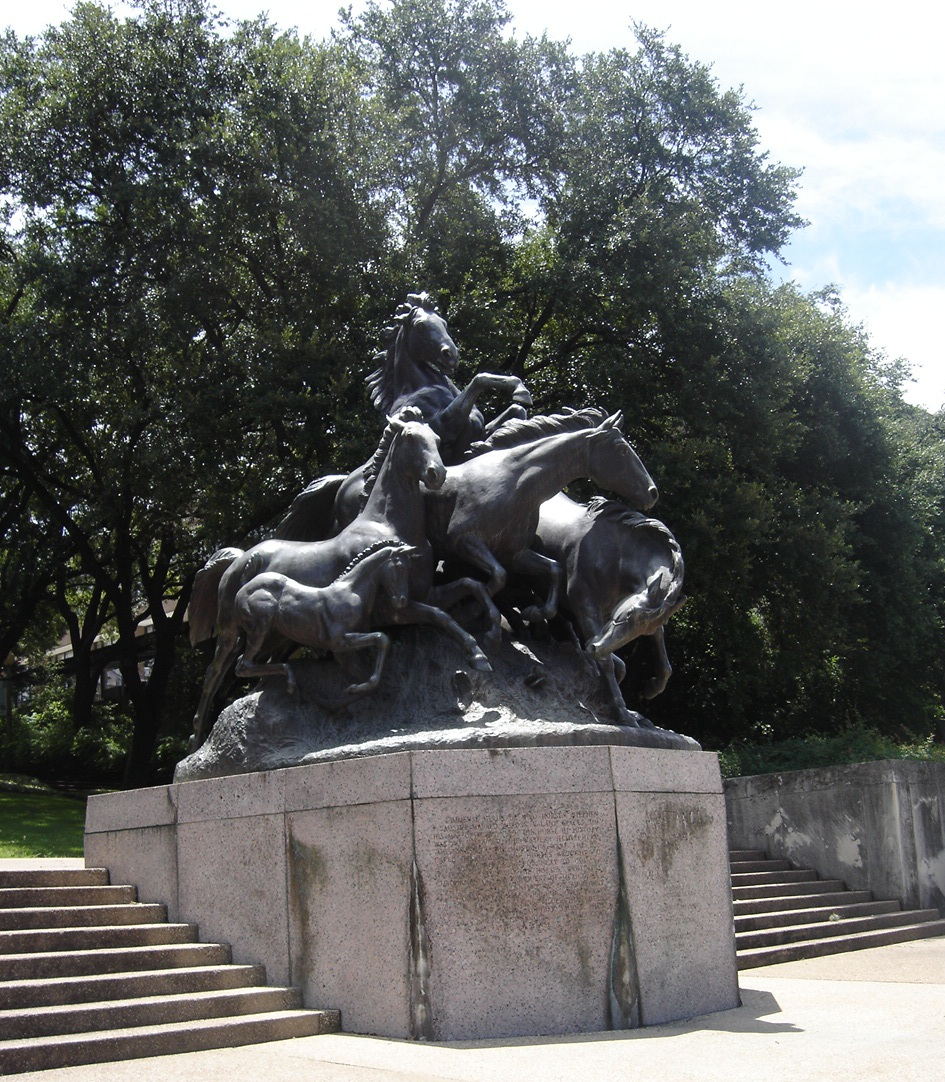
The Seven Mustangs, University of Texas Austin, Texas
