= Andrew Martz =

Russian sculptor

- Born: Андрей Валерианович Марц; 26 June 1924; Moscow, Soviet Russia
- Died: 20 October 2002 (aged 78); Moscow, Russian Federation
- Occupation: sculptor
- Years active: 1936-2002
- Known for: animal sculptures
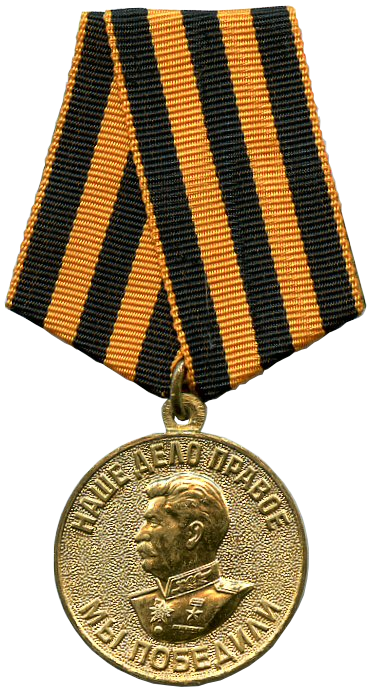
- Awards

Andrew (Andrey) Valerianovich Martz (Russian: Андрей Валерианович Марц; 26 June 1924 – 20 October 2002) was a Russian animal sculptor, Honored Artist of the RSFSR, who lived and worked in Moscow. His sculptures reside in State Russian Museum, State Tretyakov Gallery, National Gallery for Foreign Art, Kunstmuseum Stuttgart, Lithuanian National Museum of Art, Tallinn Zoo, in art museums and private collections in Russia and other countries of the world.

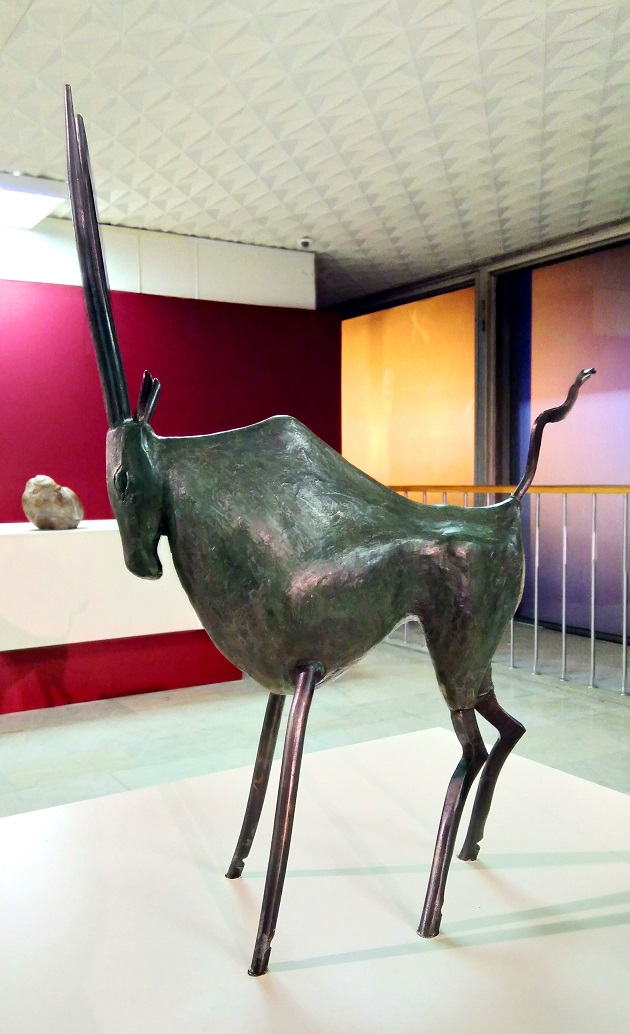
Andrew Martz — "Antelope" (bronze sculpture)

== Biography ==
Andrew Martz was born in Russia in Moscow on June 26, 1924. Studied at the Moscow School of Painting, Sculpture and Architecture. A large number of Andrei Marts's original sculptures are in the collections of 50 different museums in Russia, as well as in museums in Germany, Lithuania, Estonia, Uzbekistan and Kyrgyzstan. His sculptures were also produced at the Kasli foundry and Kusa foundry. Andrew Martz won various art competitions in the USSR and received several awards for this. Sculptures by Andrew Martz were also produced in the USSR in the form of plastic toys in factories. Andrew Martz published three books about his sculptures, gave interviews on Russian television and various print media. Personal and group exhibitions of sculptures by Andrew Martz were held in museums in the US, France, Germany, Norway, Denmark, Austria, Belgium, Japan, Russia, Latvia, Hungary, Poland, Romania, Bulgaria and Turkey.

== State and public awards ==
- Honored Artists of the RSFSR
- Medal "For the Victory over Germany in the Great Patriotic War 1941–1945"
- Diploma of Academy of Arts of the Soviet Union
- Member of the Russian Academy of Arts
