= Dumbarton Bridge (Washington, D.C.) =

- U.S. National Register of Historic Places
- D.C. Inventory of Historic Sites
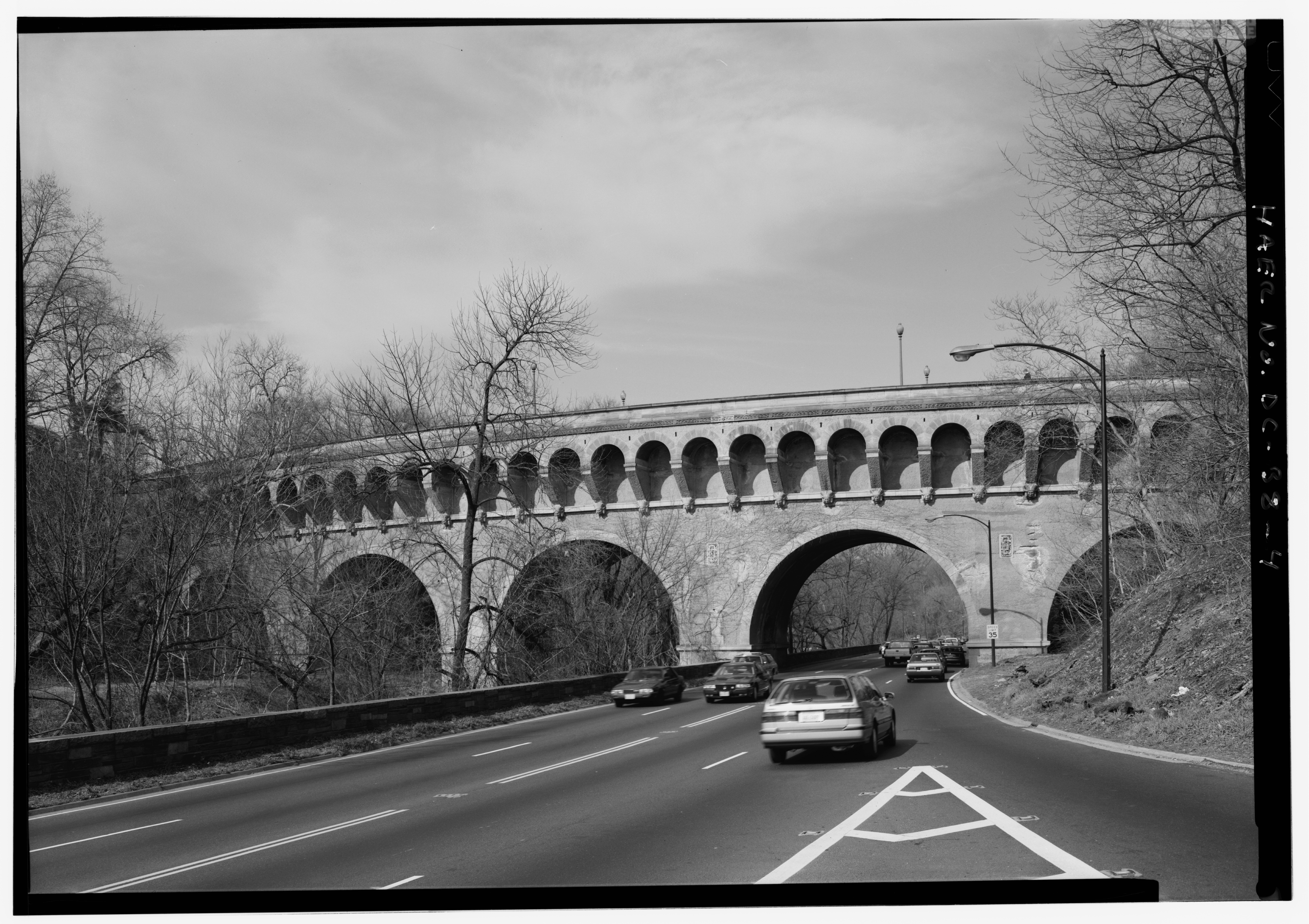
- Dumbarton Bridge (1915) Rock Creek Park between Dupont Circle and Georgetown, decorated with bronze buffalo statues designed by sculptor A. Phimister Proctor
- Location: Q Street, Northwest over Rock Creek Park; Washington, D.C.
- Coordinates: 38°54′39″N 77°3′4″W
- Built: 1915
- Architect: Glenn Brown; Alexander Proctor
- Architectural style: Romanesque Revival
- NRHP reference No.: 73002080

Significant dates
- Added to NRHP: July 16, 1973
- Designated DCIHS: November 8, 1964

The Dumbarton Bridge, also known as the Q Street Bridge and the Buffalo Bridge, is a historic masonry arch bridge in Washington, D.C.

Dumbarton Bridge was built between 1914 and 1915 to convey Q Street Northwest across Rock Creek Park between the city's Dupont Circle and Georgetown neighborhoods.

== History ==
=== Proposals ===
Around 1905, the residents of Georgetown wanted to reduce traffic to Washington along M Street. One frequently proposed idea was to divert the water of Rock Creek through a tunnel under current-day 27th Street NW, then fill in Rock Creek's beds, and extend Georgetown's streets to Washington. Many Georgetown residents disliked Rock Creek because it was filled with stagnant water and trash. The cost of diverting and filling in the creek was estimated to be $4.5 million. Estimates to build the bridge ranged from $150,000 to $200,000, while the estimate to divert and fill in the creek and extend streets $1.3 million.

Another idea was to move the Woodley Lane Bridge to the Q Street location rather than build a new bridge altogether. Engineers determined that the cost to move the Woodley Lane bridge would be too great and the Woodley Lane Bridge would not be available to be moved until its replacement, the Connecticut Avenue Bridge, was completed.

Legislation to fund the bridge's construction was introduced to Congress in December 1910, and Congress approved it two months later. Congress appropriated $275,000 to build the bridge and $75,000 to condemn property, including a land west of Rock Creek being used as a street car yard, in order to extend Q Street to the bridge.

=== Construction ===
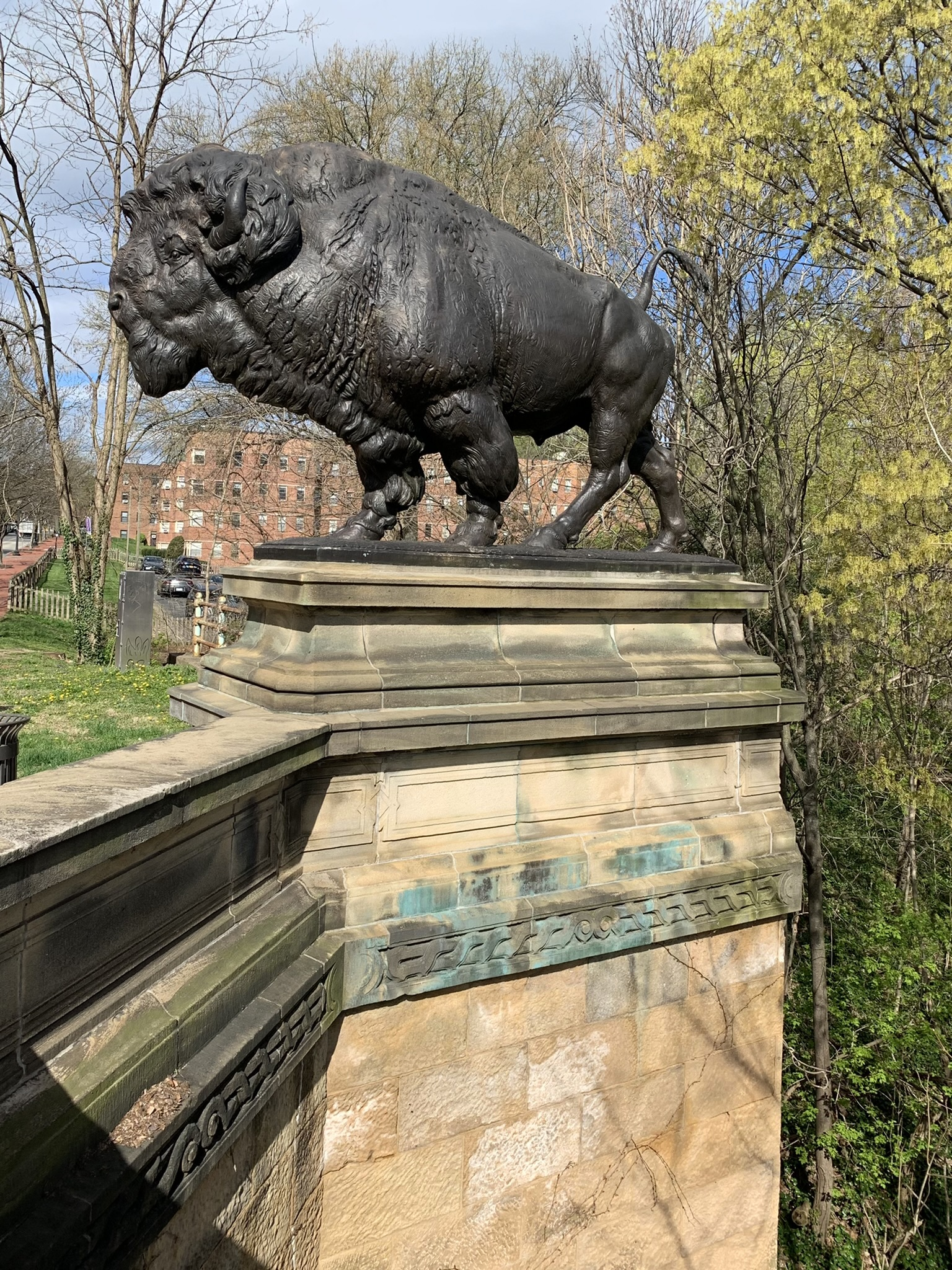
One of four buffalo sculptures on the Dumbarton Bridge, created by Alexander Phimister Proctor

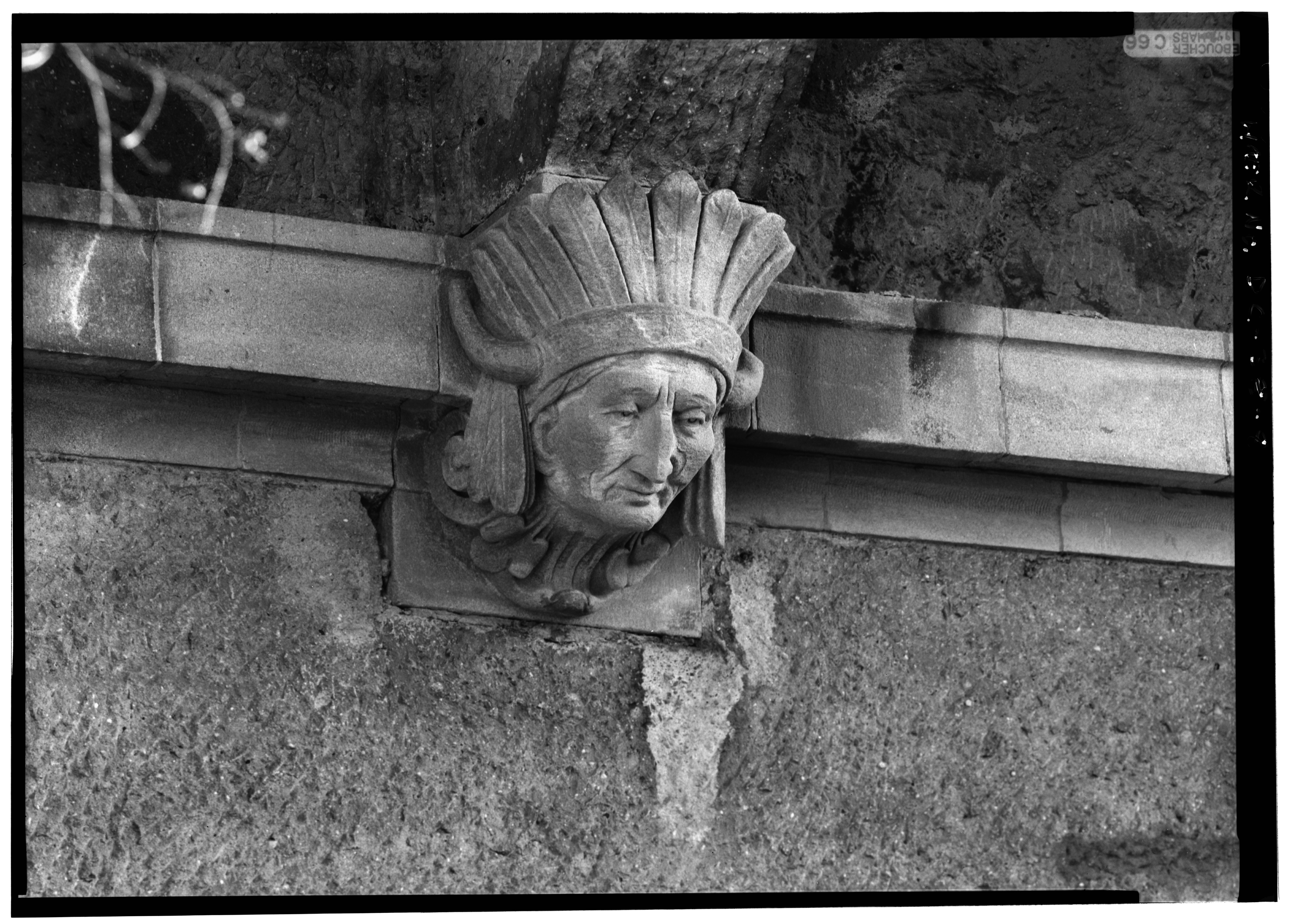
Sculpture from life mask of Kicking Bear by Glenn Brown, on Dumbarton Bridge

The bridge's design was by Glenn Brown, and the engineering design was by Daniel B. Luten.

The bridge is significant as showing the impact of the City Beautiful movement in Washington and the association of architects, engineers and sculptors with the city's new Commission of Fine Arts. The architects studied photographs of bridges around the world choosing as models a Roman aqueduct and a mountain bridge in Italy with intent to set a precedent for further city bridges. The color of the bridge's stone was intended to evoke the warm tones of Spain and Italy. Along with the buffalo theme the arches are decorated by Indian head designs by Glenn Brown based on a life mask of the Sioux Chief Kicking Bear in the Smithsonian Institution.

The curved design is due to need to match the section of Q Street NW in Dupont Circle that is slightly north of the section in Georgetown. In order to accommodate the bridge's approach and to keep the street continuous within Georgetown the Dumbarton House, then known as Bellevue, was moved about 100 feet (30 m) northward from its original site in the middle of the current Q Street to its present position on the north side of the Street.

The District requested bids to construct the bridge in June 1913, but none of the four bids were within the appropriated budget.

The plans were modified so that there would only be five spans rather than seven in order to save costs. The project went out to bid again in November. A.L. Guidone won the construction bid.

Its four buffalo sculptures, the largest cast in a single piece of bronze, are by Alexander Phimister Proctor, who also designed the tigers on the Sixteenth Street Bridge. The budget to build the bridge was set at $275,000.

Construction of the bridge began on March 14, 1914. Construction of the bridge was completed by October 1915, although it took two more months to grade and pave the roads leading up to the bridge.

=== Opening ===
The bridge was officially opened at 4 p.m. on December 24, 1915. It was then known as the Q Street Bridge. The bridge was lit by incandescent lamps.

The Commissioners of the District of Columbia officially gave it the name of Dumbarton Bridge on June 5, 1916. According to the Commissioners' written statement, "Dumbarton bridge commemorates the name of the tract of land upon which was laid out the easterly part of Georgetown, and to which Ninian Beall received letters patent from the British crown."

The Dumbarton Bridge was added to the National Register of Historic Places on July 16, 1973.

== See also ==
- List of bridges documented by the Historic American Engineering Record in Washington, D.C.
- List of bridges on the National Register of Historic Places in Washington, D.C.
- National Register of Historic Places listings in the District of Columbia
