= Francesco Negri (photographer) =

Italian photographer (1841–1924)

- Born: 18 December 1841; Tromello, Austrian Empire
- Died: 21 December 1924 (aged 83); Casale Monferrato, Italy
- Occupation: Photographer
- Spouse: Giulia Ravizza
- Children: Federico
- Parent(s): Angelo Maria Negri; Maria Magnaghi

Francesco Negri (18 December 1841 – 21 December 1924) was an Italian photographer known not only as a pictorialist but for his innovative work in photomicroscopy, in the development of the telephoto lens, and for his early experiments in Louis Ducos du Hauron’s techniques of colour photography. His scientific and cultural pursuits included botany and local history: in both fields, his publications remain significant. He served as Mayor of Casale Monferrato. In the meantime, by profession, he was a lawyer.

== Biography ==
Negri was born in Tromello in Lomellina (PV) to Angelo Maria Negri and Maria Magnaghi, who were well-off and well-connected. He attended secondary school in Vigevano, then took a law degree in Turin, graduating in 1861. The following year, he moved to Casale Monferrato, where he married Giulia Ravizza and pursued a career in a civil law.

Negri died in Casale on 21 December 1924.

== Published works ==
- Bergaglio, B. and Cavanna, P. (2006) Francesco Negri fotografo, 1841-1924. Milan: Silvana. ISBN 9788836607464
