= Art Brenner =

American painter

Art Brenner (1924–2013) was an American abstract sculptor and painter. Born in New York City, he lived and worked in Paris from 1964 to 2012.

He has had numerous solo and group exhibitions in cities such as Paris, London, Avignon, Barcelona, Brussels, Brest, Amsterdam, Heidelberg, Montreal, and Adelaide, Australia.

His work is in public collections in France, Spain, and the United States (Rose Art Museum at Brandeis University in Waltham, Massachusetts; Wadsworth Atheneum, Hartford, Conn.; Anchorage Museum of History and Art, Anchorage, Alaska). He was also the subject of a short CNN film, "An American Sculptor in Paris" (1995). The French government has honored him by inducting him as a "Chevalier de l'Ordre des Arts et des Lettres", the French equivalent of induction into the American Academy of Arts and Letters.

== Concern with sculptural monumentality and architecture ==
As a sculptor whose works are frequently large and created for public, architectural settings, Brenner wrote a 1971 article for Leonardo magazine (MIT Press) entitled "Concerning Sculpture and Architecture", in which he observes that "the monumental scale of modern sculpture... has quickly moved sculpture from the private to the public sector, that is toward a renewal of its relation with architecture." He also notes that "It has been argued that modern architecture by its very nature, its functionalism and purity, has little need for sculpture."

Rejecting this analysis, he nevertheless acknowledges that the aesthetic values of modern architecture do require a careful approach to the use of monumental sculpture in conjunction with modern buildings, and that "architects should engage sculptors as essential members of a team".
