= Henry Waldo Coe =

American politician (1857–1927)

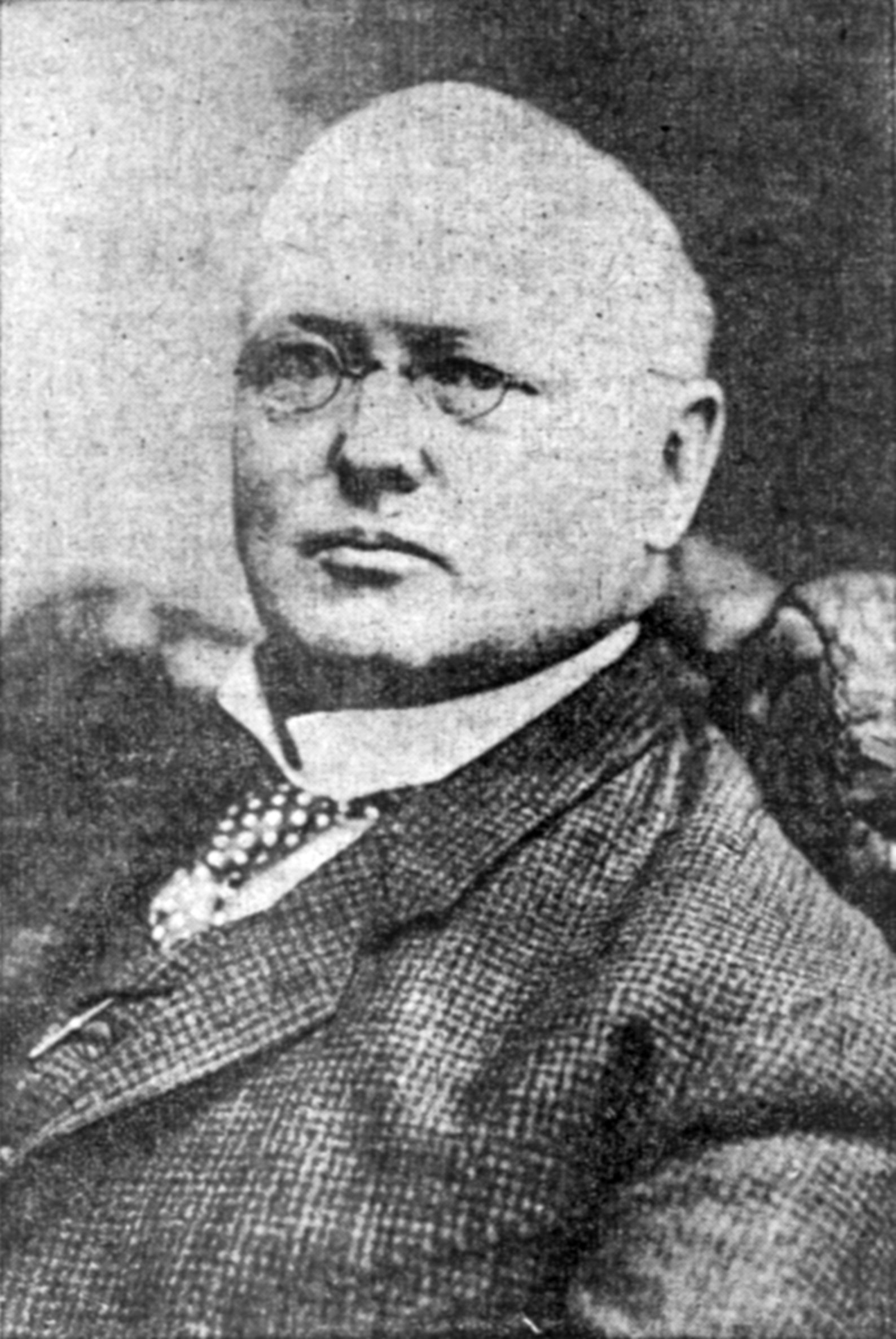
- Coe c. 1903
- Born: November 4, 1857; Waupun, Wisconsin
- Died: February 15, 1927 (aged 69); Glendale, California
- Education: University of Minnesota; University of Michigan- Ann Arbor; Long Island College Hospital
- Occupations: Physician, politician
- Spouse: Viola née Boley
- Parent(s): Samuel Buell Coe and Mary Jane (née Cronkhite)
- Relatives: Homer W. Hillyer (cousin); Descendants of Robert Coe

Henry Waldo Coe (November 4, 1857 – February 15, 1927) was a United States frontier physician and politician.

Coe was born in Waupun, Wisconsin, to Samuel Buel Coe and his wife Mary Jane (née Cronkhite). After his education and training, Coe went on to become a pioneer doctor in the Dakota Territory, a member of the territorial legislature, and close friend of Theodore Roosevelt.

== Biography ==
When he was very young Coe and his parents moved to Morristown, Minnesota. After graduating from high school, Coe took classes at the University of Minnesota. He supplemented his studies under the tutelage of his father, also a physician, and attending classes at the University of Michigan - Ann Arbor. He graduated from Long Island College Hospital in New York in July 1880. He moved to Mandan, North Dakota and was among the first physicians to settle in the Dakota Territory. He was elected to the last territorial legislature (1885) before the territory was divided and achieved statehood. He also served as mayor of Mandan.

While in the Dakota Territory, Coe met the young Theodore Roosevelt, who had gone there to regain his health. Their friendship lasted until Roosevelt's death in 1919.

He and his wife Viola (Boley) Coe, also a physician, moved to Portland, Oregon in 1890 where they focused on treating nervous and mental diseases, and where he owned and operated the Morningside Hospital. He quickly rose to a prominent position in financial and political affairs of the Northwest. He was president of the First National Bank of St. Johns, Oregon, president of the First National Bank of Kelso, Washington, vice-president of the Scandinavian-American Bank of Portland, Oregon, director of the Scandinavian-American Savings Bank of Astoria, Oregon, one of the proprietors of the Сое-Furnish Irrigation Project of Stanfield, Oregon, and also had extensive mining interests.

In 1906, he was president of the American Medical Editor's Association.

Always an active Republican he was a delegate to the Republican National Conventions at Chicago in 1904 and 1908, and in 1906 and 1907 was a member for Portland in the Oregon State Senate. As a close friend of Theodore Roosevelt, during his presidency Coe served as a confidential representative of his interest in Oregon. He and his wife would be invited on numerous occasions to lunch at the White House, as guests of both President Theodore Roosevelt and Howard Taft. Dr. Coe and his wife were among a group assigned in 1907 to travel to Panama to report to then President Theodore Roosevelt on working conditions during the construction of the Panama Canal. Henry Waldo Coe would later serve as one of the party leaders of the national Progressive Party i.e. "Bull Moose Party" in the early 1900s. He served a president of Oregon's Roosevelt League.

After retiring from practice in 1920, Henry and his second wife traveled extensively in Europe, Africa, Asia, and South America. He died after a heart attack in Glendale, California.

== Statues ==
=== Oregon ===
Coe commissioned and donated four statues to the city of Portland in the 1920s.

The Alexander Phimister Proctor statue of Theodore Roosevelt, was in the South Park Blocks. Coe knew Roosevelt in 1884-1886 and went on hunting trips with him. Coe paid $40,000 for the statue.

The equestrian statue of Joan of Arc, in Laurelhurst, Portland, Oregon, was made from the original molds of Emmanuel Frémiet's statue at the Place des Pyramides, which Coe saw on a visit to France. Portland's Arc statue arrived from France in 1924 and was dedicated on Memorial Day, May 30, 1925, honoring the Doughboys of World War I.

Two additional statues were in progress but were erected after Coe's death in 1927. One is the statue of Abraham Lincoln by George Fife Waters, commissioned in 1926 and dedicated at its South Park Blocks location on October 5, 1928. The second was George Washington, a statue by Pompeo Coppini, which was dedicated on July 4, 1927. It stood at 57th Avenue and Sandy Boulevard, in the center of the Rose City Park neighborhood.

All of his statues but the Equestrian statue of Joan of Arc were removed during the mass protests of 2020.

=== North Dakota ===
Coe would donate a copies of "Theodore Roosevelt Rough Rider" statue to two cities in North Dakota. According to the Inventory of American Sculpture (IAS), the Mandan, North Dakota sculpture is a smaller version of the one commissioned by Coe for Portland in 1920. This statue was dedicated on July 2, 1924, and is located downtown in Heritage Park. A second small version of the statue was also created and donated to the City of Minot, North Dakota by Coe in 1924. It is a key feature of the city's Roosevelt Park.
