= Turgenev (surname) =

Turgenev (masculine, Russian: Тургенев) or Turgeneva (feminine, Russian: Тургеневa) is a Russian surname which derives from the Mongolian word "Тургенев" (turgen, meaning fast/quick).

Notable people with the surname include the following:

- Ivan Petrovich Turgenev (fl. 1796–1803), rector of the Moscow State University
- Alexander Turgenev (1784-1846), Russian historian and statesman
- Nikolay Turgenev (1789–1871), Russian economist
- Ivan Turgenev (1818-1883), Russian novelist and playwright, who is the eponym of the main-belt asteroid 3323 Turgenev
- Pierre-Nicolas Tourgueneff (1853–1912) (original spelling was "Turgenev"), French sculptor and painter
