= Equestrian statue of Joan of Arc (Portland, Oregon) =

Statue by Emmanuel Fremiet in Portland, Oregon

Joan of Arc
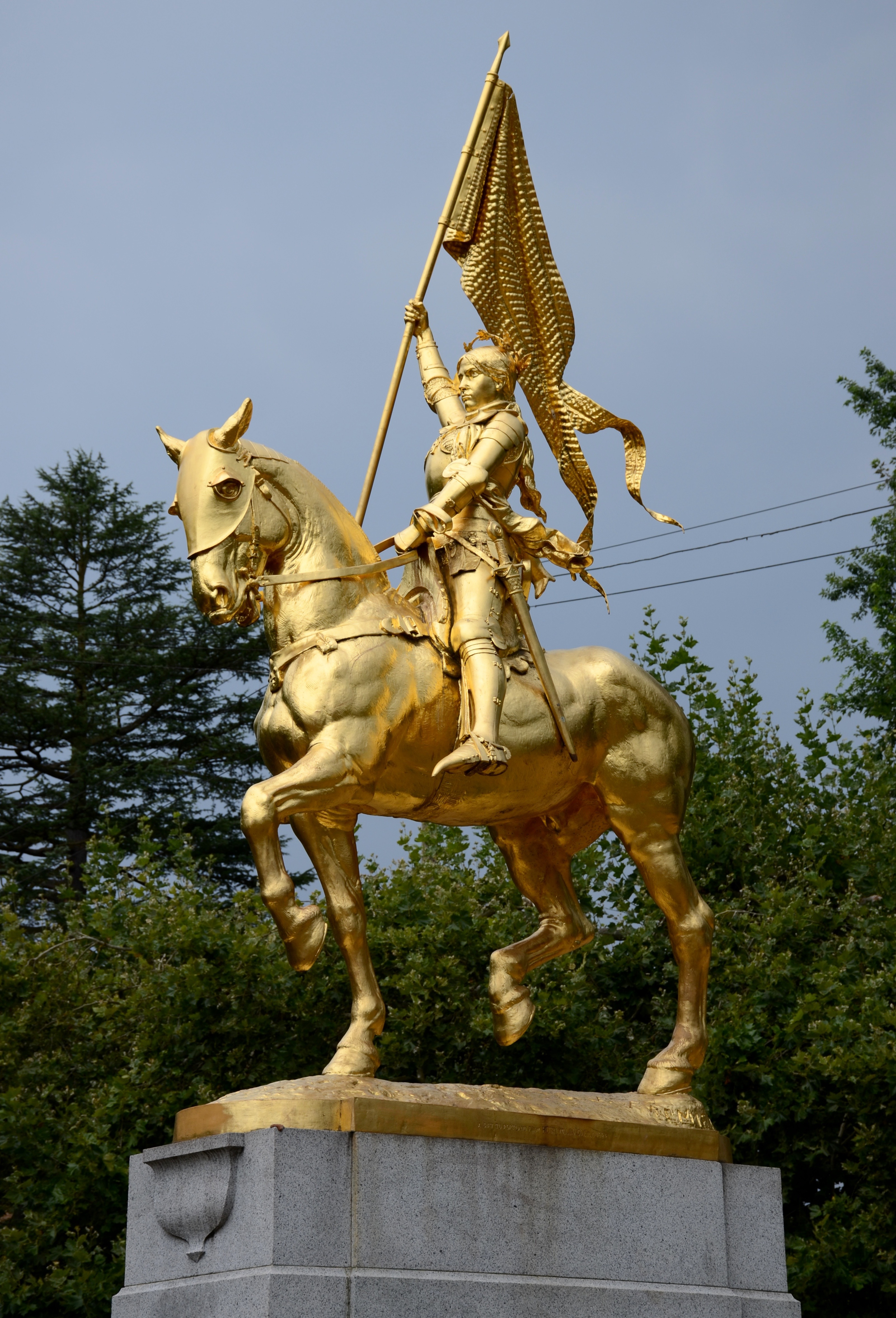
- The sculpture in 2015
- Artist: Emmanuel Frémiet
- Year: 1925
- Type: Sculpture
- Medium: Sculpture: Bronze, copper Base: Granite
- Subject: Joan of Arc
- Location: Portland, Oregon, United States; 45.52633°N 122.62301°W

Joan of Arc, also known as Joan of Arc, Maiden of Orleans, is an outdoor copy of Emmanuel Frémiet's equestrian statue Jeanne d'Arc (1874), installed in Portland, Oregon's Laurelhurst neighborhood, in the United States. The bronze sculpture, which depicts Joan of Arc, was donated to the city by Henry Waldo Coe, who saw Frémiet's original statue in Paris. Portland's copy arrived from France in 1924 and was dedicated on Memorial Day in 1925 in honor of the Doughboys of World War I.

== Description ==
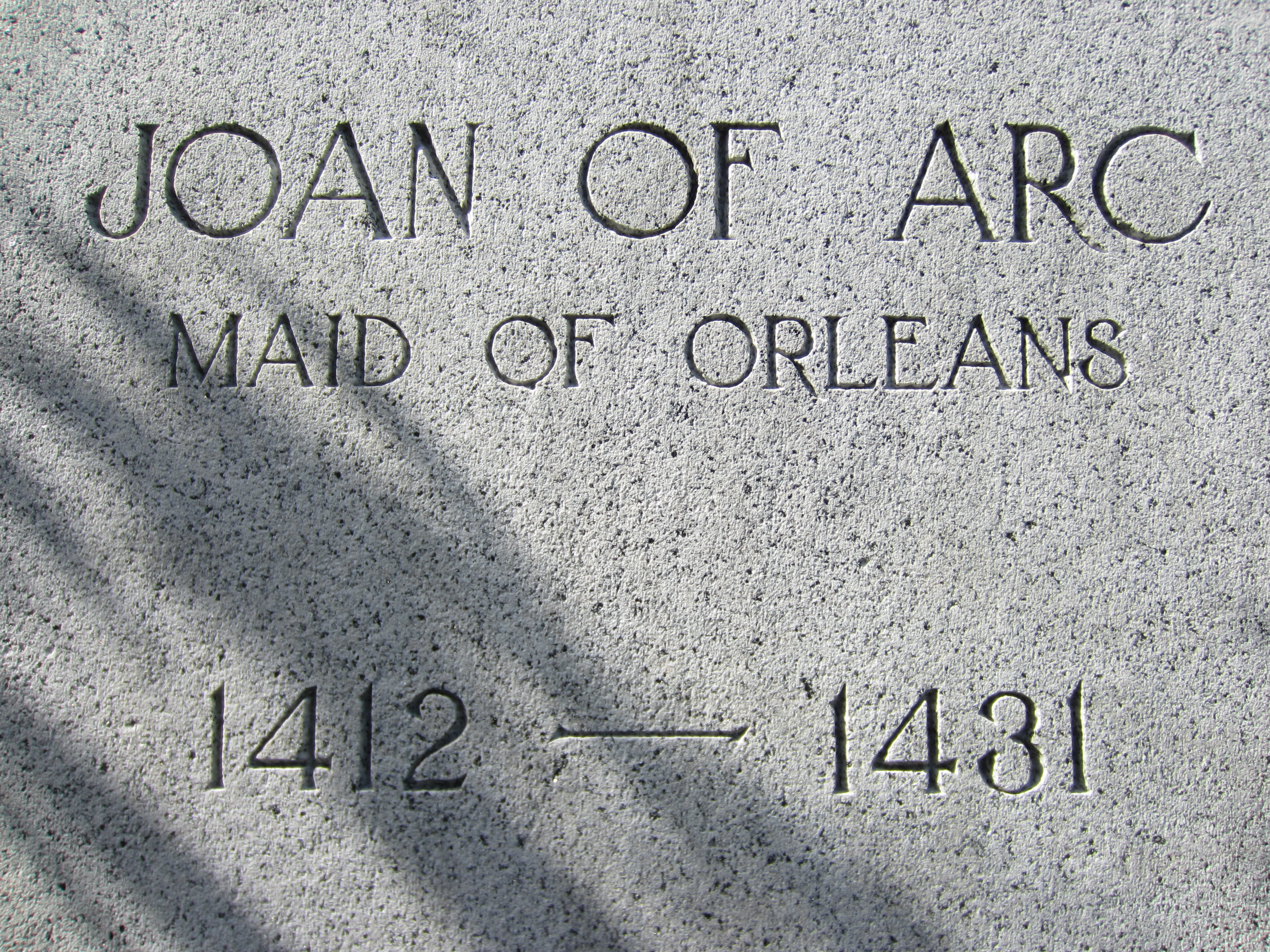
Detail of an inscription

Joan of Arc is an outdoor equestrian statue installed in Coe Circle, at the intersection of Northeast Cesar E. Chavez Blvd. (formerly 39th) and Glisan, in Portland's Laurelhurst neighborhood. The sculpture is one of several copies of Emmanuel Frémiet's 1874 gilded bronze statue, Jeanne d'Arc, which is installed at the Place des Pyramides in Paris.

Portland's statue is also made of bronze and measures approximately 12 feet (3.7 m) x 5.5 feet (1.7 m) x 9 feet (2.7 m). The flag held by Joan of Arc is made of copper. The statue rests on a granite base that measures approximately 8 feet (2.4 m) x 3 feet (0.91 m) x 9 feet (2.7 m). The tax conservation commission did not allow for the cost of the granite base that the statue sits upon to be paid for by the city of Portland so, both Dr. Coe's Wife and mother paid for the $4000 granite base. To choose the design for the base the city art commission and the Portland chapter of architects held a contest. Margaret Goodin Fritsch, the first woman to graduate from the School of Architecture at University of Oregon, won first place and her design was chosen. The granite base itself was made by Blaesing Granite works.

== History ==
The statue was added to Coe Circle in 1925. It was one of four statues given by Henry Waldo Coe to the City of Portland. It was made from the original molds of Frémiet's statue, which Coe saw on a visit to France. Portland's statue arrived from France in 1924 and was dedicated on Memorial Day, May 30, 1925, honoring the Doughboys of World War I. Dr. Coe chose to gift a statue of Joan of Arc because she was the patron saint of the Doughboys while they fought in Europe during World War I. It is reported that the Doughboys would sing Joan of Arc, They Are Calling You as they marched into battle. Dr. Coe is quoted as saying the singing of this song, "...had much to do in reviving the drooping spirits of the French and bringing victory out of defeat" and at the unveiling ceremony of the statue the Royal Rosarian quartet sang that song.

Over the years the gold leaf that brilliantly adorned the statue slowly deteriorated until there was no trace of its luster and the artwork was surveyed by the Smithsonian Institution's "Save Outdoor Sculpture!" program in 1993. In 2002, through the fundraising efforts and after receiving a grant for $24,000, the city of Portland was able to have the statue restored to its former glory. The pennant flag held in Joan's right hand and the laurel wreath on her head were replaced and the gold leaf was restored.

== See also ==
- 1925 in art
- Cultural depictions of Joan of Arc
- List of equestrian statues in the United States
