= Laurelhurst =

Laurelhurst may refer to:

- Laurelhurst, Portland, Oregon, a neighborhood in Portland, Oregon
- Laurelhurst Park, a city park in Portland, Oregon
- Laurelhurst Theater, a theater in Portland, Oregon
- Laurelhurst, Seattle, a neighborhood in Seattle, Washington
