= Tourgueneff =

Tourgueneff may refer to:

== Family name ==
- Pierre-Nicolas Tourgueneff, French animalier, sculptor, and painter
- Ivan Tourguéneff, Russian novelist, short story writer, poet, playwright, translator and popularizer of Russian literature in the West

== See also ==
- Turgenev (surname)
