= Brick House Beautiful =

Historic building in Portland, Oregon, U.S.

- U.S. National Register of Historic Places
- U.S. Historic district – Contributing property
- Portland Historic Landmark
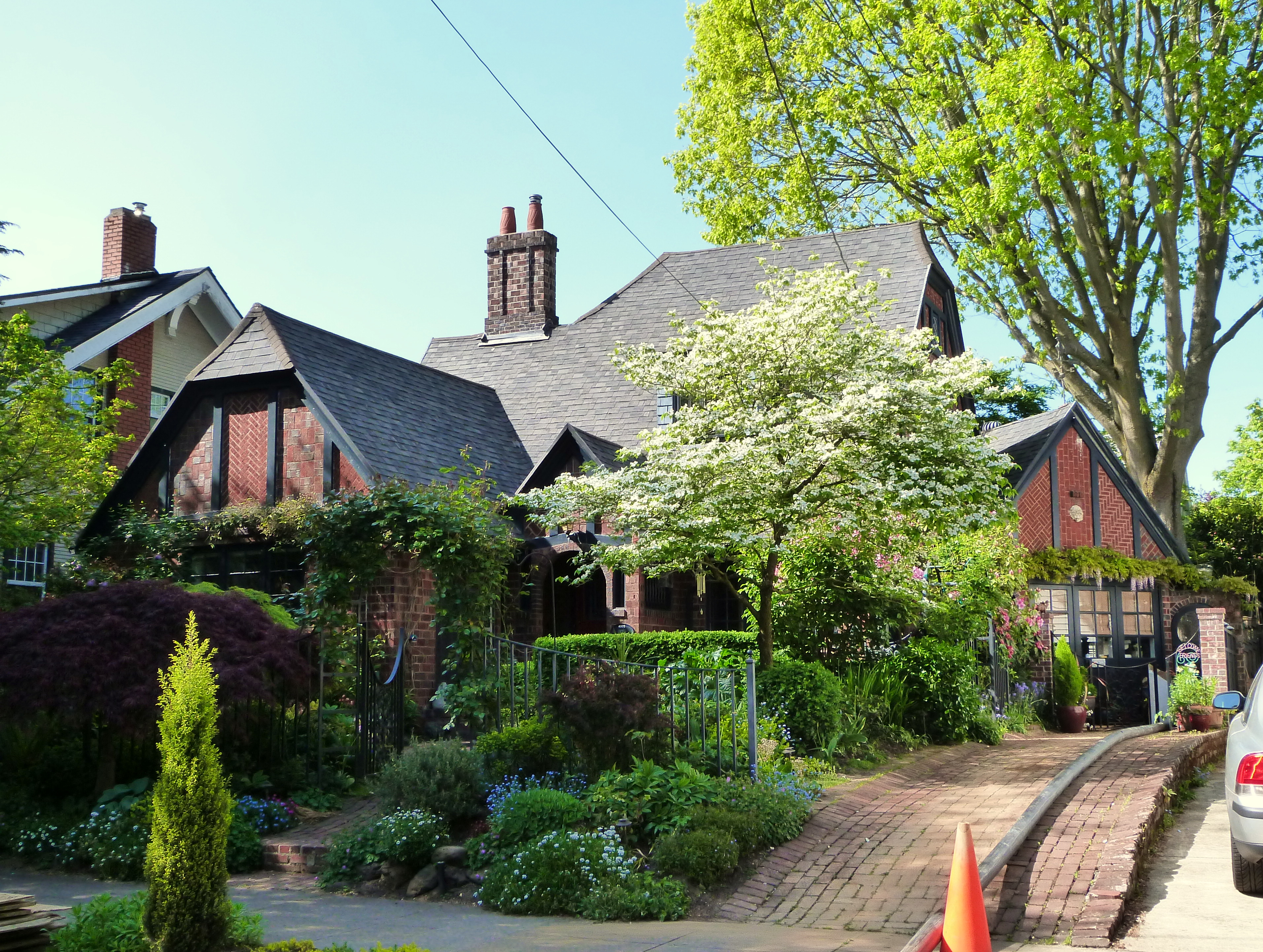
- The house's exterior in 2013

- Location within Portland, Oregon
- Location: 4005 NE Davis St. Portland, Oregon
- Coordinates: 45°31′31″N 122°37′18″W
- Built: 1922–1923
- Architect: Otis J. Fitch
- Part of: Laurelhurst Historic District (ID100003462)
- NRHP reference No.: 11001063
- Added to NRHP: January 27, 2012

The Brick House Beautiful is a historic house located in northeast Portland, Oregon, United States. It was built in 1922–1923 to be a model house showcasing the product line of the Standard Brick & Tile Company, based in Portland. It was also a demonstration project for the brick hollow-wall method of construction, newly introduced in the Portland market to reduce cost and improve affordability of brick houses.

It was listed on the National Register of Historic Places in 2012.

== See also ==
- National Register of Historic Places listings in Northeast Portland, Oregon
