= Homer W. Hillyer =

American chemical engineer and professor (1859 – 1949)

- Born: Homer Winthrop Hillyer; January 26, 1859; Waupun, Wisconsin
- Died: January 3, 1949 (aged 89); Glastonbury, Connecticut
- Occupations: Professor; Chemical engineer
- Spouse: Harriet Robbins (m. 1887)
- Parent: Edwin Hillyer (father)
- Relatives: Arthur Hillyer Ford (nephew); Henry Waldo Coe (cousin); Descendants of Robert Coe

Academic background
- Education: Ripon College; University of Wisconsin (BS); Johns Hopkins University (PhD)
- Thesis: Methods for determining the relative stability of the fatty bromides (1885)
- Doctoral advisor: Ira Remsen

Academic work
- Discipline: Chemistry
- Sub-discipline: Organic chemistry, pharmaceutical chemistry, applied chemistry, horticulture
- Institutions: University of Wisconsin
- Notable ideas: Suspended atomic sulfur as a fungicide

Homer Winthrop Hillyer (January 26, 1859 – January 3, 1949) was an American chemistry professor, chemical engineer, inventor, and horticulturist. He taught at the University of Wisconsin (UW) for twenty years before moving to Buffalo, New York, New York City, and Farmington, Connecticut, where he worked in the chemical industry until his retirement in 1925. He developed fungicides using atomic sulfur for fruit after obtaining a patent for agricultural products using suspended sulfur.

Hillyer was born in Waupun, Wisconsin, to industrialist and politician Edwin Hillyer and Angeline née Coe, a descendant of American colonial Robert Coe. His cousin Henry Waldo Coe was a physician and politician. His nephew Arthur Hillyer Ford was an electrical engineer and professor at Iowa State University.

Hillyer married Harriet Robbins in 1887. Robbins's father was a lobbyist for the automotive industry in Baltimore. They had no children. They helped found the Farmington Poetry Club.

== Education and career ==
Hillyer attended Ripon College before finishing his bachelor's degree in chemistry at UW in 1882. He was awarded a scholarship, followed by a graduate fellowship, at Johns Hopkins University where his research focused on aluminum alcoholates, phenoxy-ozone compounds, and phenyl ether derivatives. He was awarded his PhD in chemistry in 1885.

After receiving his PhD, Hillyer was a chemistry instructor at UW. In 1889, he was offered a professorship there to teach organic chemistry. He was one of the earliest educators in UW's school of pharmacy. He stayed there until 1905, when he decided to pursue his interest in research into pomology, in particular, growing fruit trees. A colleague suggested that Connecticut was a better place to grow apples than California, so he and his wife moved to Farmington, Connecticut.

Hillyer took a research position at General Chemical Company, where he worked on fungicide research until 1917, which took him to New York City part time. He then worked at their successor, National Aniline & Chemical Co. in Buffalo, New York, until his retirement, at which time he and his wife returned to Farmington. He died in hospice care in 1949.

== Publications ==
- Kahlenberg, Louis; Hillyer, H. W. (1894). "Solubility of Metallic Oxides in Normal Potassium Salts of Tartaric and Other Organic Acids". American Chemical Journal. 16: 94–115.
- Remsen, Ira; Hillyer, Homer W. (1886). "Methods for Determining the Relative Stability of the Alkyl Bromides". American Chemical Journal. 8: 251.
- Hillyer, H. W. (1899). Laboratory Manual: Experiments to Illustrate the Elementary Principles of Chemistry. New York: The Macmillan Company.
- Hillyer, H. W. (1903). "On the cleansing power of soap". Journal of the American Chemical Society. 25 (5): 511–524. doi:10.1021/ja02007a010. ISSN 0002-7863.
- Hillyer, Homer Winthrop (1885). Methods for Determining the Relative Stability of the Fatty Bromides (PhD). Johns Hopkins University.
- Hillyer, Homer W. (1890). "A Self-Regulating Gas-Generator on a New Principle". American Chemical Journal. 12: 228.
