= La Place des Pyramides, Paris =

Painting by Giuseppe De Nittis

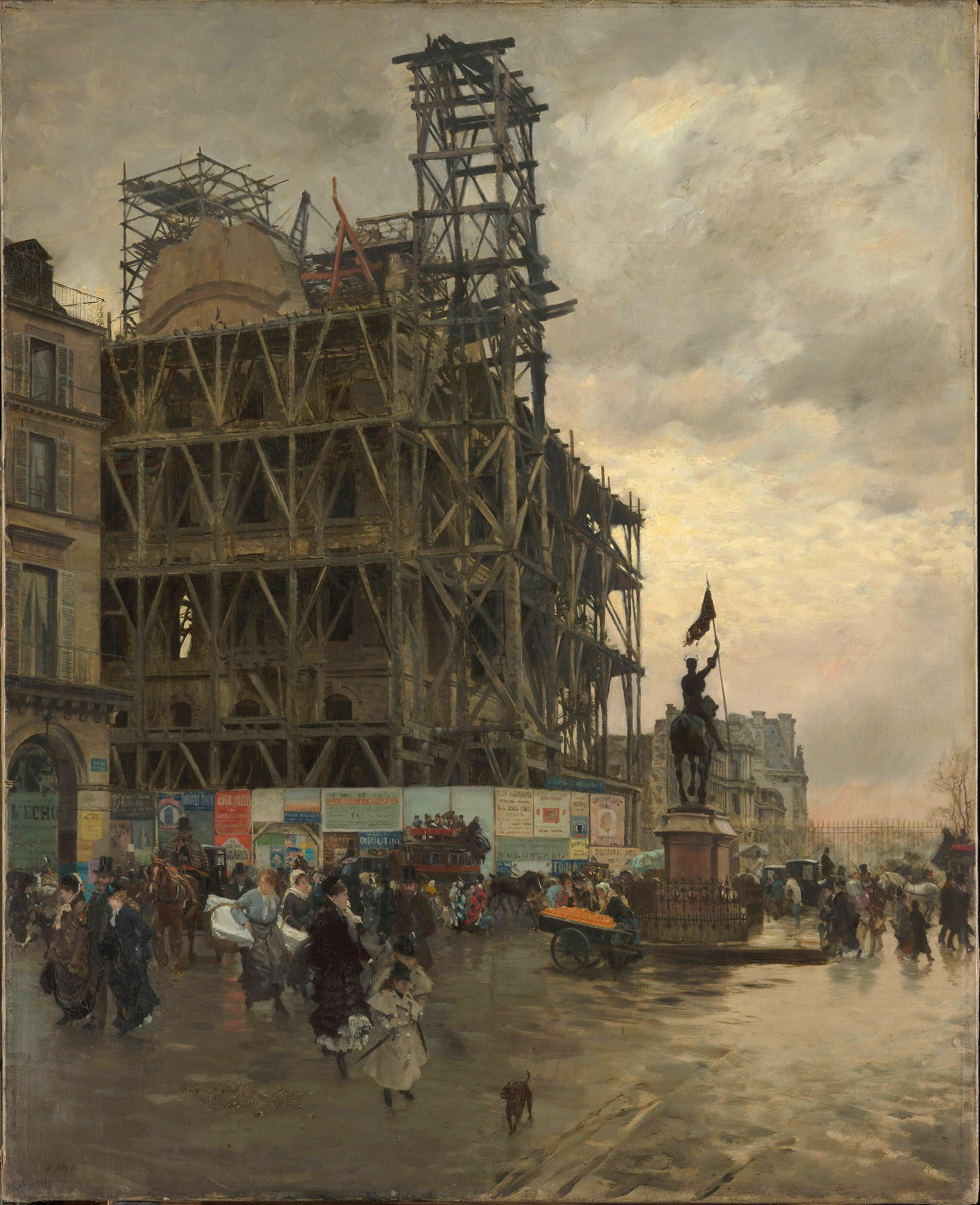
- Artist: Giuseppe De Nittis
- Year: 1875
- Type: Oil on canvas, landscape painting
- Dimensions: 92.3 cm × 75 cm (36.3 in × 30 in)
- Location: Musée d'Orsay, Paris

La Place des Pyramides, Paris is an oil painting on canvas by the Italian artist Giuseppe De Nittis, from 1875. It is held at the Musée d'Orsay, in Paris.

== History and description ==
This cityscape features a view of the Place des Pyramides, a public square in Paris. De Nittis was part of the Impressionist movement, having recently arrived from Italy. Resented as a foreigner by some fellow artists, the choice of this landscape was consciously designed to evoke French patriotism. The rebuilding of the Pavillon de Marsan, combined with the recently erected statue of Joan of Arc, symbolises the renewal of the city and the nation during the Third Republic. In the background, a scaffold surrounds the remains of the Tuileries Palace that been burned down by the Communards in 1871. Several people of different social classes, men, women and children, and strolling carriages are also seen in the scene. The attention of the two girls, accompanied by their mother, at the center of the painting, seems to be attracted by a stray dog.

The painting was displayed at the Salon of 1876 in Paris. In 1878, at the time of the Exposition Universelle at which it was exhibited, the artist bought the painting back from its owner, Adolphe Goupil, in order to present it to the French nation. Today it is located in the city's Musée d'Orsay.

== Bibliography ==
- Boime, Albert. Art and the French Commune: Imagining Paris after War and Revolution. Princeton University Press, 2022.
- Broude, Norma. World Impressionism. Harry N. Abrams, 1994.
- Carter, Karen L. & Waller, Susan Foreign Artists and Communities in Modern Paris, 1870-1914. Routledge, 2017.
- Morel, Dominique & Angiuli, Emanuela. Giuseppe De Nittis: la modernité élégante. Paris musées, 2010.
