= Turgeniopsis =

Scientific classification
- Kingdom: Plantae
- Clade: Embryophytes
- Clade: Tracheophytes
- Clade: Spermatophytes
- Clade: Angiosperms
- Clade: Eudicots
- Clade: Asterids
- Order: Apiales
- Family: Apiaceae
- Subfamily: Apioideae
- Tribe: Scandiceae
- Subtribe: Torilidinae
- Genus: Turgeniopsis; Boiss.
- Species: T. foeniculacea

Binomial name
- Turgeniopsis foeniculacea (Fenzl) Boiss.

Synonyms
- Genus: Glochidotheca Fenzl, not validly publ.; Species: Glochidotheca foeniculacea (Fenzl) Fenzl; Turgenia foeniculacea Fenzl

Genus of flowering plants

Turgeniopsis is a monotypic genus of flowering plants belonging to the family Apiaceae. It contains only one known species, Turgeniopsis foeniculacea. The earlier synonym Glochidotheca is also used as the accepted genus name, but Plants of the World Online states that it was not validly published.

== Description ==
It is an annual. It has erect and branched, stems which grow up to 20–40 cm (8–16 in) high. It has leaves which are 3–4-pinnate, with very fine capillary segments. It blooms between April and May. The white, about 1 mm across flowers, are compound umbels on long peduncles and it has 2–3 rays of partial umbels with 2–3 hermaphrodite and several male flowers in the centre. After it has flowered, between May and June, it produces a seed capsule (fruit). It is about 8 by 3.5 mm, are elliptic (in shape), with hooked spines. It is pollinated by insect. Reproduction is carried out by seeds, which are dispersed through zoochory (by animals) or barochory (dropping by gravity).

== Taxonomy ==
The name Glochidotheca was published in 1843 by Eduard Fenzl, earlier than Turgeniopsis was published by Pierre Edmond Boissier in 1844, and some sources use Glochidotheca as the accepted genus name. However Plants of the World Online states that Glochidotheca was not validly published and so uses Turgeniopsis.

The genus name of Turgeniopsis is in honour of Alexander Turgenev (1784–1845), a Russian statesman and historian. The Latin specific epithet of foeniculacea is derived from Foeniculum (fennel).

It is placed in subfamily Apioideae and tribe Scandiceae subtribe Torilidinae.

== Range and habitat ==
It is native to Bulgaria and parts of western Asia: Iran, Iraq, Lebanon, Syria and Turkey. In 2011, it was found in Israel.

It is listed as critically endangered in Bulgaria, and is threatened by he poor competitive ability of the species and its small population; overgrazing and strong soil erosion.

It grows in stony grasslands and scrubland, on screes, hillsides, on limestone bedrock, usually on shallow soil in the oak-forests belt. It grows at altitudes of 500–1,500 metres (1,600–4,900 ft) above sea level.

It can be found growing with Inula aschersoniana, Agropyron brandzae, Koeleria simonkaii, Polygala rhodopea, Medicago rhodopea, Galium rhodopeum, Jasminum fruticans, and others.
