= Jeanne d'Arc (Frémiet) =

1874 statue by Emmanuel Frémiet

Coordinates: 48.863819°N 2.332028°E

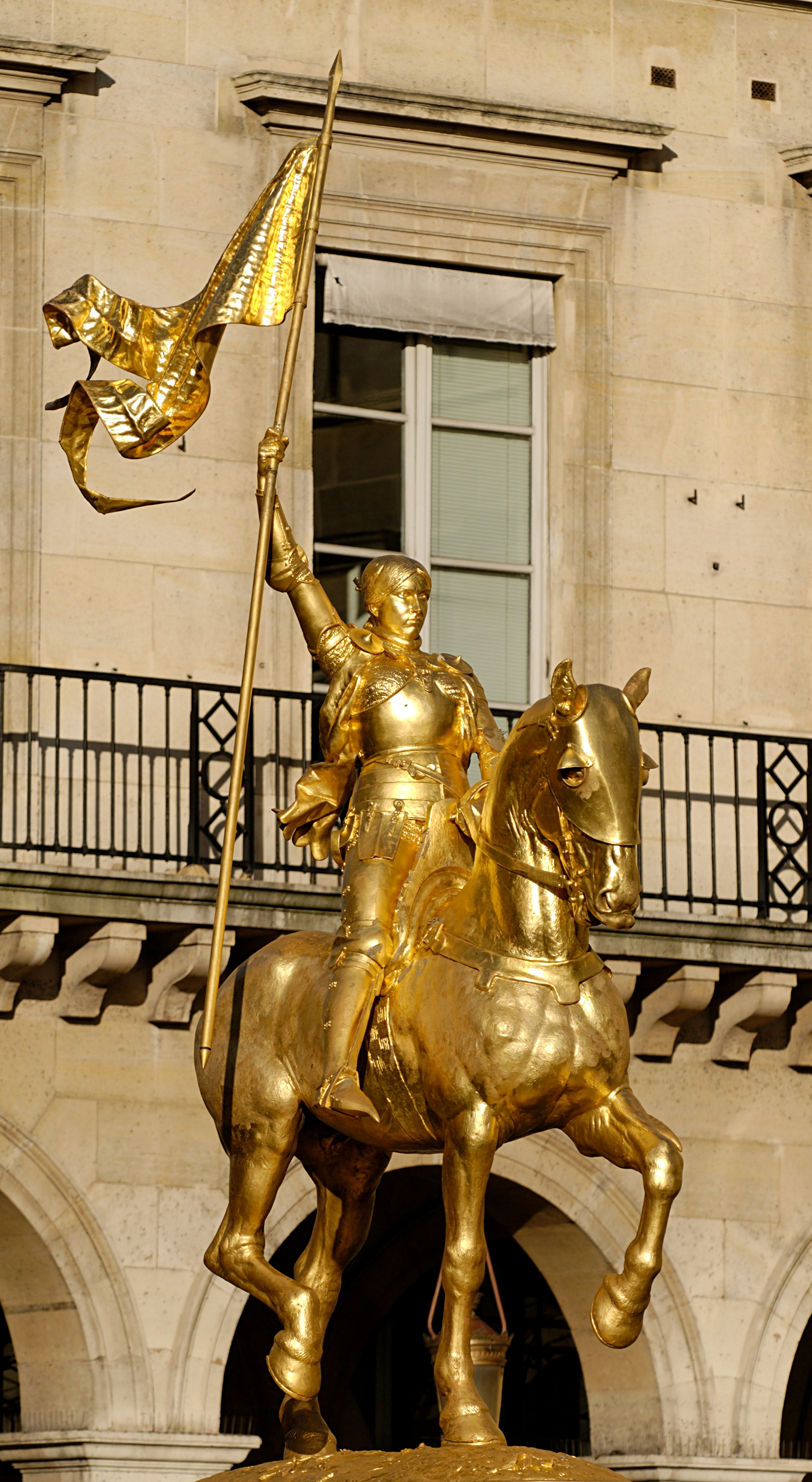
- Year: 1874
- Type: Gilded Bronze
- Dimensions: 400 cm (13 ft)
- Location: Paris

Jeanne d'Arc (English: Joan of Arc) is an 1874 French gilded bronze equestrian sculpture of Joan of Arc by Emmanuel Frémiet. The outdoor statue is prominently displayed in the Place des Pyramides in Paris.

== History ==
The original statue was commissioned by the French government following the country's defeat in the 1870 Franco-Prussian War. It is the only public commission by the state from 1870 to 1914, a period often called the Golden Age of statuary in Paris; other statues from this era were funded by private subscriptions.

The sculptor took as his model Aimée Girod (1856–1937), a young woman from Domrémy, Joan of Arc's village in Lorraine.

The statue was inaugurated in 1874. The pedestal was designed by the architect Paul Abadie.

The artist, who made another version of the monument for the city of Nancy in 1889, replaced the horse of the Parisian monument 10 years later by a copy of the smaller Nancy one, which earned him criticism.

The monument was classified as a historic monument on March 31, 1992.

Reviving a tradition from the far-right leagues, on every May Day, the National Front holds an annual ceremony in her honour at the statue.

== Locations ==
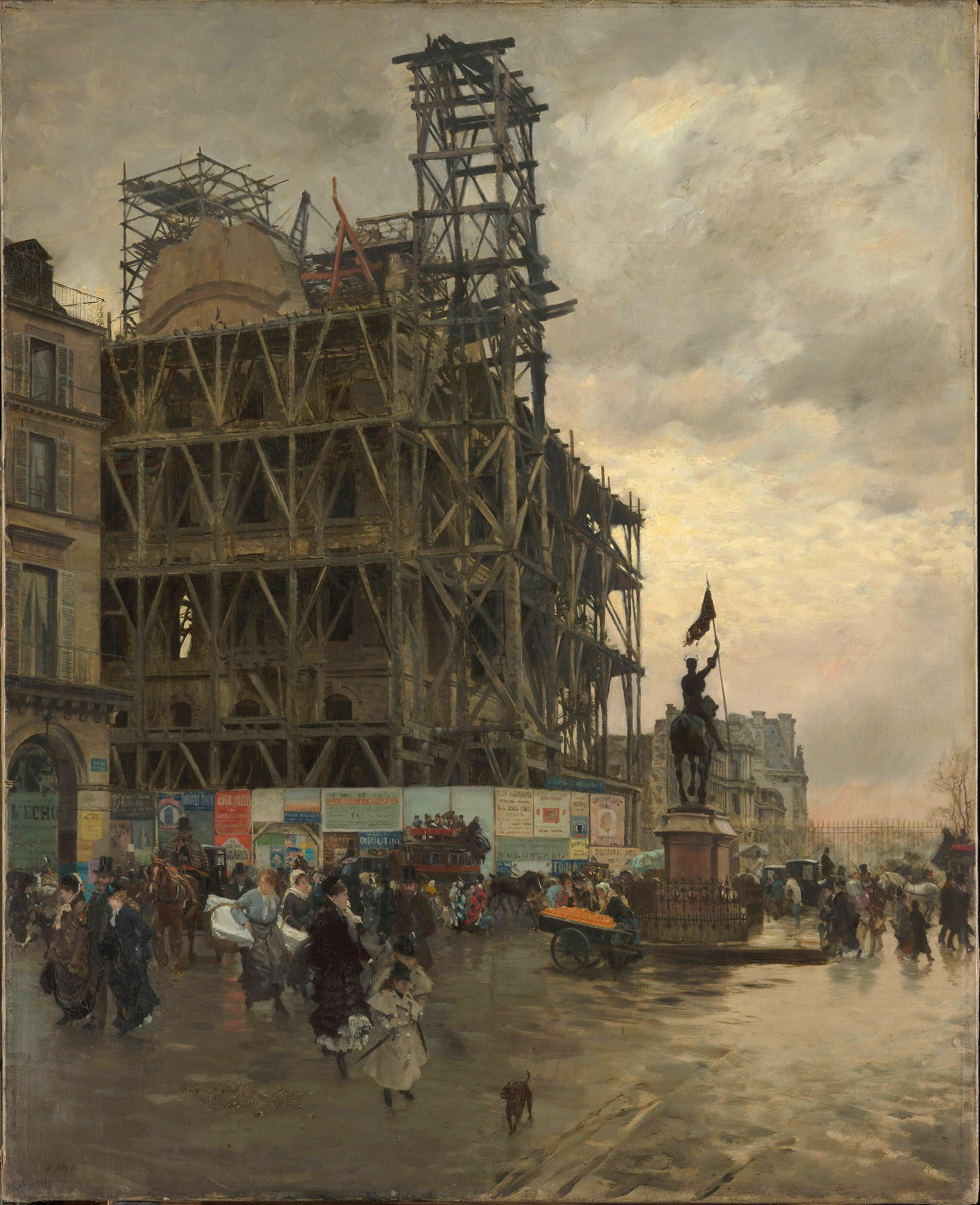
La Place des Pyramides, Paris by Giuseppe De Nittis. An 1875 painting featuring the newly-installed statue

The original work is located at the Place des Pyramides, in Paris, near where Joan of Arc was wounded during her failed attempt to take Paris.

Other copies can be seen at:

- Nancy, France,
- New Orleans,
- Philadelphia,
- Portland, Oregon (Joan of Arc),
- Melbourne, Australia.

New York

== Gallery ==
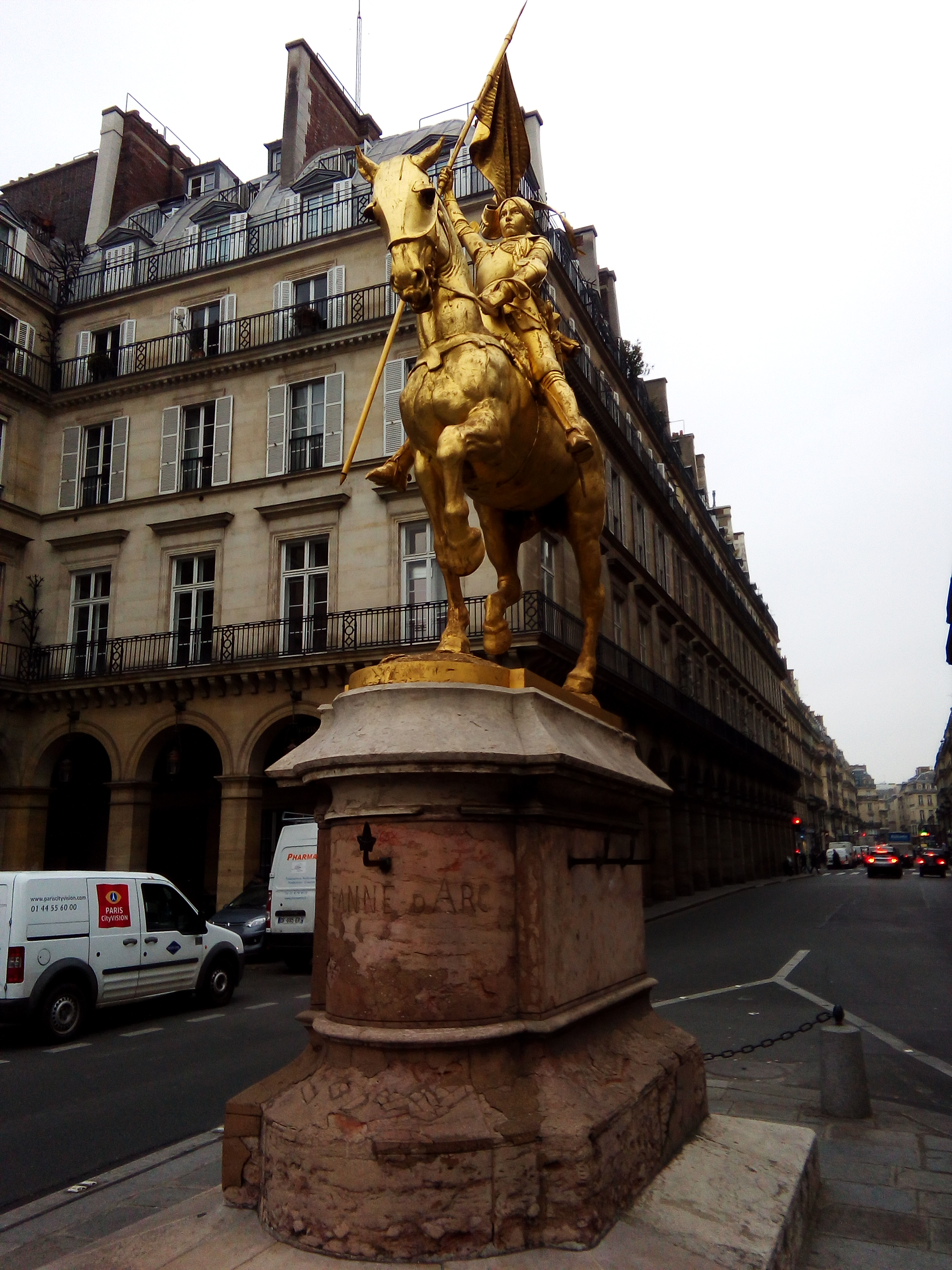
Paris

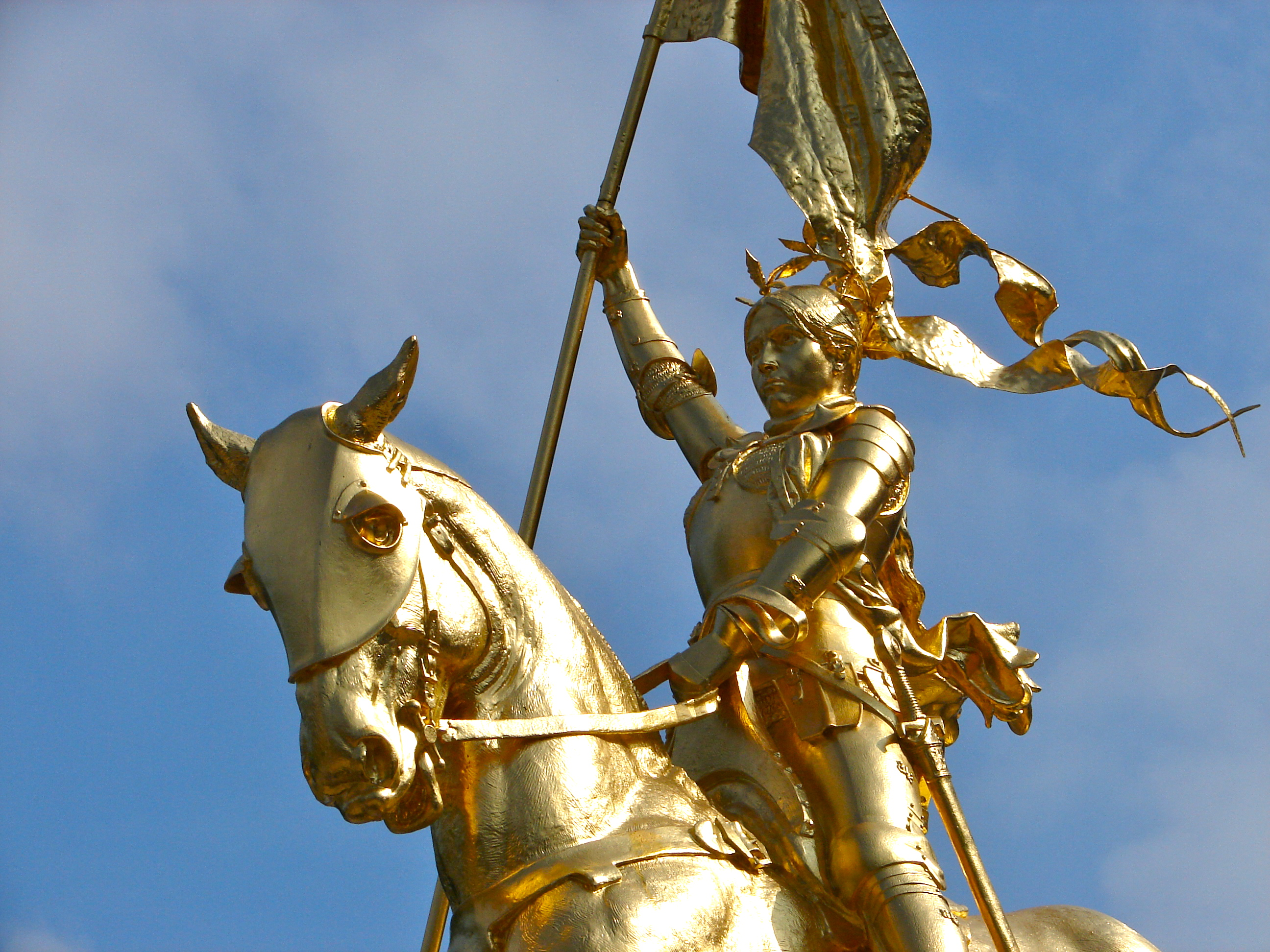
Philadelphia

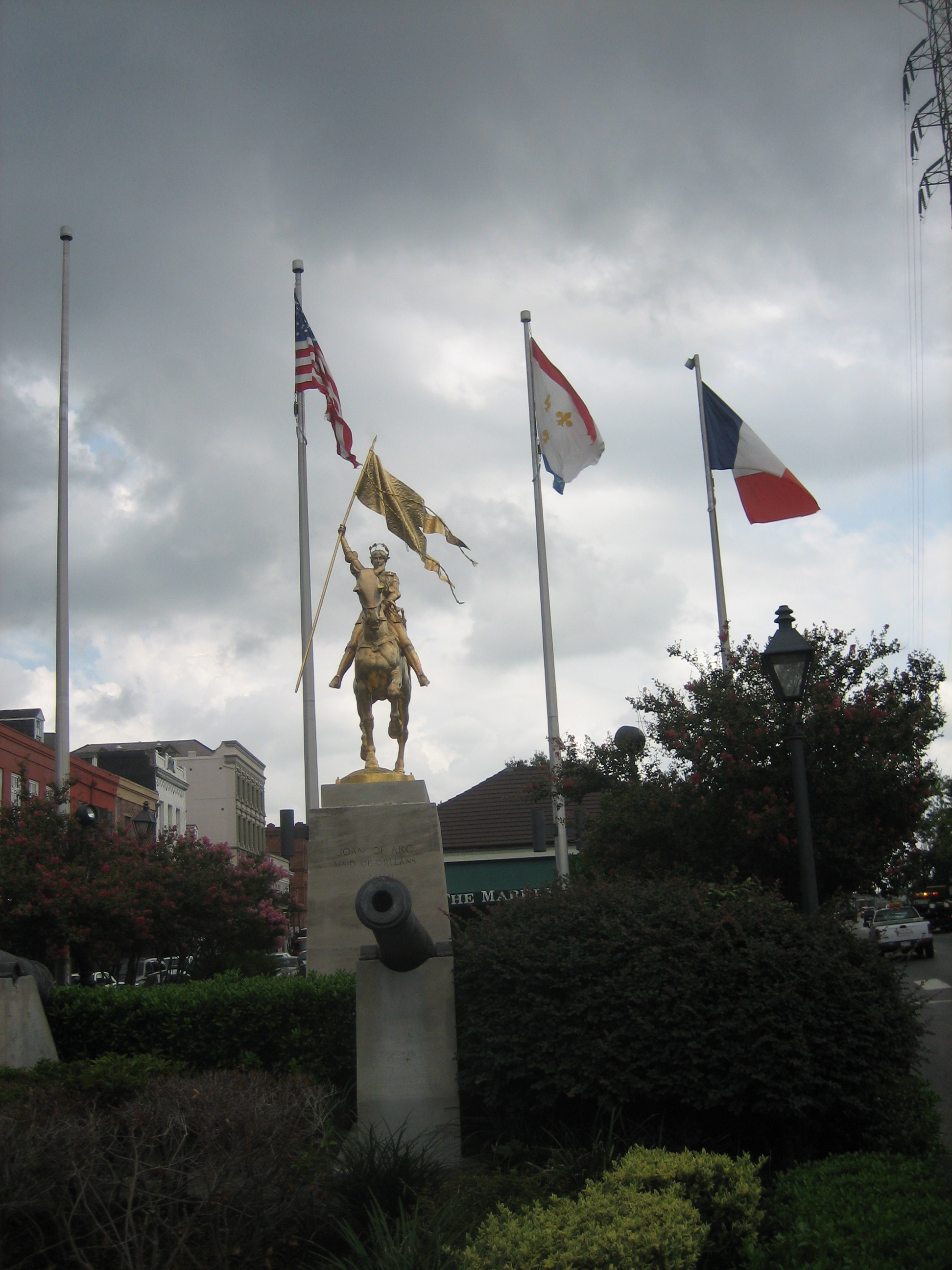
New Orleans

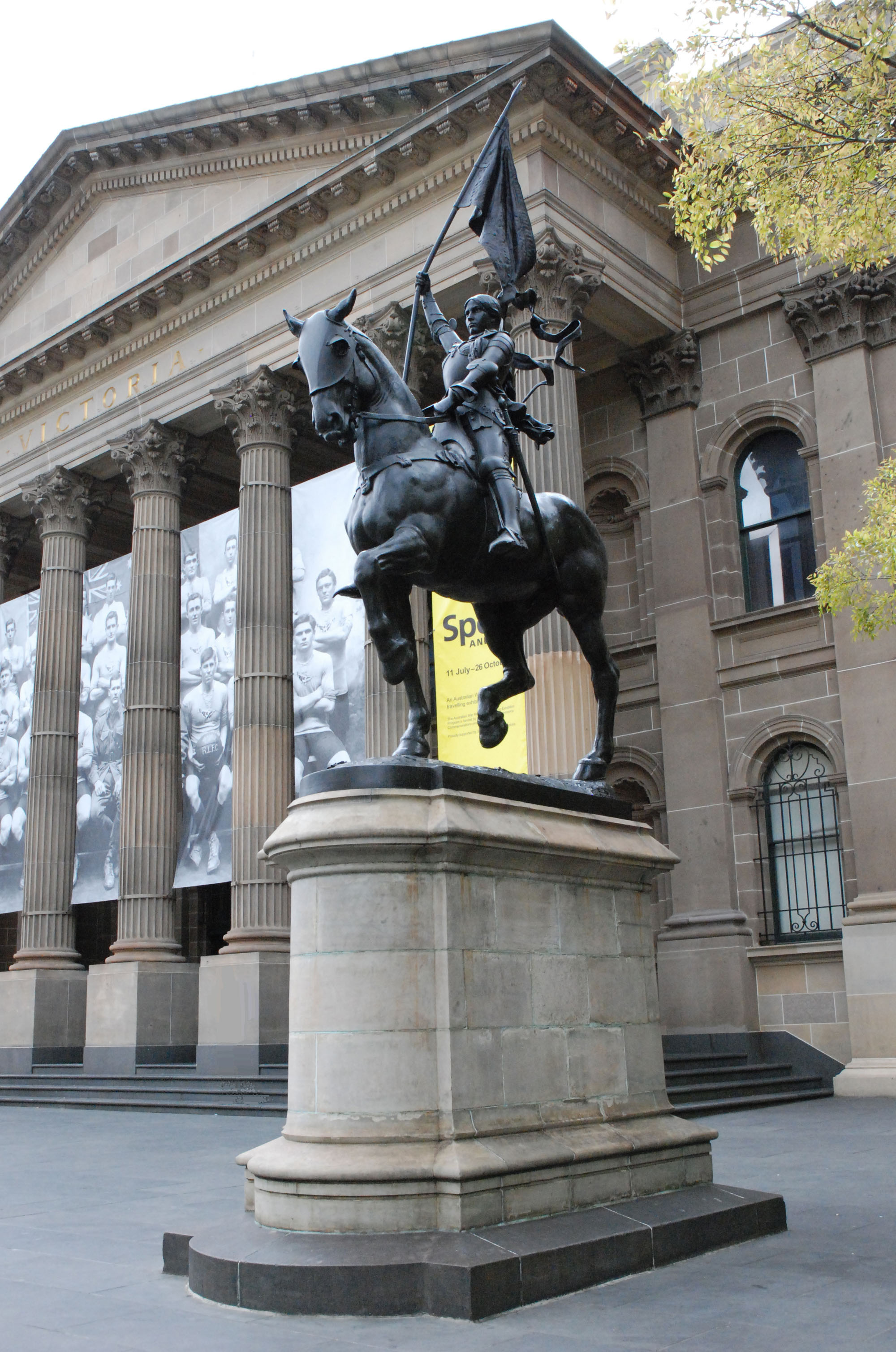
Melbourne

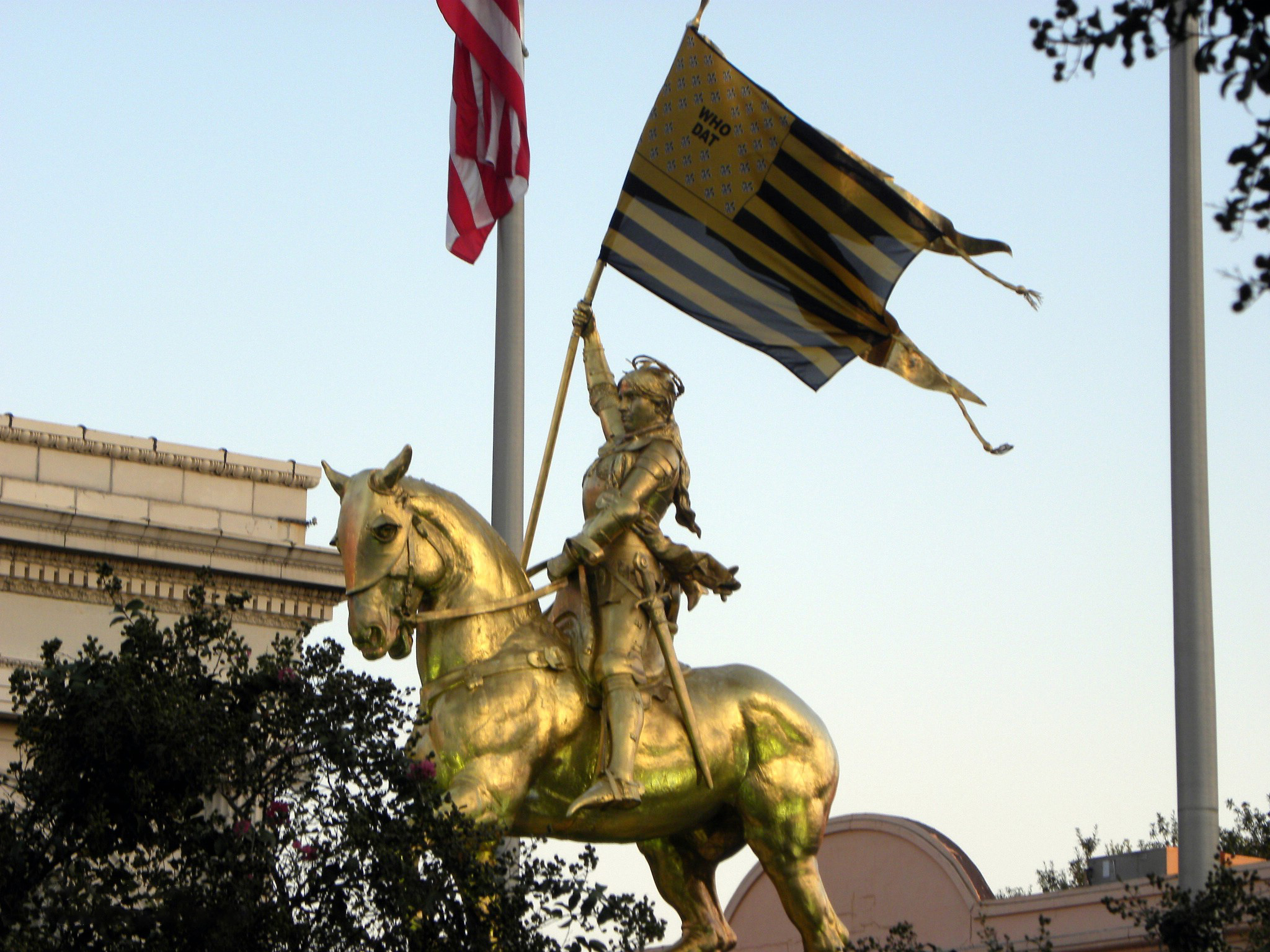
New Orleans

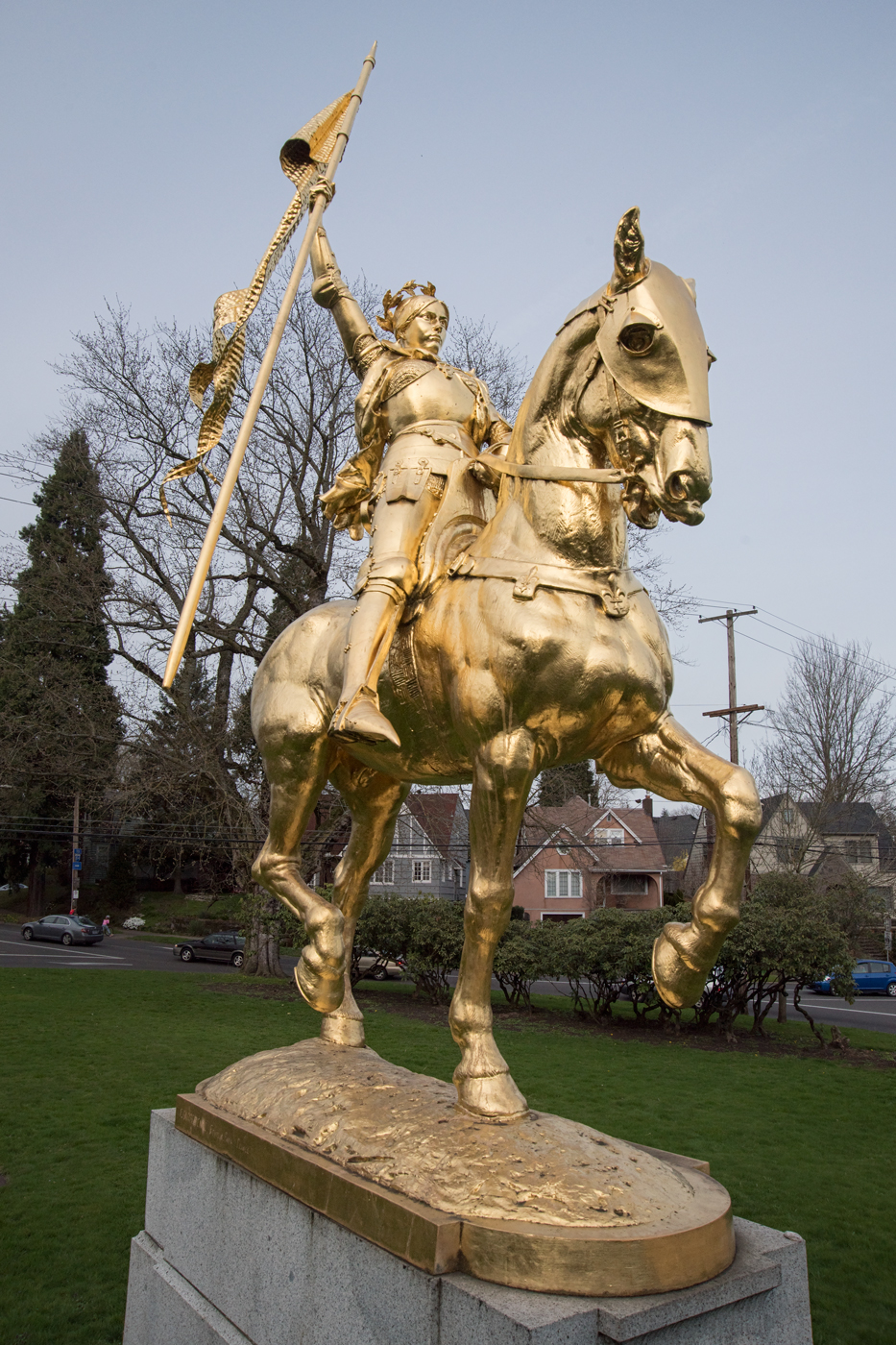
Portland

== See also ==
- List of public art in Philadelphia
- Joan of Arc (Dubois)
