= Alexander Turgenev =

Russian statesman and historian (1784–1845)

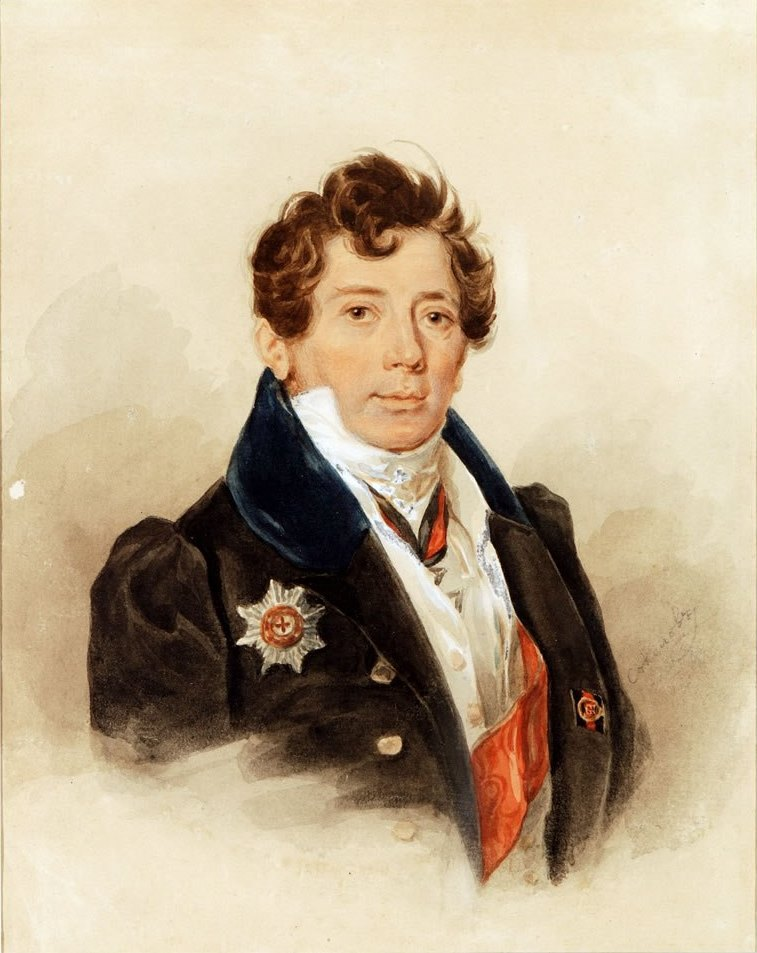
- Born: 7 April 1784; Simbirsk, Russia
- Died: 15 December 1845 (aged 61); Moscow, Russia
- Relatives: Nikolay Turgenev

Alexander Ivanovich Turgenev (Russian: Алекса́ндр Ива́нович Турге́нев; (27 March [7 April] 1784, Simbirsk - 3 [15] December 1845, Moscow) was a Russian statesman and historian.

== Biography ==
Alexander Turgenev was born in Simbirsk in 1784. His father, Ivan Petrovich Turgenev (1752-1807) was one of the most enlightened men of his time. Alexander was educated at Moscow University, where he met the poet Vasily Zhukovsky; they formed a friendship that lasted until the death of Turgenev. From 1802 to 1804 he studied history and political science at the University of Göttingen, and then traveled with his friend Andrey Kaisarov.

He served in the Ministry of Justice, took part in the work of the commission to formulate laws, and accompanied the Tsar, Alexander I, abroad in 1810. Afterwards he was appointed Director of the Department of the General Directorate of Religious Affairs of Foreign Faiths; at the same time he was made an assistant secretary of the State Council and a senior member of the committee drafting the law. When the Ministry of Religious Affairs and National Education was formed in 1817, Turgenev headed the Department of Religious Affairs.

In 1824 Prince A. N. Golitsyn was dismissed from the post of Minister of Religious Affairs and National Education and the Ministry itself was transformed. The Department of Religious Affairs was reorganized; Turgenev was dismissed from his management position and replaced by a member of the legislative commission. After this, he was often abroad, where he examined archives and libraries, collecting information on the ancient and modern history of Russia. The materials thus collected were made available to the Archaeological Commission by order of Tsar Nicholas I, and published in 1841 and 1842 under the Latin title Historiae Russiae Monumenta ex antiquis exterarum gentium archivis et bibliothecis deprompta ab A. I. Turgenevio.

The first volume was an extract from the Vatican archives of the 11th century, while the second volume included statements of the Pope and the reports of papal representatives of Russia from 1584 to 1718, historical facts regarding Russia extracted from archives and libraries in England and France from 1557 to 1671, and facts collected by А. B. Albertrandi for the Polish historian A. S. Narushevich. In addition, Turgenev made extracts, mostly from the Paris archives, concerning the era of Peter the Great.

Turgenev was close to many representatives of science and literature, both Russian and foreign, and Ivan Dmitriev and Prince Pyotr Vyazemsky were among his friends. Turgenev played a part in the works and the lives of Konstantin Batyushkov, Alexander Pushkin, Ivan Kozlov, and Yevgeny Baratynsky. It was Turgenev who took the body of Pushkin from Saint Petersburg to the family vault at the Svyatogorsk Monastery.

All his life he never stopped learning, and his letters were, according to I. N. Sreznevsky, "one of the treasures of our literature, with the diversity and richness of the historical information, vivid and true, and all the thoughts and feelings expressed in them."

=== Honours ===
In 1814 the botanist Georg Franz Hoffmann published Turgenia, which is a genus of flowering plants in the family Apiaceae, named in his honour. Then in 1844, the botanist Boissier published Turgeniopsis is a monotypic genus of flowering plants (from Bulgaria and western asia) but also belonging to the family Apiaceae. It was likewise named in Alexander Turgenev's honor.
