= Laurelhurst Park =

Public park in Portland, Oregon, U.S.

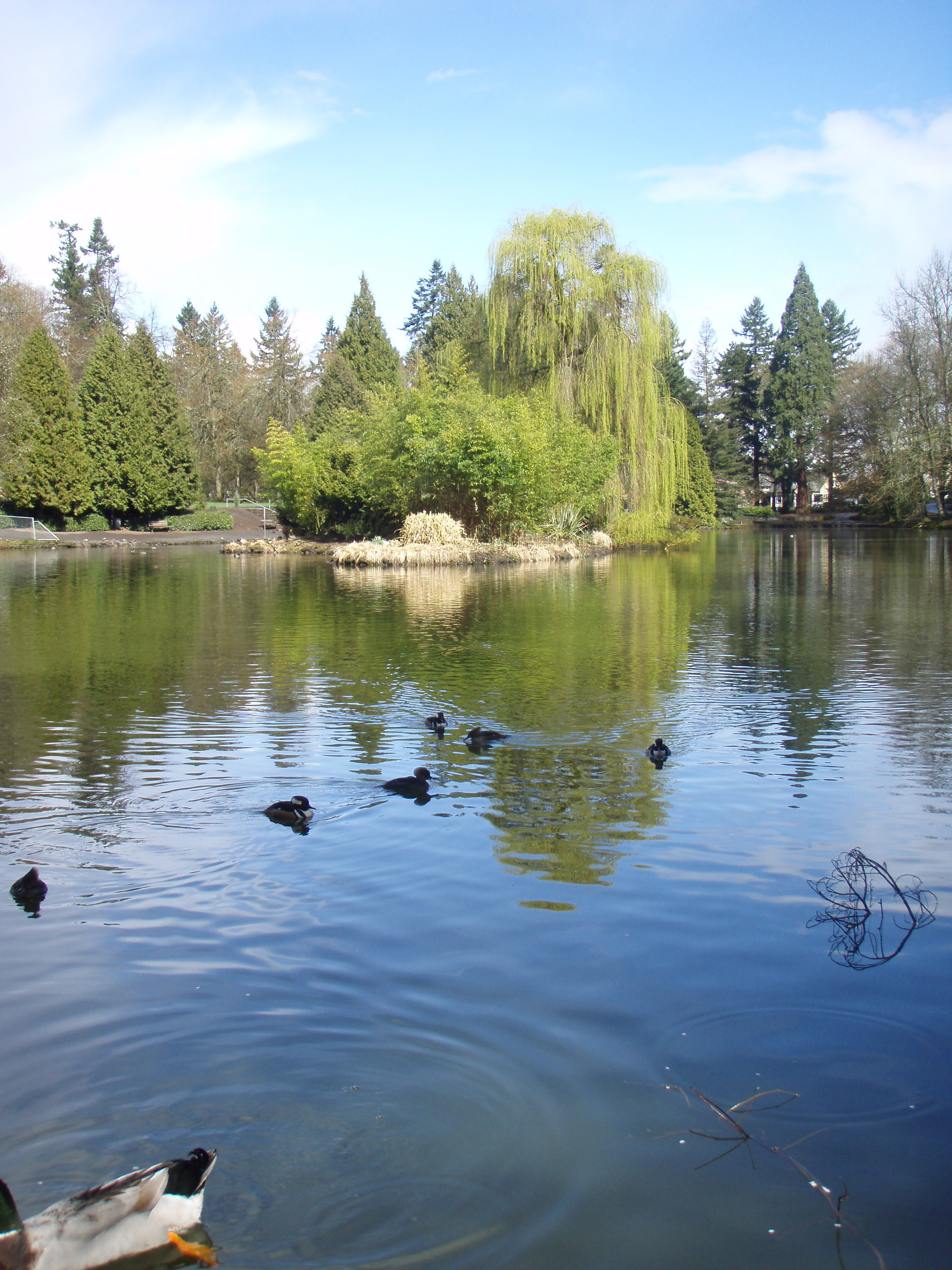
- Firwood Lake at Laurelhurst Park in March 2008
- Interactive map of Laurelhurst Park
- Type: Urban park
- Location: SE César E. Chávez Blvd. and Stark St. Portland, Oregon
- Coordinates: 45°31′17″N 122°37′35″W
- Area: 32.27 acres (13.06 ha)
- Created: 1909
- Operator: Portland Parks & Recreation
- Status: Open 5 a.m. to 10:30 p.m. daily
- Laurelhurst Park
- U.S. National Register of Historic Places
- Portland Historic Landmark
- Built: 1909
- MPS: City Beautiful Movement and Civic Planning in Portland, Oregon MPS
- NRHP reference No.: 01000134
- Added to NRHP: February 16, 2001

Laurelhurst Park is a city park in the neighborhood of Laurelhurst in Portland, Oregon. The 26.81-acre (10.85 ha) park was acquired in 1909 from the estate of former Portland mayor William S. Ladd. The City of Portland purchased the land in 1911, and the following year park superintendent Emanuel Mische designed the park in accordance with the Olmsted Plan.

In 1919, the Pacific Coast Parks Association named Laurelhurst Park the "most beautiful park" on the West Coast, and in February 2001 it was the first city park ever to be listed on the National Register of Historic Places.

The park costs the city approximately $274,000 per year to maintain.

== History ==
In 1909, the land that would later become Laurelhurst Park was purchased from the estate of William S. Ladd, the former Portland mayor who developed Ladd's Addition. The tract of land, part of a larger parcel Ladd used to generate "one of the most prestigious stock farms in the West", later became too valuable for agricultural use. The City of Portland purchased the land in 1911 with the hope of establishing a park in accordance with the Olmsted Plan. Emanuel Mische, Portland's park superintendent from 1908 to 1914, designed the park in 1912 with experience he acquired as a longtime horticultural "expert" for the Olmsted Brothers landscape design firm. Mische was guided by the firm's natural approach to landscaping and created seven distinct areas: the concert grove, Firwood Lake, children's lawn, plateau and broad meadows, picnic grove, and Rhododendron Hill. A spring-fed pond once used as a watering hole for cattle was deepened into a 3-acre (1.2 ha) lake. A "play park" was established between Oak and Stark Streets; here boys could play on the south side while girls played on the north side, and general games could be held on the east side. A comfort station building was built in 1914, and the following year a series of paths and sidewalks were lit by electric lights.

== Features ==
Laurelhurst Park includes a basketball court, soccer field, tennis court, volleyball court, playground, dog off-leash area, historical site, horseshoe pit, paved and unpaved paths, picnic site with tables, public art, stage, and restrooms.

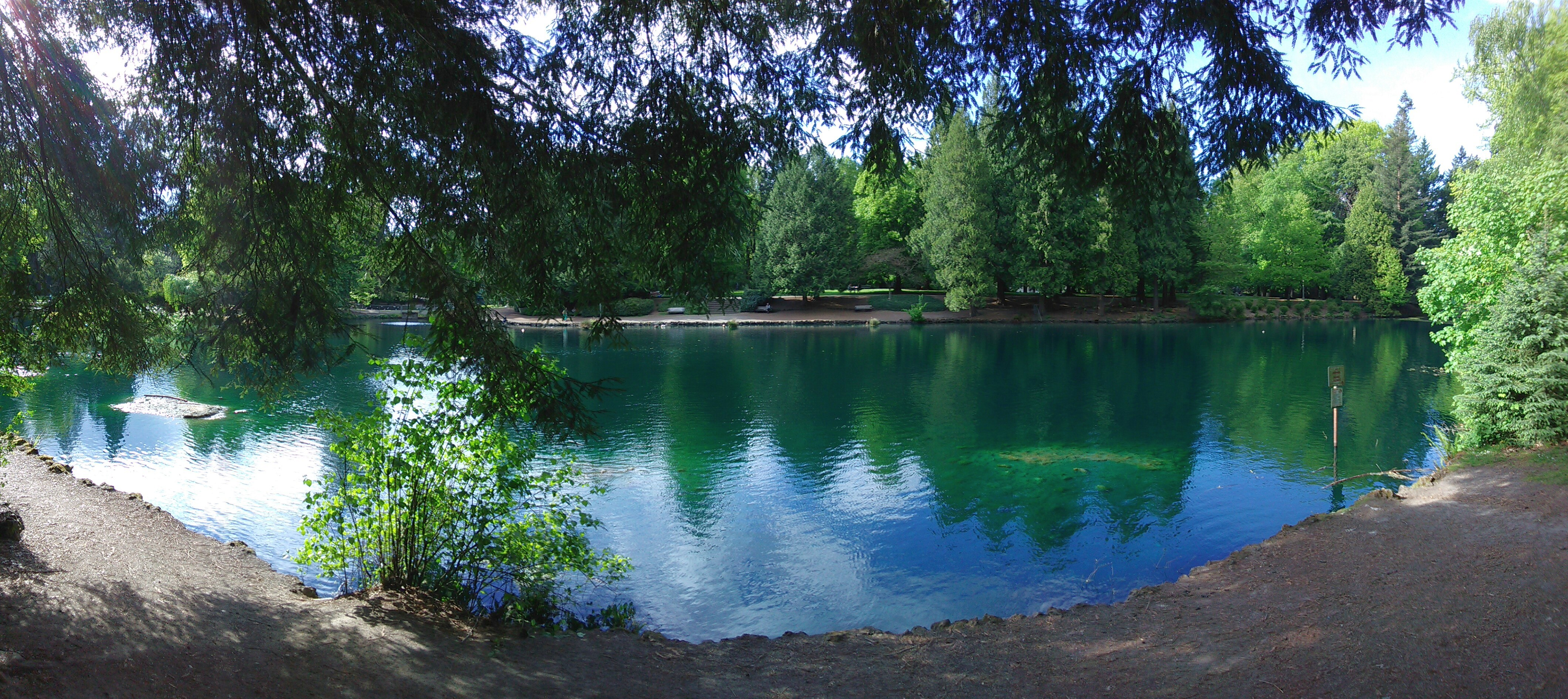
Firwood Lake in April 2021

== Events ==
The Portland Rose Festival Queen's Coronation used to take place in the park pond "on floating boats and decorated rafts", drawing thousands of visitors. Junction City residents often held their annual picnic at Laurelhurst during the 1930s; the park has hosted many other picnics and reunions over the years. Easter Sunrise Services were held at the park during the 1950s, also drawing thousands of people.

== Ecology ==
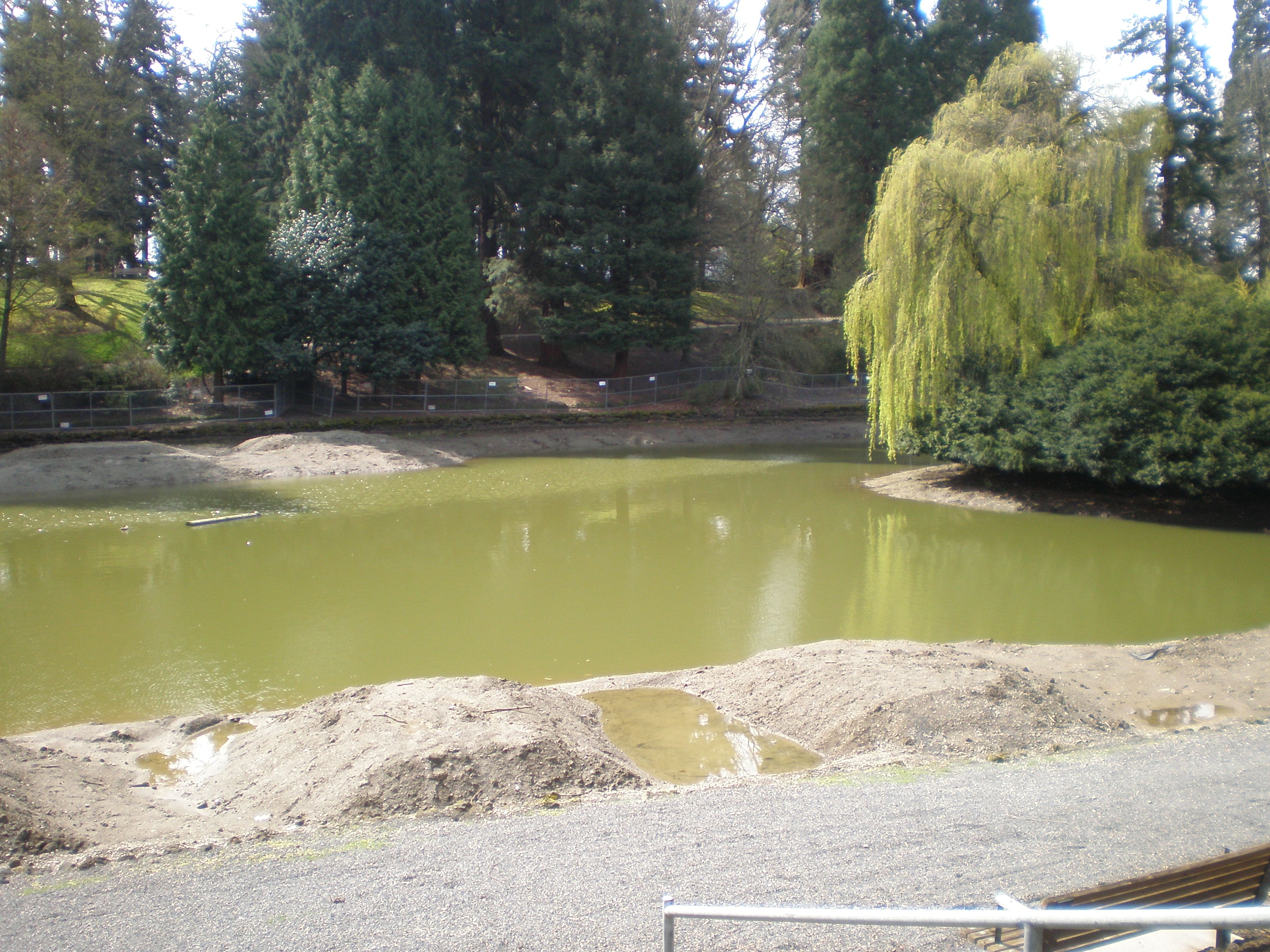
Firwood Lake restoration (April 2011)

According to Portland Parks & Recreation, the park's ideal duck population is 10 male/female pairs. In 1987, the normal duck population was 120, at times reaching more than 200, including migratory visitors. Murky water problems prompted Portland Parks & Recreation to attempt reducing the duck population, though an "adopt-a-duck" program was unsuccessful as the birds proved to be too difficult to catch.

In 1990, lake sediment was being stirred up by nearly 20,000 catfish, carp, and black crappie fish. This overcrowding also led to odor problems. The Oregon Bass and Panfish Club attempted to reduce the fish population without success. By 2008, the lake had become acutely eutrophic (lacking oxygen), and the sediment layer had reduced the lake depth from 13 to 15 feet (4.0 to 4.6 m) to only 18 inches (46 cm). Each year, large amounts of blue-green algae were produced as the sun quickly heated the shallow water. In response, Portland City Council allocated funds to dredge the lake and install a water aeration and circulation system.

== Reception ==
In 1919, the Pacific Coast Parks Association named Laurelhurst Park the "most beautiful park" on the West Coast, and in February 2001 it was the first city park ever to be listed on the National Register of Historic Places. The park was a finalist in the Best Park category of Willamette Week's annual 'Best of Portland' readers' poll in 2025.

== Crime ==
In February 2008 a woman's body was found partly submerged in the park's pond. In May 2009 a duck was killed after dozens of arrows were shot at waterfowl in Firwood Lake. In February 2010 a man was reportedly held at gunpoint in northeast Portland, forced to drive to Laurelhurst Park, then beaten and sexually assaulted.

== See also ==
- List of parks in Portland, Oregon
- National Register of Historic Places listings in Southeast Portland, Oregon
