= Alcoholate =

Originally, an alcoholate was the crystalline form of a salt in which alcohol took the place of water of crystallization, such as [SnCl_{3}(OC_{2}H_{5})·C_{2}H_{5}OH]_{2} and C_{8}H_{6}N_{4}O_{5}·CH_{3}OH. However this denomination should not be used anymore for the ending -ate often occurs in names for anions.

The second meaning of the word is that of a tincture, or alcoholic extract of plant material.

The third, and more usual meaning of the word is as a synonym for alkoxide— which is the conjugate base of an alcohol.
