= Pierre-Nicolas Tourgueneff =

French painter

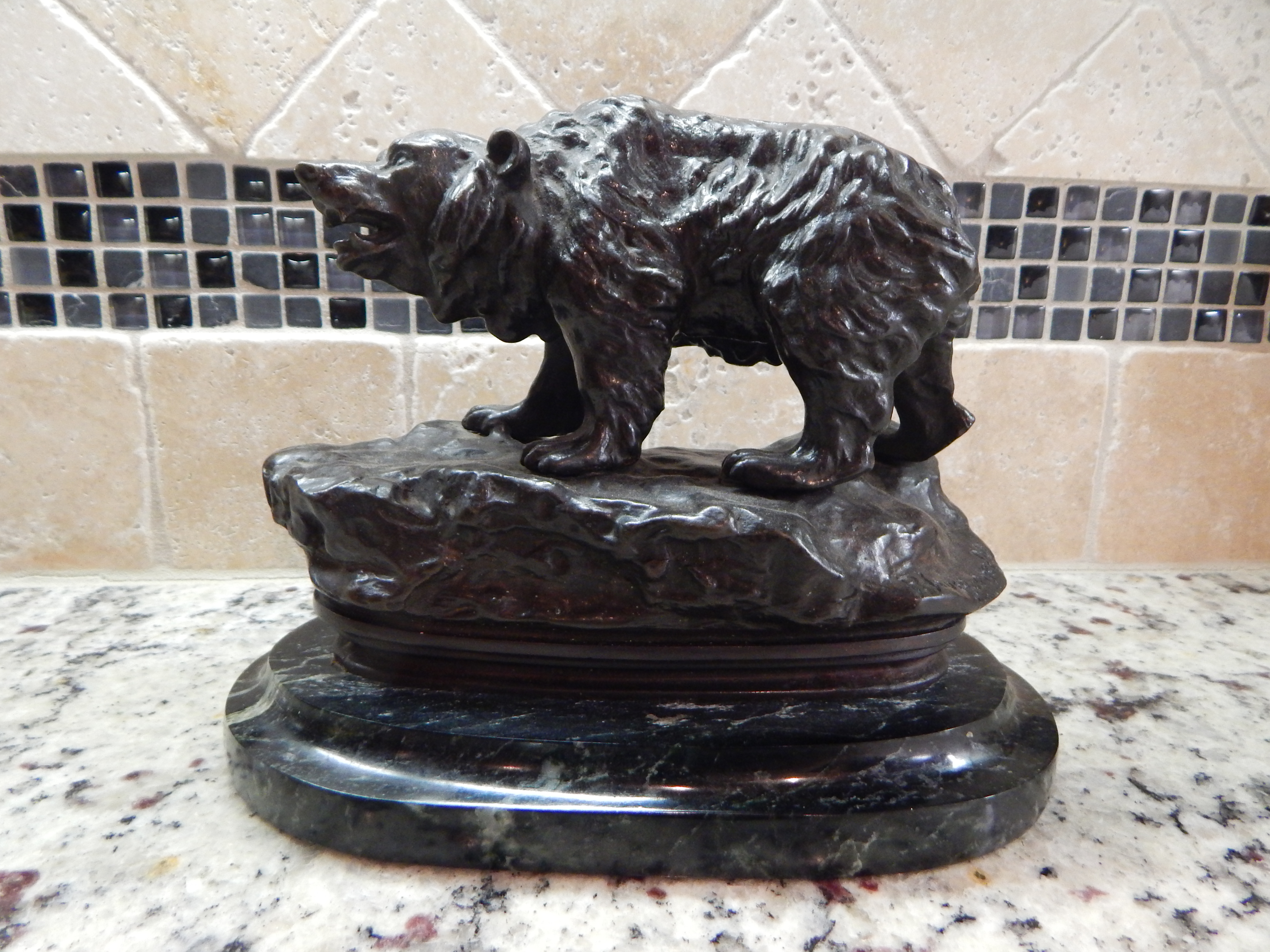
- An early 20th century bronze sculpture of a grizzly bear by Tourgueneff, c. 1902
- Born: 4 April 1853; Paris, France
- Died: 21 March 1912 (aged 58); Paris, France
- Education: Studied under Emmanuel Frémiet
- Known for: Sculpture
- Notable work: The Archer
- Movement: Animalier school Art Nouveau

Pierre-Nicolas Tourgueneff (4 April 1853 – 21 March 1912) was a French animalier sculptor and painter who worked in the late 19th century and early 20th century. He was a cousin of the writer Ivan Sergeyevich Turgenev. He began to exhibit his sculptures at the Salon in 1880 and continued to do so throughout his career.

== Early life ==
Tourgueneff was born into a family originally from Russia, the fourth child and second son of Nicolas Turgenev (1789–1871) and his wife Clara Viaris who was from Lesegno. His father, in his effort to avoid political and religious persecution in Russia, emigrated with his family to France. The elder Turgenev had been sentenced to death in absentia by Nicholas I for having participated in the Decembrist revolt. The original spelling of his surname was Turgenev but the spelling was changed to Tourgueneff at some point after the family moved to France.

Tourgueneff was a student of the famous French animalier sculptor Emmanuel Frémiet. Like his master, he could be categorized among the animalier sculptors because of his models of horses and dogs and his affiliation with Frémiet. Also attributed to him, however, are some equestrian figures of horses and riders, mostly portraying the military of Tourgueneff's own time or of the First Empire. He lived in a mansion inherited from his parents at 97 rue de Lille in Paris and also had his workshop in the Vert-Bois château, in the town of Rueil-Malmaison, where he stayed most often.

== Career ==
Many of his works were cast in bronze at the Susse Frères foundry in Paris. A number of these works, particularly some statuettes, were exhibited in bronze at the Salon where he started participating regularly in 1880. This is the case with 'Loys, comte de Nassau', an equestrian statue (1884), 'Veneur a cheval du XIVe siècle' (1885), 'Le Patron' (1886), 'Francarcher due XVe siècle' (1887), 'Etalon percheron' (1890), 'Gardeuse d'oies' (1891), 'Madame X. a cheval' (1893), 'Red Lancer' (1895), 'Cavalier de 1806' (1899), 'Le Vieux', equestrian group and 'Temeraire III, pur-sang' (1903), 'Pierre-le-Grand a cheval' (1906), 'Jument pouliniere pur-sang' (1907), 'Mademoiselle V. Nimidoff, de l'Opera' (1908) and 'Alexandre III de Russie,' an equestrian statue for the museum of St. Petersburg (1910).

Of further note among many other similar subjects are plasters including 'Visapour, etalon russe,' 20 x 90 cm (1880), 'Yermak, conquate de la Siberie en 1583', an equestrian statue (1884), 'Pasteur dans la steppe,' an equestrian statue (1886), 'Halage' (1887), 'Fille d'Eve' (1888), 'En grand'garde' (1890), 'La Charge' (1892), 'Chevaux de labour' (1896), 'Grenadier de la garde consulaire' and 'Chasseur d'Afrique,' two equestrian statuettes (1901), 'Dans la praire, jument pur-sang' (1905) and 'Diane chasseresee a cheval' (1910).

== Death and legacy ==
Tourgueneff died on 21 March 1912 in Paris, France. He is remembered as an important French animalier sculptor. During his lifetime he received the visit of writers, artists, painters and designers such as Jean-Louis Forain, Roger Joseph Jourdain, Ernest Ange Duez and the journalist Gaul Miguel Zamacoïs.

Tourgueneff was appointed Knight of the Legion of Honour.

== Public exhibitions ==
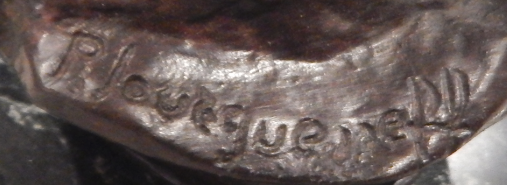
A circa 1902 signature example for Tourgueneff

In France

- Nîmes, jardins de la Fontaine: Charles Jalabert, 1904, buste en bronze
- Musée des beaux-arts de Nîmes: Charles Jalabert, 1904, buste en bronze
- Paris, Musée de l'Armée (Paris)
- Paris, Musée d'Orsay: Chevaux de Halage, 1903, bronze. Le plâtre a été exposé au Salon des artistes français de 1887

In Russia

- Saint Petersburg, Palais de Marbre : Alexander III of Russia, 1910, statue équestre en bronze

== Works ==
The Susse Frères foundry, at the beginning of the 20th century, published a catalog listing 23 works, as follows:

- Archer, 73 cm. and 37 cm.
- Chasseur en vedette, 38 cm.
- Cheval Cob, 23 cm.
- Cheval demi-sang, 48 cm.
- Cheval au dressage, 31 cm.
- Cheval Norfolk, 32 cm.
- Cheval de selle, 31 cm.
- Chien barbet assis (Scottish Terrier), 16 cm.
- Chiens bassets, group, 12 cm.
- Chien a l'escargot, 6 cm.
- Chien griffon basset (a la piste), 11 cm.
- Chien de police, 19 cm. and 10 cm.
- Tete de chien, 23 cm. and 6 cm.
- Tete de chien, seal, 7 cm.
- Cuitrassier a la charge, 46 cm., 19 cm. and 12 cm.
- Dragon en vedette, 40 cm.
- Grenadier de la garde, 62 cm.
- Hussard 1806, 61 cm.
- Jument Theresa, 17 cm.
- Groupe de deux juments, 41 cm.
- Pouliniere, 28 cm.
- Retour de labour, 50 cm.
