= Place des Pyramides =

Square in Paris, France

Coordinates: 48°51′49.95″N 2°19′55.69″E

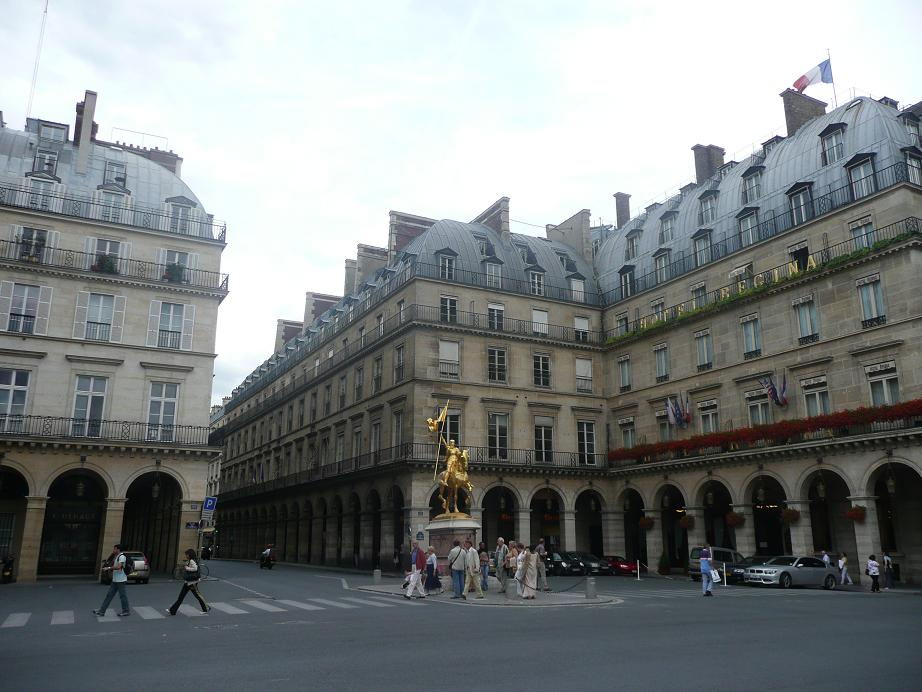
Place des Pyramides and its Jeanne d'Arc statue

The Place des Pyramides is a public square in the 1st arrondissement of Paris. It is located in the middle of the Rue de Rivoli, at its intersection with the Rue des Pyramides and the Avenue du General Lemonnier, at the eastern end of the Tuileries Garden.

The square was named for the Rue des Pyramides, the street leading into it, itself named for the Battle of the Pyramids, a Napoleonic victory achieved in Egypt in 1798.

== Description ==
A riding academy under Antoine de Pluvinel, squire to Henry III, Henry IV, and Louis XIII, was set up in this area in the 16th century. Known as "Le Pluvinel", this was the forerunner of the classical equestrian school, and it is commemorated by a plaque above the entrance to the Hôtel Regina restaurant.

The gilded bronze equestrian statue of Joan of Arc on this square was produced by Emmanuel Frémiet in 1874.

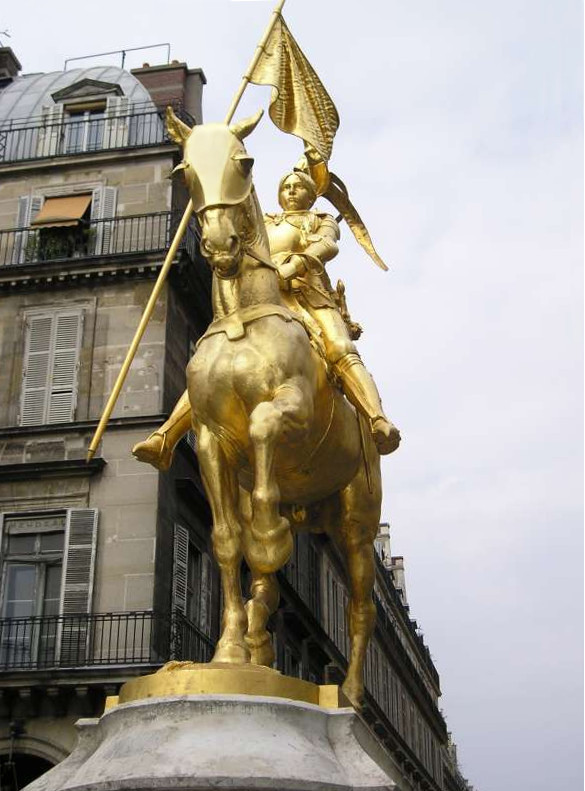
Joan of Arc statue on the Place des Pyramides

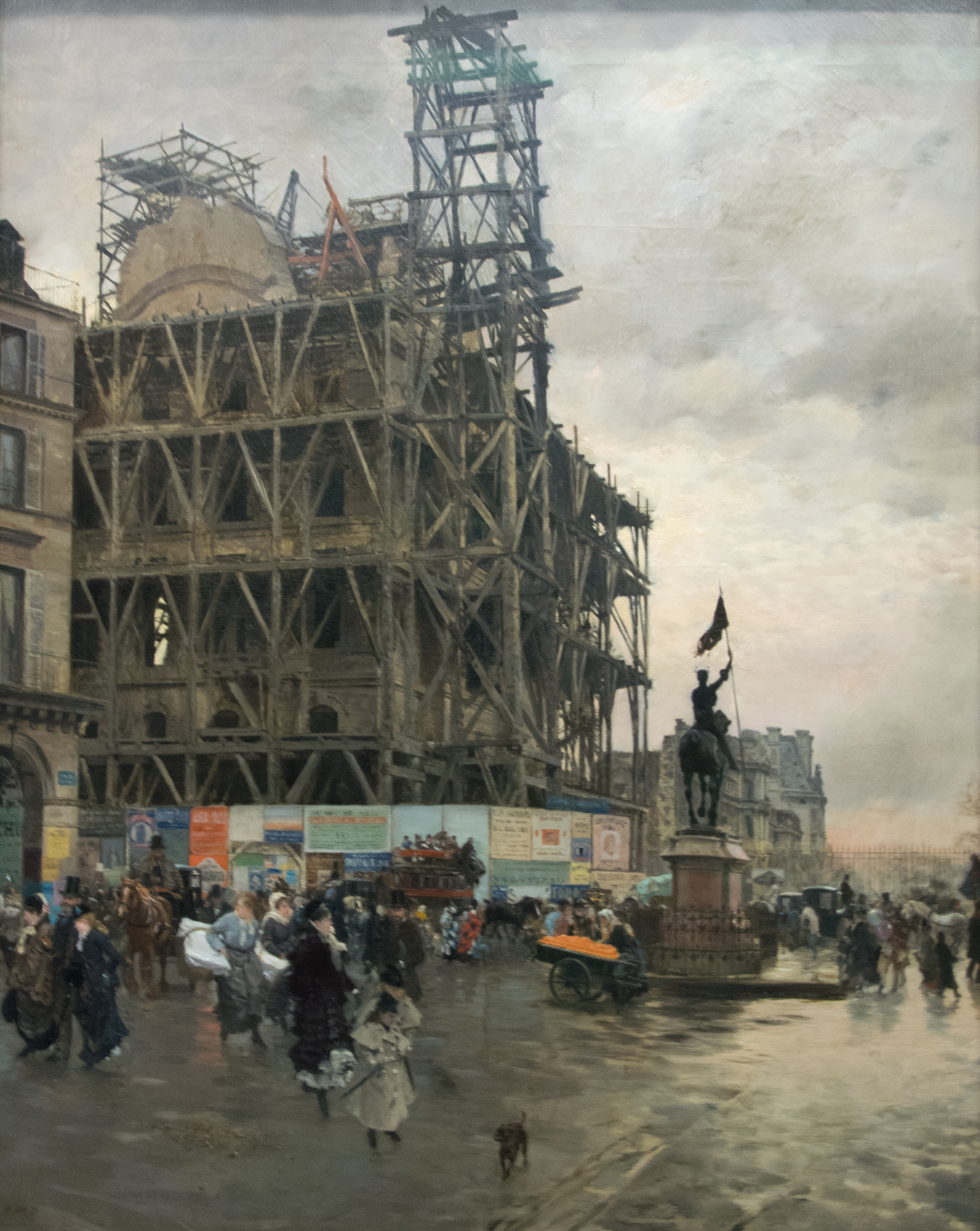
Giuseppe De Nittis, La Place des Pyramides, Paris, 1875
