= Emmanuel Frémiet =

19th/20th-century French sculptor

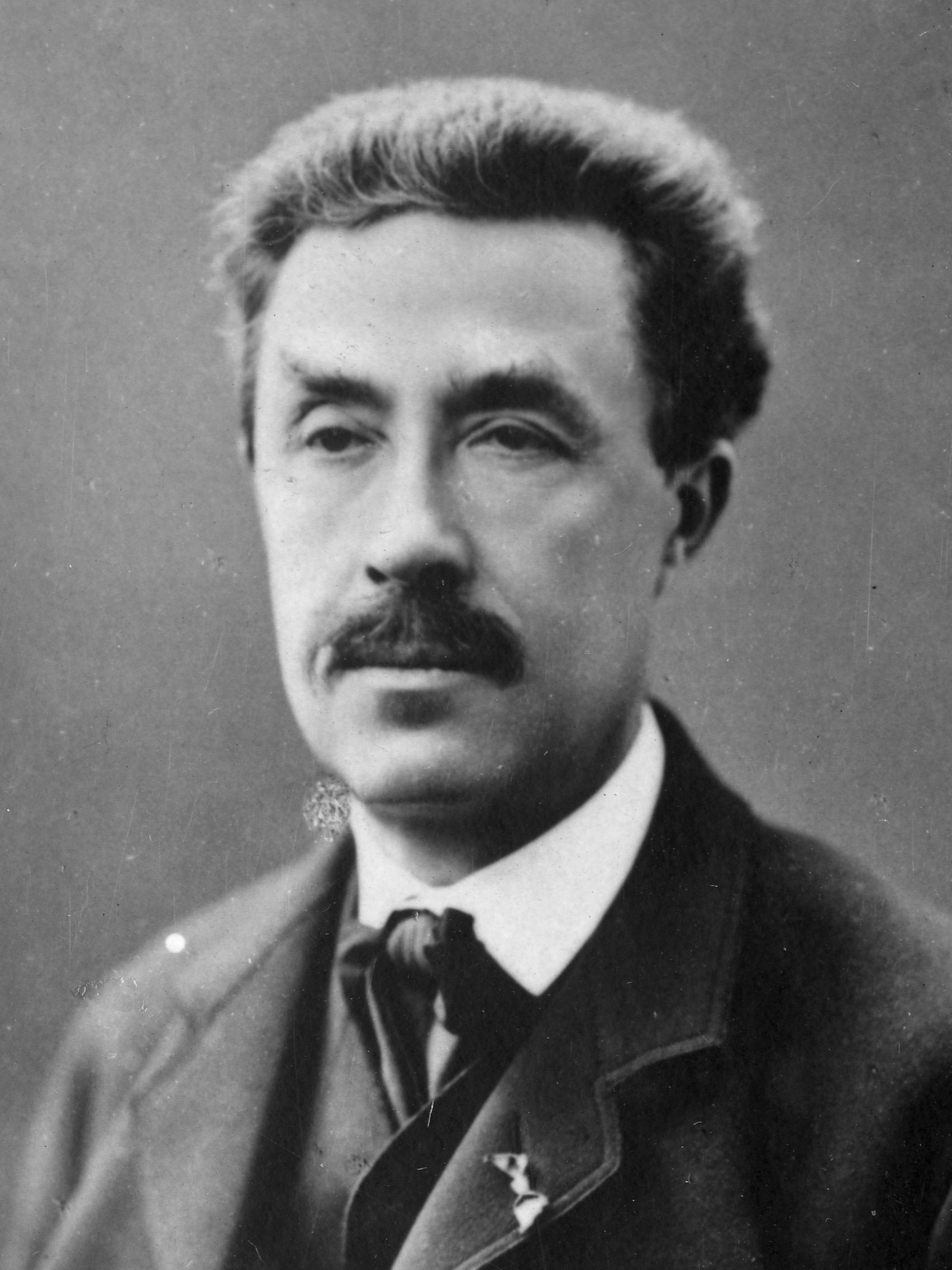
- Born: 6 December 1824; Paris, France
- Died: 10 September 1910 (aged 85); Paris, France
- Known for: Sculpture
- Movement: Animalier

Emmanuel Frémiet (6 December 1824 – 10 September 1910) was a French sculptor. He is famous for his 1874 sculpture of Joan of Arc in Paris (and its "sister" statues in Philadelphia and Portland, Oregon) and the monument to Ferdinand de Lesseps in Suez. The noted sculptor Pierre-Nicolas Tourgueneff was one of many students who learned sculpture under the tutelage of Frémiet.

== Early life ==
Born in Paris, he was a nephew and pupil of Sophie Frémiet, and later he became a pupil of her husband François Rude. He chiefly devoted himself to animal sculpture. His earliest work was in scientific lithography (osteology), and for a while he served in times of adversity in the gruesome office of painter to the morgue. In 1843 he sent to the Salon a study of a Gazelle, and after that date worked prolifically. His Wounded Bear and Wounded Dog were produced in 1850, and the Luxembourg Museum at once secured this striking example of his work.

== Career ==
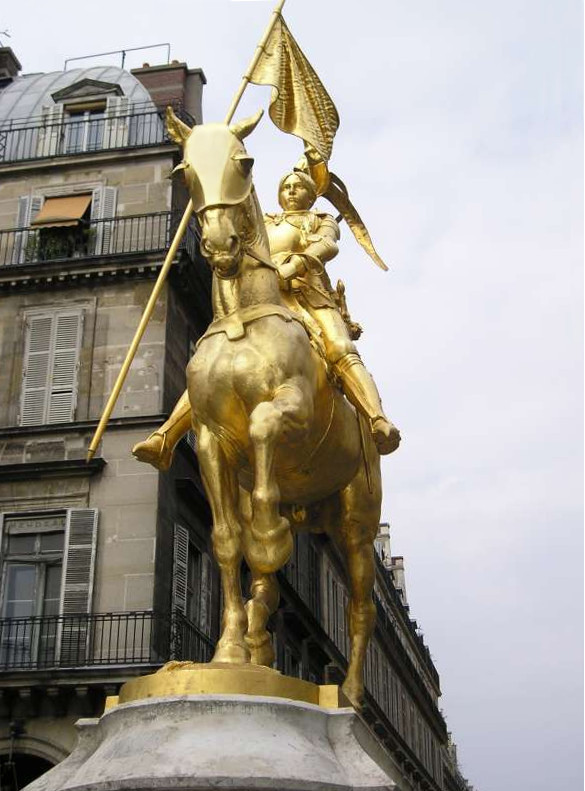
Frémiet's Jeanne d'Arc, Paris

In the 1850s, Frémiet produced various Napoleonic works. He first exhibited in the Paris Salon at the age of nineteen with a sculpture of an Algerian gazelle. In 1853, Frémiet, "the leading sculptor of animals in his day" exhibited bronze sculptures of Emperor Napoleon III's Basset Hounds at the Paris Salon. Soon afterwards, from 1855 to 1859 Frémiet was engaged on a series of military statuettes for Napoleon III, none of which have survived.

He produced his equestrian statue of Napoleon I in 1868, and of Louis d'Orleans of 1869 (at the Château de Pierrefonds) and in 1874 the first equestrian statue of Joan of Arc, erected in the Place des Pyramides, Paris; this he afterwards (1889) replaced with another version. During this period he also executed Pan and the Bear Cubs, also acquired by the Luxembourg Museum and now in the Musée d'Orsay.

In 1887 he exhibited his Gorilla Carrying off a Woman which won him a medal of honour at the Salon. It depicts a large primate with a spear wound in his shoulder, carrying a still-alive female victim and a stone weapon. This sculpture divided critics at the time but is now recognised as one of his most significant works.

Of the same character is his Ourang-Outangs and Borneo Savage of 1895, a commission from the Paris Museum of Natural History. Frémiet also executed the statue of St Michael for the summit of the spire of the Eglise St Michel, and the equestrian statue of Velasquez for the Jardin de l'Infante at the Louvre. Named an Officer of the French Legion of Honor in 1878, he became a member of the Académie des Beaux-Arts in 1892, and succeeded Antoine-Louis Barye as professor of animal drawing at the Natural History Museum of Paris.

Frémiet died on 10 September 1910 in Paris and was buried in the Cimetière de Louveciennes.

== Sculpture gallery ==
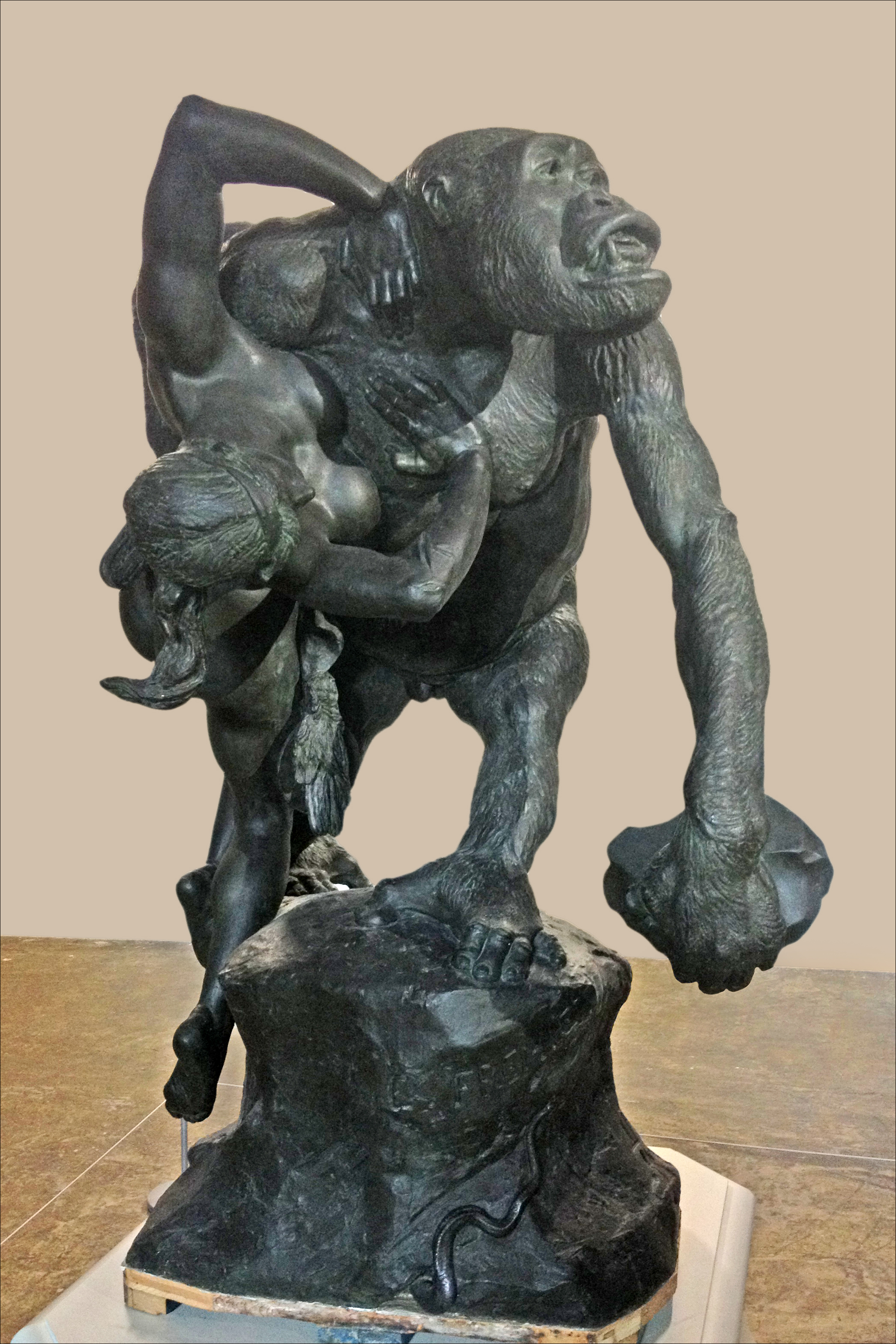
Gorille enlevant une Femme

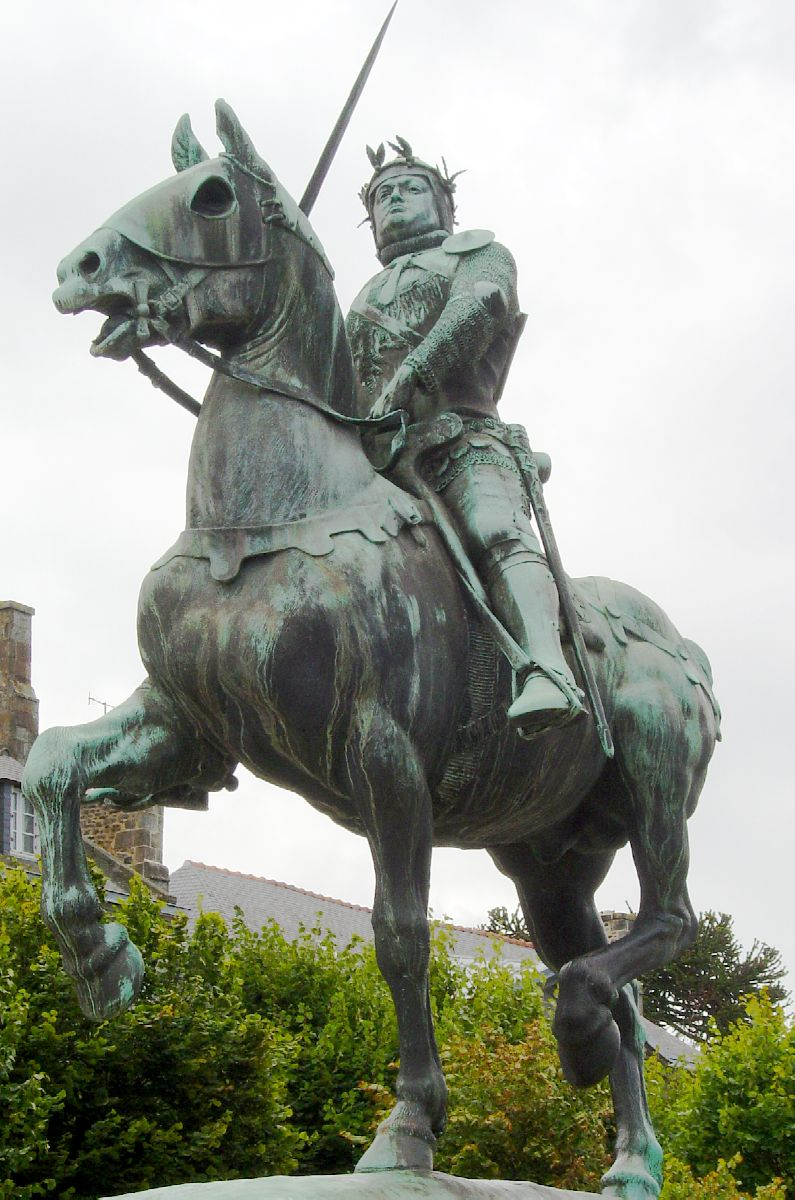
Bertrand du Guesclin in Dinan

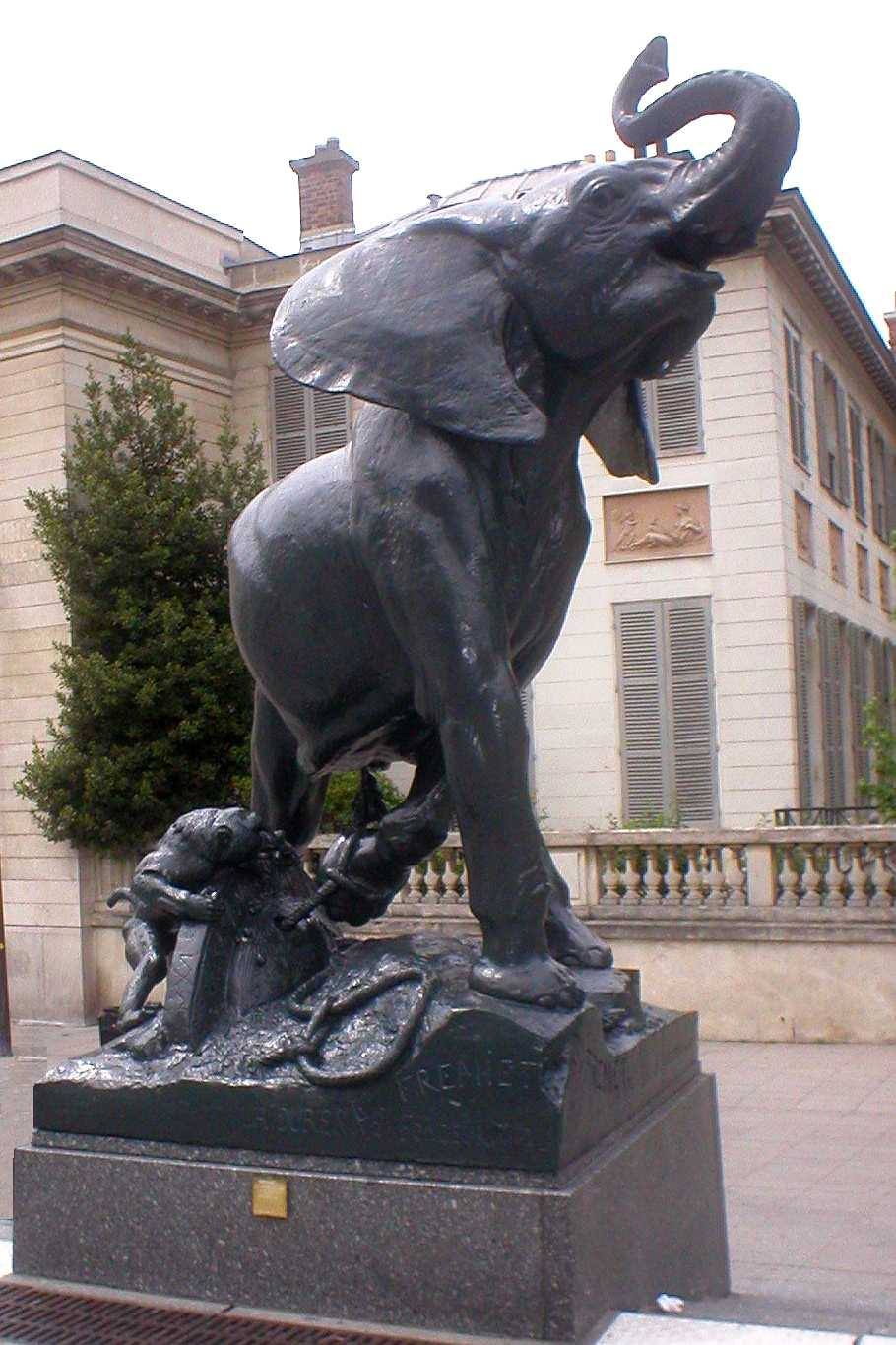
Jeune éléphant pris au piège outside the
Musée d'Orsay, Paris

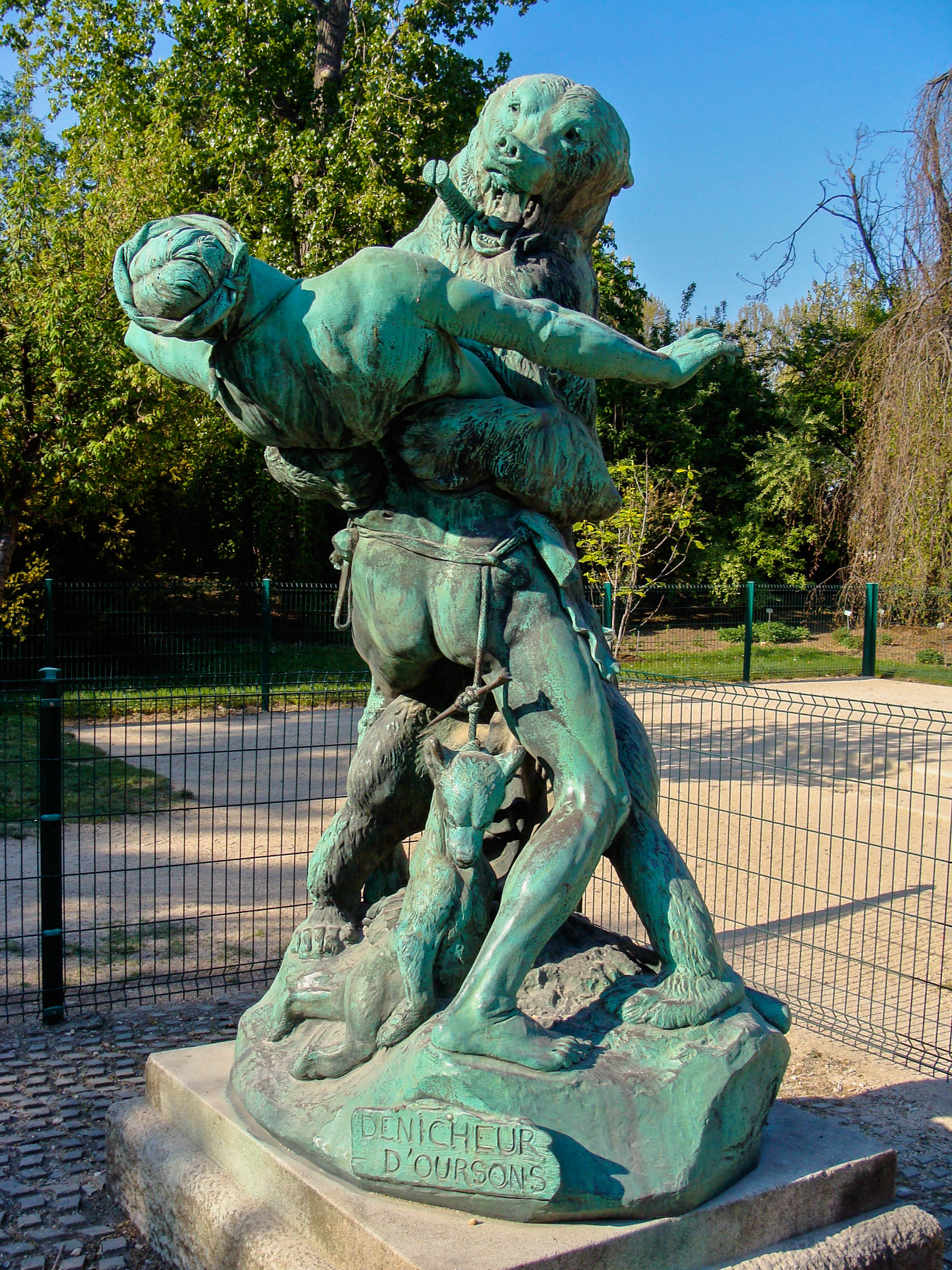
Le Dénicheur d'oursons, Jardin des Plantes, Paris
