= Nikolay Turgenev =

Russian economist

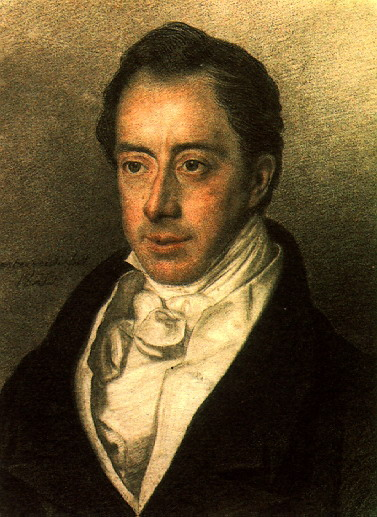

Nikolay Ivanovich Turgenev (Russian: Николай Иванович Тургенев), (23 October, 1789, Simbirsk–10 November 1871, Bougival near Paris) was an early Russian economist and political theoretician who gained renown for his Essay on the Theory of Taxation (1818) and Russia and the Russians (1847). A relative of the novelist Ivan Turgenev, Nikolay co-founded several reformist societies, notably the Northern Society of the Decembrists. Being abroad during the fateful Rebellion of 1825, he chose never to return to his homeland, where he was tried in absentia and sentenced to Siberian katorga for life.

== See also ==
- Pyotr Chaadaev
- Alexander Herzen
