= Laurelhurst, Portland, Oregon =

Neighborhood in Portland, Oregon, U.S.

Laurelhurst
- Neighborhood
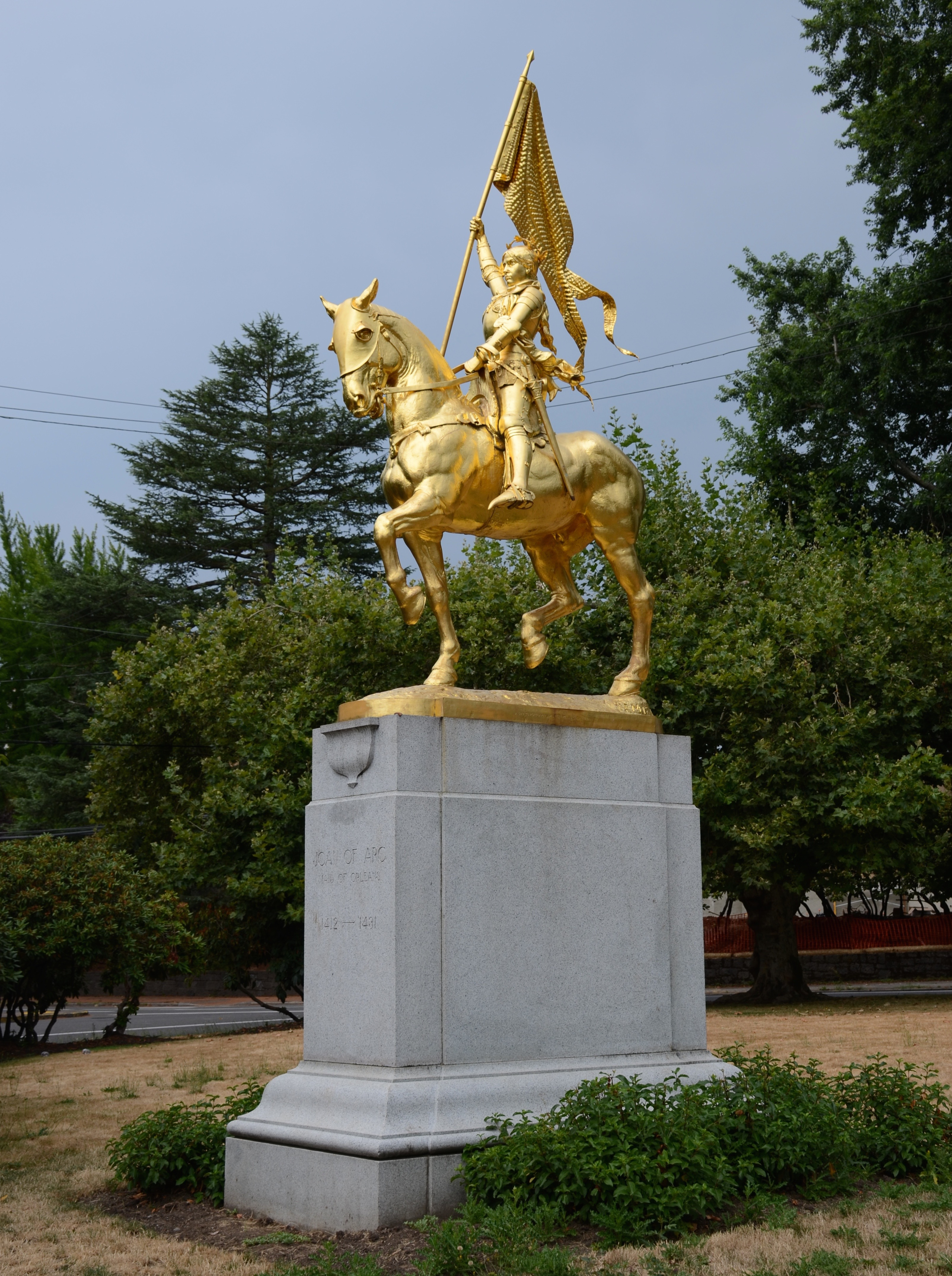
- The equestrian statue of Joan of Arc in Coe Circle, Laurelhurst
- Interactive map of Laurelhurst
- Coordinates: 45°31′38″N 122°37′23″W
- Country: United States
- State: Oregon
- City: Portland

Government
  - Association: Laurelhurst Neighborhood Association
  - Coalition: Southeast Uplift

Area
  - Total: 0.67 sq mi (1.73 km^{2})

Population (2000)
  - Total: 4,549
  - Density: 6,810/sq mi (2,630/km^{2})

Housing
  - No. of households: 1,765
  - Occupancy rate: 97% occupied
  - Owner-occupied: 1,615 households (92%)
  - Renting: 150 households (8%)
  - Avg. household size: 2.58 persons
- ISO 3166 code
- Laurelhurst Historic District
- U.S. National Register of Historic Places
- Location: Roughly bounded by NE Stark, NE Senate, NE 44th and NE 32nd, Portland, Oregon
- Area: 392 acres (159 ha)
- MPS: Historic Residential Suburbs in the United States, 1830–1960 MPS
- NRHP reference No.: 100003462
- Added to NRHP: March 18, 2019

Laurelhurst is a neighborhood of vintage single-family homes and undulating streets surrounding a park of the same name, straddling the NE and SE sections of Portland. Stone markers flank the entrances to the area. The center of the neighborhood, Coe Circle, contains a gilded equestrian statue of Joan of Arc, which is a World War I war memorial. The Laurelhurst Historic District was officially listed on the National Register of Historic Places in 2019.

== History ==
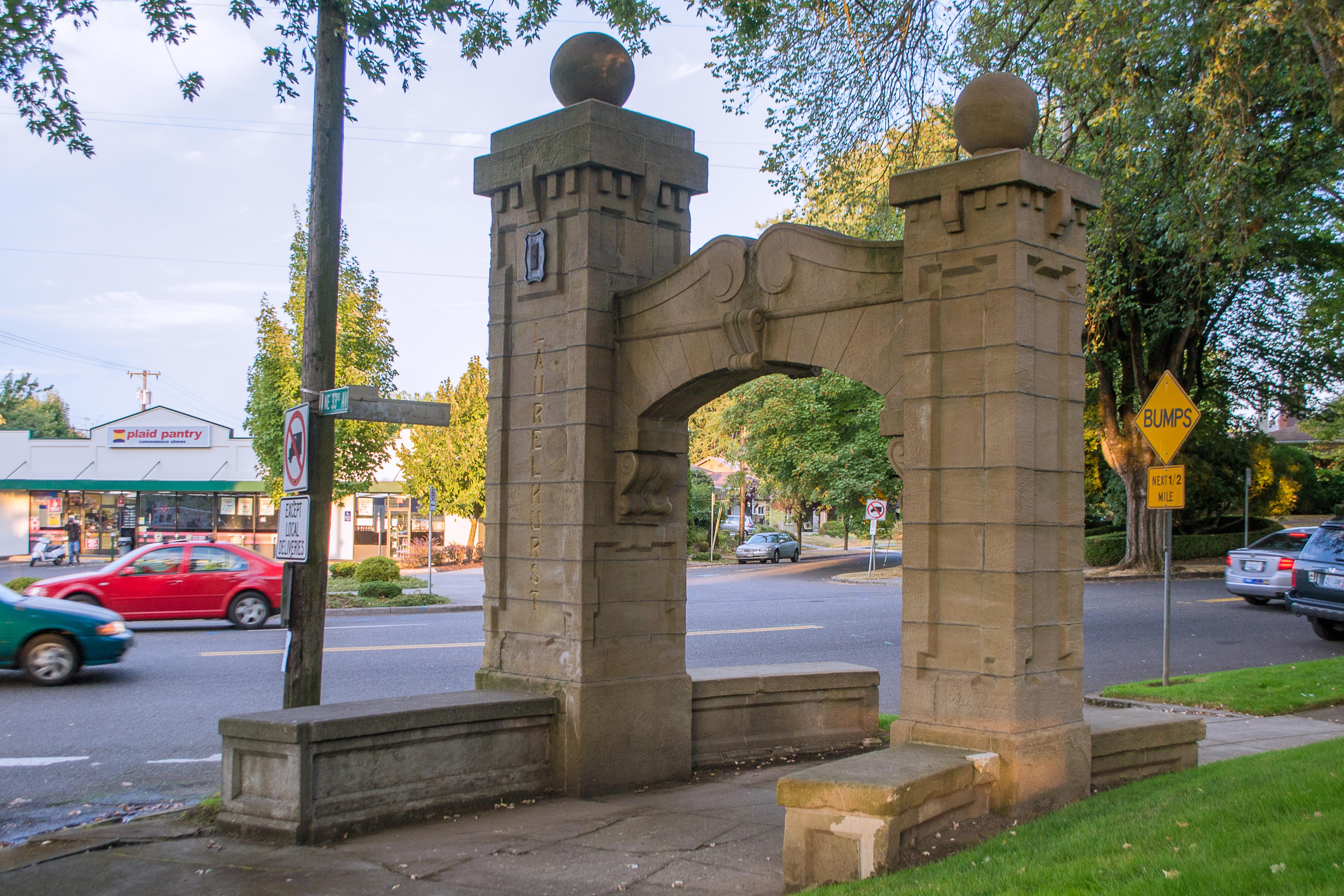
One of the arches from 1910: this one at NE 33rd and Peerless Place.

In 1909, the Ladd Estate Company (of William S. Ladd) sold its 462-acre (1.87 km^{2}) Hazel Fern Farm to the Laurelhurst Company for approximately $2 million. The name Laurelhurst was borrowed from a residential development in Seattle that Laurelhurst Company general manager Paul Murphy had recently completed. The name combined a reference to the laurel shrubbery near the Seattle development with the Old English hurst, denoting a wooded hill. The Laurelhurst Company platted a residential development of 144 acres (0.58 km^{2}) with the help of co-investor and landscape architect John Charles Olmsted. As the first houses were being built, the city purchased 31 acres (130,000 m^{2}) for $92,000 to construct Laurelhurst Park. Advertised as a "High Class Residence Park," the Laurelhurst Company placed numerous restrictions on the neighborhood. Similar to the Ladd's Addition development, the sale of alcohol was prohibited. Additionally, there were to be no apartments, hotels, motels, flats, stables, or commercial buildings, and no homes were to be sold to Chinese, Japanese, or African Americans.

The Laurelhurst Neighborhood Association (LNA) met as massive changes to Portland's transportation options were discussed in the 1970s, which included the eventual construction of the first TriMet MAX Light Rail line in the 1980s. LNA and the community endorsed light rail being placed in the Banfield corridor, but was strongly opposed to alignment along the Burnside corridor, either a busway or light rail. A 1978 petition submitted by 34 neighbors objected "to any parking, widening, or lane changes on East Burnside Street in the Laurelhurst area now or in the future", calling it "a serious threat" to the neighborhood, that would lower property values, and be "a definite threat to our daily living pattern and destroy our neighborhood." The Portland-wide study noted a requirement to minimize projects "specifically in the Laurelhurst area". KXL-FM reported proximity to Laurelhurst Park was a selling point for realtors in this neighborhood until the homeless camp situation.

=== Redlining and racial covenant ===
In 1913, a racial covenant governing development of Laurelhurst mandated "...nor shall the same or any part thereof be in any manner used or occupied by Chinese, Japanese or negroes, except that persons of said races may be employed as servants by residents."

A 1934 redlining map of Portland assigned the areas within current Laurelhurst boundaries with a blue grade, or "Still Desirable." Regarding the B19 tract, mapmakers noted "homogenous surroundings, improvements, and population" as among the neighborhood's favorable influences and called the subdivision's origins "a well conceived promotion, honestly administered"; regarding inhabitants, no foreign-born or Black inhabitants were reported.

=== Neighborhood quality of life ===
The official neighborhood representative Laurelhurst Neighborhood Association sought to prevent homeless camps within 1,000 feet (300 m) of schools, parks and where children congregate and further proposing that those who camp in this area be fined up to $100 or sent to jail for up to 30 days. Its members also vocally opposed development in the neighborhood to increase housing availability.

The Laurelhurst School was opened in 1918 and was originally named Scott School, after the first editor of The Oregonian. It was renamed to Laurelhurst School in 1925 along with the construction of the building that sits there today.

== See also ==
- National Register of Historic Places listings in Northeast Portland, Oregon
- National Register of Historic Places listings in Southeast Portland, Oregon
