= Iron law =

The term iron law is derived from Goethe's "great, eternal iron laws" in his poem Das Göttliche, (On The Divine) and may refer to:

- Hoffman's iron law, regarding speaker system design
- Iron Law (painting), a 1984 painting by Odd Nerdrum
- Iron law of population, from Thomas Malthus' An Essay on the Principle of Population (1798)
- Iron law of wages, from Ferdinand Lassalle's Subsistence theory of wages (mid 19th century)
- Iron law of oligarchy, from Michels' Political Parties
- Iron law of processor performance, posited by Joel Emer
- Iron law of prohibition, from Cohen's How the Narcs Created Crack
- Iron law of bureaucracy, from Jerry Pournelle
- Operation Iron Law, a military operation conducted by the Israel Defense Forces in March 2011

== See also ==
- Iron cage
