= 1984 in art =

Events from the year 1984 in art.

== Events ==
- November 6 - The Turner Prize is awarded for the first time, to Malcolm Morley.
- Neue Slowenische Kunst is established.
- First Nordik art historians' conference held, "Nordic art around the turn of the century" in Helsinki. The work of Hilma af Klint (1862–1944) is first revealed publicly, by Åke Fant.
- Eric Hebborn admits to art forgery.
- An x-ray of Jean-François Millet's 1870 painting The Young Shepherdess, in the collection of the Museum of Fine Arts in Boston, reveals an earlier painting previously presumed destroyed, The Captivity of the Jews in Babylon.

== Awards ==
- Archibald Prize: Keith Looby – Max Gillies

== Works ==
- Alberto Burri – Cretto di Burri ("Il Grande Cretto", land art, Gibellina, Sicily, Italy; work begins)
- John Doubleday – Statue of Dylan Thomas (Marina, Swansea)
- Jean Dubuffet – Monument with Standing Beast (fiberglass sculpture, Chicago Loop)
- Felim Egan – Battle of Hercules and Antaeus
- Steve Gillman – From Within Shalom (sculpture, Portland, Oregon)
- Frederick Hart – Three Soldiers (bronze statue)
- Nancy Holt – Dark Star Park, Rosslyn, Virginia
- Keith Jellum – Electronic Poet (sculpture, Portland, Oregon)
- Nabil Kanso – Apocalyptic Riders (diptych)
- Lee Kelly – Akbar's Garden (sculpture, Eugene, Oregon)
- R. B. Kitaj – Cecil Court, London W.C.2. (The Refugees) (1983-84)
- Roy Lichtenstein – Brushstrokes in Flight (sculpture, Columbus, Ohio)
- Steve McCurry – Afghan Girl (photographic portrait)
- Malcolm Morley - Farewell to Crete
- Odd Nerdrum – Iron Law
- Humphrey Ocean – Philip Larkin
- Roland Poska – From Blue to Blue
- Gleb Savinov – Nevsky Prospekt
- Kenny Scharf - When the Worlds Collide
- Frank Stella - Smoke Sculpture Form
- Paul Sutinen – In the Shadow of the Elm (sculpture, Portland, Oregon)
- David Wojnarowicz - F--- You F----- F----- (painting)

== Exhibitions ==
- May 20 until September 9 - American Neo-Expressionists at the Aldrich Museum of Contemporary Art in Ridgefield, Connecticut.

== Births ==
- May 4 – Joe Simpson, English figurative painter
- November 29 – Yoriyas, Moroccan street photographer and breakdancer
- .

== Deaths ==
=== January to June ===
- January 7 – Virgilio Guidi, Italian painter (b. 1891)
- February 6
  - Jimmy Ernst, American painter born in Germany (b. 1920)
  - Ronald Moody, Jamaican-born woodcarver (b. 1900)
- February 12 – Tom Keating, English art restorer and forger (b. 1917)
- March 16 – John Hoagland, American photographer (b. 1947)
- March 20 – Paule Vézelay, English painter (b. 1892)
- April 22 – Ansel Adams, American photographer (b. 1902)
- April 23 – Sir Roland Penrose, English Surrealist painter and art collector (b. 1900)
- June 3 – Peter Wilson, English art auctioneer (b. 1913)
- June 19 – Lee Krasner, American abstract expressionist painter (b. 1908)

=== July to December ===
- July 7 – Dirk Hannema, Dutch museum director and art collector (b. 1895).
- July 8 – Brassaï, Hungarian photographer, sculptor and filmmaker (b. 1899)
- July 9 – Peter Hurd, American artist (b. 1904)
- August 2 – Quirino Cristiani, Argentine animation director and cartoonist (b. 1896).
- September 16 – Meredith Frampton, English portrait painter (b. 1894)
- October 7 – Arnold Akberg, Estonian painter (b. 1894)
- October 29 – Jacques Adnet, French modernist designer, architect and interior designer (b. 1900).
- December 1 – Roelof Frankot, Dutch painter (b. 1911)
- December 2 - Edward James, British Surrealist art collector and poet (b. 1907)

== See also ==
- 1984 in fine arts of the Soviet Union
