= George Fite Waters =

American sculptor (1894–1961)

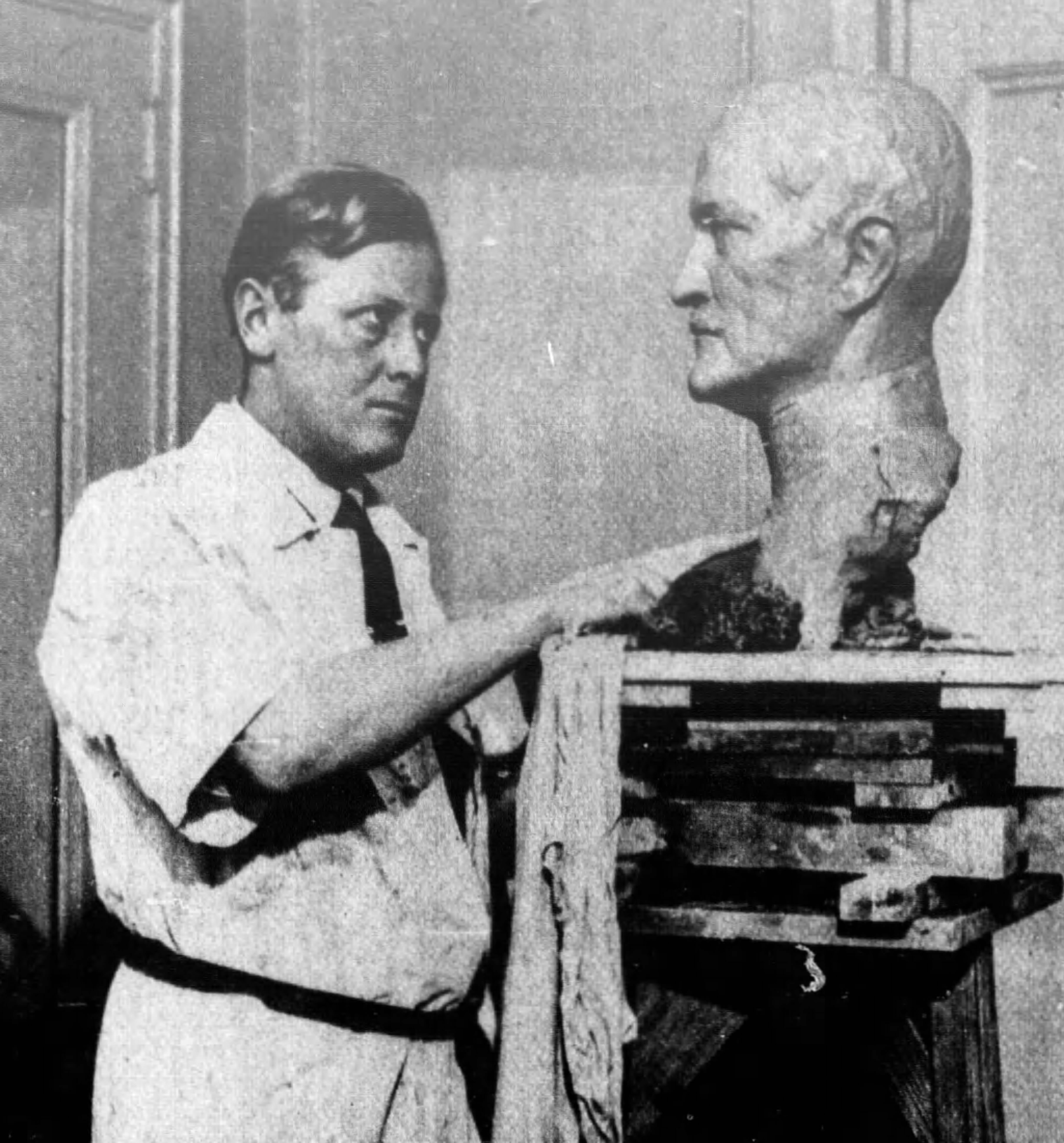
- Born: October 6, 1894; San Francisco, California, US
- Died: 1961 (aged 66–67); Greenwich, Connecticut, US
- Occupation: Sculptor

George Fite Waters (October 6, 1894 – 1961), an American sculptor, was born in San Francisco, California. He studied at the Art Students League of New York and later with Alexandre Falguière at the École des Beaux-Arts in Paris. Waters had the distinction of being the last student of famed sculptor Auguste Rodin." Rodin's influence on Waters' style and technique was profound. Waters' technique was described by The New York Times as "strong and vibratory, full of emotion and character".

Waters primarily worked in Paris and in London. He produced bronze busts of many of the famous people of his day, including Italian writer Luigi Pirandello, opera singer Ganna Walska, actor Sacha Guitry, actress Elsie Janis, General John J. Pershing, Irish President Cosgrove, as well as a statue of Peter Pan. Waters sometimes used an early motion picture camera to film his subjects, and later used the projecting film as a reference tool while he worked. In December 1923, Waters had an "Exhibition of Portraits in Bronze" at the Galleries George Petit in Paris which featured 26 of his works, including busts of composer Giacomo Puccini, tenor Vladimir Rosing, and dancer Ida Rubinstein. He also exhibited at the Salon des Artistes Francaises in 1932. Waters’ bronzes were mostly cast at the famous Valsuani foundry, known for its casts of the works of Renoir, Picasso, Matisse, and Gauguin.

George Fite Waters is best known in America for his public statues of President Abraham Lincoln in Portland, Oregon, and John Brown in Osawatomie, Kansas. Waters' statue of Lincoln was "monumental in proportions, ten feet high, showing Lincoln in the familiar frock coat and characteristic attitude, with head inclined and one leg well forward, giving an impression of great energy and restrained power." On October 11, 2020, protesters during Indigenous Peoples Day of Rage toppled and defaced the Lincoln statue, causing the City of Portland to have to remove it.

George Fite Waters died in Greenwich, Connecticut, on December 14, 1961.
