= Peace Chant =

Sculpture in Portland, Oregon

- The sculpture in 2016
- Artist: Steve Gillman
- Year: 1984
- Type: Sculpture
- Medium: Granite
- Location: Portland, Oregon, United States; 45°30′55″N 122°40′59″W

Peace Chant is an outdoor 1984 granite memorial sculpture by Steve Gillman, located at Southwest Park Avenue and Southwest Columbia Street in the South Park Blocks of Portland, Oregon.

== Description and history ==
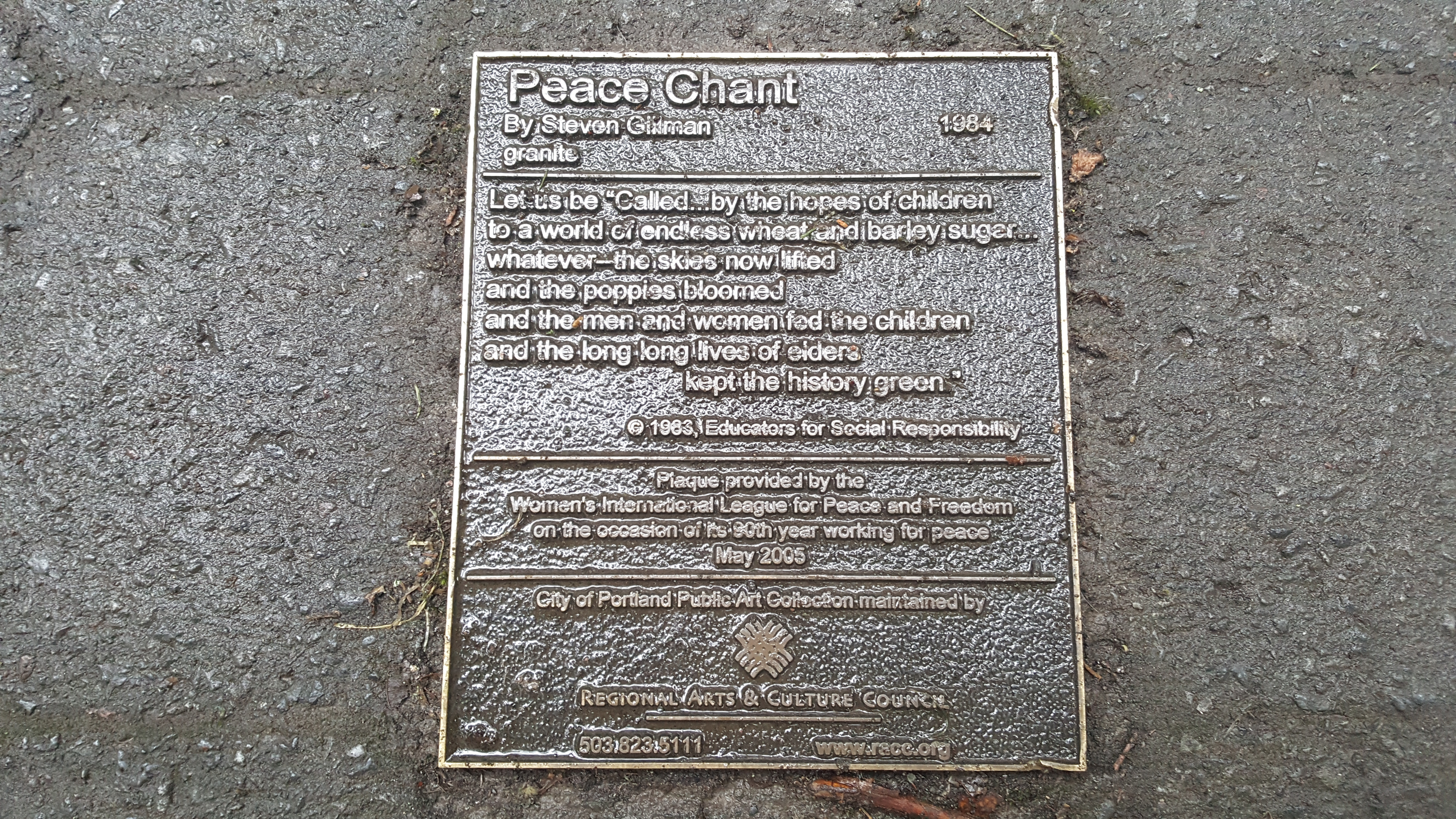
Plaque for the sculpture

Funded by the National Park Service and the City of Portland's Housing and Community Development department, it is the first known peace memorial in the state. Gillman intended for the sculpture to "create a space where people could sit and have quiet time" and wanted to "express his own advocacy for peace as well as that of the nearby churches".

The installation is composed of three large pillars. Displayed with the sculpture is a poem chosen by Gillam:

Let us be "Called...by the hopes of children
to a world of endless wheat and barley sugar...
whatever--the skies now lifted
and the poppies bloomed
and the men and women fed the children
and the long long lives of elders
kept the history green."

The Smithsonian Institution categorizes Peace Chant as both abstract and allegorical ("peace"). In May 1985, City Council named the block on which the sculpture is installed Peace Plaza.

== See also ==
- 1984 in art
- From Within Shalom (1984), another Portland sculpture by Gillman
