= Terence O'Donnell =

Terence O'Donnell (1924 - 2001) was an American writer. He was born in Portland, Oregon and graduated from the University of Chicago. He resided in Portland most of his life and worked at the Oregon Historical Society. During the latter part of his life, he spent some of his in an apartment on the South Park Blocks in Portland.

O'Donnell is perhaps best known as the author of the Garden of the Brave in War: Recollections of Iran, which was published in 1980, during the Iran hostage crisis. The book was praised by critics and, although it did not attain broad popular readership, it is now regarded as a classic work. It is told from a personal perspective, with observations about daily life and culture in southern Iran.

== Works by O'Donnell ==
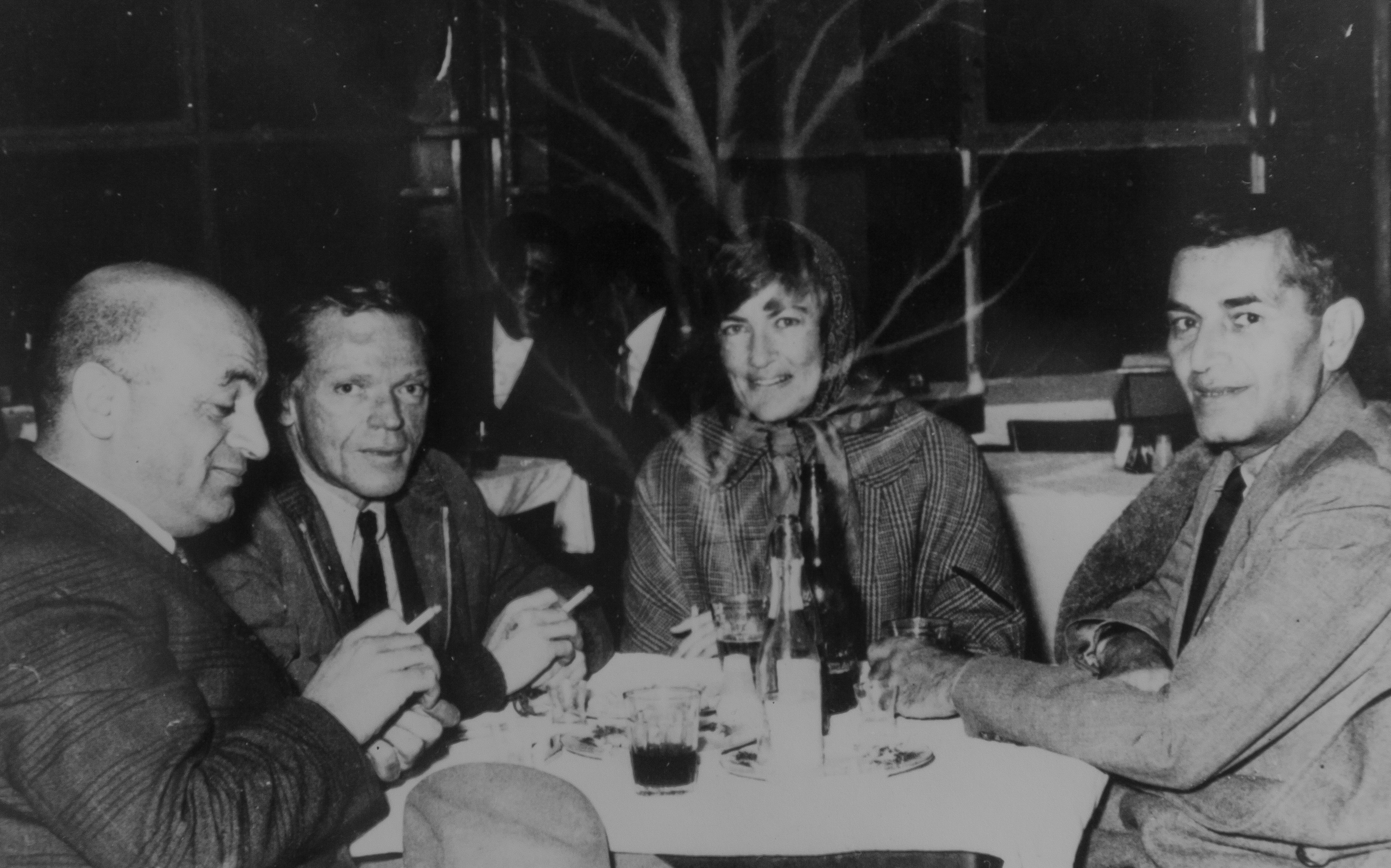
Terence O'Donnell in cafe in Estefan (second from left)

- Garden of the Brave in War: Recollections of Iran (New Haven: Ticknor & Fields, 1980) ISBN 0-89919-016-2
- That Balance So Rare: The Story of Oregon (Portland: Oregon Historical Society, 1988) ISBN 0-87595-202-X
- An Arrow in the Earth: General Joel Palmer and the Indians of Oregon (Portland: Oregon Historical Society, 1991) ISBN 0-87595-155-4
- Cannon Beach: A Place by the Sea (Portland: Oregon Historical Society, 1996) ISBN 0-87595-260-7
- "Seven Shades of Memory" (Washington D.C.: Mage Publishing, 1999) ISBN 0-934211-59-0
