= Indigenous Peoples Day of Rage =

2020 protest in Portland, Oregon, U.S.

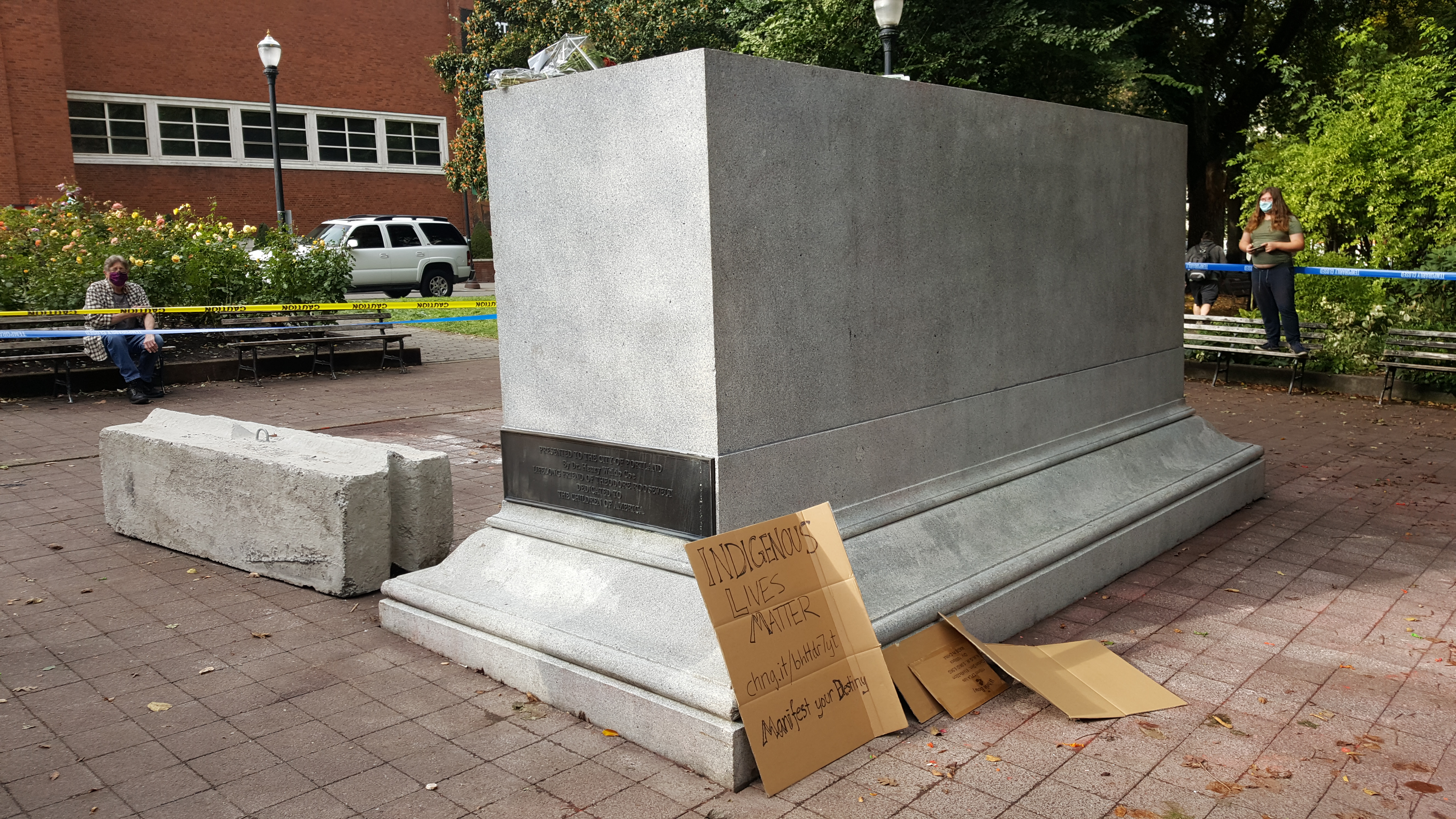
- Remnant base of Theodore Roosevelt, Rough Rider on October 12, 2020, following the toppling of Alexander Phimister Proctor's equestrian statue of Theodore Roosevelt by protesters
- Date: October 11, 2020; 5 years ago
- Venue: South Park Blocks
- Location: Portland, Oregon, United States
- Participants: 200
- Arrests: 3

The Indigenous Peoples Day of Rage, often abbreviated as the Day of Rage, was a protest held in Portland, Oregon on October 11, 2020. The demonstration was declared a riot by the Portland Police Bureau and saw the toppling of two statues in the South Park Blocks as well as vandalism to the Oregon Historical Society and other local businesses.

== Background ==
The Day of Rage was held on the eve of Indigenous Peoples' Day, a holiday commemorating Native American peoples which began as a counter-celebration held on the same day as the U.S. federal holiday of Columbus Day, which celebrates the anniversary of Christopher Columbus's arrival in the Americas on October 12, 1492. The City of Portland has recognized Indigenous Peoples' Day since 2015. The Day of Rage was organized amidst the COVID-19 pandemic and George Floyd protests, a series of demonstrations which began in May 2020 as part of the responses to the murder of George Floyd. Part of the response was the removal of monuments and memorials associated with racial injustice.

== Event ==
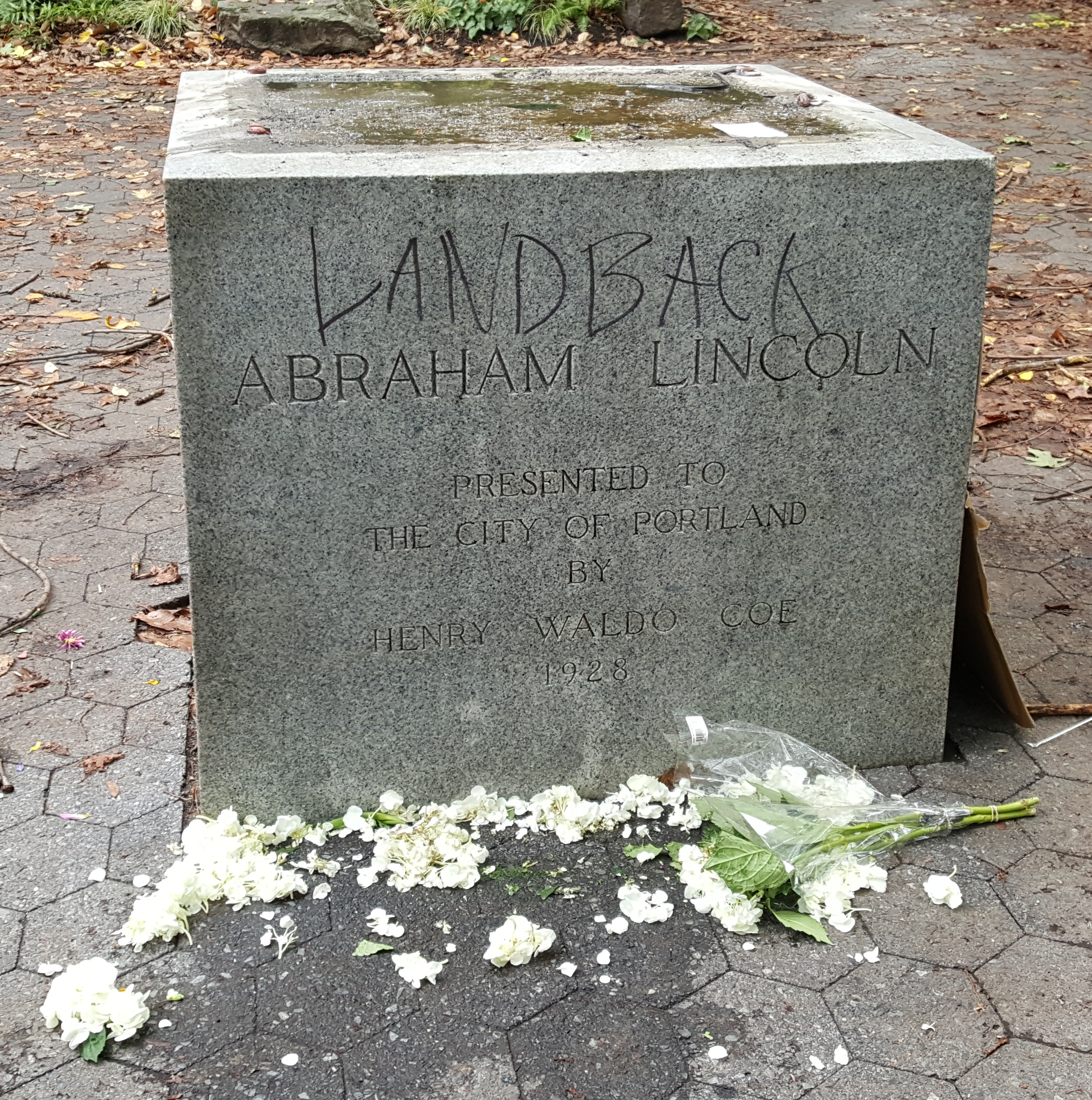
Base of the memorial to Abraham Lincoln after the statue was toppled

The protested attracted approximately 200 people. Demonstrators toppled the statue of Abraham Lincoln and Alexander Phimister Proctor's equestrian statue of Theodore Roosevelt called Theodore Roosevelt, Rough Rider (1922), and vandalized the Oregon Historical Society, among other buildings. The text "Dakota 38" was spray painted on the Lincoln memorial's base, referring to his role in a mass execution of Native Americans in Minnesota in 1862.

The Portland Police Bureau declared the protest a riot and said participants smashed windows on several buildings. Authorities arrested three people, including Malik Fard Muhamad, who was charged with "one count of unlawful possession of a firearm, one count of possession of a loaded firearm in public, one count of criminal mischief in the first degree and one count of riot".

== Reaction ==
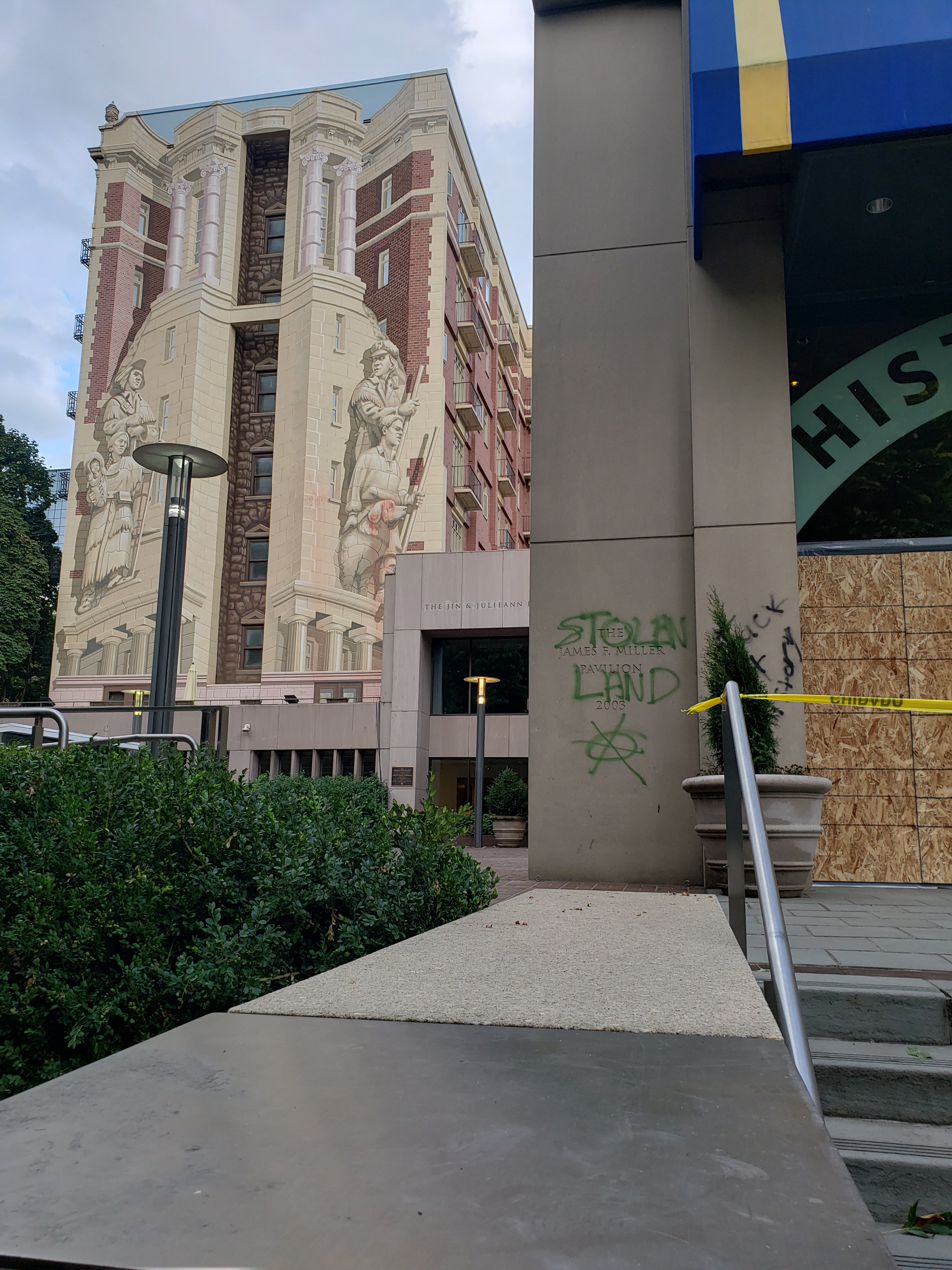
Boarded exterior and mural damage following vandalism to the Oregon Historical Society

The city's mayor Ted Wheeler said the event was "not an act of social justice" and called the rioters' actions "an attack on institutions that support the oppressed people protesters are defending".

Tawna Sanchez, a member of the Oregon House of Representatives representing the 43rd district covering parts of Portland, also described the destruction at the press conference. She condemned the rioters actions and said, "The violence doesn't work for us. We know that during the time of Standing Rock, the elders told us that the violence was not going to help. We also know, just in reality here, that we cannot tear down the system using fire or rocks or destruction and then build it back up from nothing." An Oregon Historical Society representative confirmed the museum's collection was unharmed. However, an "African-American heritage, bicentennial quilt" deemed a "priceless piece of history" was stolen and retrieved a few blocks away. The quilt was wet but salvageable.

U.S President Donald Trump posted three tweets about the protest. The first said, "Taking advantage of fools. Law & Order! Portland, call in the Feds!", and a second read, "These are Biden fools. ANTIFA RADICALS. Get them FBI, and get them now!" The third said, "The FBI and Law Enforcement must focus their energy on ANTIFA and the Radical Left, those who have spent the summer trying to burn down poorly run Democrat Cities throughout the USA!"

The Portland Indian Leaders Roundtable released a statement which said in part:

We, the members of the Portland Indian Leaders Roundtable, disapprove of the destruction and theft of property, and threat of violence by those participating in demonstrations last night. As with other resistance movements who have turned out in countless numbers this year, we understand that there is justifiable righteous indignation over the unconscionable mistreatment of our people and communities over centuries, and that Indigenous People's Day is a time to reflect and speak out against these injustices. Yet, we cannot condone pointless acts of vandalism and the brandishing of weapons that serve only to detract from the real message that must be heard: Indigenous people continue to suffer at the will of systems designed to eradicate our self-determination, culture, economies, and families. Until we dismantle those systems, there will be no justice.
