= Theodore Roosevelt, Rough Rider =

Bronze equestrian statue by Alexander Phimister Proctor in Portland, Oregon

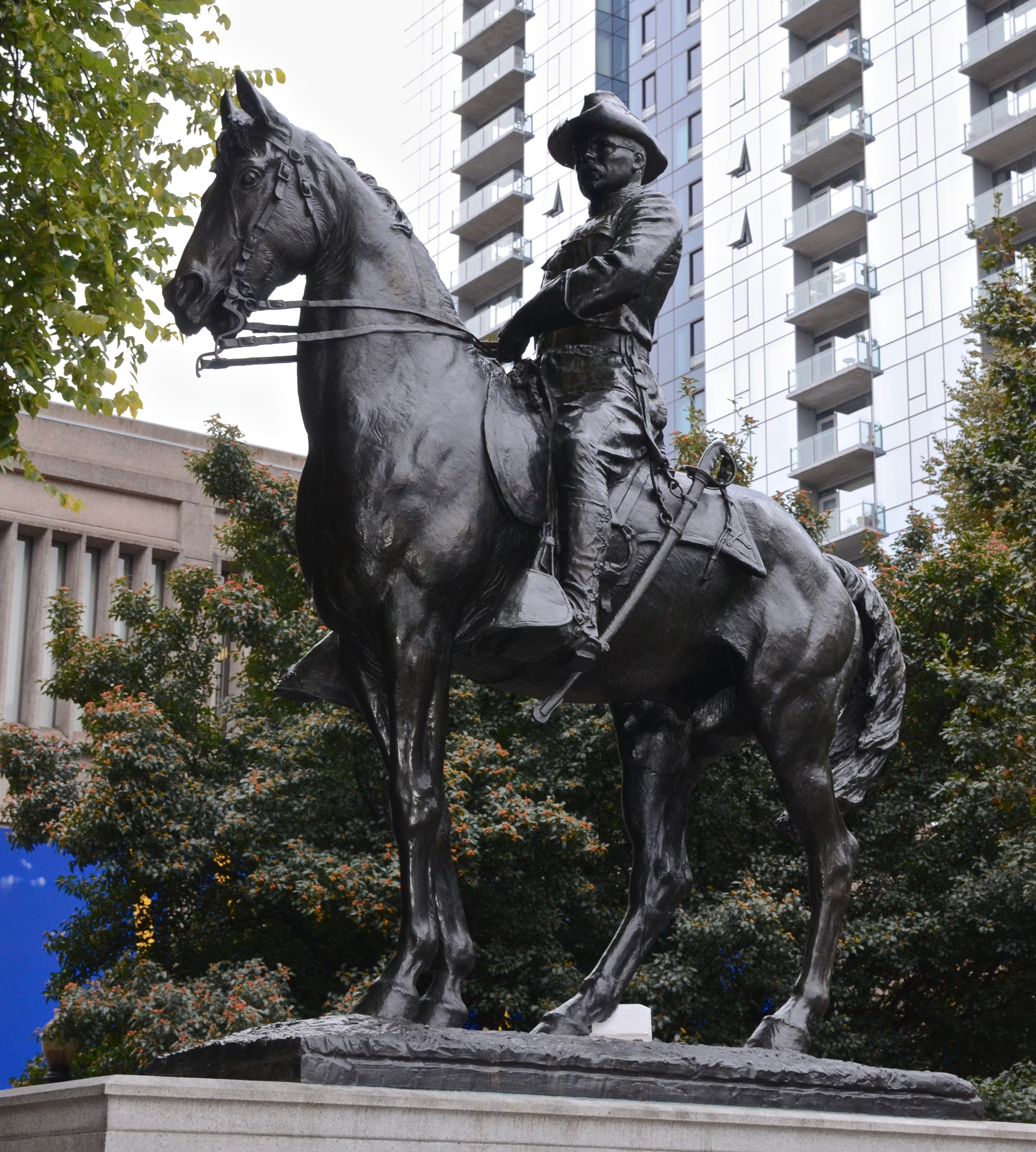
- The sculpture in 2016
- Artist: Alexander Phimister Proctor
- Year: 1922
- Type: Sculpture
- Medium: Bronze
- Subject: Theodore Roosevelt
- Dimensions: 3.7 m × 0.91 m × 2.7 m (12 ft × 3 ft × 9 ft)
- Condition: "Treatment needed" (1993)
- Location: Portland, Oregon, United States; 45.516030°N 122.682854°W

Theodore Roosevelt, Rough Rider is a bronze sculpture by American artist Alexander Phimister Proctor, formerly located in the South Park Blocks of Portland, Oregon in the United States. The equestrian statue was completed in 1922 and depicts Theodore Roosevelt as the leader of the cavalry regiment that fought during the Spanish–American War called the Rough Riders. It was toppled by demonstrators during the Indigenous Peoples Day of Rage in October 2020. The statue is set to be restored and re-installed at a yet to be determined date.

== Description ==
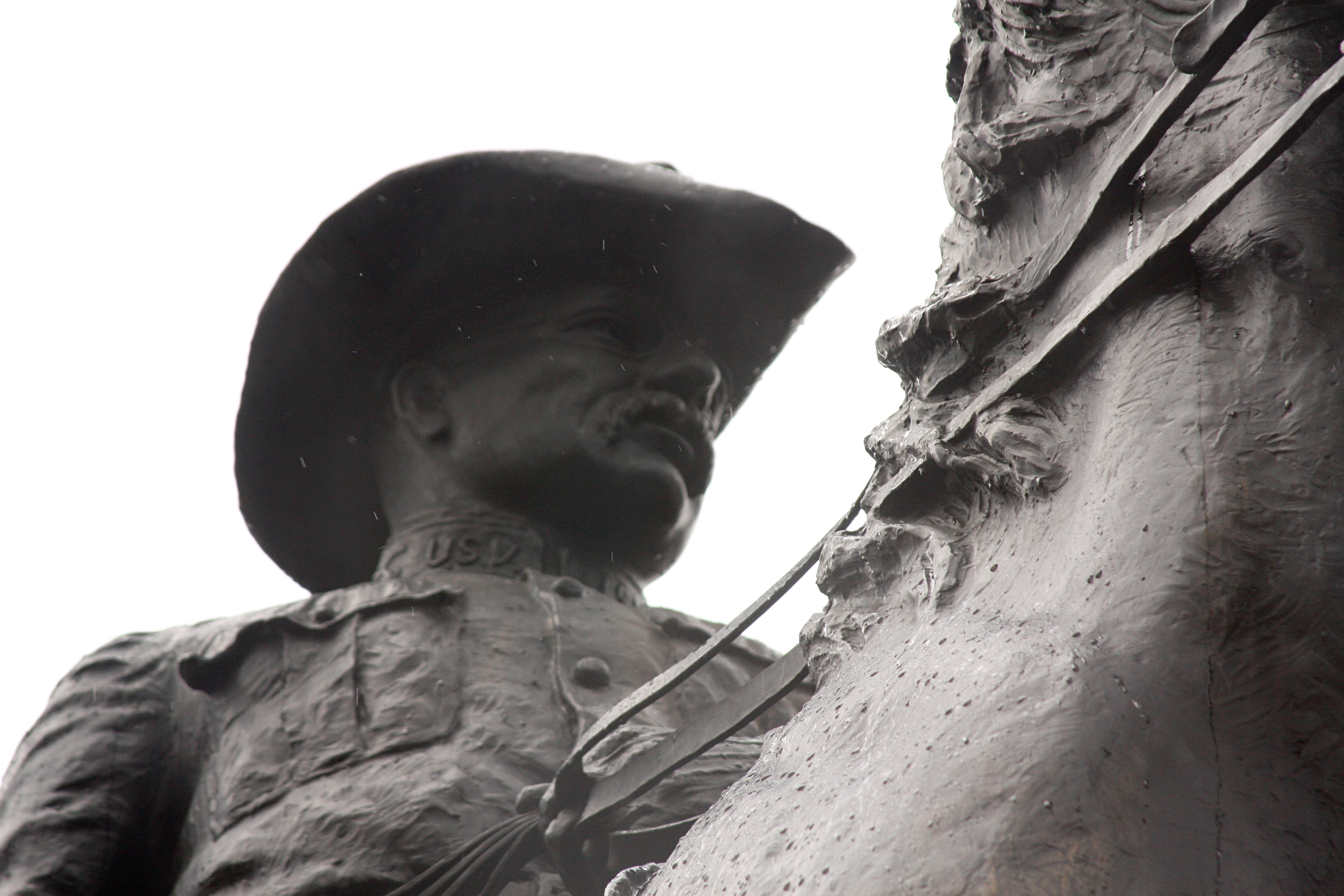
Detail of the sculpture, 2009

Theodore Roosevelt, Rough Rider is an equestrian statue designed by American sculptor Alexander Phimister Proctor (1860–1950). The bronze sculpture depicts Theodore Roosevelt, former President of the United States, as the leader of the cavalry regiment called the Rough Riders, who fought during the Spanish–American War. According to the Regional Arts & Culture Council, which administers the work, "Proctor took great care in accurately depicting Roosevelt as a symbol of American determination, success, and strength and as a bridge back to the Wild West." The statue is located in Portland's South Park Blocks, along Southwest Park Avenue between Southwest Jefferson and Madison Streets. It measures 12 feet (3.7 m) × 3 feet (0.91 m) × 9 feet (2.7 m) and is mounted to a base that measures 7 feet 8 inches (2.34 m) long × 6 feet (1.8 m) high × 1 foot 6 inches (0.46 m) wide.

== History ==
The memorial was commissioned after Roosevelt's death. Completed in 1922, the sculpture was cast in Brooklyn, New York, and was shipped by sea via the Panama Canal to avoid cutting the work into pieces. Henry Waldo Coe, a friend and hunting partner of Roosevelt's, donated the statue to the City of Portland. Calvin Coolidge, then Vice President of the United States, was present at the statue's dedication.

The creation of the statue was documented by the Metropolitan Museum of Art in its 1922 film, The Making of a Bronze Statue. This film was the first time that the entire process of creating a bronze statue by the lost-wax method of casting was photographed. The Metropolitan Museum of Art made this film available on Youtube in January 2023. https://www.youtube.com/watch?v=rPJZwlnw-rc

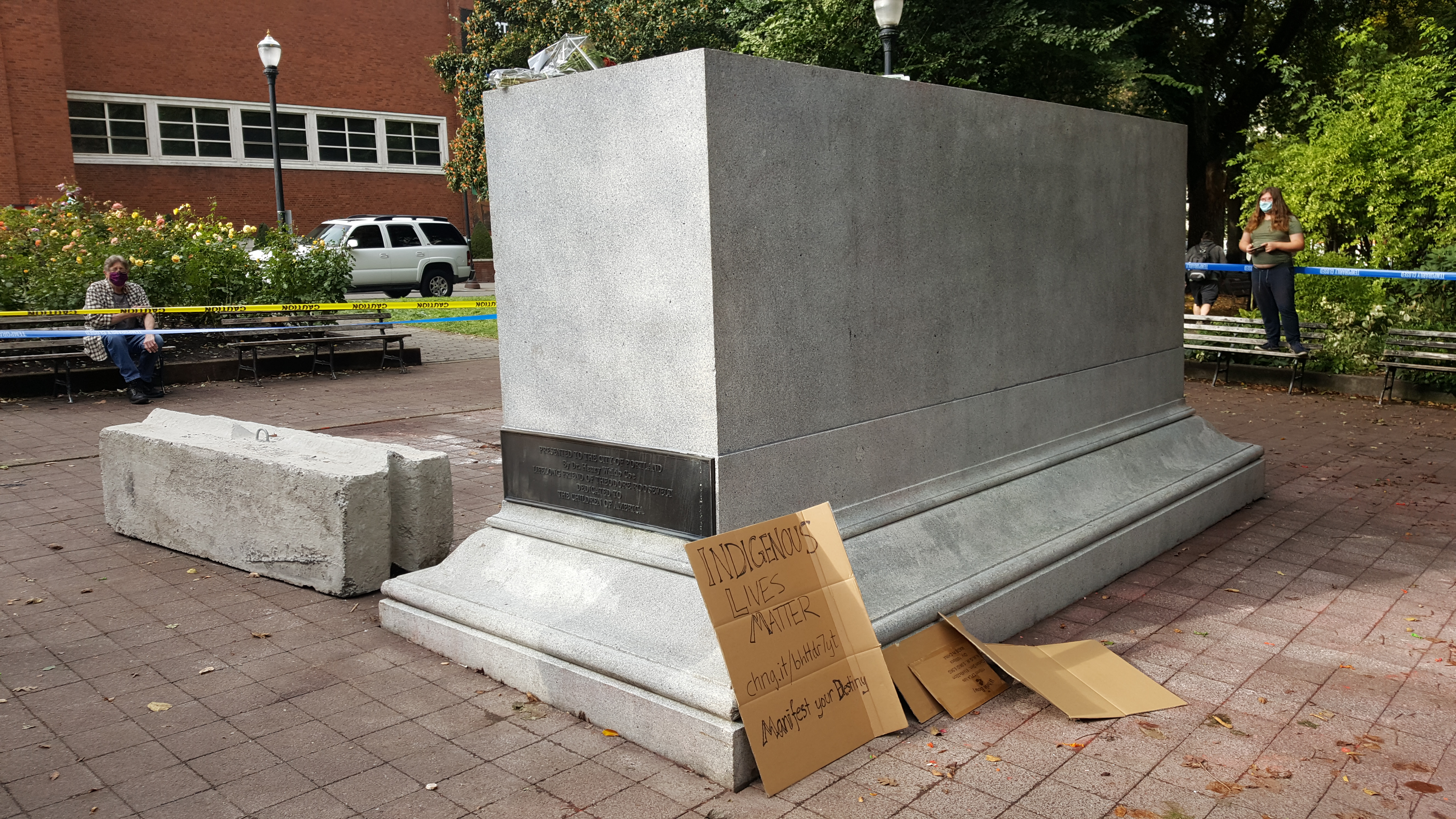
The pedestal after the statue was toppled during the Indigenous Peoples Day of Rage in 2020

The statue's condition was deemed "treatment needed" by the Smithsonian Institution's "Save Outdoor Sculpture!" program in April 1993. It was toppled by demonstrators during the Indigenous Peoples Day of Rage in October 2020, along with the nearby statue of Abraham Lincoln, in what Portland police declared a riot.

On July 28, 2021, Stan Pulliam, the mayor of Sandy, Oregon, proposed to have the Roosevelt statue and two other Portland statues, one of Lincoln and one of Washington, reinstalled in Sandy, Oregon. He said: "When we heard last week that the city of Portland is considering not putting the statues back up we decided we're tired of the embarrassment"

In 2024, the city announced that the statue would be re-installed at a yet to be determined date after restoration and repair.

== See also ==
- 1922 in art
- List of equestrian statues in the United States
- List of monuments and memorials removed during the George Floyd protests
- List of sculptures of presidents of the United States
- Rough Riders Memorial (1907), Arlington National Cemetery
