= Statue of Abraham Lincoln (Portland, Oregon) =

Statue of Abraham Lincoln in Portland, Oregon

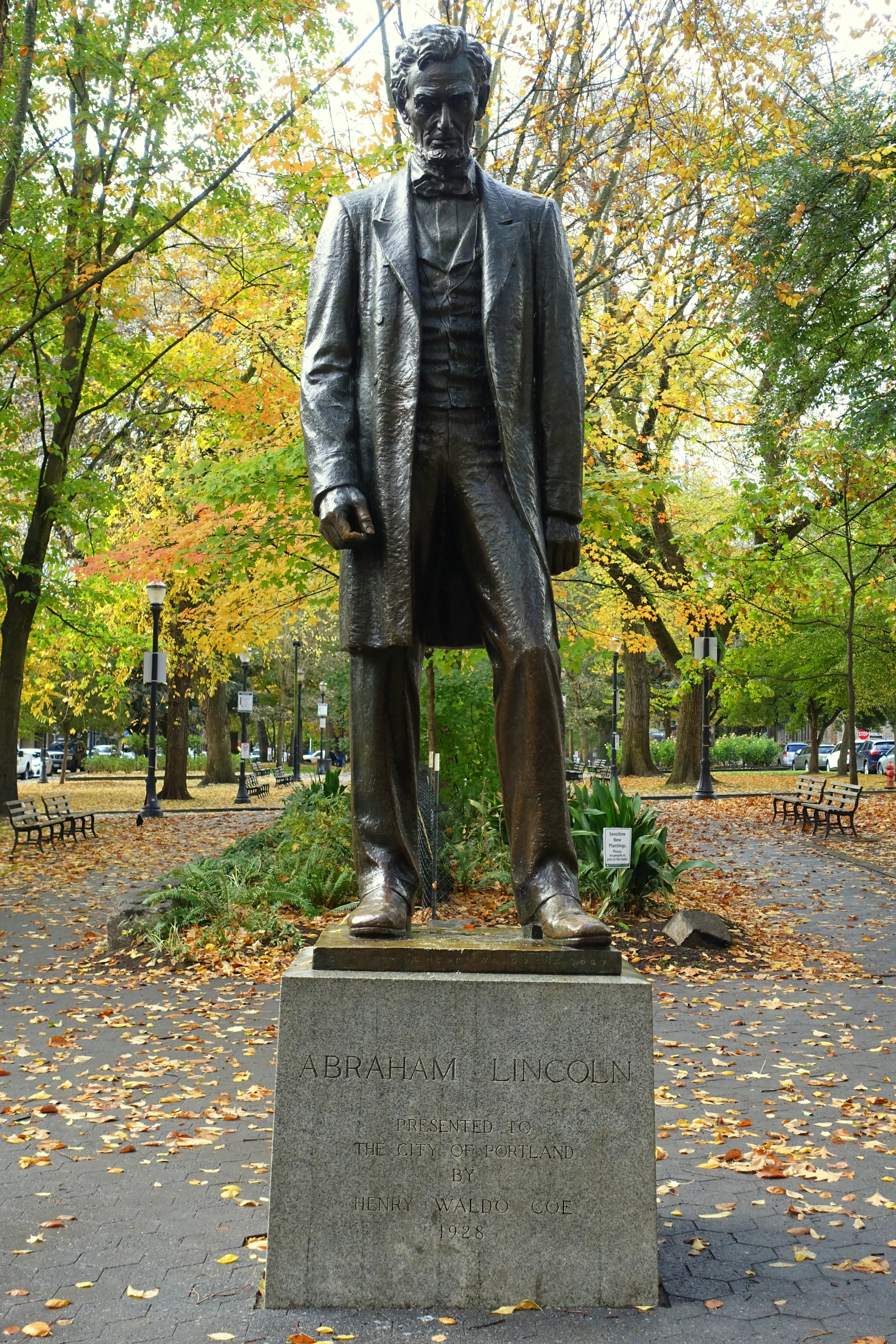
- The sculpture in 2017
- Artist: George Fite Waters
- Year: 1928
- Type: Sculpture
- Medium: Bronze
- Subject: Abraham Lincoln
- Location: Portland, Oregon, United States; 45.51674°N 122.68242°W

A bronze statue of Abraham Lincoln by George Fite Waters was installed in Portland, Oregon's South Park Blocks, in the United States, until 2020, when it was toppled by protestors. The 10-foot statue was donated by Henry Waldo Coe, and its anticipated reinstallation is set for summer/fall 2026.

== History ==
The statue was cast at Claude Valsuani's foundry in France in 1927, on Lincoln's birthday, and was dedicated on October 5, 1928.

Protesters toppled the statue during the Indigenous Peoples Day of Rage in October 2020, along with the nearby Theodore Roosevelt, Rough Rider.

On July 28, 2021, Stan Pulliam, the mayor of Sandy, Oregon proposed to have the Lincoln statue, Theodore Roosevelt, Rough Rider, and the statue of George Washington reinstalled in Sandy. He said, "When we heard last week that the city of Portland is considering not putting the statues back up we decided we’re tired of the embarrassment."

In 2024, the city announced that the statue would be re-installed. Its installation was set for the summer of 2025, but has since been updated to the summer or fall of 2026.

== See also ==
- 1928 in art
- List of monuments and memorials removed during the George Floyd protests
- List of sculptures of presidents of the United States
- List of statues of Abraham Lincoln
