= Statue of George Washington (Portland, Oregon) =

Statue of George Washington in Portland, Oregon

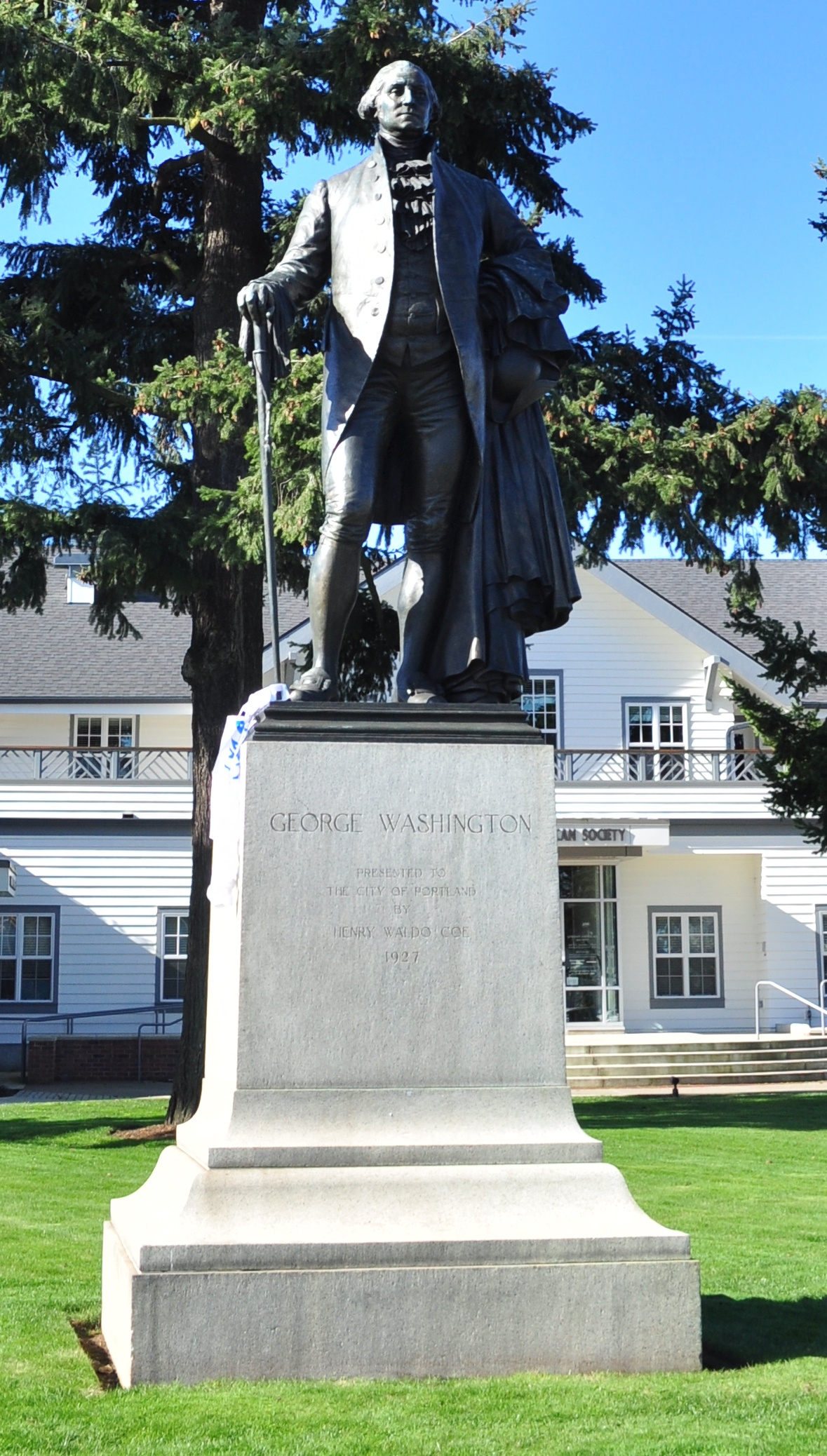
- The statue in 2015
- Artist: Pompeo Coppini
- Year: 1926–1927
- Medium: Bronze sculpture; granite (base)
- Subject: George Washington
- Dimensions: 2.4 m × 1.2 m × 1.2 m (8 ft × 4 ft × 4 ft)
- Location: Portland, Oregon, United States; 45.542235°N 122.605054°W
- Owner: City of Portland and Multnomah County Public Art Collection courtesy of the Regional Arts & Culture Council

A 1926–27 statue of George Washington by Italian American artist Pompeo Coppini was installed in northeast Portland, Oregon, United States. The bronze sculpture was the second of three statues of Washington by the artist, following a similar statue installed in Mexico City in 1912 and preceding another installed on the University of Texas at Austin campus in February 1955. The Portland statue was created to commemorate the 1926 sesquicentennial of the Declaration of Independence and dedicated in 1927. It was part of the City of Portland and Multnomah County Public Art Collection. In June 2020, it was toppled by protestors. In 2024, the city announced plans to re-install the statue at a yet to be determined location and date.

== Description ==
The statue was installed at the intersection of Northeast 57th Avenue and Northeast Sandy Boulevard, outside the German American Society (or Friendship Masonic Building), in northeast Portland's Rose City Park neighborhood. It depicted a standing Washington with a cane in his proper right hand and a coat and hat under his opposite arm, with his proper left hand on his hip. The bronze sculpture measured approximately 95 x 48 x 48 in., and rested on a granite base measuring approximately 95 x 84 x 84 in. An inscription on the front of the plinth read: "GEORGE WASHINGTON / PRESENTED TO / THE CITY OF PORTLAND / BY / HENRY WALDO COE / 1927". The back of the plinth had the inscription "GIFT FROM DR. HENRY WALDO COE 1926", and inscriptions on the side of the plinth read "P. COPPINI SC" and "CAST BY ROMAN BRONZE WORKS N.Y.".

== History ==
The Portland statue was created by Coppini in his New York studio in 1926, and cast by Roman Bronze Works. It was donated by Henry Waldo Coe, who commissioned a series of statues for the City of Portland which included Theodore Roosevelt, Rough Rider (1922), the equestrian statue of Joan of Arc, and those depicting Washington and Abraham Lincoln (1928). The latter two were dedicated after Coe's death in February 1927. The memorial's base was funded by the George Washington Memorial Association. The memorial was dedicated on July 4, 1927. Reverend Youngson presented the statue on the Coe family's behalf.

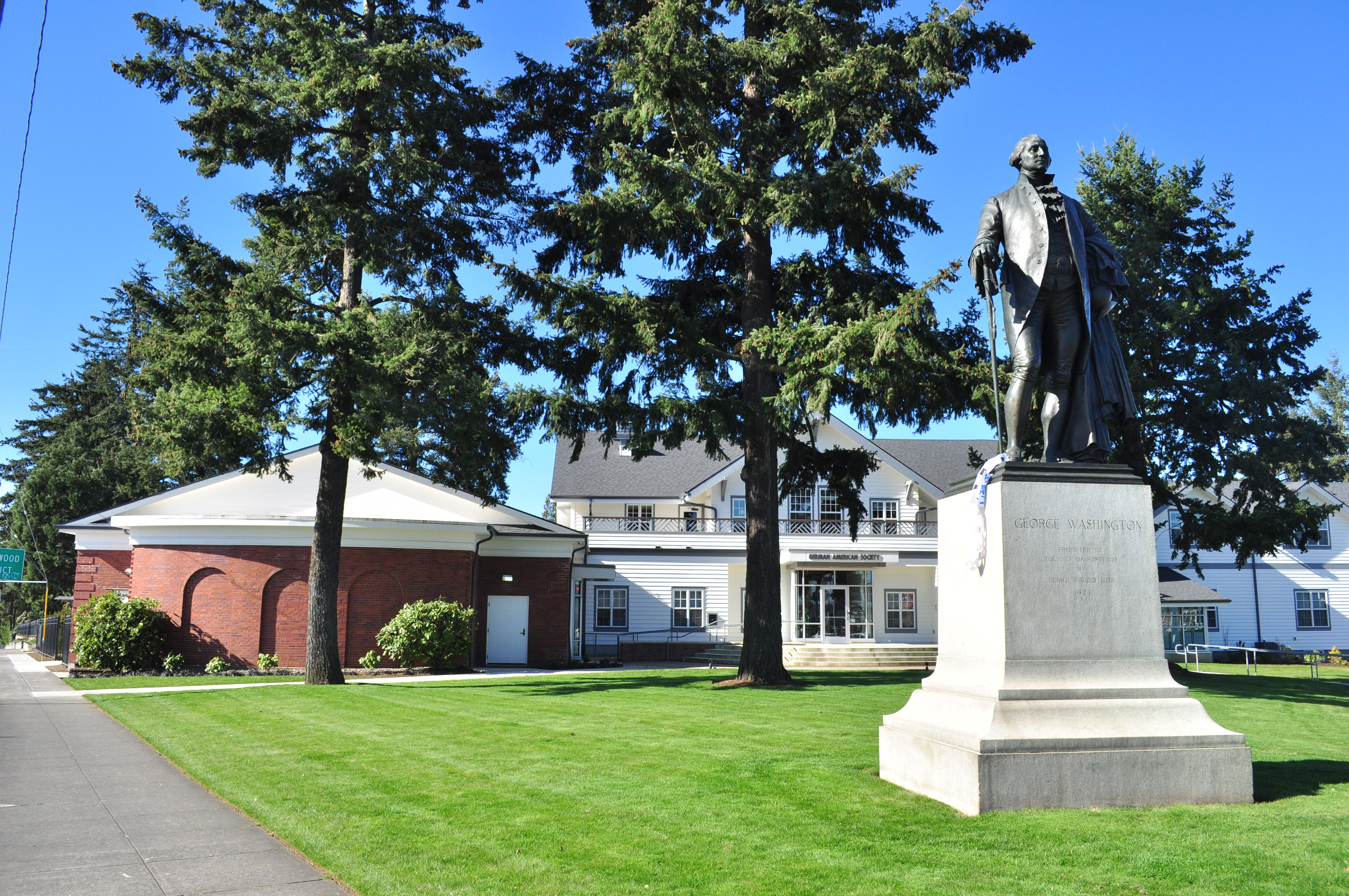
The statue outside the German American Society, 2015

The artwork was surveyed by the Smithsonian Institution's "Save Outdoor Sculpture!" program in 1993. It is part of the City of Portland and Multnomah County Public Art Collection courtesy of the Regional Arts & Culture Council. In 2020, during the COVID-19 pandemic, a face mask was affixed to the statue as well as other local artworks.

On the night of June 18, 2020, protesters set the statue aflame before toppling and defacing it with "Genocidal Colonist," "You're on native lands," "BLM," "Big Floyd," and "1619." In response to the murder of George Floyd, demonstrators also knocked down and damaged four other monuments across the city. On July 28, the mayor of Sandy, Oregon, Stan Pulliam, proposed to have the Washington statue, the statue of Abraham Lincoln, and Theodore Roosevelt, Rough Rider put back up on their property.

In 2024, the city announced plans to re-install the statue at a yet to be determined location and date.

== See also ==
- 1927 in art
- Cultural depictions of George Washington
- List of monuments and memorials removed during the George Floyd protests
- List of monuments dedicated to George Washington
- List of sculptures of presidents of the United States
- List of statues of George Washington
