= From Within Shalom =

Sculpture in Portland, Oregon

- The sculpture in 2016
- Artist: Steve Gillman
- Year: 1984
- Type: Sculpture
- Medium: Sculpture: Granite; Base: Concrete or stone
- Dimensions: 240 cm × 15 cm × 91 cm (95 in × 6 in × 36 in)
- Condition: "Treatment needed" (1993)
- Location: Portland, Oregon, United States; 45.51545°N 122.68358°W
- Owner: St. James Lutheran Church

From Within Shalom, or From Within, Shalom, is an outdoor 1984 granite sculpture by Steve Gillman, installed outside St. James Lutheran Church in Portland, Oregon, in the United States.

== Description and history ==
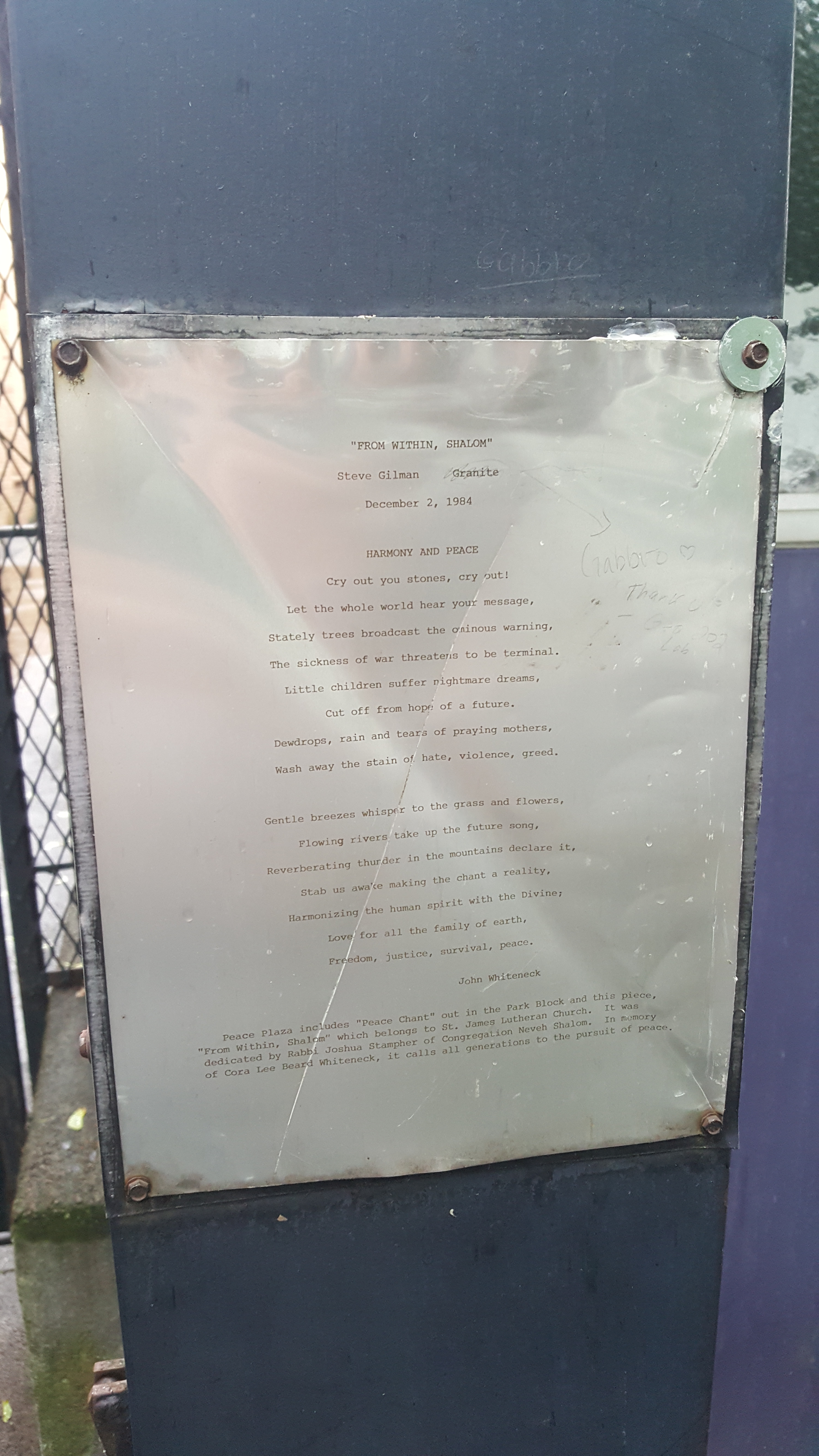
Signage

Steve Gillman's From Within Shalom (1984) is a granite sculpture installed outside Portland's St. James Lutheran Church (1315 Southwest Park), which owns the work. It is part of Peace Plaza and was donated by Generations of Peace and Douglas Strain in memory of Cora Lee Beard Whiteneck, the mother of John Whiteneck of Generations for Peace. R. A. Gray & Company served as the project's contractor.

The abstract (geometric), allegorical (peace) sculpture cost $2,500 and measures approximately 95 inches (240 cm) x 6 inches (15 cm) x 36 inches (91 cm). The Smithsonian Institution describes the piece as "two tall narrow triangles facing each other, as though they are one triangle which has been split down the middle. The parts that face each other are rough hewn and the rest is smooth." The sculpture rests on a concrete or stone base that measures approximately 4.5 inches (11 cm) x 31 inches (79 cm) x 48 inches (120 cm). Nearby plaques display an original poem written for the work. It was surveyed and deemed "treatment needed" by Smithsonian's "Save Outdoor Sculpture!" program in May 1993.

== See also ==
- 1984 in art
- Peace Chant (1984) another Portland sculpture by Gillman
- Shalom
