= Brushstrokes in Flight =

Sculpture by Roy Lichtenstein

- Artist: Roy Lichtenstein
- Year: 1984
- Type: Sculpture
- Dimensions: 7.9 m (26 ft)
- Location: John Glenn Columbus International Airport, Columbus, Ohio, US

Brushstrokes in Flight is a 1984 sculpture by Roy Lichtenstein, installed at the John Glenn Columbus International Airport in Columbus, Ohio. It is part of the Brushstrokes series of artworks that includes several paintings and sculptures whose subject is the actions made with a house-painter's brush.

It was commissioned by the Columbus Civic Arts Advisory Committee in 1982 for $150,000. It was first installed in the airport's courtyard in 1984, moved to a parking lot in 1985, then to Concourse B in 1998. It has since been moved elsewhere in the airport. In 1988, Columbus's mayor, Buck Rinehart, attempted to give the sculpture away to Columbus's sister city of Genoa, Italy as thanks for the 1955 statue of Christopher Columbus that stood outside Columbus City Hall, but fell through following opposition from the local art community and Columbus City Council.

A posthumous artist's proof was created in 2010 and is at Museo de Arte de Ponce in Ponce, Puerto Rico.

== See also ==
- 1984 in art
