= In the Shadow of the Elm =

Sculpture in Portland, Oregon

- The sculpture in 2015
- Artist: Paul Sutinen
- Year: 1984
- Type: Sculpture
- Medium: Granite
- Subject: Elm tree
- Dimensions: 14 m (45 ft); 12 m diameter (40 ft)
- Location: Portland, Oregon, United States; 45.51400°N 122.68393°W
- Owner: City of Portland and Multnomah County Public Art Collection courtesy of the Regional Arts & Culture Council

In the Shadow of the Elm is an outdoor 1984 sculpture by Paul Sutinen, located at the South Park Blocks in Portland, Oregon.

== Description and history ==
In the Shadow of the Elm, designed by Oregon artist Paul Sutinen and completed in 1984, was commissioned by the City of Portland as part of the South Park Blocks Redevelopment Project. According to the Regional Arts & Culture Council, which administers the sculpture, funding was provided by the City of Portland's Percent for Art program. The Smithsonian Institution lists Portland Parks & Recreation as the funding source.

Installed at Southwest Park Avenue and Southwest Market Street in Portland's South Park Blocks, the work depicts the shadow of an Elm tree with bare branches that used to stand at the site. The abstract mosaic inlay is made of 169 pieces of Sierra White granite, quarried in California by Great Northern Granite and Marble and each cut individually by Sutinen and his assistant Dale Jones. It measures 45 feet (14 m) wide and has a diameter of 40 feet (12 m). The sculpture includes two inscriptions: one on a limb at its northwest corner that reads "Paul Sutinen 1984" and another on a disc in south center that displays its name and the artist's signature. In the Shadow of the Elm is part of the City of Portland and Multnomah County Public Art Collection courtesy of the Regional Arts & Culture Council.

== See also ==
- 1984 in art
