= Iron law of processor performance =

In computer architecture, the iron law of processor performance (or simply iron law of performance) describes the performance trade-off between complexity and the number of primitive instructions that processors use to perform calculations. This formulation of the trade-off spurred the development of Reduced Instruction Set Computers (RISC) whose instruction set architectures (ISAs) leverage a smaller set of core instructions to improve performance. The term was coined by Douglas Clark based on research performed by Clark and Joel Emer in the 1980s.

== Explanation ==
The performance of a processor is the time it takes to execute a program: $\mathrm{\tfrac{Time}{Program}}$. This can be further broken down into three factors:

$$\mathrm{\frac{Instructions}{Program} \times \frac{Clock Cycles}{Instruction} \times \frac{Time}{Clock Cycles}}$$
Selection of an instruction set architecture affects $\mathrm{\tfrac{Instructions}{Program} \times \tfrac{Clock Cycles}{Instruction}}$, whereas $\mathrm{\tfrac{Time}{Clock Cycles}}$ is largely determined by the manufacturing technology. Classic Complex Instruction Set Computer (CISC) ISAs optimized $\mathrm{\tfrac{Instructions}{Program}}$ by providing a larger set of more complex CPU instructions. Generally speaking, however, complex instructions inflate the number of clock cycles per instruction $\mathrm{\tfrac{ClockCycles}{Instruction}}$ because they must be decoded into simpler microcode actually performed by the hardware. After converting X86 binary to the microcode used internally, the total number of operations is close to what is produced for a comparable RISC ISA. The iron law of processor performance makes this trade-off explicit and pushes for optimization of $\mathrm{\tfrac{Time}{Program}}$as a whole, not just a single component.

While the iron law is credited for sparking the development of RISC architectures, it does not imply that a simpler ISA is always faster. If that were the case, the fastest ISA would consist of simple binary logic. A single CISC instruction can be faster than the equivalent set of RISC instructions when it enables multiple micro-operations to be performed in a single clock cycle. In practice, however, the regularity of RISC instructions allowed a pipelined implementation where the total execution time of an instruction was (typically) ~5 clock cycles, but each instruction followed the previous instruction ~1 clock cycle later. CISC processors can also achieve higher performance using runtime optimization techniques such as modular extensions, predictive logic, compressed instructions, and macro-operation fusion.

== See also ==
- Reduced instruction set computer
- Classic RISC pipeline
