= Nordik =

NORDIK, or the Nordic Association for Art Historians, is an association of art historians from universities and museums in the Nordic countries. The committee was founded in Helsinki in 1984 to promote research networks between Nordic art historians. The main task of the committee since 1984 has been to organize the NORDIK conference every third year in a Nordic country. The board of NORDIK consists members from Denmark, Finland, Iceland, Norway and Sweden, and are appointed by the general assembly of NORDIK for a period of three years. The general assembly usually takes place in connection with the NORDIK conferences. The present committee was appointed by the general assembly that took place in connection with NORDIK.X in 2012 in Stockholm, Sweden. Chairman of NORDIK is prof. Jeff Werner, Stockholm University.

== Nordik conferences ==
- 1984 Helsinki, Finland. Nordic art around the turn of the century
- 1987 Gothenburg, Sweden. Nordic Sponsors of the Arts
- 1990 Ry, Denmark. Influence and Exchange
- 1993 Geilo, Norway. The identity of Art History
- 1996 Åbo/Turku, Finland. Art after 1945
- 2000 Uppsala, Sweden. The History of Art History
- 2003 Århus, Denmark. Exhibitions
- 2006 Bergen, Norway. Tradition and Visual Culture
- 2009 Jyväskylä, Finland. Mind and Matter.
- 2012 Stockholm, Sweden. Presentation/Representation/Repression
- 2015 Reykjavik, Iceland. Mapping uncharted territories
