= South Park Blocks =

Public park in Portland, Oregon, U.S.

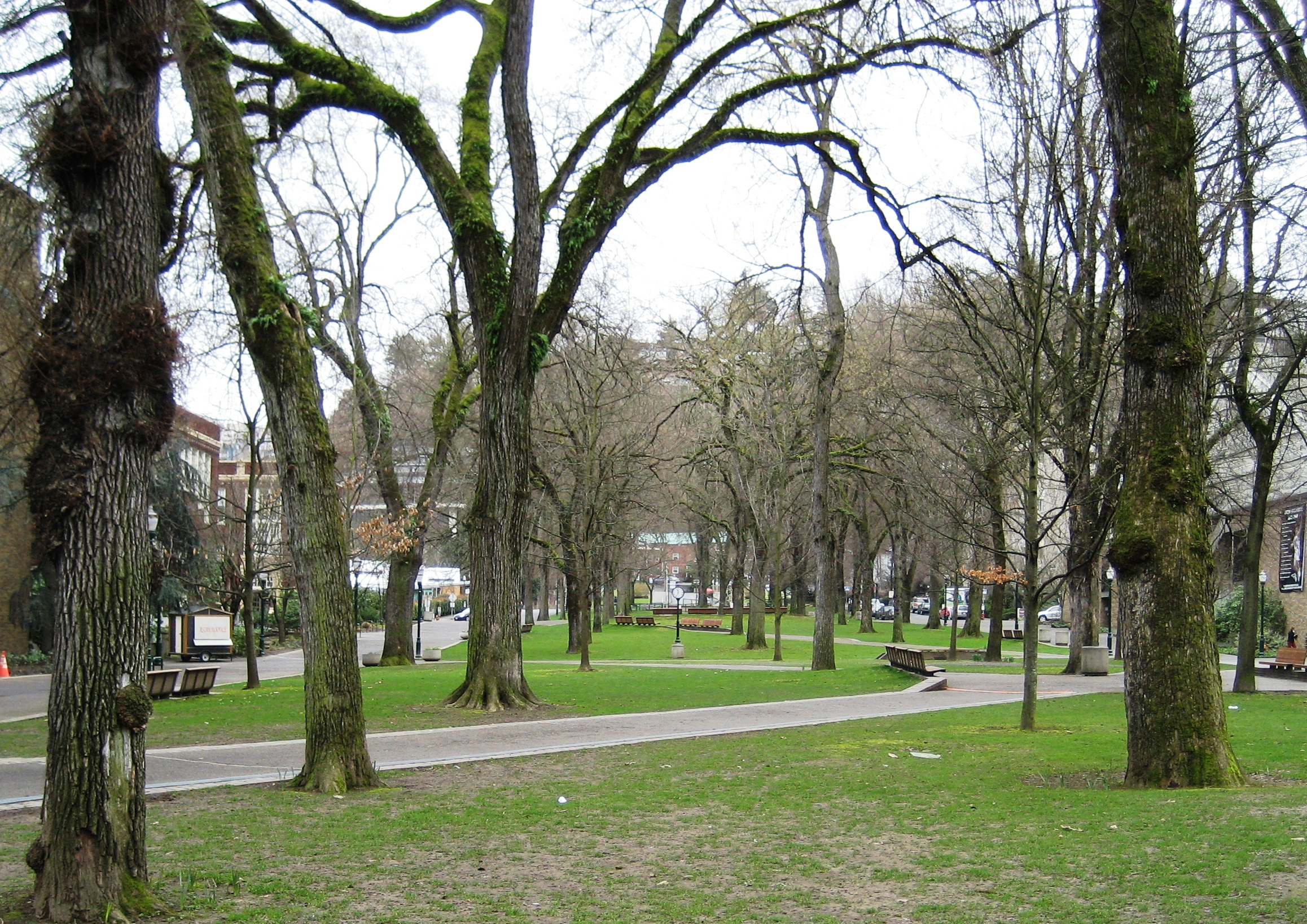
- Part of the South Park Blocks in 2009
- Interactive map of South Park Blocks
- Type: Urban park
- Location: Portland, Oregon
- Coordinates: 45°30′45″N 122°41′06″W
- Area: 8.76 acres (3.55 ha)
- Operator: Portland Parks & Recreation
- Status: Open 5 am to 9 pm daily
- South Park Blocks
- U.S. National Register of Historic Places
- U.S. Historic district
- NRHP reference No.: 100007518
- Added to NRHP: March 23, 2022

The South Park Blocks form a city park in downtown Portland, Oregon. The Oregonian has called it Portland's "extended family room", as Pioneer Courthouse Square is known as Portland's "living room".

Twelve blocks in length, it is intersected by the Portland Streetcar and forms the Portland Cultural District and the greenspace at the center of Portland State University. The New York Times stated the blocks are "literally at the heart of the city's cultural life." Public artworks in the park include Shemanski Fountain (1926), In the Shadow of the Elm, Peace Chant, (1984), Alexander Phimister Proctor's Theodore Roosevelt, Rough Rider, and a statue of Abraham Lincoln. The park also contains approximately 337 elm, oak, and maple trees valued at $3.4 million, as well as roses. A plaque from the Lang Syne Society was placed in the South Park Blocks at Jefferson Street in 1991, commemorating the Great Plank Road. The property was added to the National Register of Historic Places in 2022.

== History ==
=== Continuous Park Blocks ===
Portland was platted in 1845, then Daniel H. Lownsdale purchased land south and west of the original platting. He drew up a plat in 1848 that included 11 narrow blocks, 100 feet (30 m) × 200 feet (61 m), instead of the standard 200 feet (61 m) × 200 feet (61 m). He then brought on Stephen Coffin and William W. Chapman as partners, and dedicated the South Park Blocks and midtown park blocks in 1852. This made them the first official greenspace in Portland. While they were dedicated to the city, they weren't owned by the city until September 22, 1870, when Mayor Bernard Goldsmith and Chapman agreed on selling the South Park Blocks and the two Plaza Blocks (Chapman and Lownsdale Squares) to the city for $6,250. Most of the purchase price was for the Plaza Blocks, since the park blocks were at the edge of the developed city.

Ownership of the continuous park blocks was not without dispute, however. After Lownsdale died without a will, and then his wife Nancy died, his estate challenged that his plat didn't require the central section to be dedicated to public use since Nancy had not signed over legal title to the land. The courts agreed in 1865. Benjamin Stark reneged on the donation of two north central park blocks to the city, instead offering to sell them for $138,000. Captain John H. Couch deeded his section, which became the North Park Blocks to the city on January 25, 1865, only ten days after receiving the federal patent for the land. Six of the South Park Blocks were lost to private parties in the 1870s, and elected city officials were unwilling to spend the asking price of $6,000 per block to purchase them so soon after the city had bought the land for Washington Park. Only a year later, a proposal to acquire the six blocks for $92,000 was brought by the city council, showing the increase in prices in that year.

A 1907 tax bond issue was brought to the voters. It would have been a $2 million bond, likely including money to buy back the blocks. The measure failed, and some time later, the street name changed from "West Park" to Southwest 9th". Two missing blocks have been recaptured since then: O'Bryant Square was purchased in 1973, and Director Park opened in 2009.

== Residential park blocks ==
By the late 1870s, the Park Blocks near the current location of Portland State University were fronted by formal Italianate mansions.

By the 1920s, the central park blocks were home to the 12-story Stevens Building and the 9-story Woodlark Building, as well as six or more hotels. Edward H. Bennett proposed making the Park Blocks continuous in 1912, part of his "Greater Portland Plan". Otherwise, the next spark was the conversion of one central park block into O'Bryant Square in 1972. The next block to be reclaimed was Director Park, dedicated as a park in 2009, inspired by a 1995 plan to turn the block into a 12-story parking lot.

In 1933, the area surrounding Skidmore Fountain was "tawdry" and nearly neglected, and there was an effort to move the fountain to the South Park Blocks. This did not happen.

After a 1990 Dutch elm disease outbreak in Portland, including one diseased tree at Park and Market in the South Park Blocks, the elm trees have been immunized with Tiabendazole. Portland's first outbreak of Dutch elm disease occurred in 1976 at Overlook Park, and the peak infections were in 2003.

=== Events ===
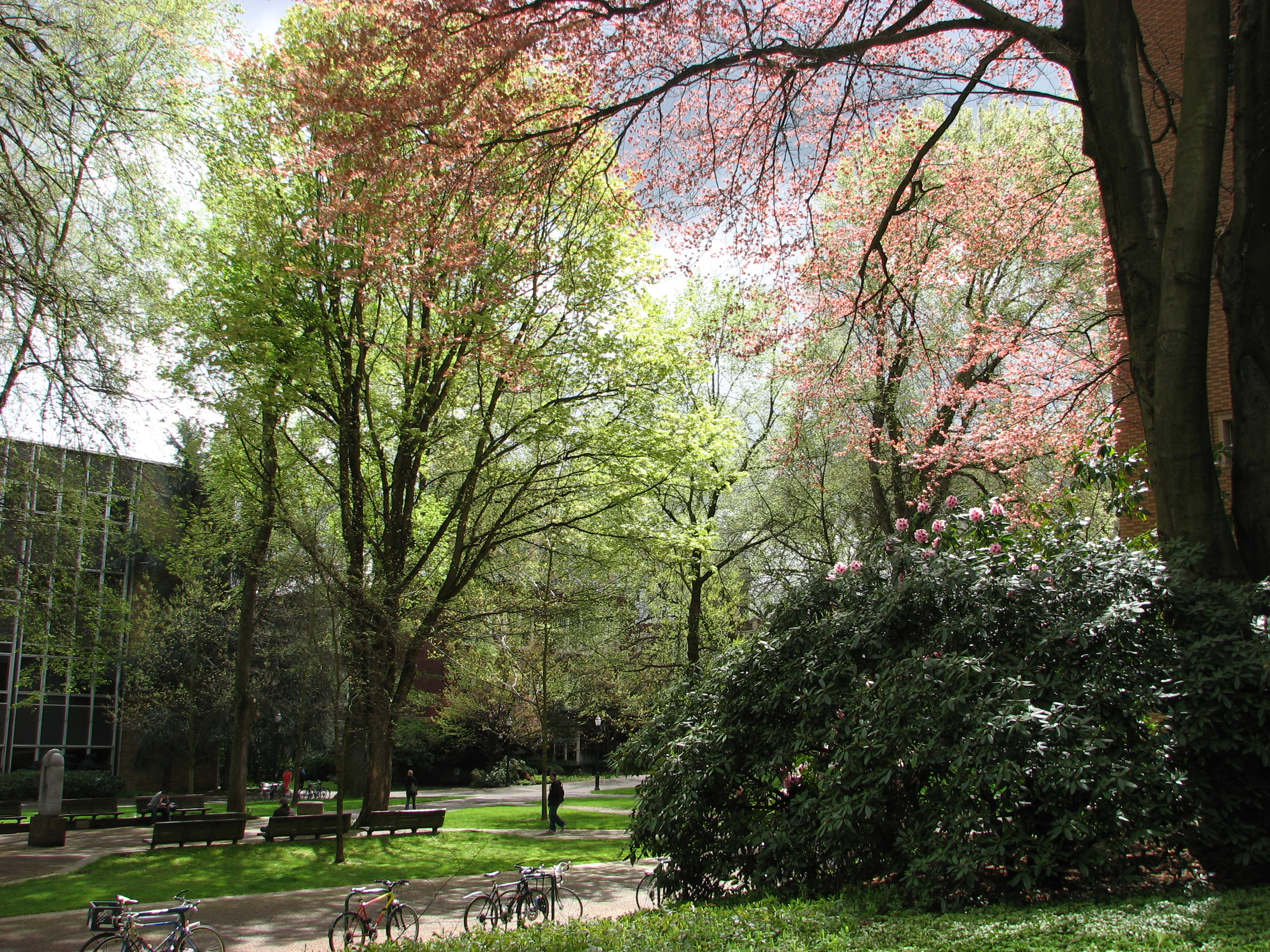
The South Park Blocks run through the central campus of Portland State University.

On May 5, 1918, the dedication of the Vista House at Crown Point began with a parade of cars from the South Park Blocks, on the newly completed Historic Columbia River Highway.

The Portland Rose Festival began and was located in and around the South Park Blocks in 1936, but were outgrowing the blocks by the 1950s. Residents sued to prohibit the Rose Festival from using the parks and lost. By 2007, the festival was relocated to Tom McCall Waterfront Park.

The first Earth Day, on April 22, 1970, was celebrated with a fair on the blocks. In 1975, the Portland city council held Portland's first gay pride fair along the park. It was moved to Tom McCall Waterfront Park the following year. The Seattle to Portland Bicycle Classic, known as STP, concluded in the South Park Blocks from 1979 to 1998, then moved to Cathedral Park. In 1997–1999, Tony n' Tina's Wedding, an interactive theatre, took place using the park as the stage; the wedding was held at the First Unitarian Church and later at the Oregon History Center, and the reception was held at the Portland Art Museum, being a "little street theater" on the park blocks.

After the September 11 attacks, the Park Blocks filled with a candlelight vigil and a memorial concert by the Oregon Symphony, which was free in the Arlene Schnitzer Concert Hall and was also broadcast into the blocks.

On December 3, 2011, Occupy Portland established camp in the South Park Blocks.

Other events have included Artquake, an art festival that attracted 200,000 people on Labor Day weekends in the Park Blocks from 1982 until at least 2003 and based on an art show that began in July 1949, a 1983 protest against U.S. nuclear missiles placed in Europe (3,000 protesters), an Oregon Public Employees Union strike in 1987, a rally with presidential candidate Michael Dukakis in 1988, Shakespeare in the Parks in 1989, a 1990 rally to pay tribute to Mulugeta Seraw, killed in Portland by white power skinheads in 1988, which had 1,500 people with 150 police officers defending against skinheads, and the Homowo Festival of African Arts held from 1990 to at least 2004. Lara Flynn Boyle filmed scenes from The Temp in the South Park Blocks in 1992, and The Hunted was filmed partially in the South Park Blocks in 2003, including a crash scene by Benicio del Toro.

In celebration of Harley-Davidson's 100th anniversary in 2003, an event called Rose City Thunder was held in the South Park blocks, to send riders off for the "Harley-Davidson 100th Anniversary Ride Home". Two appeals seeking a venue change were held prior to the event, but the city council rejected them, with City Commissioner Jim Francesconi stating "We don't discriminate against groups, period. That's the rules and that's what we abide by." Featuring live music, beer gardens, and thousands of people, it led to questions about why the residential Park Blocks were used, rather than a venue such as Tom McCall Waterfront Park. An editorial in The Oregonian stated the celebration was "more potbelly than pot smoking", but held the loud exhausts, public address systems, and rows of portable toilets weren't appreciated in a neighborhood setting. Organizers estimated 15,000 visitors, plus 2,000 motorcycles attended.

In 2006, because of the implosion of the cooling tower at Trojan Nuclear Power Plant, a group got together in the South Park Blocks and brought down a 25-foot (7.6 m) model tower to celebrate the implosion.

More events included a pro-choice march, rally, and workshops in 1989 with 2700 to 7500 attendees, a Tiananmen Square anniversary memorial ceremony in 1990, the "Earth Fair" (celebrating Earth Day, held in at least 1990 and 1991; 1990 saw 15,000–20,000 visitors in the rain), a 1991 Fourth of July parade to honor returnees from Operation Desert Storm (called the Defenders of Liberty Welcome Home Parade), the Potluck in the Park homeless meal (held from 1991 until 1996, when it was moved to O'Bryant Square), a 1,000-strong rally for Rodney King on May 2, 1992, the Oregon Trailfest, a 1993 celebration of the Oregon Trail (including an authentic encampment with teepees and wagons), Portland's first Critical Mass, held on September 24, 1993 with 100 cyclists in the South Park Blocks, the Portland Arts Festival (part of the Portland Rose Festival) held in 1998 through at least 2006, a gun control rally in 2000, the 2,000 people (which included the Million Mom March) for the Amala Peace Walk in 2000, welcoming the Dalai Lama, an AIDS Walk in September 2000, the "PDX AIDS Day Promise Vigil" at Shemanski Fountain to mark World AIDS Day in 2006, a campaign rally and speech by Al Gore in October 2000, the Twilight Criterium from 2002 to 2006 (attracting 10,000 spectators, moved in 2007 to the North Park Blocks due to construction), a protest by about 150 people against the use of deadly force by Portland Police in a racially motivated traffic stop, a march of grandmothers and mothers on Mother's Day 2004 titled "Mothers Acting Up", a reading of Pablo Neruda's poetry on the 100th anniversary of his birth (July 2004), a protest with 150 people to "mourn for the loss of our country" in November 2004 when John Kerry lost the 2004 presidential election, a celebration of the Oregon State Quarter's launch in 2005, a parade titled "Procession for the Future" for "climate stabilization and ecological well-being", "worker dignity", "think outside the (water) bottle", "just security and global justice", as well as costumed George W. Bush, Dick Cheney, and Condoleezza Rice "dressed as jailbirds" held on March 4, 2008.

Other events have been held, including the Park Block Revels (held from 1972 to at least 1992), the Oregon Historical Society's Holiday Cheer and Authors Party, the Portland Poetry Festival (held from 1972 to at least 1992), Shakespeare-in-the-Park by the Portland Actors Ensemble, the Meier & Frank Holiday Parade (held from 1988 on), the Downtown Community Association's Ice Cream Social (held from 1990 to at least 1992), Carifest, a party by the Caribbean Cultural Association, held from 1996 until at least 2003, and PeaceQuake, "an event focused on refugee experiences and alternatives to war", held by Oregon Physicians for Social Responsibility in at least September 2002 and 2003. In 2008, a local resident was known for wheeling her piano down an elevator and 1.5 blocks to the Park Blocks, setting it up and playing "Chopin under the trees." The Bicycle Transportation Alliance hosted a breakfast to support Bike to Work Month in May 2009.

A portion of the park typically hosts the summer commencement ceremony for Portland State University students. In 2008, 550 students participated in the ceremony, and it was held rain or shine. PSU also hosts an annual Party in the Park every fall after the school year begins.

==== Portland Farmers Market ====
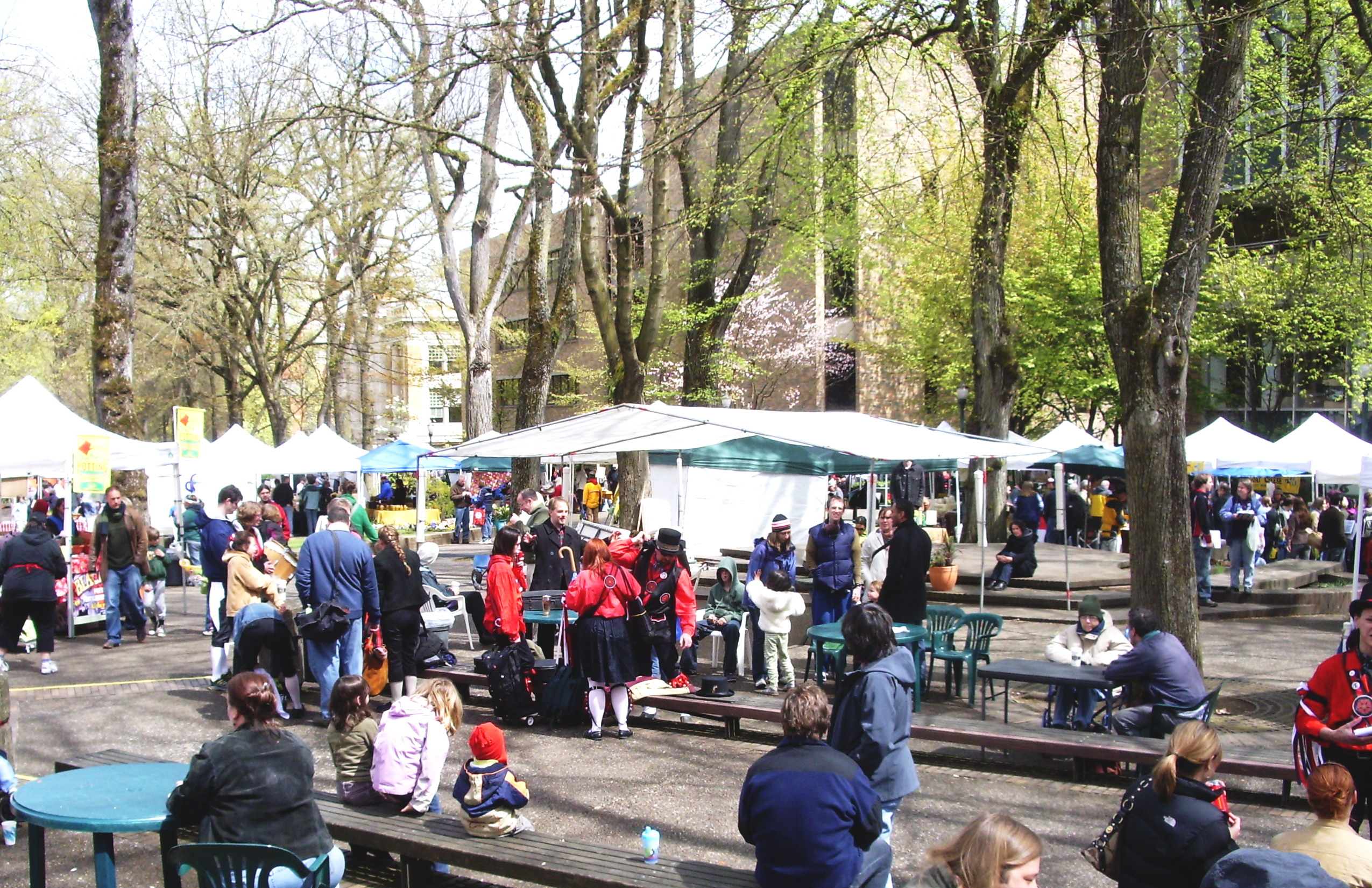
Portland Farmers Market in the South Park Blocks

The primary Portland Farmers Market location, held in the South Park Blocks every Saturday from March to December attracts up to 14,000 people per weekend to the local food booths. It was originally held at Broadway and Naito beginning in 1992, but moved to the Park Blocks in 1998. A smaller market is held at the north end of the blocks on Wednesdays, and was held in Pioneer Courthouse Square until 1998.

The Saturday South Park Blocks location has been very popular, and has been credited with helping "make the city a national food destination". Beginning in March 2009, dogs were banned from the market, due to "some unfortunate incidents with dogs – tripping people, urinating on food, snatching muffins out of kids' hands". Other satellite locations still allow pets. The Saturday location was doubled in size for the 2010 season.

==== Protests ====
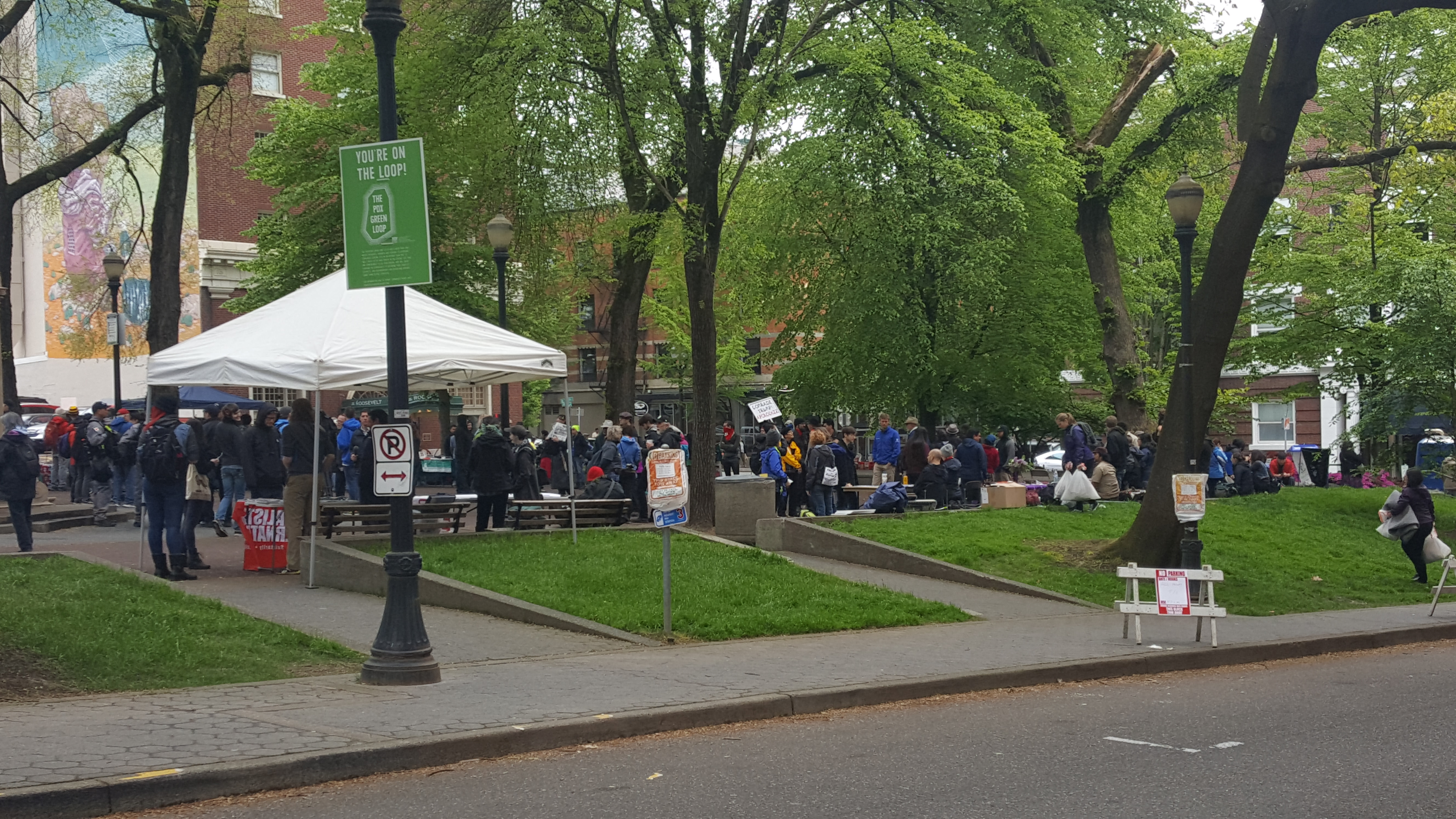
May Day rally in the park in 2017

The South Park Blocks, especially near Portland State University, have been home to protests and marches. In May 1970, there was a Vietnam War protest held in the park blocks, held in response to the invasion of Cambodia and the Kent State Shootings. Strikers barricaded streets surrounding the university and Park Blocks, causing them to become car-free, as they are now. Due in part to the Kent State Shootings on May 4, and 134 faculty members who had formally joined the strike, Portland State University was forced to close from May 6 to 11. By May 6, the protesters formed an underground newspaper, called the Wallposter, and had four demands: "U.S. out of S.E. Asia now; troops, cops off campus; free Bobby Seale; detoxify nerve gas." Posters with a logo were printed in the PSU Smith Center cafeteria, but protesters were evicted from the area by May 7 after a "wild, all-night party". On May 11, police officers charged protesters and forcibly removed a symbolic hospital tent (a geodesic dome) placed on the blocks. 28 protesters were injured and taken to area hospitals, and four police officers were injured. Lawsuits following the protest led to Portland Police agreeing to never use force against non-violent protesters in the future.

A workers' rights protest on May 1, 2000, organized by the May Day Coalition, gathered 300–400 people. Police chief Mark Kroeker said 19 people, some "dressed like anarchists and (carrying) gas masks" were arrested, and Portland Police used bean bag rounds, with fears of repeating the 1999 WTO riots in Seattle unless sufficient force was shown early. The police declared emergency at 3:45 pm after a lit newspaper box was thrown at officers, then the police corralled the marchers into a smaller space with mounted officers and ordered them to disperse. A protest march against the police action was held on May 4, 2000, stating that the show of force was excessive and contrary to the city's community policing ethos. 23 complaints of excessive police force led to a large citywide hearing on June 28, 2000. The 2009 May Day rally, supporting immigration reform, attracted 1500 people.

In 2006, approximately 1,200 protesters, primarily Latino high-school age students joined by Jobs with Justice, took part in the 2006 United States immigration reform protests. In 2007, 15,000 protesters of all ages began a rally and march as part of the March 17, 2007 anti-war protest, including local activists affiliated with the radical Students for a Democratic Society. After a fringe group broke off from the protest and burned a US soldier in effigy, Michelle Malkin stated that "Portland hates America." The Drudge Report, Lars Larson, and conservative blogs also commented on the effigy, and protest organizers with the American Friends Service Committee stated "We had a massive, peaceful demonstration against the killing and destruction going on every day in Iraq, a positive experience for thousands of people from different walks of life, and apparently the right-wing fringe is going to pick up that little portion."

Many protests and marches have been held in response to the 2003 invasion of Iraq. There were several anti-war rallies in 2001 through 2003, including 20,000 at a January 18, 2003 rally, and 20,000–45,000 for the March 15, 2003 rally. Groups broke off from the protest to block roads and the Morrison Bridge; these splinter groups were broken up by the police. John Lewis spoke at the rally.

Approximately 15,000 people protested the fourth anniversary of the war (March 2007). For the fifth anniversary, the Iraq Body Count Exhibit placed red and white flags in the South Park Blocks, signifying who had died between the Americans and Iraqis. There was a large fifth-anniversary protest and parade against the Iraq war ("thousands of protesters", March 2008), and a high school student protest against the war was held in March 2008, with 400 protesters.

=== Pedestrian access and renewal ===
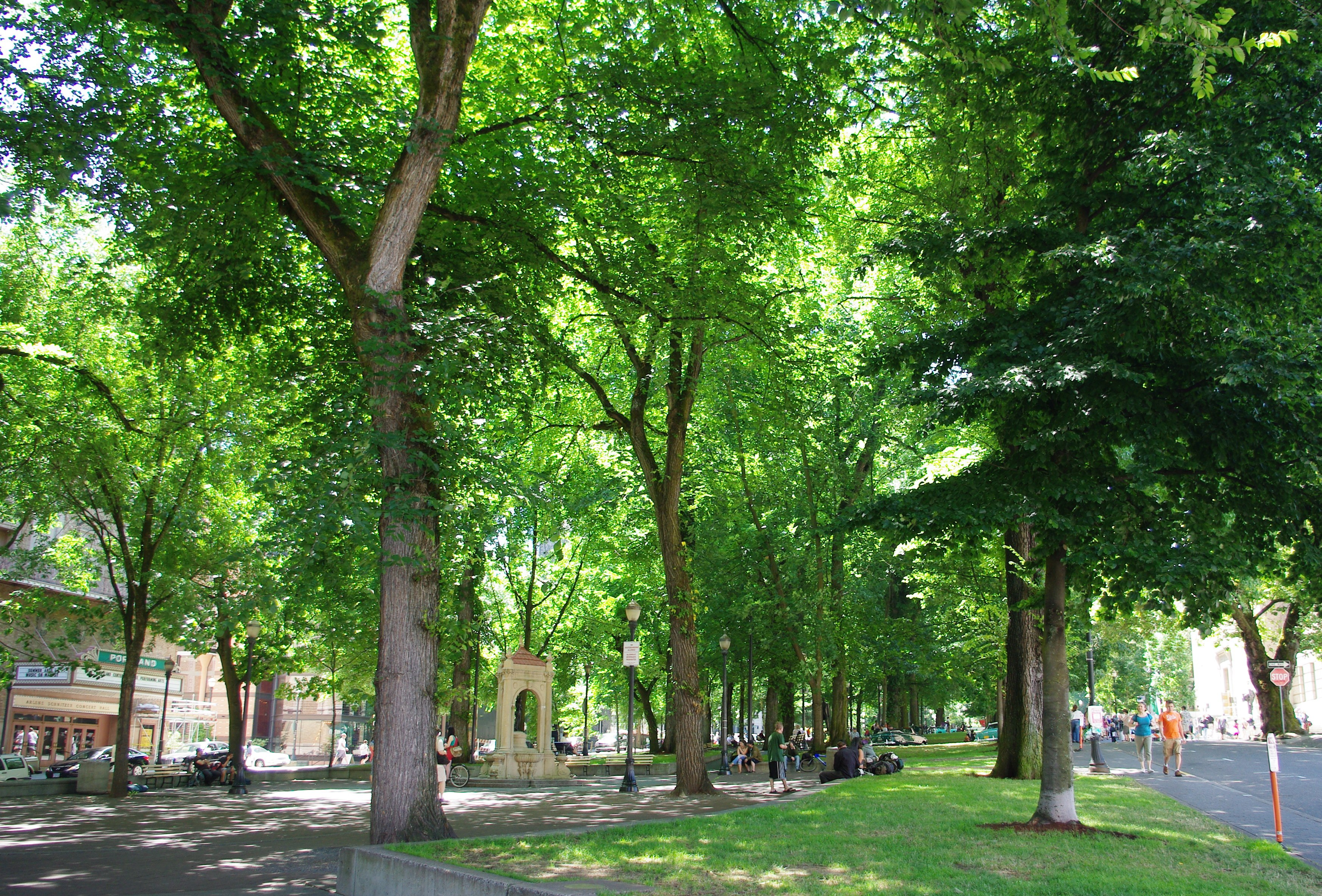
Blocks at Salmon Street

The southern end of the South Park Blocks were closed to cars in 1973, removing traffic from the blocks and the center of the university.

The area was the focus of a Portland Development Commission urban renewal based on a 1982 master plan, becoming an urban renewal district in 1985, and expiring in July 2008. The park blocks underwent serious renovations in 1987, adding plazas, large flower beds, lighting and irrigation, and newly paved sidewalks. Several apartment complexes specifically aimed at the middle class were built, including the University Park Apartments (125 units, $10.5 million, quickly sold and converted to condos), South Park Square Apartments (184 units, $16 million, completed May 1988), and Tom Mesher's Gallery Park Apartments (31 units, $3 million). In 1987, the New Theater Building of the Portland Center for the Performing Arts was completed immediately next door to the Arlene Schnitzer Concert Hall. The South Park Blocks Association, a commercial and institutional association, was started at that time, to attract residents and consumers to the area and to address security concerns. In March 2022, the property was listed to the National Register of Historic Places as a historic district.

=== Crime ===
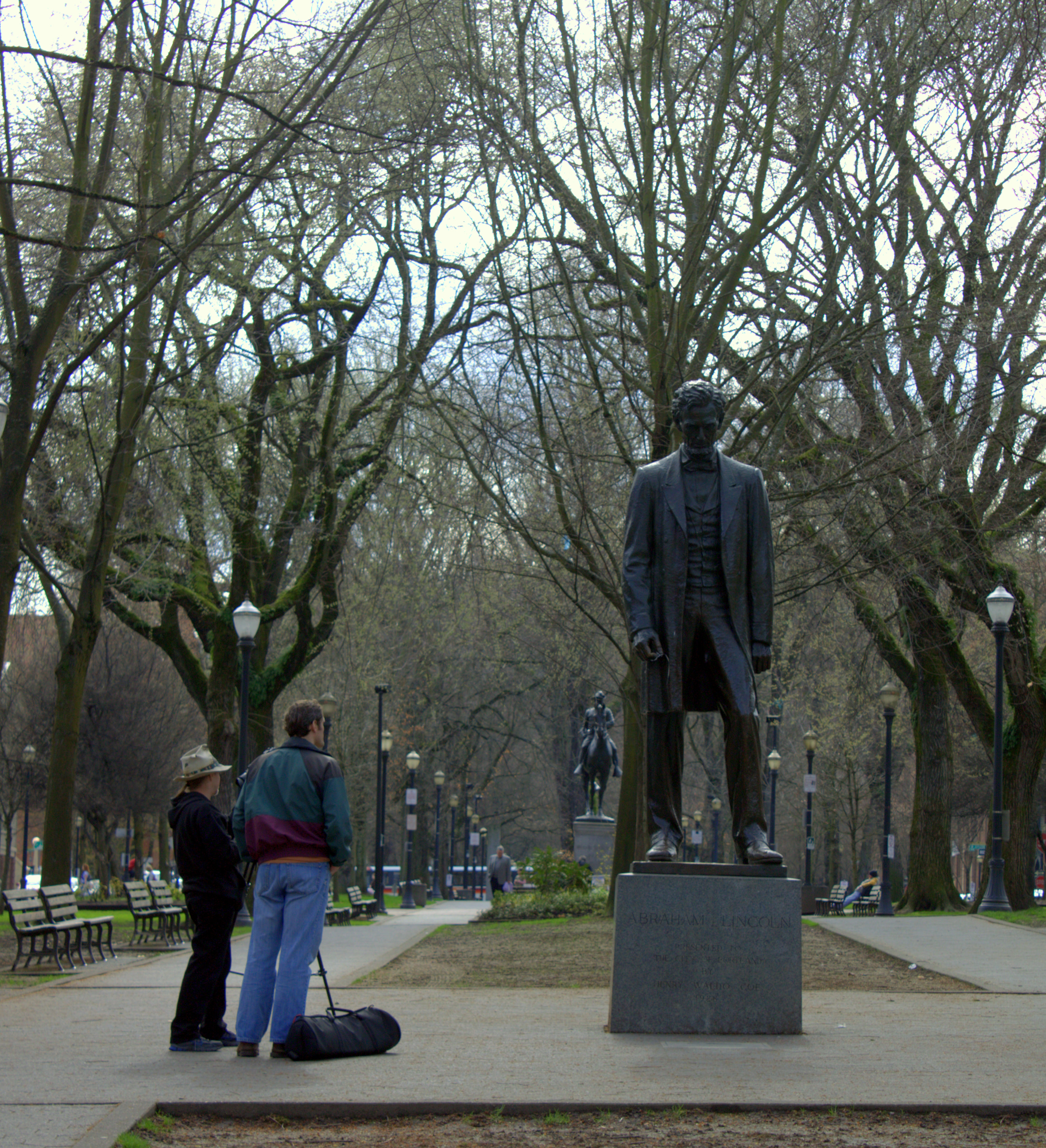
The statue of Abraham Lincoln

A report in 1990 said the blocks were being "held hostage" by the homeless, mainly "aggressive panhandlers, stumbling drunks, violent drug users and the unpredictable mentally ill." Reports in the mid-1990s said "Downtown Portland had become a drug supermarket", with "marijuana and LSD ... being dealt openly in the South Park Blocks," and that the South Park Blocks, especially near the Lincoln statue, were home to "The Park People", who littered, used drugs, and damaged property. Youth reported they had moved to the South Park Blocks because they had been kicked out of Pioneer Courthouse Square and O'Bryant Square. A child molester known as "Krusty the Troll" who preyed on homeless teens in the South Park Blocks, was charged with 79 counts of sex crimes in 1996. There was a major police sweep of the Park Blocks in 1996 for ordinances such as sitting on the Abraham Lincoln statue, marijuana possession, littering, and loud radios.

Downtown crime was down 30 percent from 1996 to 2003, and down 7 percent from 2004 to 2005. Due to crime, Mayor Tom Potter declared a 9 pm curfew in 2005, stating walking is allowed, but "no one will be allowed to loiter, harass visitors or use the park as their personal camp." The Oregonian stated the curfew was due to a "verbally aggressive" in the area, after the group was displaced from the Burnside Bridge by the Big Pipe Project. The curfew was still in effect in February 2006, when it was spread to other downtown parks, citing the reduction in drug dealing that was occurring in the South Park Blocks.

In 2006, students from the Art Institute of Portland used stencils to advertise a concert for the Oregon Food Bank. The students believed they were using spray chalk, but after completion, they learned they were actually using spray paint. The students were told that even temporary markings count as graffiti, and the students offered to remove the paint and apologize to businesses affected. Criminal charges were not filed.

As of 2024, community outreach programs operate in the park to provide food and supplies for drug use as a form of harm reduction.

== Notable places and public art ==
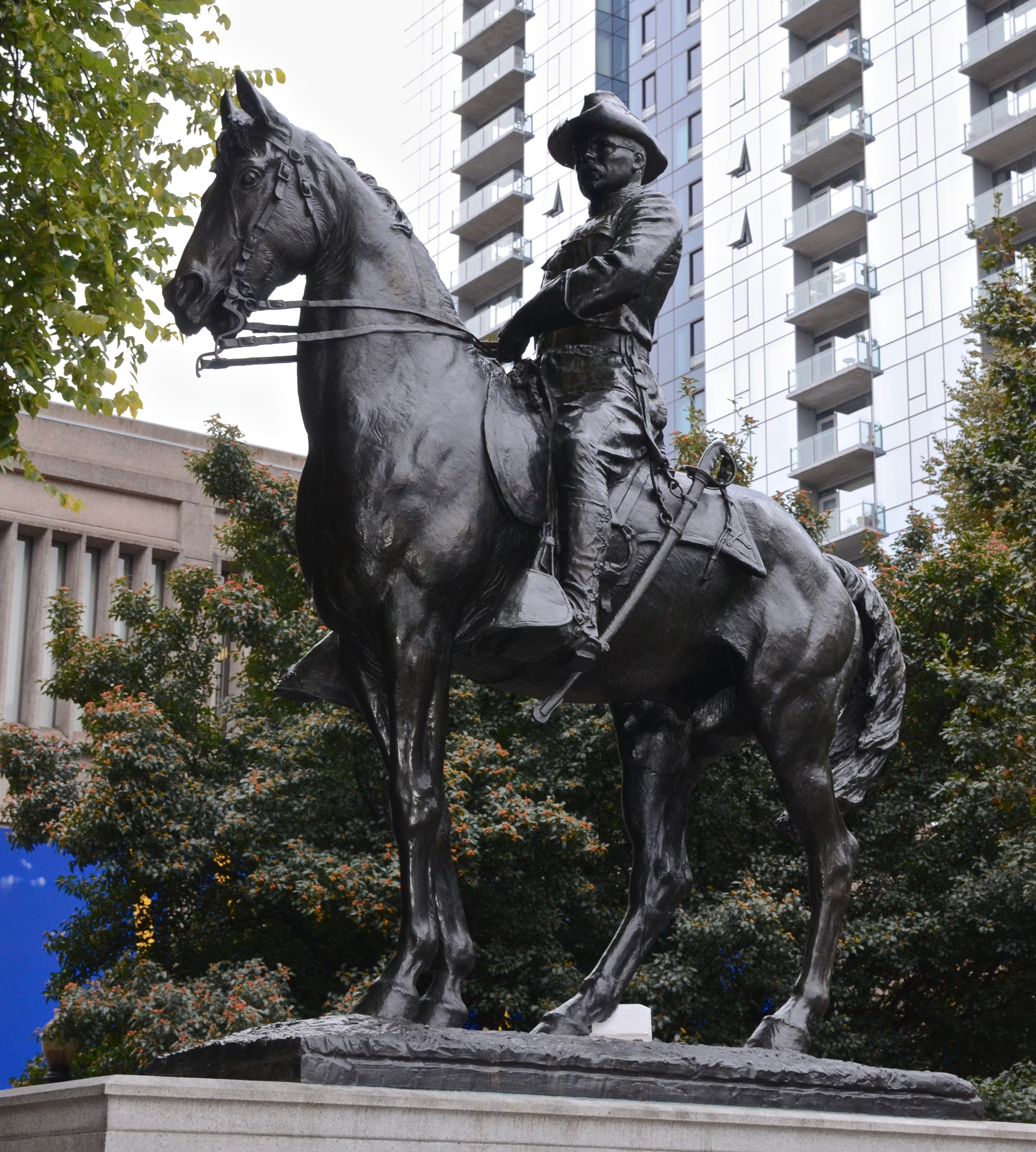
Alexander Phimister Proctor's Theodore Roosevelt, Rough Rider (1922) in 2016

Portland State University buildings near the park include the Peter Stott Center, Branford Price Millar Library, Lincoln Hall, and Ladd Carriage House. The Ladd Tower, Oregon Historical Society, Portland Art Museum, Arlene Schnitzer Concert Hall, and the Arlington Club are also nearby.

Every block contains public art, such as Shemanski Fountain (1926), designed by Carl L. Linde, with drinking wells, including special drinking wells for dogs. Other art includes Paul Sutinen's In the Shadow of the Elm (built into the pavement), and three large blocks of granite titled Peace Chant (1984). Two large statues are in the block: a $40,000, 18 feet (5.5 m) bronze equestrian statue called Theodore Roosevelt, Rough Rider, designed by Alexander Phimister Proctor, commissioned by Roosevelt's personal friend and Portlander Henry Waldo Coe and added in 1922, and one of Abraham Lincoln, "facing north, slump-shouldered and pensive", added in 1928, commissioned by Coe in 1926, sculpted by George Fife Waters.

== Notable residents ==
- Terence O'Donnell – author

== See also ==
- Farewell to Orpheus (1968–1973) by Frederic Littman
- Holon (sculpture)
- National Register of Historic Places listings in South and Southwest Portland, Oregon
