= 1984 in fine arts of the Soviet Union =

The year 1984 was marked by many events that left an imprint on the history of Soviet and Russian Fine Arts.

== Events ==
- Exhibition of Leningrad artists dedicated to the 40th Anniversary of the complete liberation of Leningrad from the enemy blockade was opened in the halls of the Leningrad Union of Artists. The participants were Victor Abramyan, Ivan Andreev, Evgenia Baykova, Andrei Bantikov, Nikolai Baskakov, Lev Bogomolets, Dmitry Buchkin, Alexander Gulajev, Krum Dzhakov, Alexei Eremin, Sergei Frolov, Elena Zhukova, Georgy Kalinkin, Boris Korneev, Elena Kostenko, Anna Kostrova, Boris Lavrenko, Oleg Lomakin, Alexander Lubimov, Dmitry Maevsky, Vladimir Malagis, Gavriil Malish, Evgeny Maltsev, Piotr Nazarov, Yuri Neprintsev, Yaroslav Nikolaev, Ludmila Ronchevskaya, Arseny Semionov, Igor Skorobogatov, Georgy Tatarnikov, Nikolai Timkov, Mikhail Tkachev, Yuri Tulin, Anatoli Vasiliev, Gleb Verner, Nikolai Volodimirov, Ruben Zakharian, and other important Leningrad artists.
- Exhibition of works by Isaak Brodsky (1884–1939) dedicated to 100-year Anniversary was opened in the Museum of the Academy of Arts in Leningrad.
- A Monument to Dmitry Mendeleev was unveiled in Tobolsk. Authors of the monument sculptor V. Nikiforov.
- Exhibition of works by Marina Kozlovskaya was opened in the Leningrad Union of Artists.
- Exhibition of works by Alexander Samokhvalov (1894–1971) dedicated to 90th Anniversary was opened in the Leningrad Union of Artists.
- Exhibition of works by Maria Zubreeva and Sergei Zakharov was opened in the Leningrad Union of Artists.

== Deaths ==
- March 27 – Anatoli Kazantsev (Russian: Казанцев Анатолий Алексеевич), Russian soviet painter, graphic artist and art educator, Honored Art worker of Russian Federation (born 1908).
- May 3 – Boris Kotik (Russian: Котик Борис Васильевич), Russian soviet painter and monumental artist (born 1921).
- June 20 – Lydia Gagarina (Russian: Гагарина Лидия Ивановна), Russian soviet painter and graphic artist (born 1902).
- June 23 – Alexander Semionov (Russian: Семёнов Александр Михайлович), Russian soviet painter (born 1922).
- November 22 – Nikolai Tomsky, (Russian: Томский Николай Васильевич), Russian soviet sculptor, People's Artist of the USSR, Stalin Prize winner, Lenin Prize winner, USSR State Prize winner, Hero of Socialist Labour (born 1900).
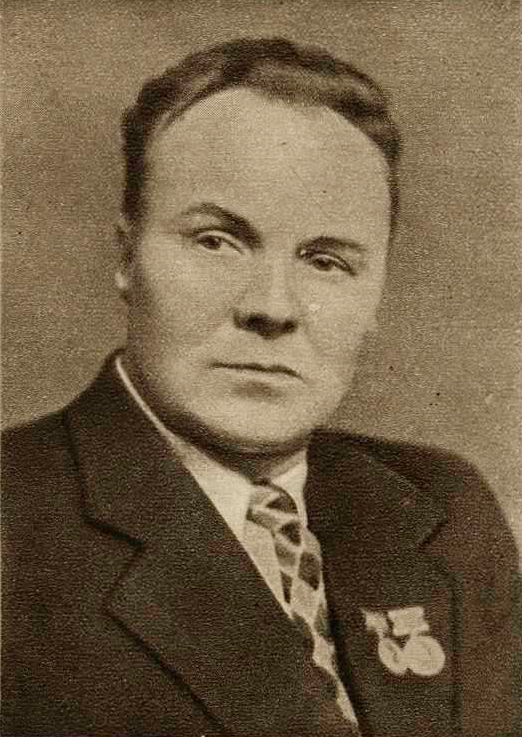
Nikolai Tomsky

== See also ==
- List of Russian artists
- List of painters of Leningrad Union of Artists
- Saint Petersburg Union of Artists
- Russian culture

== Sources ==
- Республиканская художественная выставка «Голубые просторы России». Живопись. Графика. Скульптура. Декоративно-прикладное и народное искусство. М., Министерство культуры РСФСР, 1984.
- «Подвигу Ленинграда посвящается». Выставка произведений ленинградских художников, посвященная 40-летию полного освобождения Ленинграда от вражеской блокады. Каталог. Л., Художник РСФСР, 1989.
- Бродский Исаак Израилевич. 1884—1939. Каталог выставки.. Л., Искусство, 1984.
- Марина Андреевна Козловская. Каталог выставки. Л., Художник РСФСР, 1984.
- Иосиф Натанович Зисман. Выставка произведений. Каталог. Л., Художник РСФСР, 1984.
- Андрей Алексеевич Яковлев. Ленинградские километры БАМа. Каталог выставки. Л., Художник РСФСР, 1984.
- Самохвалов Александр Николаевич. Выставка произведений. Каталог. Л., Художник РСФСР, 1984.
- Татаренко Александр Александрович. Выставка произведений. Каталог. Л., Художник РСФСР, 1984.
- Дмитрий Петрович Бучкин. Выставка произведений. Каталог. Л., Художник РСФСР, 1984.
- Мария Авраамовна Зубреева. Сергей Ефимович Захаров. Выставка произведений. Каталог. Л., Художник РСФСР, 1984.
- Artists of Peoples of the USSR. Biography Dictionary. Vol. 1. Moscow, Iskusstvo, 1970.
- Artists of Peoples of the USSR. Biography Dictionary. Vol. 2. Moscow, Iskusstvo, 1972.
- Directory of Members of Union of Artists of USSR. Volume 1,2. Moscow, Soviet Artist Edition, 1979.
- Directory of Members of the Leningrad branch of the Union of Artists of Russian Federation. Leningrad, Khudozhnik RSFSR, 1980.
- Artists of Peoples of the USSR. Biography Dictionary. Vol. 4 Book 1. Moscow, Iskusstvo, 1983.
- Directory of Members of the Leningrad branch of the Union of Artists of Russian Federation. - Leningrad: Khudozhnik RSFSR, 1987.
- Artists of peoples of the USSR. Biography Dictionary. Vol. 4 Book 2. - Saint Petersburg: Academic project humanitarian agency, 1995.
- Link of Times: 1932 - 1997. Artists - Members of Saint Petersburg Union of Artists of Russia. Exhibition catalogue. - Saint Petersburg: Manezh Central Exhibition Hall, 1997.
- Matthew C. Bown. Dictionary of 20th Century Russian and Soviet Painters 1900-1980s. - London: Izomar, 1998.
- Vern G. Swanson. Soviet Impressionism. - Woodbridge, England: Antique Collectors' Club, 2001.
- Петр Фомин. Живопись. Воспоминания современников. СПб., 2002. С.107.
- Время перемен. Искусство 1960—1985 в Советском Союзе. СПб., Государственный Русский музей, 2006.
- Sergei V. Ivanov. Unknown Socialist Realism. The Leningrad School. - Saint-Petersburg: NP-Print Edition, 2007. - ISBN 5-901724-21-6, ISBN 978-5-901724-21-7.
- Anniversary Directory graduates of Saint Petersburg State Academic Institute of Painting, Sculpture, and Architecture named after Ilya Repin, Russian Academy of Arts. 1915 - 2005. - Saint Petersburg: Pervotsvet Publishing House, 2007.
