= Iron Law (painting) =

1984 painting by Odd Nerdrum

- Artist: Odd Nerdrum
- Year: 1983–1984
- Medium: Oil on canvas
- Dimensions: 210 cm × 272 cm (83 in × 107 in)
- Location: Private collection

Iron Law (Norwegian: Jernloven) is a 1984 painting by the Norwegian artist Odd Nerdrum. It depicts two men in a grey and desolate coastal landscape, as the man to the right—wearing a blindfold—is about to strike the man to the left with a metal rod. In the background, a third man is running away from the scene.

== Themes ==
Iron Law was among the works that inaugurated a new phase in Nerdrum's career, where the artist abandoned the contemporary, concrete settings of his 1970s works. The American critic Paul Cantor associated this with Friedrich Nietzsche's concept of master–slave morality: "His early paintings portray the modern world of slave morality; his later paintings portray an ancient world of master morality." Cantor wrote that Iron Law "seems to depict the emergence of the master–slave relationship, the moment when the slave acknowledges the master. (...) Nerdrum seems to be suggesting that society originates in an act of violent mastery."

== Legacy ==
The painting inspired the Norwegian black metal band Solefald to write the song "Jernlov". The song gave its title to the band's first demo in 1995 and is the first track on their 1997 debut album, The Linear Scaffold, which also uses a Nerdrum painting (Return of the Sun) for its cover art.
