= Tudor Arms Apartments =

Tudor Arms Apartments may refer to:

- Tudor Arms Apartments (Portland, Oregon), listed on the NRHP in Northwest Portland, Oregon
- Tudor Arms Apartments (Baltimore, Maryland), a historic cooperative apartment building in Wyman Park, Baltimore
- The Tudor Arms, also known as The Rae Flats and The Raleigh, historic apartment buildings in Buffalo, New York
