= List of memorials to Theodore Roosevelt =

Several memorials have been devoted to Theodore Roosevelt, the 26th president of the United States. Additionally, various groups have acted to preserve his legacy.

== Theodore Roosevelt Association ==
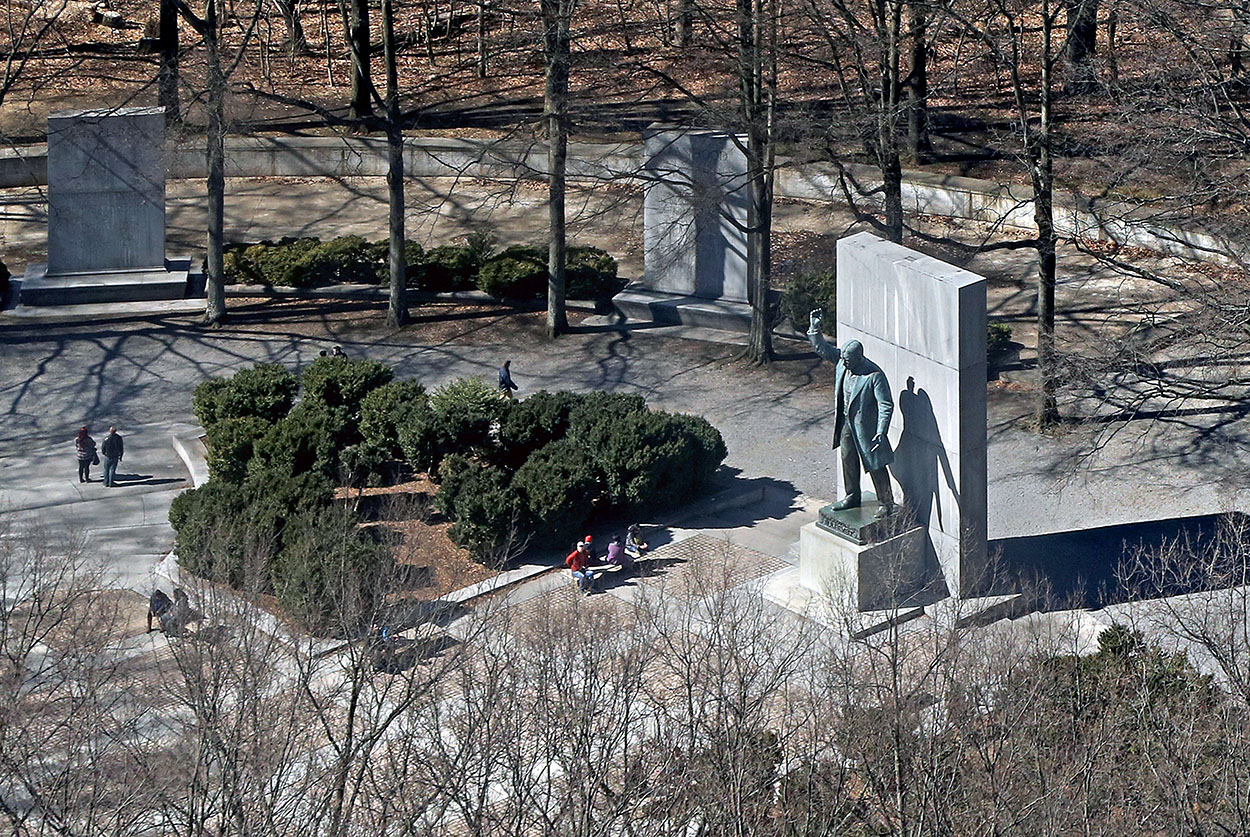
Theodore Roosevelt Island Memorial in December

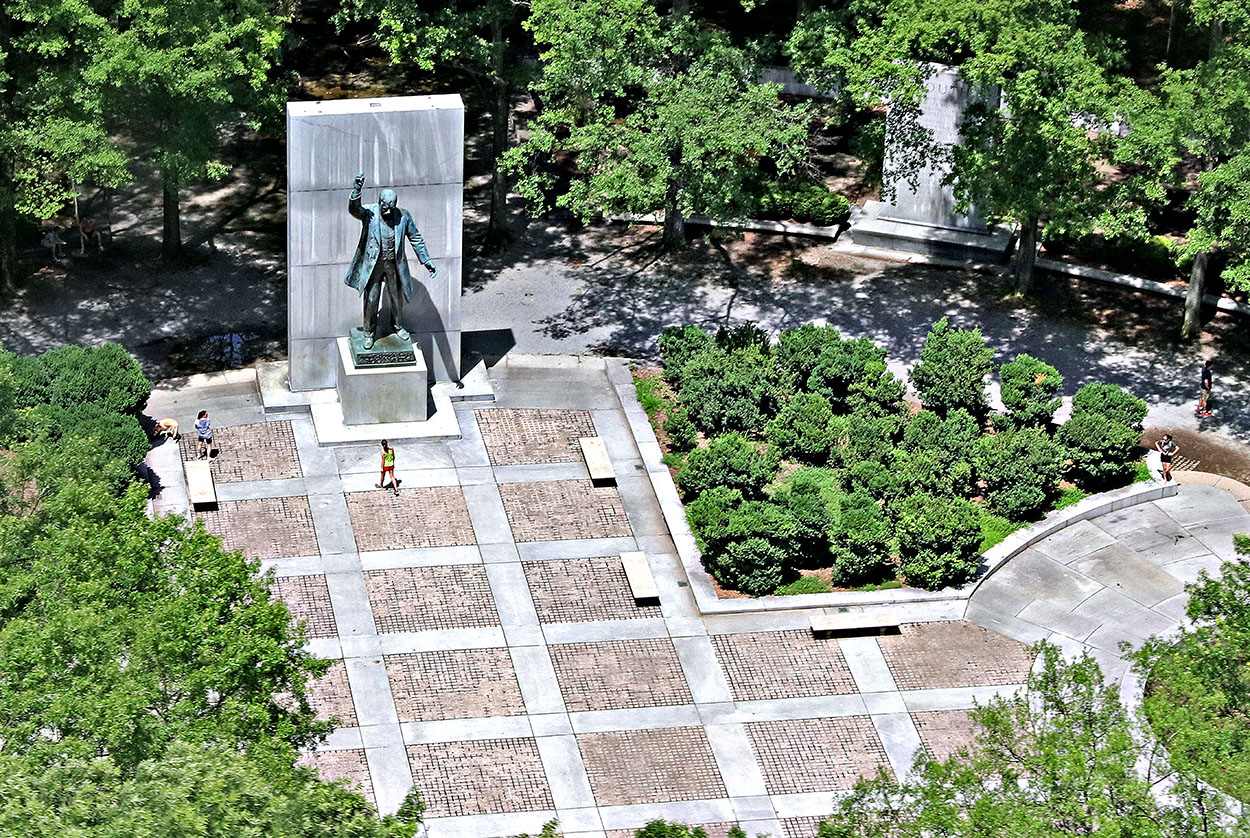
Theodore Roosevelt Island Memorial

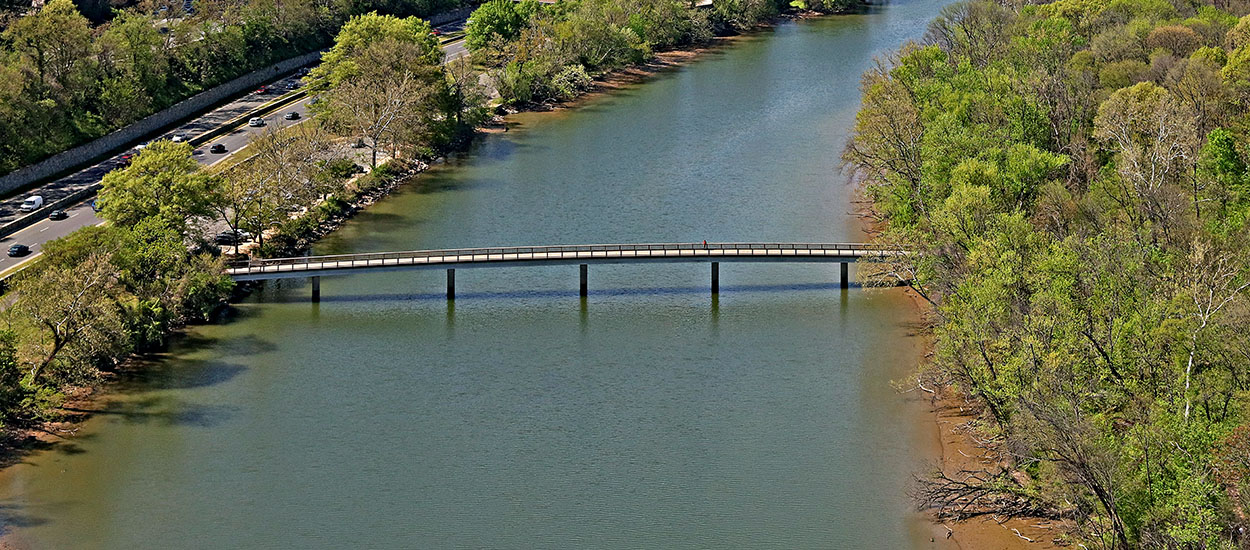
Pedestrian Bridge to Theodore Roosevelt Island

In 1919, the Theodore Roosevelt Association (originally known as the Permanent Memorial National Committee) was founded by friends and supporters of Roosevelt. Soon renamed the Roosevelt Memorial Association (RMA), it was chartered in 1920 under Title 36 of the United States Code. In parallel with the RMA was an organization for women, The Women's Theodore Roosevelt Association, that had been founded in 1919 by an act of the New York State Assembly. Both organizations merged in 1956 under the current name. This organization preserved Roosevelt's papers in a 20-year project, preserved his photos and established four public sites: the reconstructed Theodore Roosevelt Birthplace National Historic Site, New York City, dedicated in 1923 and donated to the National Park Service in 1963; Theodore Roosevelt Memorial Park, Oyster Bay, Long Island, New York, dedicated in 1928 and given to the people of Oyster Bay; Theodore Roosevelt Island in the Potomac River in Washington, D.C., given to the federal government in 1932; Sagamore Hill, Roosevelt's Oyster Bay home, opened to the public in 1953 and was donated to the National Park Service in 1963 and is now the Sagamore Hill National Historic Site.

== Another attempt at a presidential library ==
Dickinson State University in western North Dakota is attempting to create a presidential Library called the Theodore Roosevelt Center. It has pursued the mission of digitizing and archiving all of TR’s letters, diaries, photographs, political cartoons, audio and video recordings, as well as other media. In 2013, the North Dakota legislature appropriated $12 million to build an actual complex similar to the official libraries run by the National Archives. As of May 2017, the physical library is expected to be completed in 2019.

== List of memorials ==
=== Communities ===
- Roosevelt, Georgia
- Roosevelt, Missouri
- Roosevelt, New York

=== Counties ===
- Roosevelt County, Montana
- Roosevelt County, New Mexico

=== Lakes and dams ===
- Theodore Roosevelt Dam (Arizona)
- Theodore Roosevelt Lake (Arizona)

=== Military vessels ===
- USS Theodore Roosevelt (ID-1478), troop transport in commission 1918–1919.
- USS Theodore Roosevelt (SSBN-600), in commission 1961–1982.
- USS Theodore Roosevelt (CVN-71), was commissioned in 1986 (San Diego, CA)

=== Parks and forests ===
- Roosevelt National Forest
- Theodore Roosevelt Birthplace National Historic Site (New York City)
- Theodore Roosevelt Memorial Park
- Theodore Roosevelt National Park (North Dakota)

=== Roads and bridges ===
- Roosevelt Boulevard in Philadelphia
- Roosevelt Road from Chicago to the Western Suburbs.
- Theodore Roosevelt Bridge on the Potomac River
- Theodore Roosevelt International Highway, an early 20th-century auto trail that ran from Portland, Oregon to Portland, Maine.

=== Schools ===
- Theodore Roosevelt College and Career Academy, Gary, Indiana; formerly known as Theodore Roosevelt High School
- Theodore Roosevelt High School (Fresno)
- Theodore Roosevelt High School (Los Angeles)
- Theodore Roosevelt High School (Colorado)
- Roosevelt Senior High School (Washington, DC)
- President Theodore Roosevelt High School, Honolulu, Hawaii
- Theodore Roosevelt High School (Chicago)
- Theodore Roosevelt High School (Des Moines), Des Moines, Iowa
- Theodore Roosevelt High School (Wyandotte), Wyandotte, Michigan
- Roosevelt High School (Minneapolis)
- Roosevelt High School (St. Louis)
- Theodore Roosevelt High School (New York City)
- Theodore Roosevelt High School (Yonkers, New York)
- Roosevelt High School (Dayton, Ohio)
- Theodore Roosevelt High School (Kent, Ohio)
- Roosevelt High School (South Dakota)
- Theodore Roosevelt High School (San Antonio), San Antonio, Texas
- Roosevelt High School (Seattle)
- Theodore Roosevelt Elementary School (Kingsport, Tennessee)

=== Sculptures ===
- Equestrian Rough Rider (Oyster Bay, New York)
- Equestrian Statue of Theodore Roosevelt (Minot, North Dakota)
- Theodore Roosevelt, Rough Rider (statue removed by demonstrators, Portland, Oregon)
- Theodore Roosevelt Memorial (Portland, Oregon)
- Theodore Roosevelt Monument (Tenafly, New Jersey)

=== Other ===
- Roosevelt River, Brazil
- Roosevelt Room, in the White House
- Roosevelt Study Center, Dickinson State University (DSU), ND
- Theodore Roosevelt Award
- Theodore Roosevelt Association, Oyster Bay, NY
- Theodore Roosevelt Digital Library, DSU, ND
- Theodore Roosevelt Inaugural National Historic Site, Buffalo, NY
- Theodore Roosevelt Island, Washington, D.C.
- Theodore Roosevelt United States Courthouse
- In the America the Beautiful Quarters series, Roosevelt is on the Theodore Roosevelt N.P. Quarter
- Along with three other presidents, Roosevelt appears on Mount Rushmore
- Minor planet 188693 Roosevelt

== See also ==
- Presidential memorials in the United States
