= Camlin =

Camlin may refer to:

- Camlin Hotel, in Seattle, Washington
- River Camlin, Irish river
- Camlin, County Antrim, a townland and civil parish in County Antrim, Northern Ireland
- Kokuyo Camlin, an Indian stationery company
- Charlie Camlin, an American Anglican bishop
