= American Apartment Building =

Historic building in Portland, Oregon, U.S.

- U.S. National Register of Historic Places
- U.S. Historic district – Contributing property
- Portland Historic Landmark
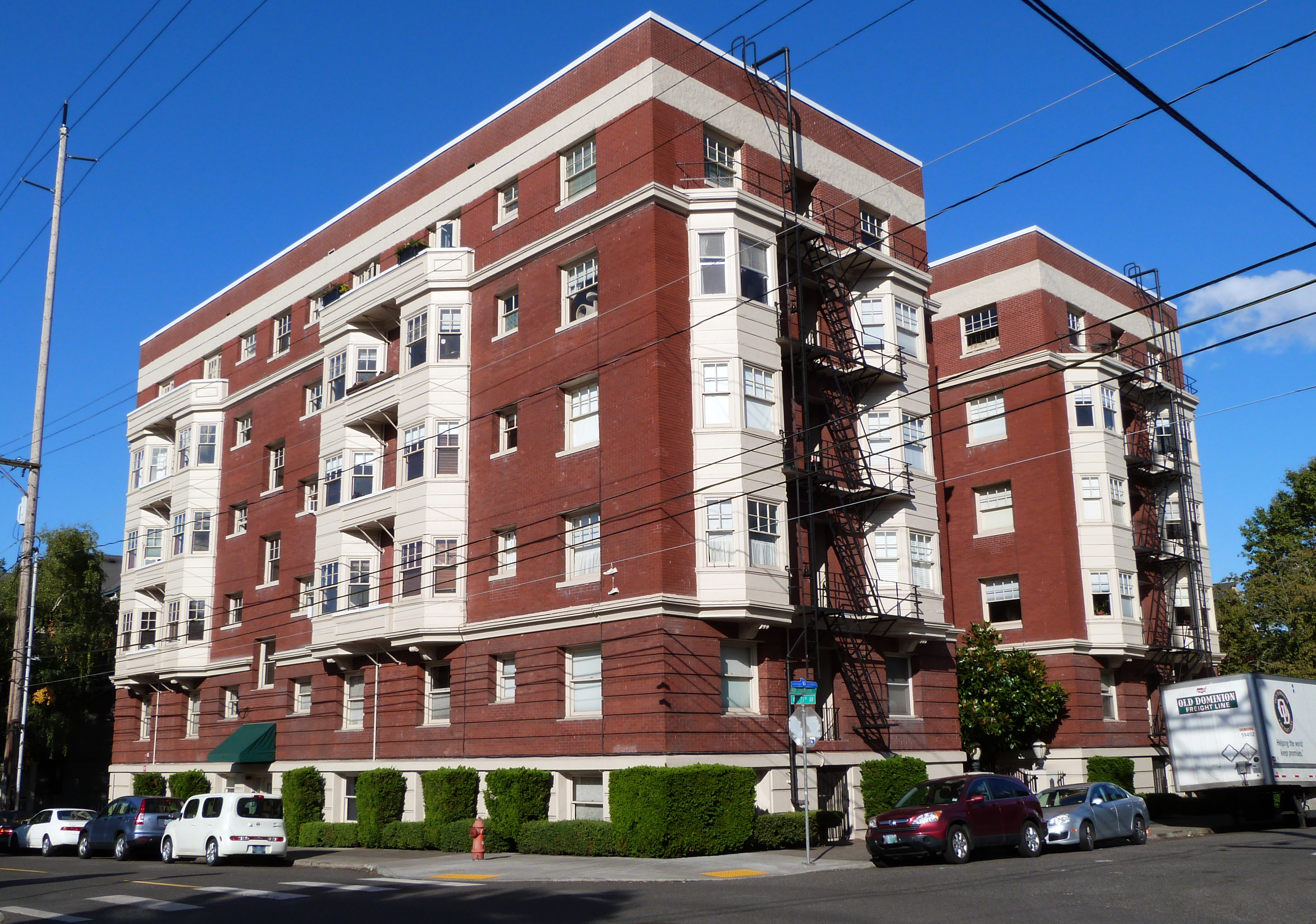

- Location within Portland, Oregon Location within Oregon Location within the United States
- Location: 2083 NW Johnson Street; Portland, Oregon
- Coordinates: 45°31′43″N 122°41′39″W
- Built: 1911
- Architect: William B. Bell
- Part of: Alphabet Historic District (ID00001293)
- NRHP reference No.: 93000452
- Added to NRHP: May 27, 1993

The American Apartment Building is a building complex located in northwest Portland, Oregon, listed on the National Register of Historic Places.

== See also ==
- National Register of Historic Places listings in Northwest Portland, Oregon
