= Mount Rushmore in popular culture =

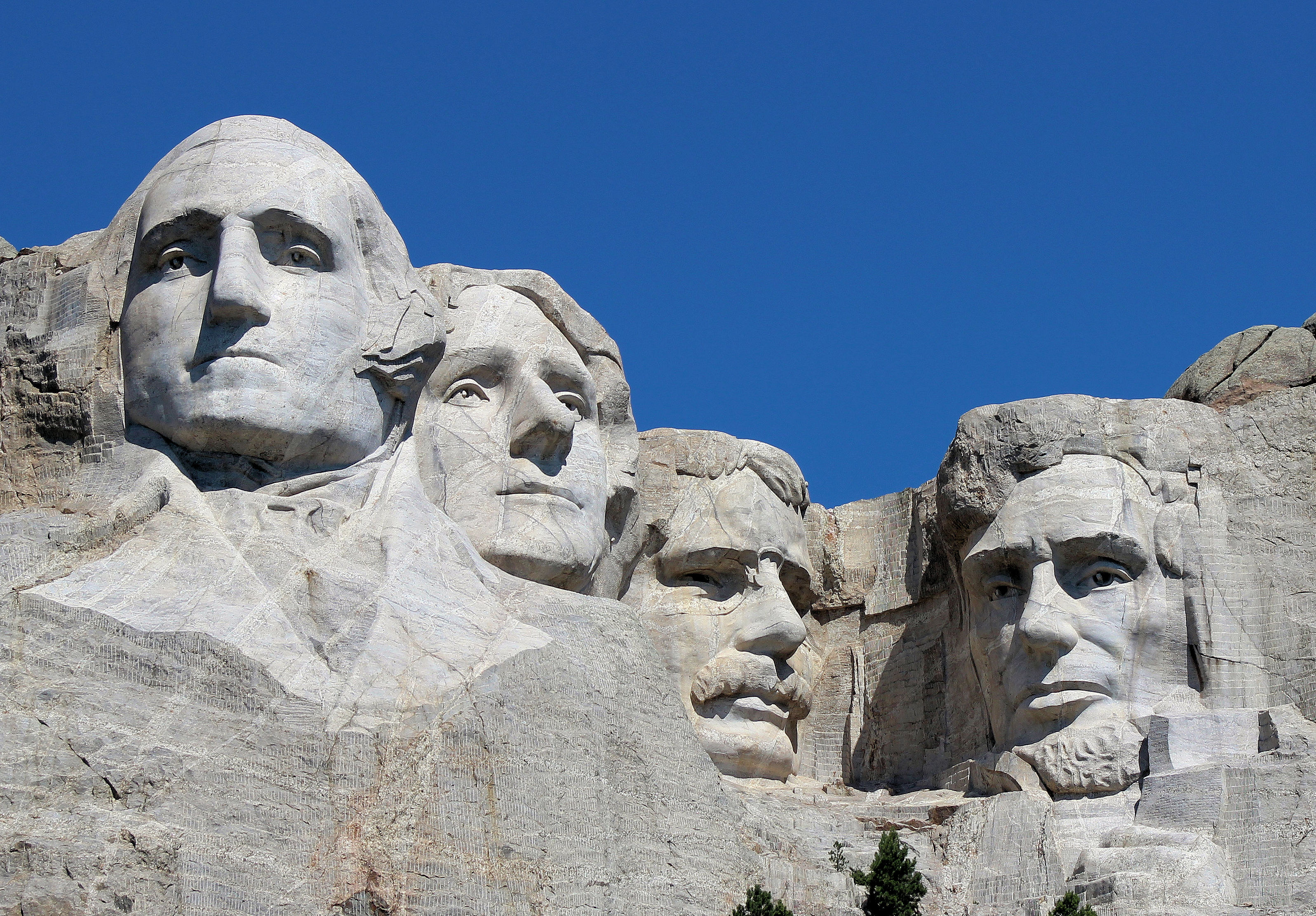
Mount Rushmore features sculptures of George Washington, Thomas Jefferson, Theodore Roosevelt, and Abraham Lincoln.

Because of its fame as a monument, Mount Rushmore in South Dakota has appeared frequently in works of fiction. It has been discussed or depicted in dozens of popular works, such as the location of the climactic chase scene in Alfred Hitchcock's 1959 film North by Northwest, and in the 2007 film National Treasure: Book of Secrets. Repeated themes using the mountain have been depictions of its destruction to imply a larger catastrophe, alterations or additions being made to the famous faces on the mountain, or use of the monument as a cover to hide a secret such as a treasure trove or military base.

== Reasons for popularity ==
The popularity of Mount Rushmore is tied to Gutzon Borglum's monumental sculpture attraction as a tourist destination. It features as a setting in a number of films, comic books, and television series and has according to Jessica Gunderson "become part of Hollywood legend". In 2016, commemorating the 75th anniversary of the monument, Time Magazine published a 90-second video listing "Mount Rushmore's Most Memorable Moments at the Movies", including North by Northwest, Head of State, Team America: World Police, Nebraska, Mars Attacks!, Superman II, Richie Rich, and National Treasure: Book of Secrets.

== Common themes ==
Gunderson notes that "films have portrayed the monument as a secret hideout, a chase scene location, or the entrance to a city of gold". Mount Rushmore "usually serves to connect the national security to individual romance", although other media exist in which the monument is used to symbolize other aspects of the human experience, such as being unfinished, as the monument is.

=== Destruction ===
Erika Doss notes that Mount Rushmore is a common target in films showing an attack on a landmark to signify the scope of a threat, "destroyed by lasers in Richie Rich (1994), ruined by an earthquake in 10.5: Apocalypse (2006), blown up by terrorist missiles in The Peacekeeper (1997), annihilated by Michael Moore (playing a suicide bomber) in Team America: World Police (2004) and defaced (or rather, refaced) in movies like Superman II (1980), Mars Attacks! (1996), and Head of State (2003)".

=== Alterations and additions to the faces ===
Mount Rushmore with a fifth President in Star Trek V: The Final Frontier (1989)

As one source notes, "Cartoonists have added more famous faces, real and imaginary, to Mount Rushmore, or show the four presidents talking. Toothpaste companies have made commercials showing how Roosevelt's teeth could be brushed if he'd only smile again!" In other cases, "movies replace the presidential faces with faces of movie characters". Examples include the 1980 film Superman II, in which supervillain General Zod and his criminal partners Ursa and Non replace the faces of Washington, Jefferson, and Roosevelt with their own, while destroying Lincoln's. In the 2021 What If...? episode "What If... Thor Were an Only Child?", Frost Giants partying with Thor on Earth add ice sculptures in the shape of Loki's horns to Mount Rushmore. The 2023 film Barbie features a fictional Barbie Land in which, among other things, "every face on Mount Rushmore is a woman".

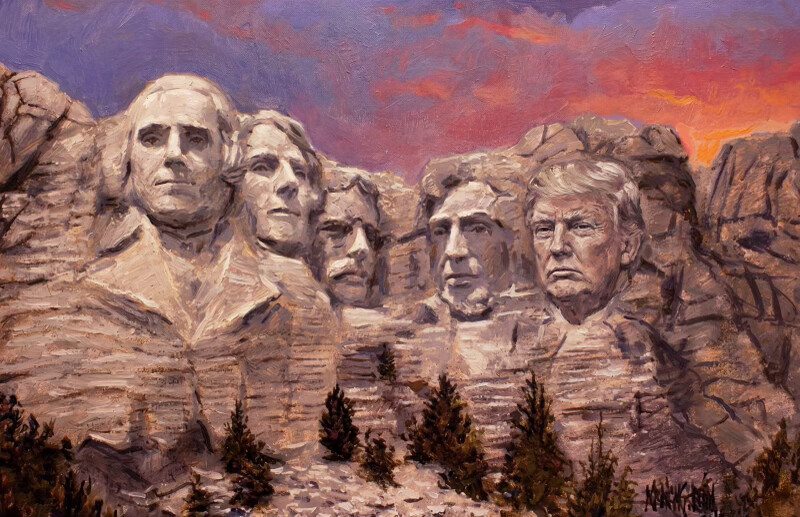
AI-generated Mount Rushmore with addition of face of the US President Donald Trump.

During his term in office, President Barack Obama was added as a fifth head to Mount Rushmore on internet depictions of the mountain. On July 8, 2009, climate change activists unfurled a banner over the monument portraying a fifth face on Mount Rushmore of Obama, depicting him as a President who could make Presidential changes in leading effective climate legislation as opposed to being a politician. Former President Donald Trump kept a sculpture in his Mar-a-Lago office, gifted to him by South Dakota Governor Kristi Noem, depicting Mount Rushmore with Trump's face added to the mountain, to the right of Abraham Lincoln.

== Imitations of the style ==
A fictional monument in the Japanese anime Naruto, inspired by Mount Rushmore

Similar monuments with other faces have been depicted by different artists. Examples include alien faces in a drawing by Gary Larson and a wall print of a version with celebrity faces: Marilyn Monroe, Humphrey Bogart, James Dean, and John Lennon. The album cover of Deep Purple's 1970 album Deep Purple in Rock has "iconic sleeve art that depicted the five Purple members' faces carved into the surface of Mount Rushmore in place of the faces of US presidents". In the Japanese manga Naruto, the main leaders of Konohagakure have had their faces carved into a mountain overlooking the village in the style of Mount Rushmore. In the 1994 film Richie Rich, the Rich family owns an imitation of Mount Rushmore, but carved with the faces of the Rich family.

== Major portrayals ==
=== In North by Northwest ===
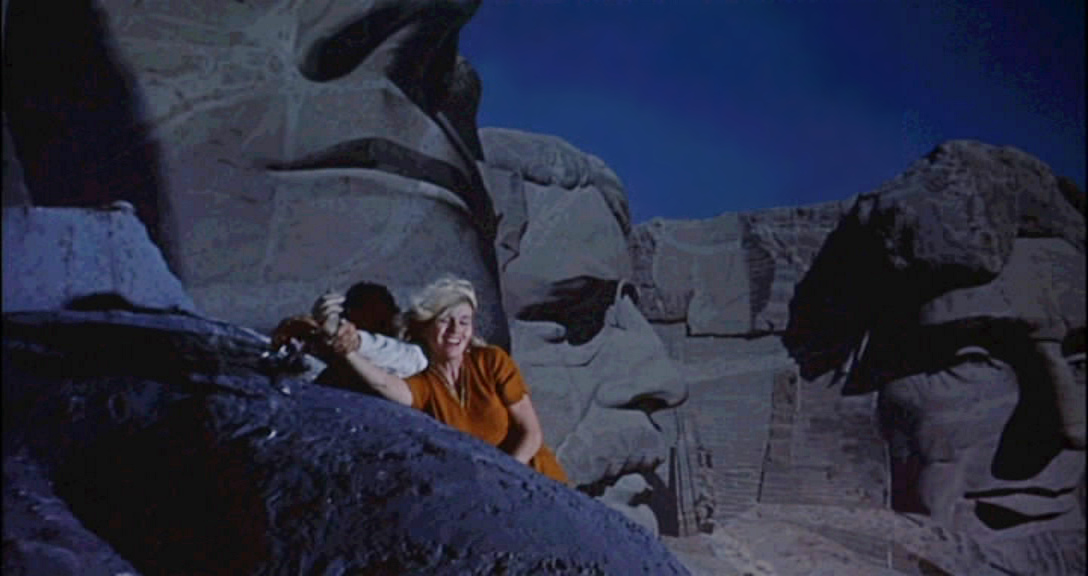
Roger Thornhill (Cary Grant) and Eve Kendall (Eva Marie Saint) dangle precipitously from the sculpture of George Washington in North by Northwest.

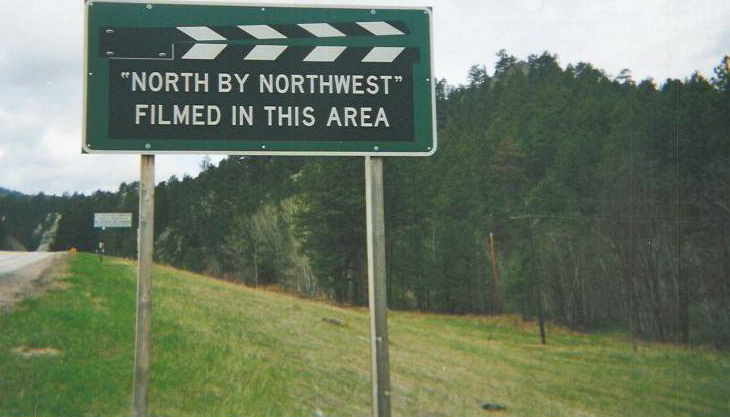
Sign near the mountain

The memorial was used as the location of the climactic chase scene in Alfred Hitchcock's 1959 film North by Northwest, which has been described as "[t]he mountain's primary visual association—aside from souvenir postcards". Scriptwriter Ernest Lehman later recalled that, as they were developing their story idea, Hitchcock "murmured wistfully, 'I always wanted to do a chase across the faces of Mount Rushmore.'" The scene in the film was not actually filmed at the monument, as the National Park Service, which had initially granted permission for the sequence to be filmed there, revoked this permission following concerns that the film would treat the monument unseriously. In the film the villain's house is located on a fictitious forested plateau above the monument. It has been noted that "the Mount Rushmore sequence undermines name, identity, and national purpose", with the protagonists of the film fleeing for their lives across the famous faces, which themselves are of no help.

The 2005 Family Guy episode "North by North Quahog", is "a parody of the film, North by Northwest, winding up in a face-off with [Mel] Gibson atop Mount Rushmore". In the 1994 film Richie Rich, the Rich family's imitation of Mount Rushmore becomes the setting for the film's finale, also echoing the finale of North by Northwest.

== In music ==
The 1986 album The Ballad of Sally Rose by Emmylou Harris satirizes the monument, singing of "Roosevelt's nose".

The song "Little Snakes", from the 2020 Protest the Hero album Palimpsest, "addresses the violent colonial history involved in the sculpting of Mount Rushmore", critiquing the monument as a symbol of colonialism, referencing the genocide of indigenous peoples and the ownership of slaves by George Washington and Thomas Jefferson.

== See also ==
- Cultural depictions of George Washington
- Cultural depictions of Thomas Jefferson
- Cultural depictions of Theodore Roosevelt
- Cultural depictions of Abraham Lincoln
