= Ambassador Apartments (Portland, Oregon) =

Historic building in Portland, Oregon, U.S.

- U.S. National Register of Historic Places
- Portland Historic Landmark
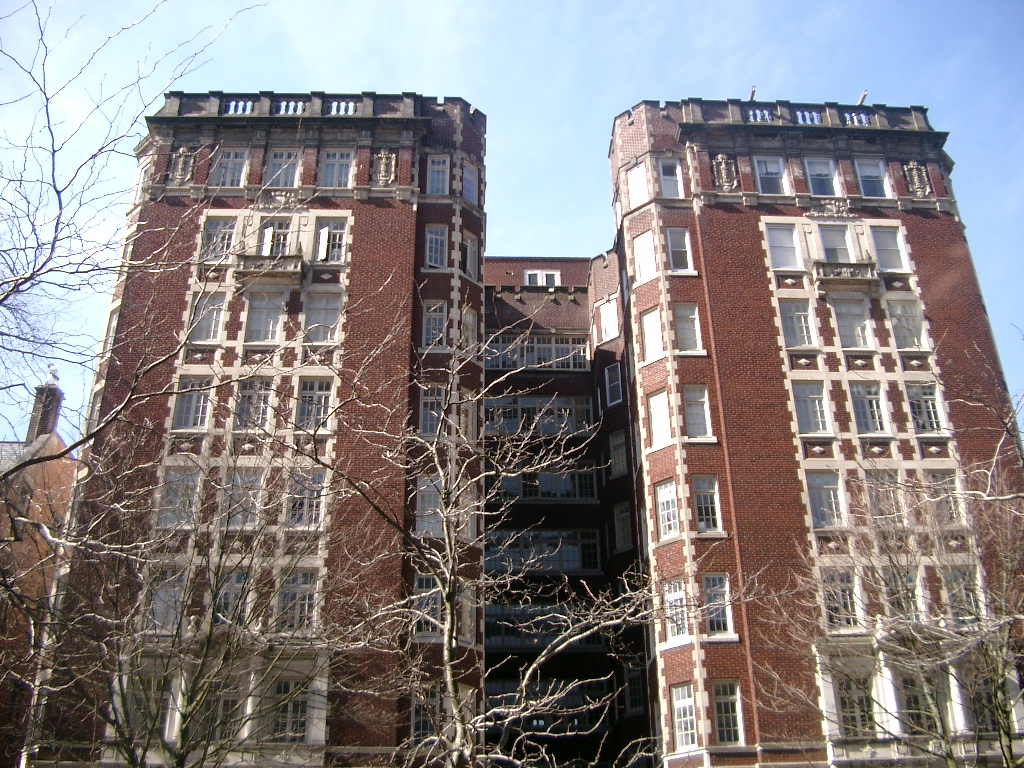
- Upper floors detail in 2007.

- Location within Portland, Oregon Location within Oregon Location within the United States
- Location: 1209 SW 6th Avenue; Portland, Oregon
- Coordinates: 45°30′56″N 122°40′51″W
- Built: 1922
- Architect: Carl L. Linde
- Architectural style: Tudor Revival
- NRHP reference No.: 79003738
- Added to NRHP: February 26, 1979

The Ambassador Apartments is a historic building in downtown Portland, Oregon, United States. Since 1979, it has been on the National Register of Historic Places.

Described as Jacobean, the Ambassador Apartments is unique in Portland for substituting Idaho sandstone instead of the glazed terra-cotta common in the facades and trim of structures dating from the 1920s.

It is a nine-story H-shaped building with about 6,000 square feet (560 m^{2}) per floor.

The building has been the residence of many prominent business and professional people, including lumber company owner Louis Gerlinger Sr. during 1929-1940 and William Simon U'Ren during 1927–1949. Edith Green maintained an office on the ground floor.

Located on prime downtown real estate, the building has now been converted into condominiums. In 1999, the smallest unit available was advertised for $148,000.

== See also ==
- Architecture of Portland, Oregon
- National Register of Historic Places listings in Southwest Portland, Oregon
