= Electric Building (Portland, Oregon) =

Historic building in Portland, Oregon, U.S.

- U.S. National Register of Historic Places
- Portland Historic Landmark
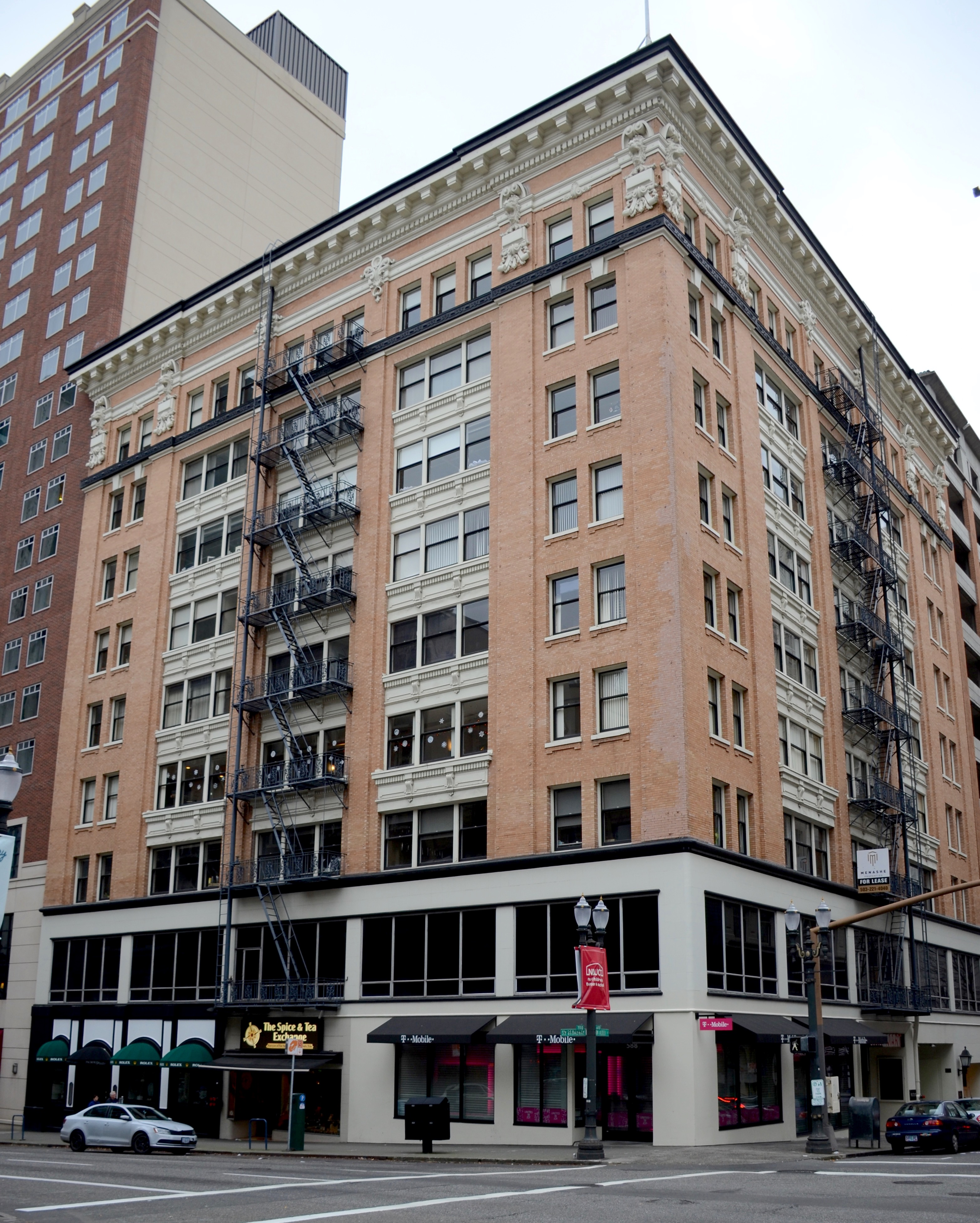
- The Electric Building in 2018

- Location within Portland, Oregon Location within Oregon Location within the United States
- Location: 621 SW Alder Street; Portland, Oregon
- Coordinates: 45°31′12″N 122°40′44″W
- Area: 0.2 acres (0.081 ha)
- Built: 1910
- Architect: Carl L. Linde, Hurley Mason Co.
- Architectural style: Chicago, Commercial Style
- NRHP reference No.: 89000059
- Added to NRHP: February 23, 1989

The Electric Building is a building located in downtown Portland, Oregon, listed on the National Register of Historic Places. It was built in 1910 for the Portland Railway, Light and Power Company, to serve as the company's headquarters and to house its main electricity generating station.

== See also ==
- National Register of Historic Places listings in Southwest Portland, Oregon
