= Digman–Zidell House =

Historic building in Portland, Oregon, U.S.

- U.S. National Register of Historic Places
- Portland Historic Landmark
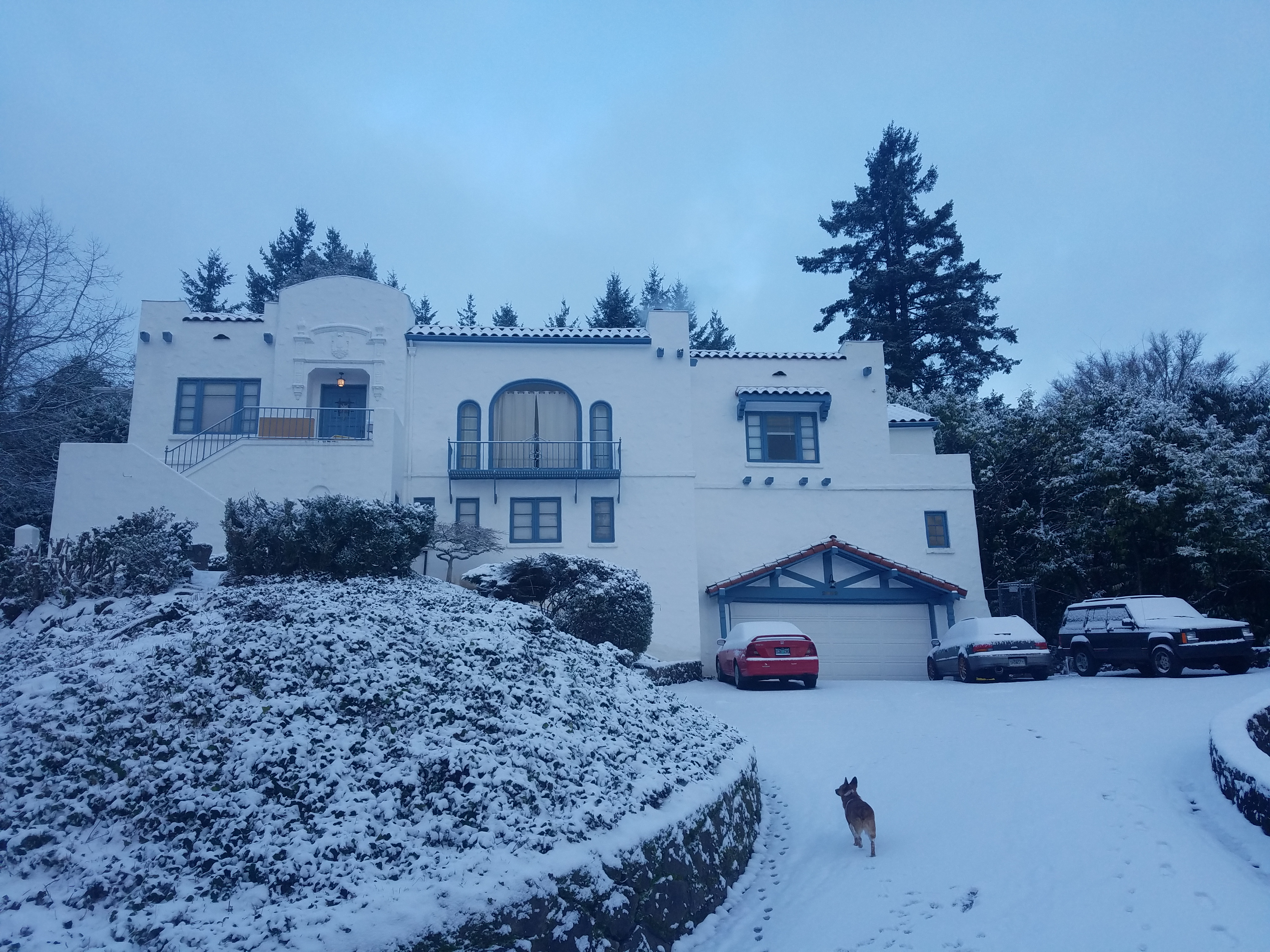
- The house in winter

- Location within Portland, Oregon
- Location: 2959 SW Bennington Drive; Portland, Oregon
- Coordinates: 45°31′14″N 122°42′43″W
- Area: 0.3 acres (0.12 ha)
- Built: 1930
- Architect: Carl L. Linde
- Architectural style: Mission/Spanish Revival
- NRHP reference No.: 93000453
- Added to NRHP: May 27, 1993

The Digman–Zidell House is a house located in southwest Portland, Oregon, listed on the National Register of Historic Places.

The house's second owner was Samuel J. Zidell, a Polish immigrant who founded Zidell Machinery and Supply Company in Portland in 1916. Zidell acquired the property from Anton E. Digman, its original owner, in 1941.

Well known Portland/San Francisco Interior Designer Dawn McKenna (ASID) acquired the property in 1965 and owned it until the mid-1980s.

== See also ==
- National Register of Historic Places listings in Southwest Portland, Oregon
