= Oliver L. Barrett =

American sculptor (1892–1943)

- Born: Oliver Laurence Barrett; October 8, 1892; Tekoa, Washington, U.S.
- Died: August 7, 1943 (aged 50); Eugene, Oregon, U.S.
- Occupations: Sculptor; educator
- Spouse: Kathryn Sartain (m. 1942)

Oliver Laurence Barrett (October 8, 1892 – August 7, 1943) was a Pacific Northwest sculptor.

== Early life ==
Oliver Laurence Barrett was born on October 8, 1892, in Tekoa, Washington, to Mrs. William Wallace Barrett. He studied art in Portland, Oregon, San Francisco and at studios in southern California.

== Career ==
Notable works include the (no longer extant) Theodore Roosevelt Memorial and Rebecca at the Well, part of the Shemanski Fountain. He sculpted the marine figure at the Battleship Oregon Memorial Park in Portland, Oregon. He also sculpted the Pan group of figures in the court of the Murray Warner Museum and the facade of a bank building in Seattle. One of his pieces, a statue of a primitive woman, was exhibited at the Metropolitan Museum of Art in New York City prior to his death. He had ambitions of sculpting a statue of Paul Bunyan and his ox Babe, but they were not realized prior to his death. He was known for having stray cats and dogs at his studio.

In 1927, Barrett joined the University of Oregon as an instructor. By the time of his death, he was an associate professor of sculpture there. Up to his death, he was conducting experiments with plastics to develop a material to eliminate casting.

== Personal life ==
Barrett married a former student, Kathryn "Kittye" Sartain of Eugene on May 29, 1942. He lived on Fairmount Boulevard in Eugene.

Barrett died on August 7, 1943, following an operation at a hospital in Eugene. His ashes were taken to his Tekoa hometown.
