= Carl L. Linde =

German-born American architect (1864–1945)

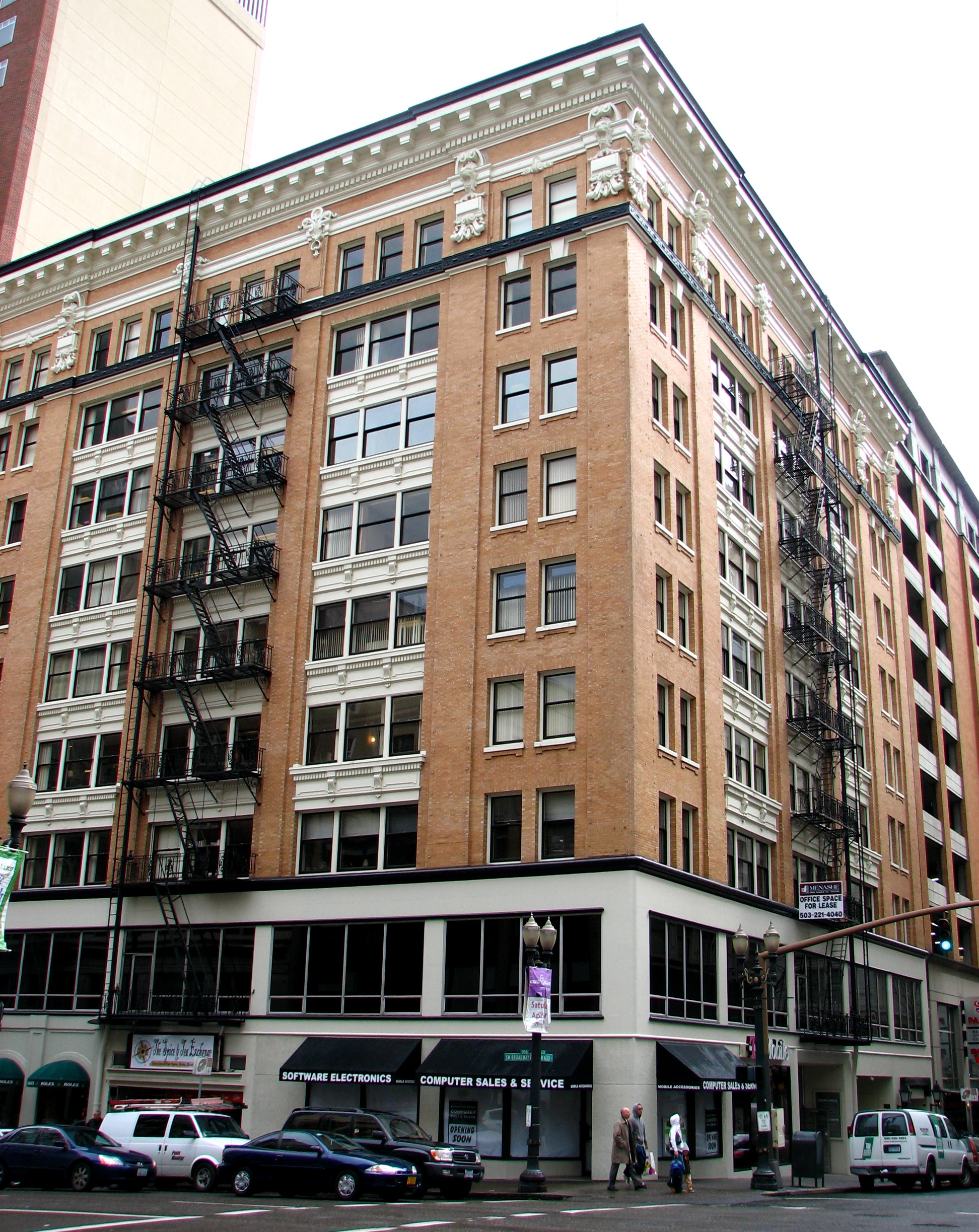
Electric Building

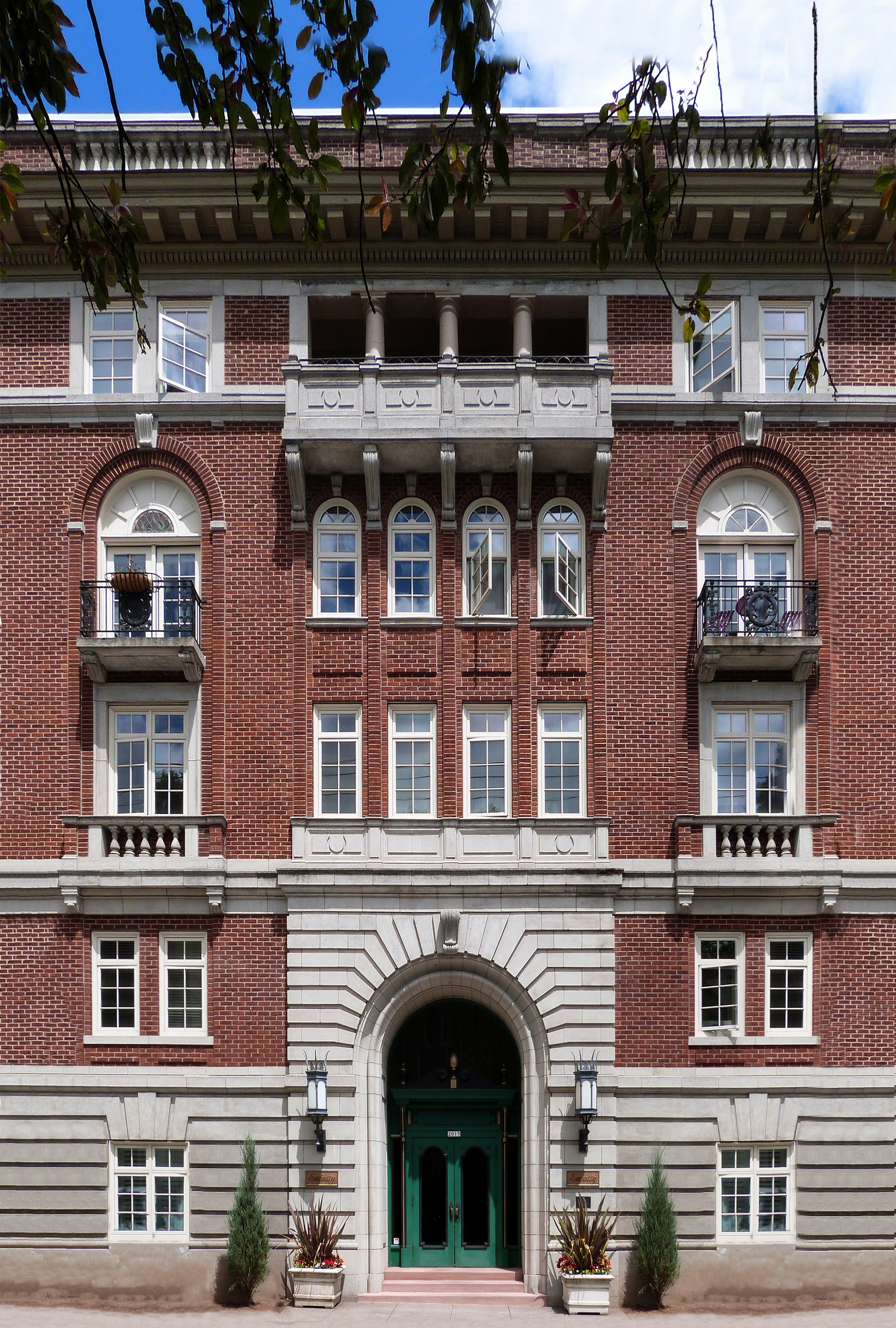
Entrance to the Embassy Apartments

Carl L. Linde (May 21, 1864 – July 12, 1945) was an American architect based in the Pacific Northwest of the United States, particularly in Portland, Oregon. Several of his works are listed on the National Register of Historic Places.

== Biography ==
Linde was born in the Duchy of Brunswick, and moved with his family to Milwaukee. He worked with O. C. Uehling and in Chicago before he moved to Portland, Oregon in 1906. He worked there as an architect until 1940. He started his own practice after 1921, and prior to that he worked for established Portland architects. Throughout his career, he became known for his preference toward Jacobean Revival architecture. Linde died in Portland on July 12, 1945.

== Works ==
- Ambassador Apartments, 1209 SW 6th Avenue, Portland, Oregon, NRHP-listed
- Camlin Hotel, 1619 Ninth Street, Seattle, Washington, NRHP-listed
- Clovelly Garden Apartments, 6309 NE Union Avenue, Portland, Oregon, NRHP-listed
- Digman-Zidell House, 2959 SW Bennington Drive, Portland, Oregon, NRHP-listed
- Electric Building, 621 SW Alder Street, Portland, Oregon, NRHP-listed
- Embassy Apartments (built 1925), 2015 NW Flanders Street, Portland, Oregon, a contributing property in the NRHP-listed Alphabet Historic District
- Envoy Apartment Building, 2336 SW Osage, Portland, Oregon, NRHP-listed
- Otho Poole House, 506 NW Hermosa Blvd., Portland, Oregon, NRHP-listed
- Salerno Apartments, 2325 NE Flanders Street, Portland, Oregon, NRHP-listed
- Sorrento Court Apartments, 2250 NE Flanders Street, Portland, Oregon
- Shemanski Fountain, South Park Blocks, Portland, Oregon
- Sovereign Hotel, 710 SW Madison Street, Portland, Oregon, NRHP-listed
- Tudor Arms Apartments, 1811 NW Couch Street, Portland, Oregon, NRHP-listed
- View Point Inn, 40301 NE Larch Mountain Road, Corbett, Oregon, NRHP-listed
