= Shemanski Fountain =

Fountain and sculpture in Portland, Oregon

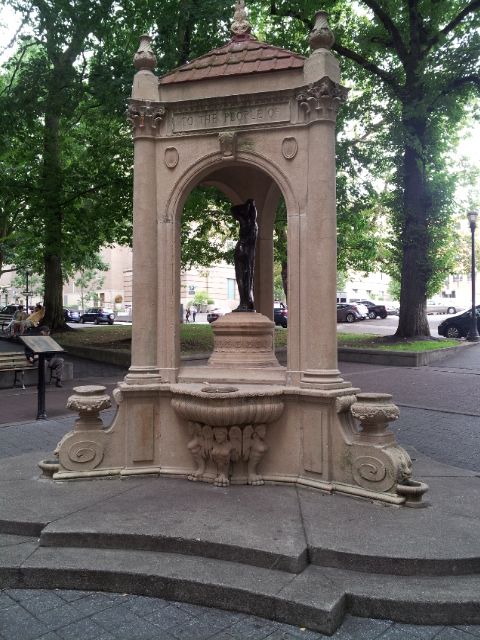
- Shemanski Fountain in 2013
- Artist: Carl L. Linde
- Year: 1926
- Type: Fountain
- Medium: Sandstone
- Dimensions: Height: 144 in (3.7 m); Diameter: 224 in (5.7 m)
- Location: Portland, Oregon; 45.517282°N 122.682144°W
- Owner: City of Portland

Rebecca at the Well
- Rebecca at the Well
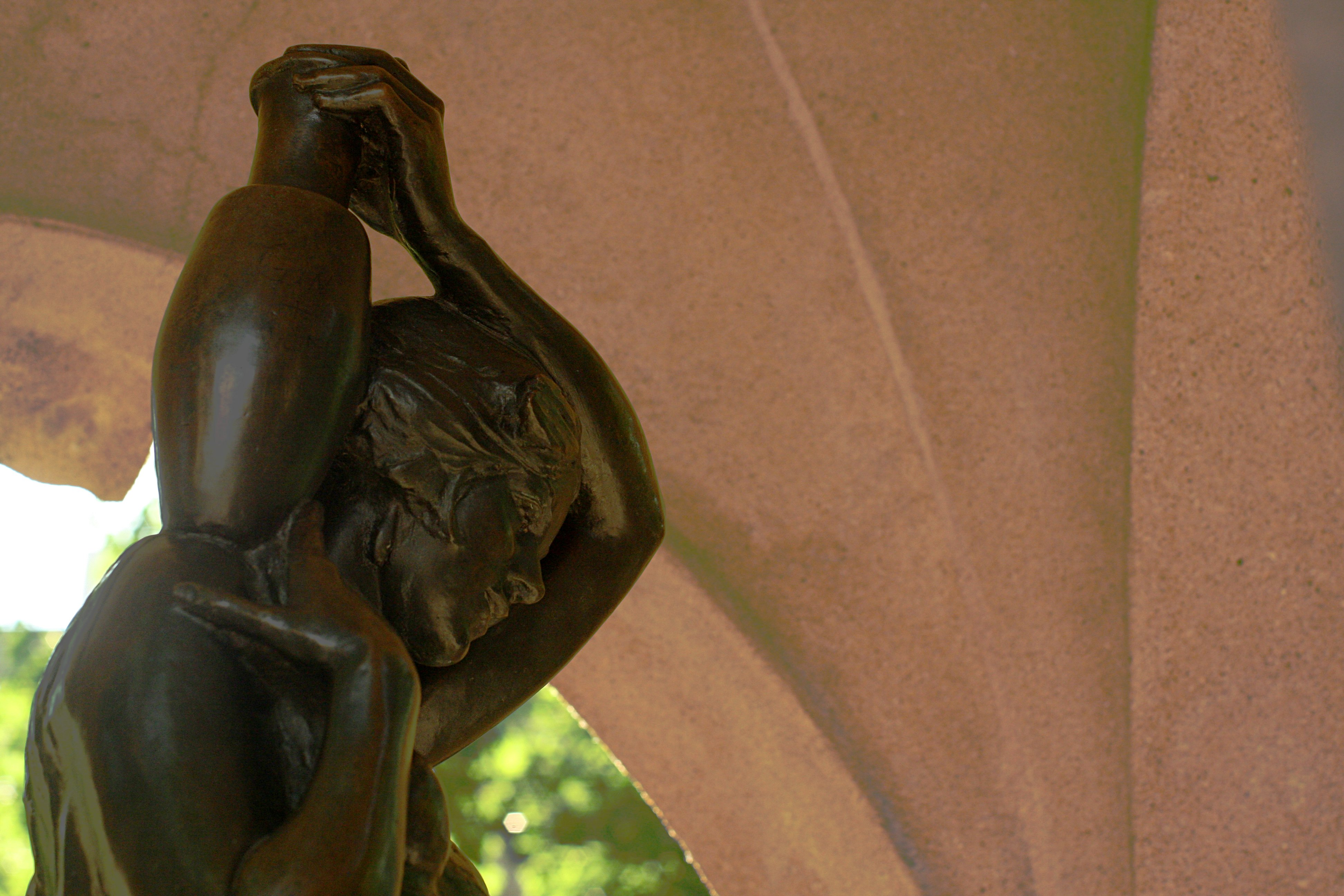
- Detail of Rebecca at the Well in 2008
- Artist: Oliver L. Barrett
- Year: 1928
- Type: Sculpture
- Medium: Bronze
- Subject: Rebecca
- Dimensions: 42×18×14 in (107×46×36 cm)
- Location: Portland, Oregon
- Owner: City of Portland and Multnomah County Public Art Collection courtesy of the Regional Arts & Culture Council

Shemanski Fountain, also known as Rebecca at the Well, is an outdoor fountain with a bronze sculpture, located in the South Park Blocks of downtown Portland, Oregon, in the United States. The sandstone fountain was designed in 1925, completed in 1926, and named after Joseph Shemanski, a Polish immigrant and businessman who gave it to the city. Carl L. Linde designed the trefoil, which features a statue designed by Oliver L. Barrett. The sculpture, which was added to the fountain in 1928, depicts the biblical personage Rebecca. Shemanski Fountain includes two drinking platforms with three basins each, with one platform intended for use by dogs.

The fountain underwent major renovations between 1987 and 1988 and in 2004. It has been vandalized on several occasions and has been used as a reference point for gatherings. It has also been included in public art guides and walking tours of Portland. According to "cultureNOW", the statue Rebecca at the Well is part of the City of Portland and Multnomah County Public Art Collection courtesy of the Regional Arts & Culture Council—the agency that maintains the sculpture. The fountain surrounding the statue, often considered part of the artwork, is maintained by the Portland Water Bureau with assistance from the Regional Arts & Culture Council.

== Description ==
Shemanski Fountain was designed by Carl L. Linde in 1925, and is located behind the Arlene Schnitzer Concert Hall between Main Street and Salmon Street in Shemanski Park, part of the South Park Blocks of downtown Portland, Oregon. It was gifted to Portland by Joseph Shemanski (1869–1951), a Polish immigrant who became a successful businessman after founding Eastern Outfitting Co., to "express in small measure gratitude" for what the city offered to him. The fountain is triangular and cast from Oregon sandstone. The Italianesque trefoil supports two drinking platforms with three basins each, with one platform intended for use by dogs. Inara Verzemnieks of The Oregonian described the fountain's lower water basins as "cute little bowl-sized pools at the base" for the purpose of serving pets "who did not have a place to cool off". Thayne Logan, a designer who worked for Linde, said that Shemanski "wanted something for the little animals". Logan also said that the fountain's original design called for granite, but it was constructed of cast stone because of that material's popularity at the time. According to the Regional Arts & Culture Council, the fountain is 144 inches (3.7 m) high and has a diameter of 224 inches (5.7 m). An inscription around the top of the fountain reads: "To the People of / The City of Portland / By Joseph Shemanski". Other inscriptions include "O. Barrett SC '27 Cal. Br. Foundry, L.A" and a signed Founder's mark. The bottom of the fountain is decorated with busts of females. It is maintained by the Portland Water Bureau with assistance from the Regional Arts & Culture Council.

The fountain's original design included a large planter, but following its construction Shemanski hired Oliver Laurence Barrett to create a bronze statue to replace the vase. Barrett, an arts professor at the University of Oregon, designed Rebecca at the Well, though his reasons for depicting the Biblical personage Rebecca fetching water are unknown. According to Portland Parks & Recreation, which operates the South Park Blocks, he chose Rebecca for "her hospitality to strangers and kindness to animals". The bureau has also said that Rebecca was chosen because of her offers to draw water for Abraham. The statue, which depicts Rebecca holding a jug on her right shoulder, was added to the fountain in 1928. Rebecca at the Well measures 42 inches (110 cm) x 18 inches (46 cm) × 14 inches (36 cm) and is maintained by the Regional Arts & Culture Council.

== History ==
Shemanski petitioned the City Council to let him gift the fountain, which began operating on September 3, 1926. In 1987, the fountain's plumbing was repaired and a new base was poured as part of a renovation of the South Park Blocks. That same year, Logan and two other men—David L. Lipman and Jeff Wolfstone, grandson and great-grandson of Shemanski, respectively—approached the Portland Bureau of Parks and Recreation, advocating for the fountain's restoration. During the renovation process, the fountain was thoroughly cleaned, had missing pieces such as finials and urns replaced and chipped corners repaired, and was coated with a sealant to protect it from the elements and graffiti. In July 1988, the fountain re-opened following nearly a year of reconditioning. A dedication ceremony to mark the restoration was held on the afternoon of July 18. One park designer with the Park Bureau said, "the water will be turned on for the first time that anybody can remember." Lipman, Logan and Wolfstone attended the ceremony. Logan, aged 88, was the only surviving person who participated in the fountain's design and construction. The men offered funds for part of the renovation and the purchase of a bronze plaque that includes the original rendering done by Logan and describes the fountain's history and recent work. Costs for the plaque and renovation totaled $14,000.

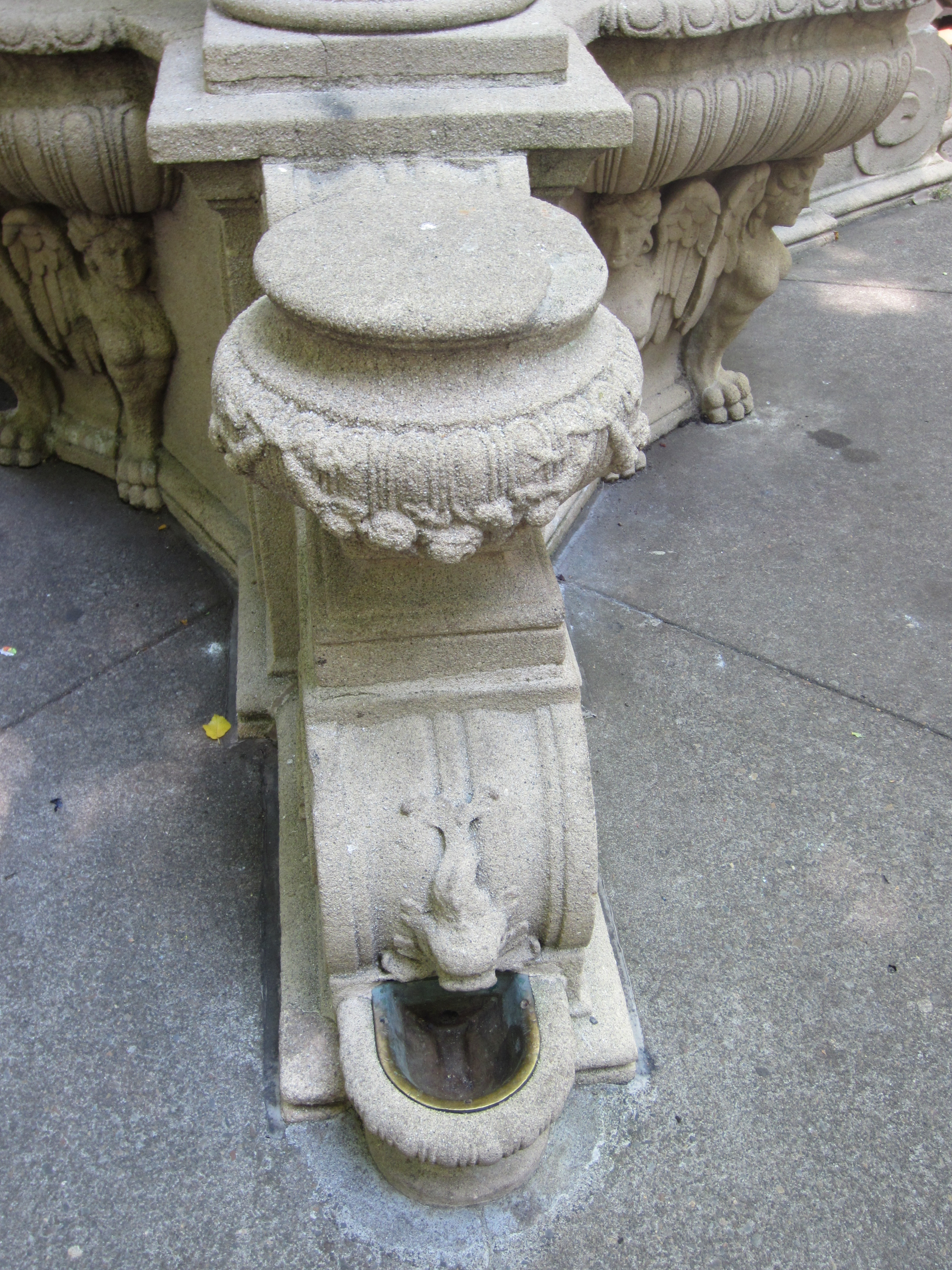
One of the fountain's lower water basins in 2013

The fountain and sculpture were surveyed by the Smithsonian's Save Outdoor Sculpture! program in 1993. Lee Lacey advocated for a 2004 restoration of the fountain; his lobbying efforts, among other accomplishments, earned him the Downtown Neighborhood Association's inaugural First Neighbor Award in 2005. The restoration was completed by conservator Marie Laibinis-Craft and Pioneer Waterproofing. In 2008, The Oregonian reported that the fountain was "completely dry".

According to The Oregonian, the fountain and statue "commemorates kindness"; however it has been vandalized on several occasions. In 1988, three brass bowls were removed from the recently renovated fountain. In 2007, the statue of Rebecca was pushed off its base, resulting in nearly $10,000 in damage. In 2008, one of the fountain's three brass nozzles was stolen. In December 2011, when Occupy Portland protesters were camping at Shemanski Park, a cup of coffee was drawn on the statue using a marker or paint.

The fountain has been used as a reference point for gatherings. In 2001, following the September 11 attacks, a peace shrine consisting of flowers, "scrawled words" and candles was erected at the fountain. In 2003, People for the Ethical Treatment of Animals displayed photographs of slaughterhouses next to those of Nazi extermination camps by the fountain. In 2006, a PDX AIDS Day Promise Vigil was held in conjunction with World AIDS Day at the site. In 2010, 600 Catholic women and their supporters gathered at the site for the first "One Spirit – One Call" event, which brought focus to their role within the Church. Shemanski Fountain was chosen at the gathering site for its depiction of Rebecca.

The fountain was boarded up in 2024. Plywood is fitted into the arches. The statute is no longer visible.

== Reception ==
AOL Travel said that Rebecca is depicted "with motion and grace". Shemanski Fountain has been included in public art guides and walking tours of fountains in downtown Portland. In 1988, The Oregonian's Suzanne Richards referred to Shemanski Fountain as "one of the city's favorite fountains". In 2006, Bonnie Darves of The Oregonian included the fountain in her walking tour of Portland landmarks, and said it is "worth getting wet for".

== See also ==
- 1926 in art
- 1928 in art
- Drinking fountains in the United States
- History of fountains in the United States
- Theodore Roosevelt Memorial (Portland, Oregon), designed by Barrett
