= Clovelly Garden Apartments =

Historic building in Portland, Oregon, U.S.

- U.S. National Register of Historic Places
- Portland Historic Landmark
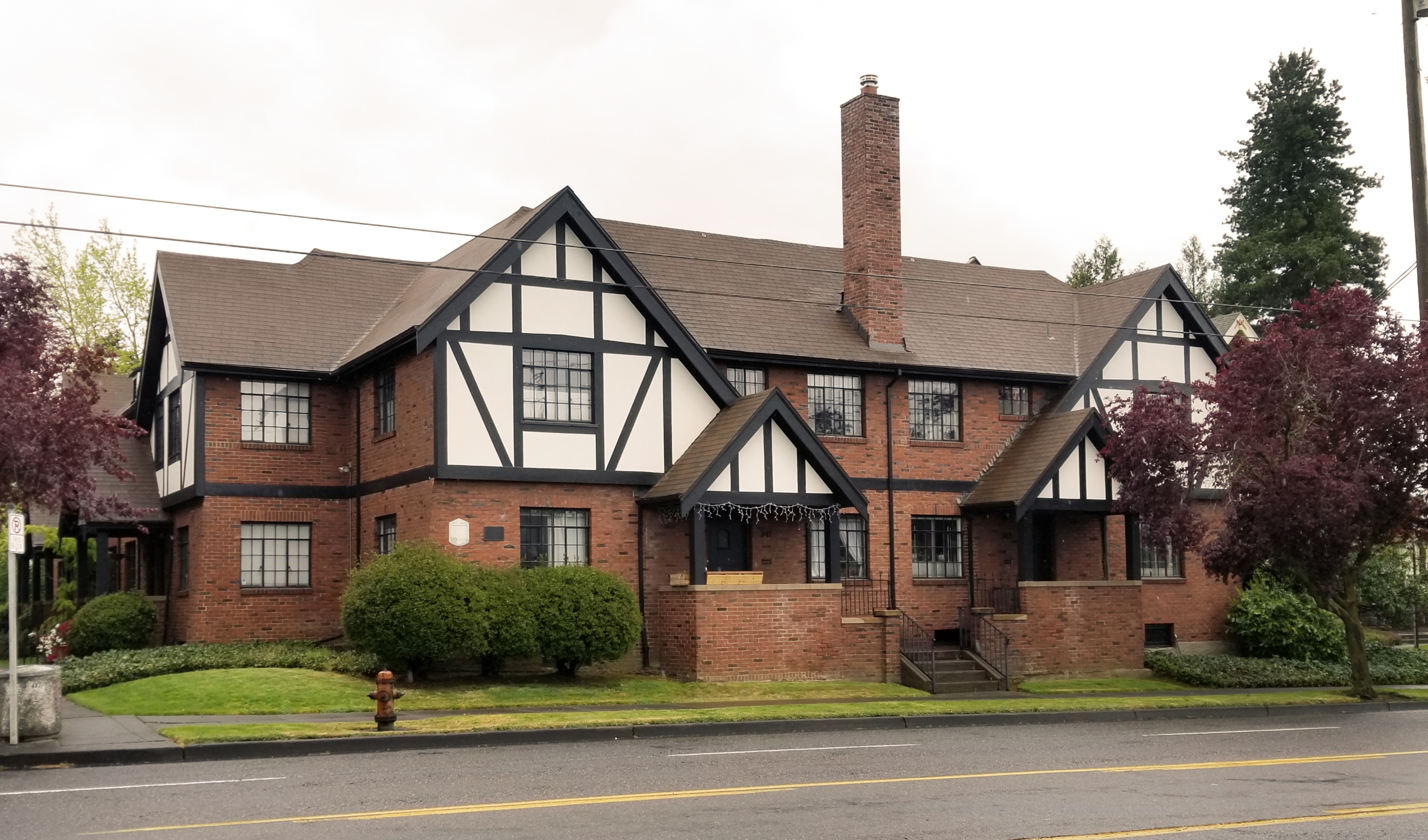
- Clovelly Garden Apartments in 2021

- Location within Portland, Oregon Location within Oregon Location within the United States
- Location: 6309 NE Martin Luther King Jr. Boulevard; Portland, Oregon
- Coordinates: 45°34′05″N 122°39′42″W
- Built: 1928
- Architect: Carl L. Linde
- Architectural style: Tudor Revival
- NRHP reference No.: 83002169
- Added to NRHP: May 19, 1983

The Clovelly Garden Apartments, also known as Holman Gardens, are a historic apartment complex located in northeast Portland, Oregon, United States. Built in 1928 in the Tudor Revival style, they are a fine example of the garden apartments popular in Portland in the late 1920s and early 1930s. They were designed by prominent architect Carl L. Linde (1864–1945) under commission to George Nease (1874–1958), an influential timber businessman. They contain light fixtures designed by Fred Baker (1887–1981), recognized as a master lighting designer in Portland in that period.

The apartments were listed on the National Register of Historic Places in 1983.

== See also ==
- National Register of Historic Places listings in Northeast Portland, Oregon
