= Cultural depictions of Theodore Roosevelt =

Theodore Roosevelt, the 26th President of the United States, has inspired numerous cultural works.

== Television and film ==
Roosevelt has been portrayed many times in film and on television. Most frequently he was played by Sidney Blackmer, who essayed the role at least seven times on film and television. Karl Swenson played him twice: in a 1962 episode of The Virginian titled "Riff-Raff," and in the 1967 western picture Brighty of the Grand Canyon, the story of a real-life burro who guided Roosevelt on a hunting trip to find mountain lions. Brian Keith played Roosevelt in the 1975 film The Wind and the Lion. James Gammon portrayed him in The Young Indiana Jones Chronicles episode "British East Africa, September 1909". He was also portrayed by actor Tom Berenger in 1997 for the TNT movie Rough Riders, a made-for-cable film about his exploits during the Spanish–American War in Cuba. Frank Albertson played Roosevelt in the 1956 episode "Rough and Ready" of the CBS series My Friend Flicka." Robert Vaughn portrayed a younger Roosevelt in the Law of the Plainsman 1959 episode, "The Dude." He is portrayed by an unknown actor in the series Deadliest Warrior as a partaker in a fight against Lawrence of Arabia. Robin Williams portrayed Roosevelt in the form of a wax mannequin that comes to life in Night at the Museum and its sequels Night at the Museum: Battle of the Smithsonian and Night at the Museum: Secret of the Tomb. In the limited series adaptation of The Alienist, Roosevelt is portrayed by Brian Geraghty. Roosevelt, portrayed by Mike O'Connell, is a recurring character in the Comedy Central series Another Period. On the MeTV series Toon In With Me, Kevin Fleming plays Theodore Roosevelt in a recurring role.

Roosevelt, as portrayed by Ed Metzger, briefly appears in The Curious Case of Benjamin Button.

The Roosevelt family was the subject of The Roosevelts, a documentary directed by Ken Burns.

In 2015, Showtime began to develop a limited series based on the life of Roosevelt.

In 2017, it was announced that Leonardo DiCaprio will portray Roosevelt in a biopic to be directed by Martin Scorsese.

Through archive recordings, Roosevelt's voice is heard in Bart Stops to Smell the Roosevelts, an episode of The Simpsons.

In 2021, HBO channel showed an American-Brazilian mini series "The American Guest" (O Hospede Americano), follows the journey of former President Teddy Roosevelt, played by Aidan Quinn, alongside Brazilian army officer Cândido Rondon (Chico Díaz), in a quest to explore unknown regions of the Brazilian Amazon

In 2022, Jeremy Bobb appeared as Theodore Roosevelt in the Showtime television series The First Lady.

In the 2022 History Channel miniseries Theodore Roosevelt. Theodore Roosevelt is portrayed by Rufus Jones. In the 2023 History Channel miniseries FDR, Jones later reprises his portrayal of Roosevelt in the first episode, entitled "Nothing to Fear".

In 2012 War of the Worlds: Goliath Roosevelt (voiced by Jim Byrnes) set in an alternate reality Earth. In 1899, the Martians launched an unprovoked attack on the major nations of the world. Roosevelt Secretary of War Theodore Roosevelt (who forsook a second term as President of the United States), and Professor Nikola Tesla, an enigmatic Serbian scientist who reverse-engineered the technology from the first, failed, invasion of the Martians and created A.R.E.S. weapons and vehicles.

Roosevelt appears twice in the Canadian television period detective series Murdoch Mysteries. Both times, he is portrayed by Martin Moreau. Roosevelt first appears in episode 5 of season 8 "Murdoch Takes Manhattan" (November 10, 2014). He appears again in episode 14 of season 11 "The Great White Moose" (February 5, 2018).

== Other works ==
In Don Rosa's comic book series The Life and Times of Scrooge McDuck (1994–1996), Roosevelt meets and befriends Scrooge McDuck in 1882 when both were visiting the Dakota badlands and later again in 1902 at Fort Duckburg. In Don Rosa's story The Sharpie of the Culebra Cut (2001), collected in The Life and Times of Scrooge McDuck Companion, they meet for the third time during the construction of the Panama Canal in 1906.

The Gaslight Murder mysteries have him as a character.

Roosevelt is a prominent character in Harry Turtledove's Southern Victory series. In the Great War trilogy, which makes up part of the Southern Victory series, Roosevelt serves as the 28th President of the United States from 1913 to 1921 and leads the US to victory over the Confederated States of America. He was elected president as a Democrat in the 1912 election against Socialist Party candidate Eugene Debs. He defeated Debs again in 1916 and attempted to run for a third term in 1920, only to be defeated by Socialist candidate Upton Sinclair. He later died suddenly in 1924 of a cerebral hemorrhage while golfing.

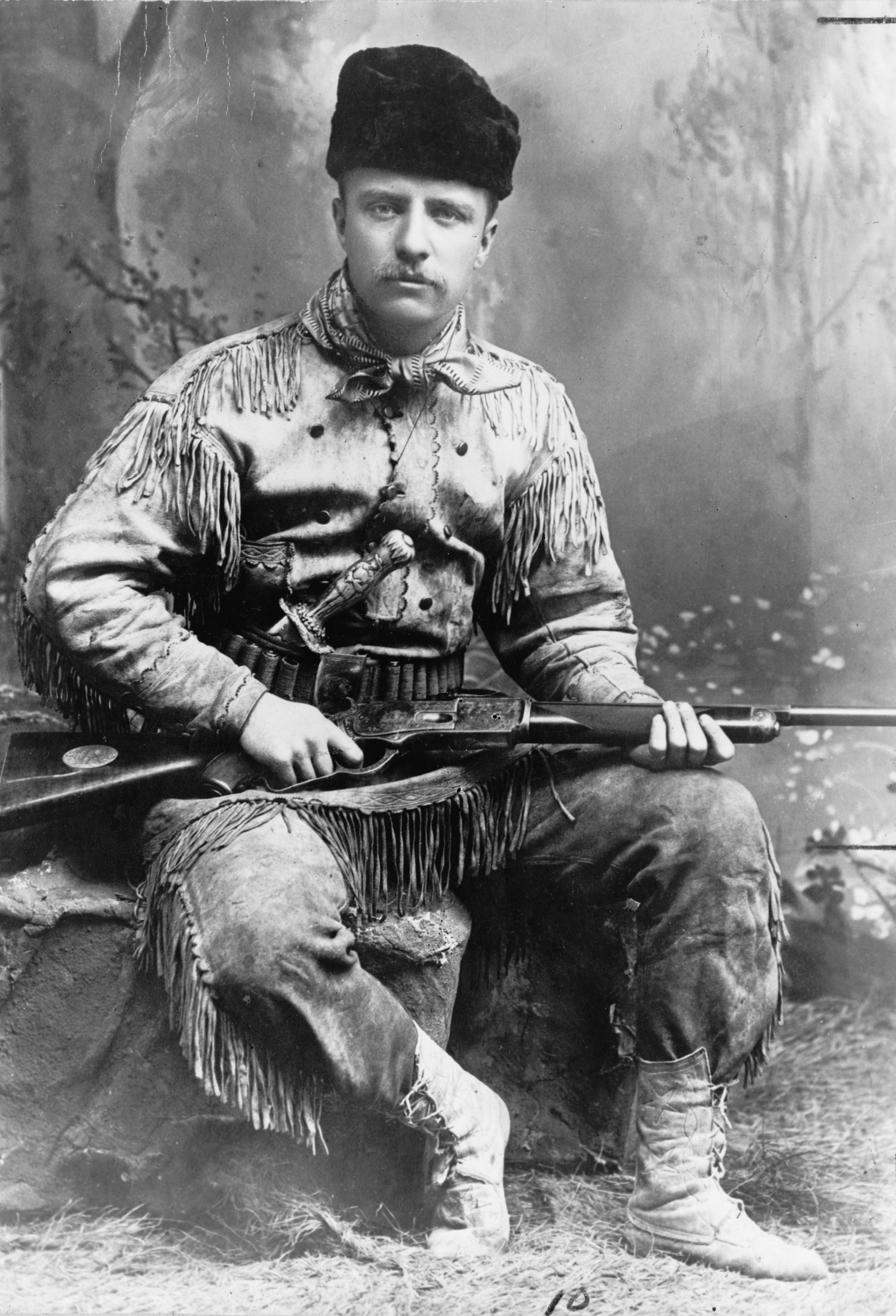
Roosevelt in the North Dakota Badlands.

Beginning in 1965, Al Sheehan produced an annual musical spectacular on the history of North Dakota performed at the Medora Musical, which included a portrayal of Roosevelt's life in the Badlands.

In the alternate history novel And Having Writ... by Donald R. Bensen (1978), Roosevelt was the first major world leader to get acquainted with the four aliens Raf, Ari, Valmis and Dark, and acts as a benevolent and friendly presence. He declines to run for a second full term in 1908 and is succeeded by Thomas Edison. In 1909, he helps the four aliens escape from house arrest (they had been place under house arrest by Edison so that he can pry technological secrets from them) in New York. In 1912, Roosevelt ends up seceding Edison, who declined to run for a second term due to him rather to go back to inventing. As with Grover Cleveland, he was counted twice in the numbering of the presidents: as the 26th president from 1901 to 1909 and the 28th president from 1913 to 1921. In 1925 while attending the demonstration of an experimental Moon rocket, Roosevelt is killed when the device's engines exploded and destroyed the platform he was on.

In the alternate history novel Back in the USSA by Eugene Byrne and Kim Newman (1997), Roosevelt wins the 1912 presidential election on the Progressive Party, only to be assassinated on December 19, 1912, at the Chicago Union Stockyards by the sharpshooter and exhibition shooter Annie Oakley, before he took office, when personally breaking a labor strike with the help of the Rough Riders. Following this, his running mate, Charles Foster Kane takes power, and gradually leads the United States into greater levels of oppression, class division and bureaucratic incompetence and corruption, which eventually leads to the Second American Civil War and Second American Revolution and the transformation of the United States into the United Socialist States of America. Roosevelt serves as the timelines equivalent of Russian Tsar Alexander II while Kane serves as the timelines equivalent of Nicholas II.

Roosevelt appears in the video game Civilization VI as the leader of the United States.

In Epic Rap Battles of History, Roosevelt appears in a rap battle against Winston Churchill for Season 5, as well as Donald Trump and Kamala Harris for Season 7 during the 2024 United States presidential election.

Roosevelt, in his career as New York City Police Commissioner, appears as a major character in the 1997 novel The Alienist, well as its sequel The Angel of Darkness.

Roosevelt is a fighter in the video game Electoral Carnage.

For a comprehensive study of Roosevelt's legacy, especially in cultural depictions, see Michael Patrick Cullinane, Theodore Roosevelt's Ghost: The History and Memory of an American Icon (LSU Press, 2017).

== See also ==
- Theodore Roosevelt Memorial (Portland, Oregon)
- List of memorials to Theodore Roosevelt
