= Salerno Apartments =

Historic building in Portland, Oregon, U.S.

- U.S. National Register of Historic Places
- Portland Historic Landmark
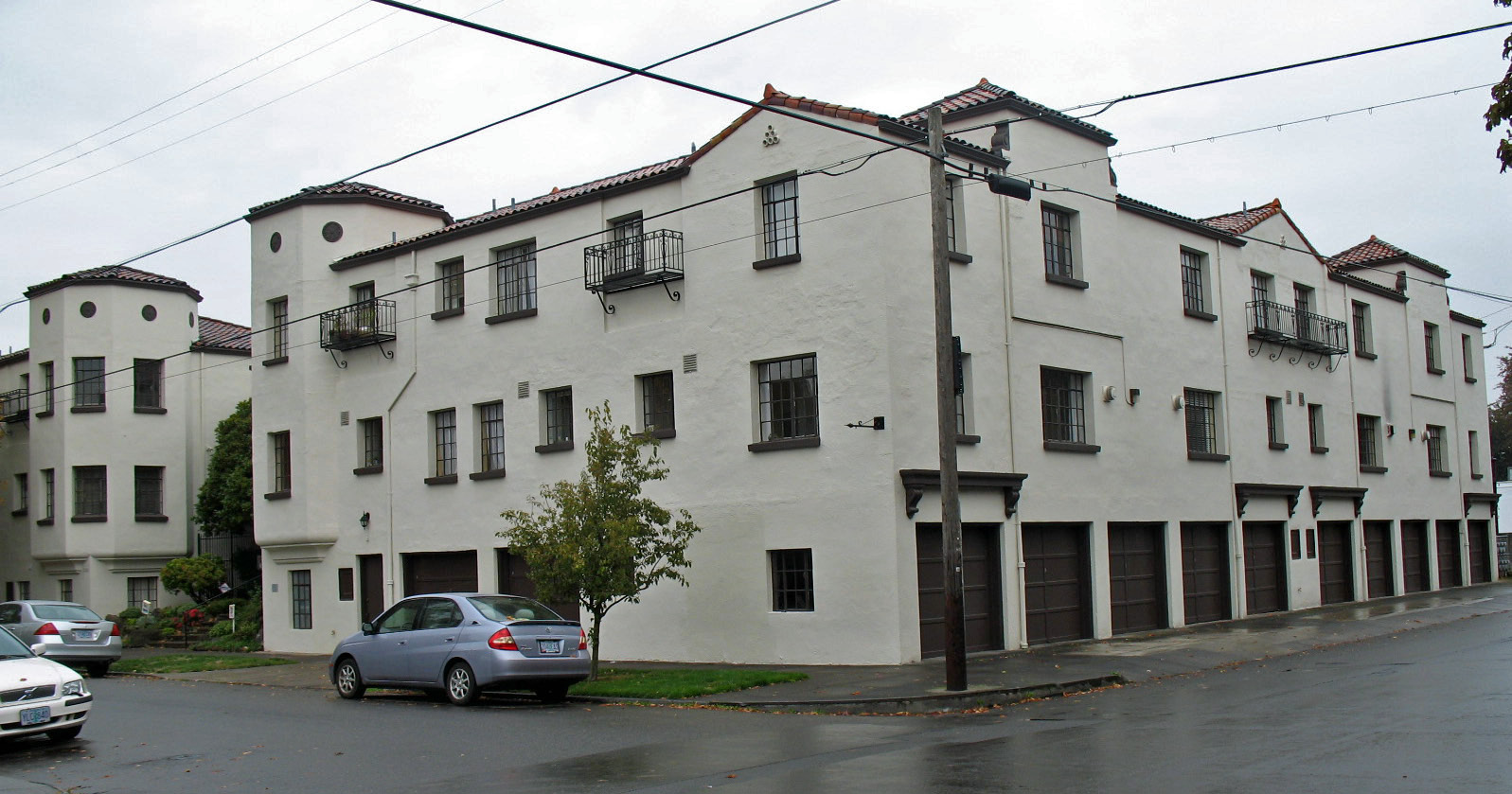
- The building in 2009

- Location within the United States Location within Oregon Location within Portland, Oregon
- Location: 2325 NE Flanders Street; Portland, Oregon
- Coordinates: 45°31′33″N 122°38′31″W
- Built: 1929–1930
- Built by: Chandler Construction Company
- Architect: Carl L. Linde
- Architectural style: Mediterranean Revival
- NRHP reference No.: 93001563
- Added to NRHP: January 28, 1994

The Salerno Apartments are a historic apartment building in Portland, Oregon, United States. Built in 1929–1930 in the Mediterranean Revival style, its courtyard evokes "a quiet street in an old Mediterranean town". Architect Carl L. Linde experimented with garden court-type apartments in the nearby 1929 Sorrento Apartments, and perfected the form in the Salerno building.

The building was entered on the National Register of Historic Places in 1994.

== See also ==
- National Register of Historic Places listings in Northeast Portland, Oregon
