= Roosevelt, Georgia =

Unincorporated community in Georgia, U.S.

Coordinates: 34°42′11″N 84°33′02″W

Roosevelt is an unincorporated community in Gilmer County, in the U.S. state of Georgia.

== History ==
A post office called Roosevelt was established in 1900, and remained in operation until 1921. The community has the name of Theodore Roosevelt, 26th President of the United States.
