= The Rae Flats and The Raleigh =

- U.S. National Register of Historic Places
- New York State Register of Historic Places
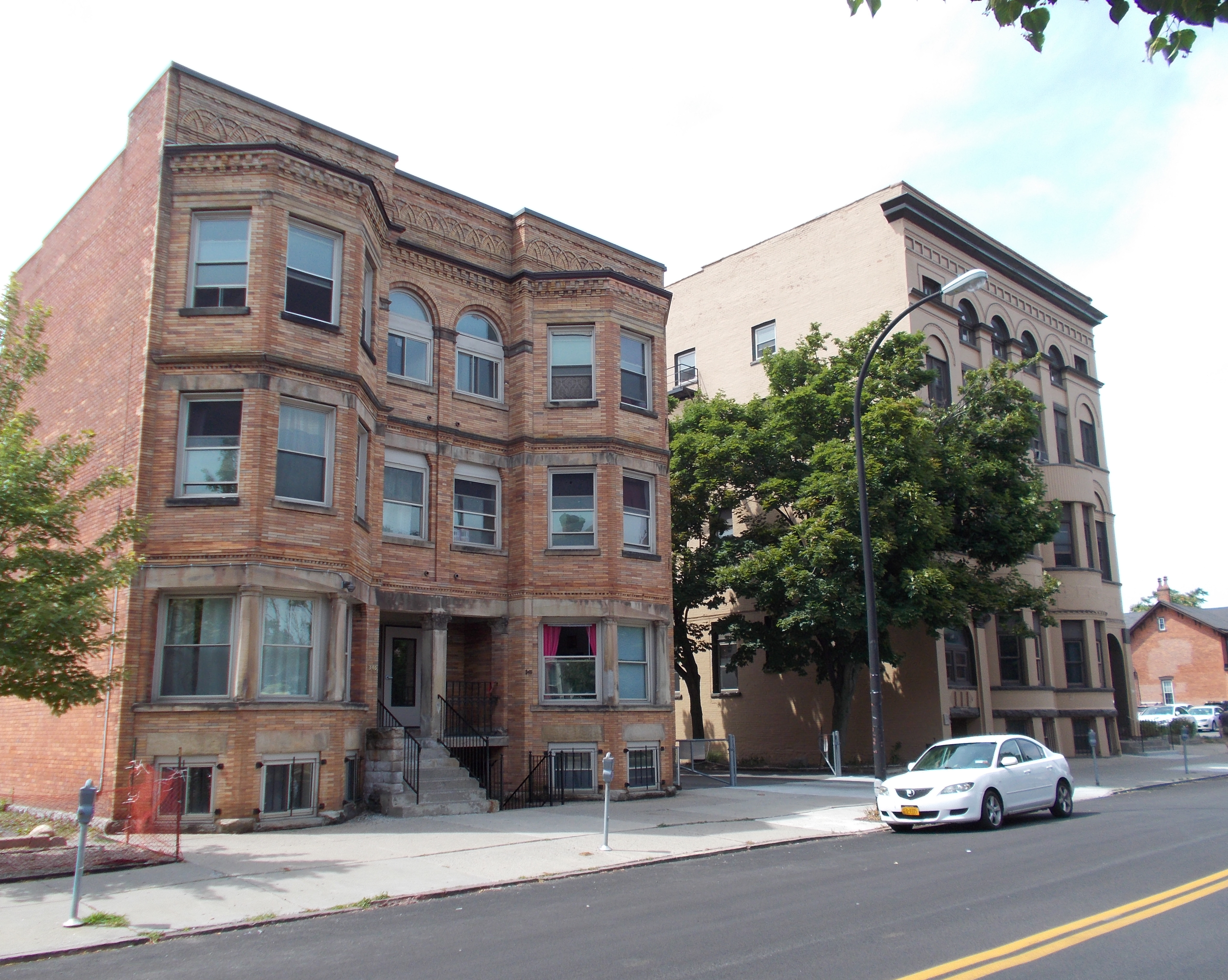
- The Rae Flats and The Raleigh, July 2016

- Location within New York Location within the United States
- Location: 346 and 354 Franklin St., Buffalo, New York
- Coordinates: 42°53′40″N 78°52′27″W
- Area: .55 acres (0.22 ha)
- Built: c. 1892– 1930 (The Rae); ca. 1896 – 1936 (The Raleigh)
- Architect: John H. Coxhead (Raleigh)
- Architectural style: Romanesque Revival, Norman
- NRHP reference No.: 16000842
- NYSRHP No.: 02940.000650, 02940.000651

Significant dates
- Added to NRHP: December 13, 2016
- Designated NYSRHP: October 7, 2016

The Rae Flats and The Raleigh, also known as The Phoenix; The Hotel Raleigh; The Tudor Arms; The Phoenix Apartments, are two historic apartment buildings located in the Allentown neighborhood of Buffalo, New York, United States. The Rae was built about 1892, and is a three-story, polychromatic brick building over a raised basement with Norman inspired detailing. The Rae houses a total of seven apartments. The Raleigh was built about 1896 as a Jewish clubhouse and converted to apartments in 1901. It is a four-story, Romanesque Revival style brick building that houses 28 apartments.

It was listed on the National Register of Historic Places in 2016.
