= Camlin Hotel =

- U.S. National Register of Historic Places
- Seattle Landmark
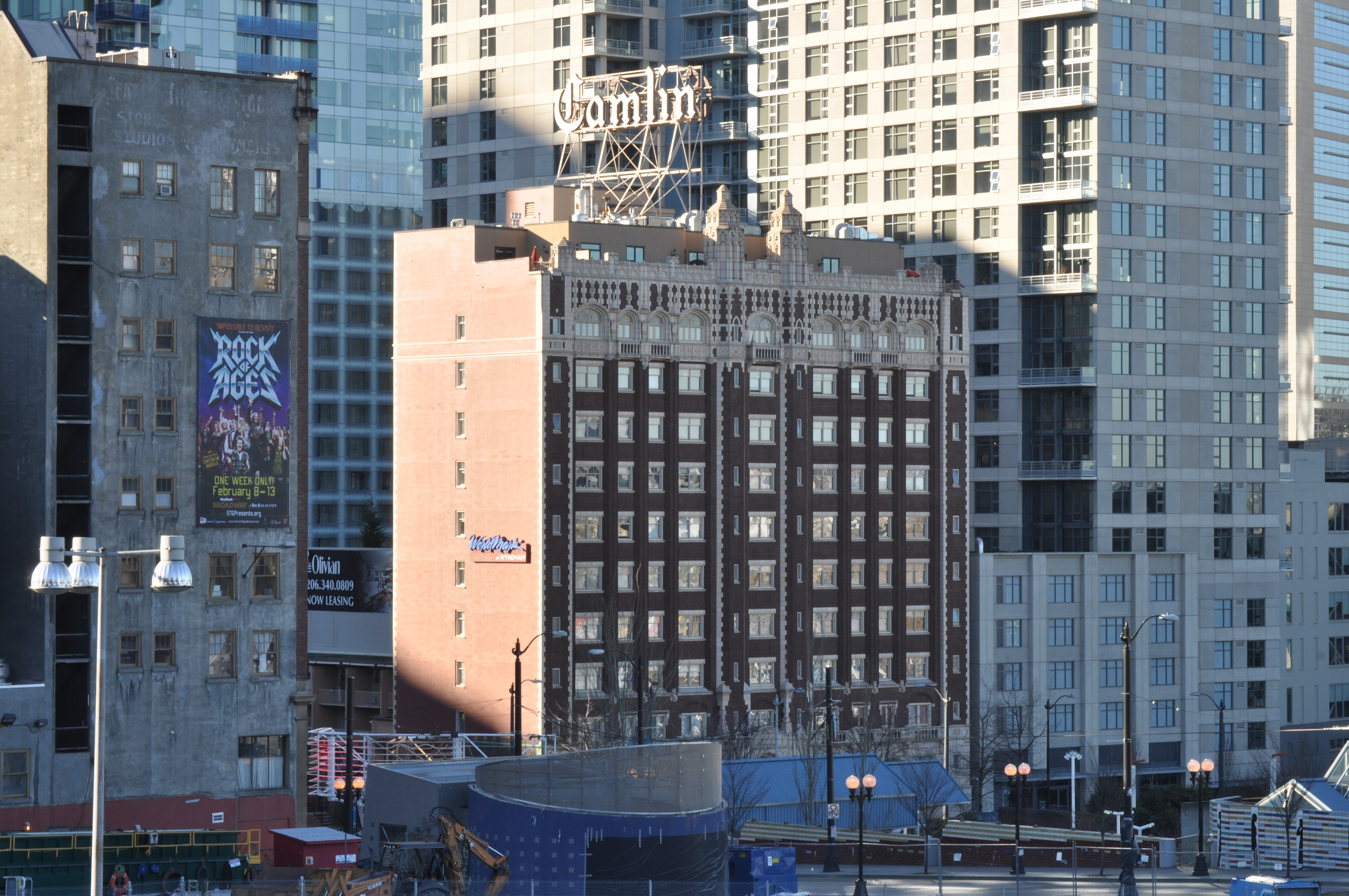
- The Camlin Hotel in downtown Seattle

- Location within Downtown Seattle
- Location: 1619 9th Avenue; Seattle, Washington
- Coordinates: 47°36′50″N 122°19′57.7″W
- Built: 1926
- Architect: Carl Linde
- Architectural style: Tudor Revival
- NRHP reference No.: 99000405

Significant dates
- Added to NRHP: March 25, 1999
- Designated SEATL: May 17, 1999

The Camlin Hotel is an historic hotel in Downtown Seattle, Washington. The hotel was added to the National Register of Historic Places in 1999.

== History ==
=== Design ===
The architect for the Camlin was Carl L. Linde of Portland, a one time brewery builder, who had built the edifice to resemble an Italian castle. The 94 apartments had all of the latest conveniences, such as "shower baths" and dinettes and kitchenettes. The penthouse comprised the entire 11th floor.

On October 31, 1926, the Camlin Apartment Hotel had its official opening. The Seattle Times at the time stated,

the exterior effect of the Camlin is such as to make it stand out from all parts of the city. Instinctively, the thought is born of the magnificent view of the Sound and Olympics which is to be had from the lofty windows in the rear of this edifice. Nothing has been spared in the way of expense in its construction. The Camlin stands as a monument to Seattle's development, a mark which equals anything to be found anywhere on the Pacific Coast.

=== Finance problems ===
The building of the Camlin Hotel was sponsored by Adolph Linden and Edmund W. Campbell, the President and Vice-President/Secretary of the Puget Sound Savings & Loan. However, in May, 1926, the month of the hotel's opening, a bank employee had noticed some questionable withdrawals, and had brought them to the attention of the bank's board. The withdrawals included $866,000 to finish the Camlin Hotel.

The State Supervisor of Savings and Loans, Mr. W.L. Nicely, after meeting with the board and looking at the evidence stated,

This resulted in the meeting of the officers and directors with the supervisor October 2, when it was decided, with my advice and concurrence, that instead of closing the institution, the interests of the shareholder would be better served by securing an agreement with Linden and Campbell to make restitution as far as possible by turning over to the association all of their personal and other holdings, including the Camlin Apartment Hotel, under a trust agreement, and that, under the direction of the supervisor an endeavor would be made to restore the impairment of the capital of the association, the same officers and directors to continue in office, and the completion of the Camlin Apartment Hotel, which is under construction, to be carried out.

It took a year for this trust to be finalized and put on record. It was valued at $1.75 million, and included everything that Campbell and Linden owned. The agreement was not made public at the time.

=== Sale ===
Before the Puget Sound Savings and Loan went under in 1931, the Camlin had been sold to the Vance Lumber Company, which already owned Seattle's Vance Hotel.

== Building modifications ==
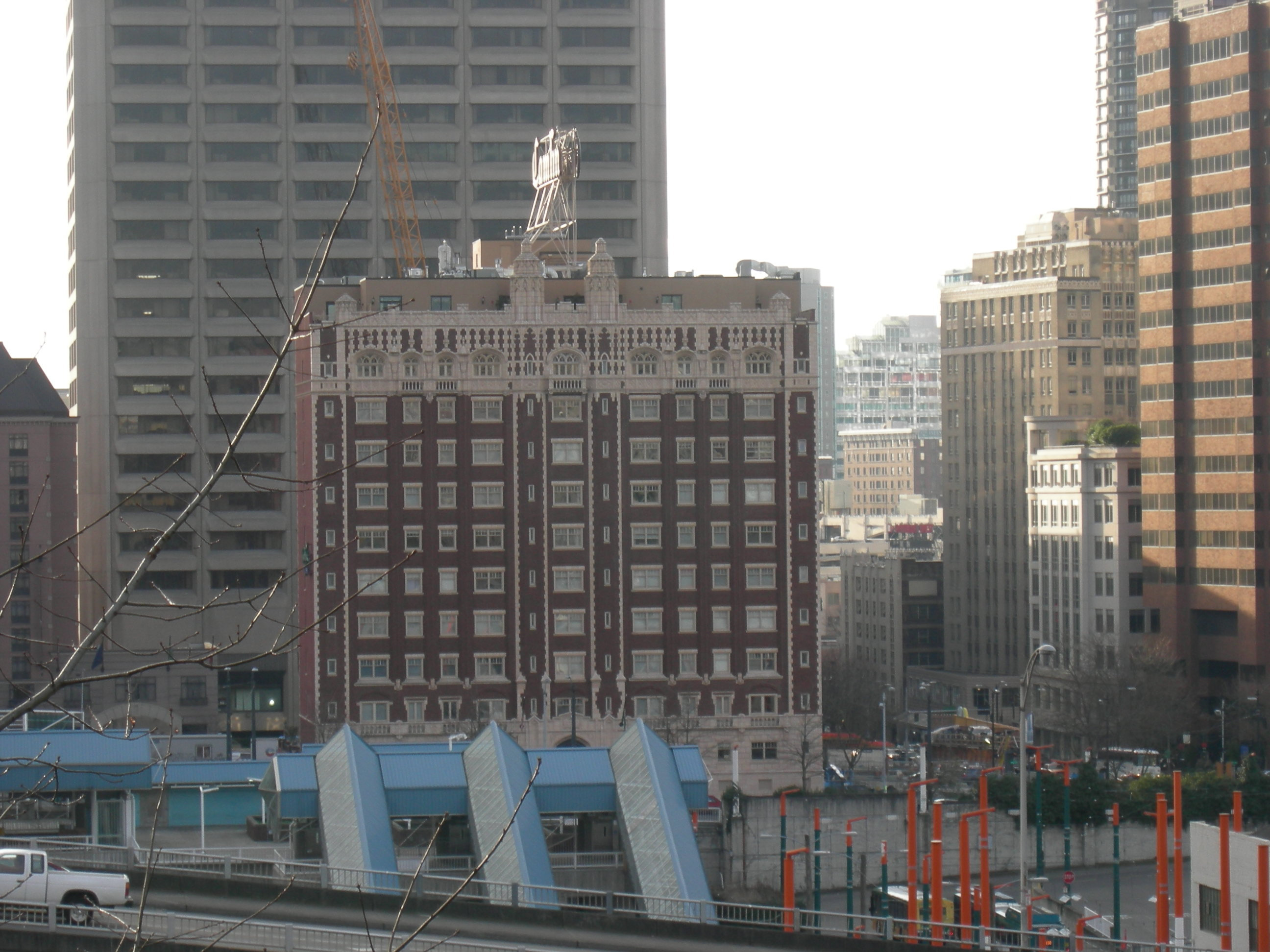
The Camlin from Capitol Hill, 2006

In 1942, Vance proposed the addition of a cocktail lounge to the top floor of the Camlin. The penthouse, which had never been as successful as hoped, would be converted into the Cloud Room. At the same time, fifty new rooms were added, by cutting down the size of the original rooms.

=== The Cloud Room ===
In the ensuing years, the Cloud Room hosted numerous famous faces, among them Frank Sinatra, Dean Martin, Elvis Presley, Dizzy Gillespie, Miles Davis, Bonnie Raitt, John Lee Hooker, and Elvis Costello. The Cloud Room had the smoky atmosphere of a speakeasy, with the comforts of a four star restaurant. Live entertainment was the main idea, and several acts got their start there. In the 1950s, the Camlin also housed the studios and offices of radio station KVI AM 570.

With the recent purchase of the hotel by Trendwest, the Cloud Room was closed and replaced by penthouse units. It can still be seen in the film The Fabulous Baker Boys, (although it was not, as is commonly rumored, the location of the famous scene where Michelle Pfeiffer sings the song Makin' Whoopee while sitting on a piano. That scene was filmed in the Crystal Ballroom of the Biltmore Hotel in Los Angeles).

=== Cabana units ===
In 1960, in preparation for the 1962 World's Fair, 52 cabana units were added, along with a pool and a sun deck for a total cost of $2 million.

== Other uses ==
After 1960, the Camlin was home to the Italian Consulate. In one promotional device, a 40-foot (12 m) yacht floating in the pool, was housed inside the hotel. When the boat's bilge pump malfunctioned, and it started taking on water, it was even more of an advertisement: "Boat sinks in Downtown Seattle."

In the late 1960s, the Camlin Hotel hosted performers for the legendary Sky River Rock Festival in Sultan, Washington.

== Changes of ownership ==
In the late 1980s and 1990s, the Camlin went through many owners. One owner, in 1990, was planning to sell all the antique furniture, but was stopped only when the Washington State Attorney General's office slapped a lien on it for tax evasion.

In 2003 the Camlin was bought by Trendwest Resorts, to become the jewel in the crown of their properties worldwide. After more than a year, and $21 million in remodeling, the Camlin was reopened and it is now known as "Worldmark Seattle: The Camlin."
