= Tudor Arms Apartments (Portland, Oregon) =

Historic building in Portland, Oregon, U.S.

- U.S. National Register of Historic Places
- U.S. Historic district – Contributing property
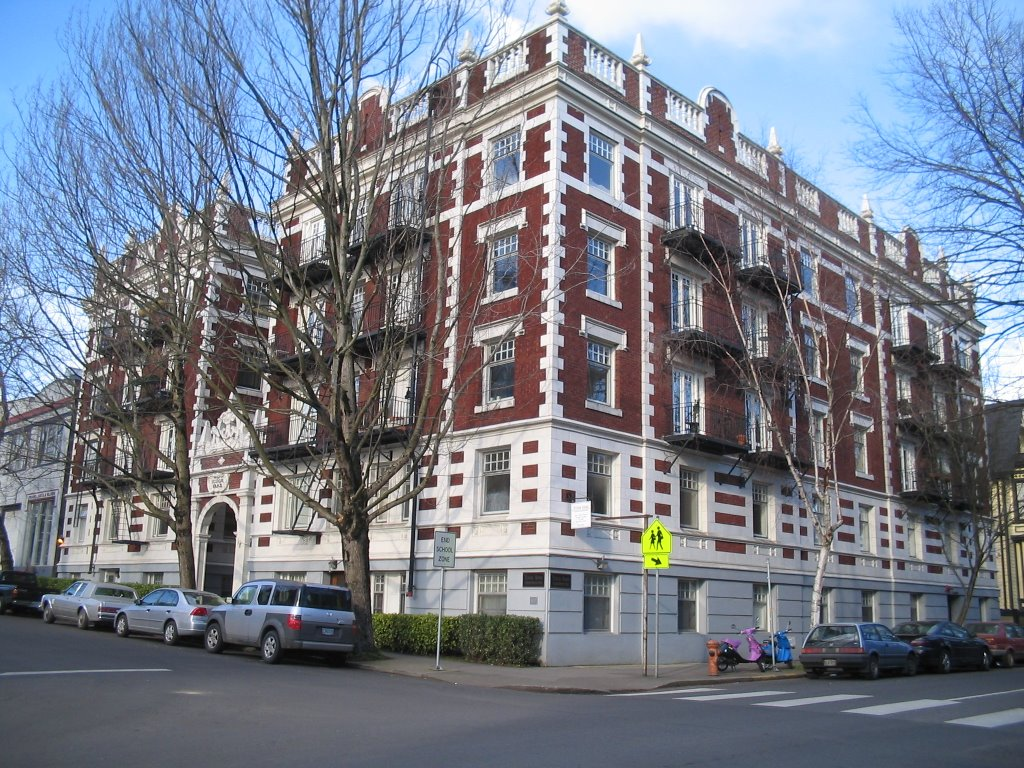
- Wide shot of entire building

- Location within Portland, Oregon Location within Oregon Location within the United States
- Location: 1811 NW Couch Street; Portland, Oregon
- Coordinates: 45°31′26″N 122°41′22″W
- Built: 1915
- Architect: Carl L. Linde
- Part of: Alphabet Historic District (ID00001293)
- NRHP reference No.: 93001562
- Added to NRHP: January 28, 1994

The Tudor Arms Apartments are a historic building in Portland, Oregon, United States. Located in Northwest or Nob Hill District, an area zoned for historic preservation, adjacent to the Pearl District and Downtown Portland, the building was converted to condominiums in 2006. In order to maintain its historical status most of its original features have been preserved.

== History and design ==
The five-story building was completed in 1915. It has been on the National Register of Historic Places since 1994. The nineteenth-century Tudor Revival/Jacobethan style architecture was designed by noted Portland architect Carl L. Linde. It was built by R. F. Wassel, who was also from Portland. The exterior is brick with decorative white glazed terra cotta lintels and an archway bearing the building's name marks the entrance into a landscaped courtyard.

The leaded glass entry opens into a grand foyer paneled with mahogany wainscoting and underscored with marble flooring. Individual apartments have hardwood floors and original mill work. After the building was constructed, electric ranges were installed in some residences. Reportedly, the apartment building was used by two gangsters, Bugsy Siegel and Mickey Cohen, as a hide-out.

== Gallery ==
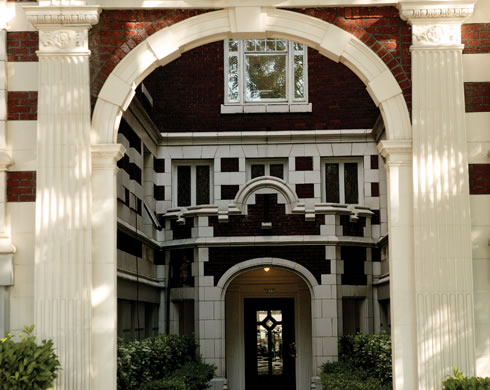
Main entry courtyard of the Tudor Arms

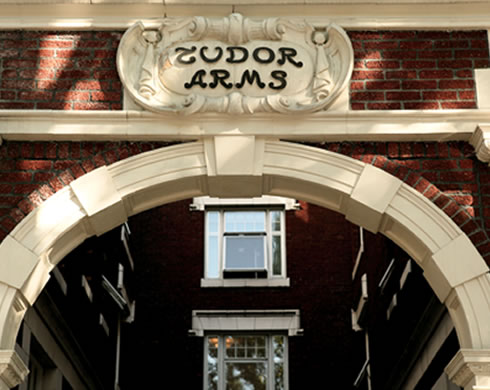
Detail of archway entrance

== See also ==
- Architecture in Portland, Oregon
- National Register of Historic Places listings in Northwest Portland, Oregon
