= Alphabet Historic District =

Historic district in Oregon, United States

- U.S. National Register of Historic Places
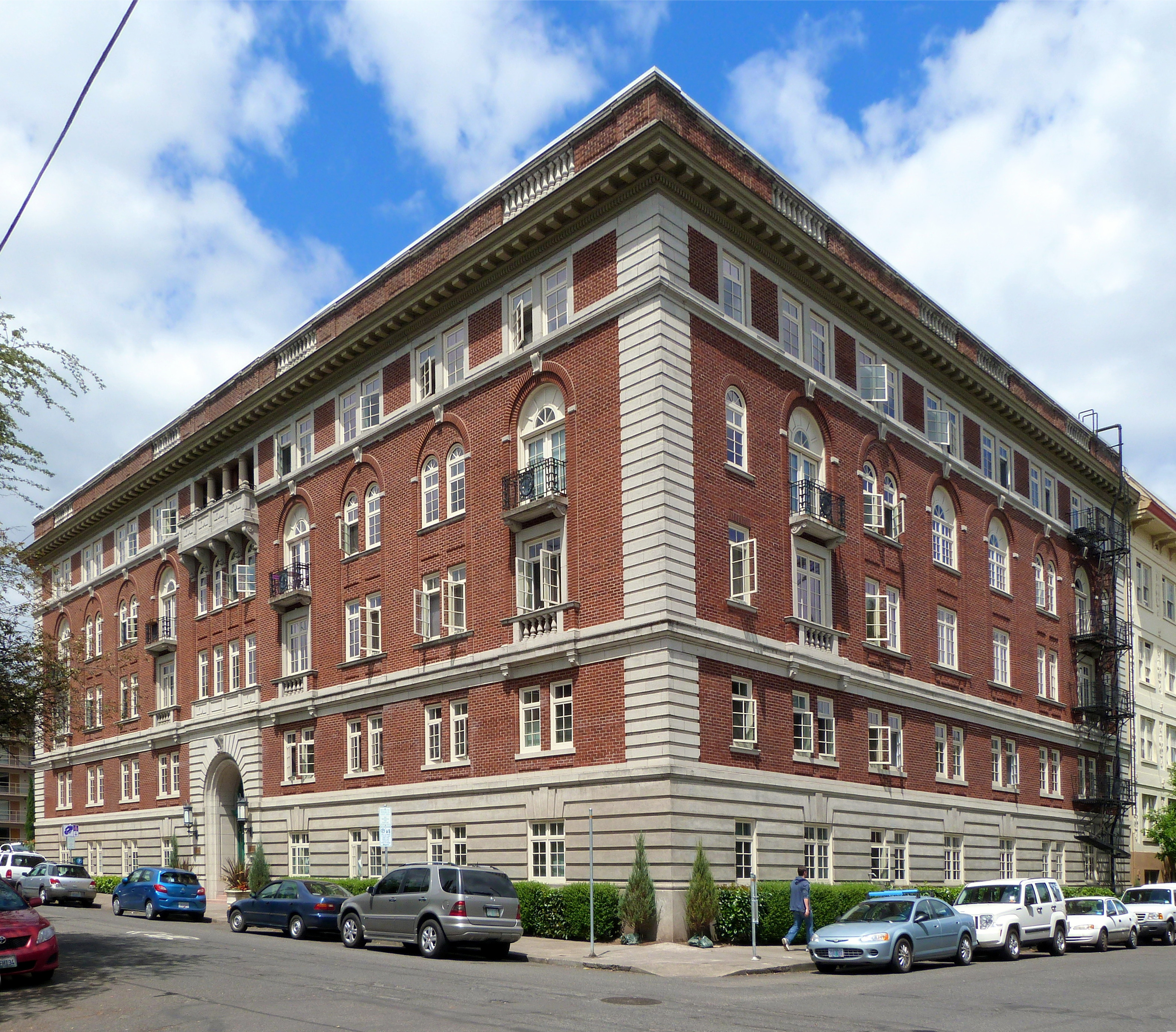
- Embassy Apartments

- Location within Oregon Location within the United States
- Location: Roughly bounded by NW Lovejoy St., NW Marshall St., NW 17th Ave., W. Burnside St., and NW 24th Ave., Portland, Oregon
- Coordinates: 45.527°N 122.692°W
- Area: 156.9 acres (63.5 ha)
- Architect: William B. Bell, et.al.
- Architectural style: Queen Anne, Bungalow/craftsman, et.al.
- NRHP reference No.: 00001293
- Added to NRHP: November 16, 2000

The Alphabet Historic District, is a historic district in the Northwest District of Portland, Oregon which was listed on the National Register of Historic Places in 2000. It is 156.9 acres (63.5 ha) in area and includes 478 contributing buildings. It is roughly bounded by NW Lovejoy St., NW Marshall St., NW 17th Ave., W. Burnside St., and NW 24th Ave.

It is an area zoned for historic preservation, about 50 blocks in size, extending roughly between NW 17th and 24th Avenues, and between W Burnside and NW Marshall Streets.

In 2000, the Alphabet Historic District, which covers parts of streets from Burnside ("B Street") to N.W. Marshall ("M Street") within the Alphabet District but not further, was added to the National Register of Historic Places.

The district includes about 50 buildings which are separately listed on the National Register. These include:

- George F. Heusner House
- Tudor Arms Apartments, designed by Carl L. Linde
- Trinity Place Apartments, luxury apartments including servants quarters
- Couch School
- Temple Beth Israel, designed by Edgar M. Lazarus
- Couch School/Metropolitan Learning Center

It also includes at least eight Portland Historic Landmarks:

- Lesser Cohen House
- Richard Koehler House
- C. H. Korell Houses#3 and 4
- Abbott Mills House
- Pope Investment Property
- St. Francis Apartments
- St. Mark's Episcopal Church

It includes or has other association with Portland West End Historic District and Portland Nob Hill Historic District.

Architect: William B. Bell et al. Architecture: Queen Anne, Bungalow/craftsman, et al. Historic function: Domestic; Social; Religion; Commerce/trade Historic subfunction: Single Dwelling; Multiple Dwelling; Civic; Religious Structure; Business Criteria: event, person, architecture/engineering
