= Theodore Roosevelt Memorial (Portland, Oregon) =

Lost monument and sculpture in Portland, Oregon

- Location: Portland, Oregon, United States
- Coordinates: 45.5135°N 122.6741°W
- Designer: Oliver L. Barrett
- Material: Tufa
- Height: 18 feet (5.5 m)
- Completion date: 1939
- Dedicated to: Theodore Roosevelt and Spanish–American War veterans
- Dismantled date: 1942

The Theodore Roosevelt Memorial is a lost monument and sculpture commemorating the 26th president of the United States, Theodore Roosevelt, as well as veterans of the Spanish–American War. It was originally installed in Portland's Battleship Oregon Park (now part of Tom McCall Waterfront Park). Designed by American artist Oliver L. Barrett, the 18-foot (5.5 m) memorial was erected in 1939, but disappeared in 1942 after being relocated temporarily during the construction of Harbor Drive. It featured a geometric tufa statue depicting a man not resembling Roosevelt, as well as a smaller realistic bas relief of him. The monument initially received a generally unfavorable reception, but was considered one of Barrett's best-known artworks.

== Description ==
Dubbed the "Colossus of Portland", the Theodore Roosevelt Memorial was designed by Oliver L. Barrett (1892–1943), a sculptor and professor at the University of Oregon. The 18-foot (5.5 m) tall monument was made of Central Oregon red tufa, weighed 16 short tons (15,000 kg), and commemorated veterans of the Spanish–American War.

The monument featured a statue of a man not resembling Theodore Roosevelt, the 26th president of the United States. According to Barrett, the modern work was "not designed as a likeness of Roosevelt or anyone else", but was rather "an attempt to symbolize his indomitable spirit—fighting, but constructive". According to Grant Butler of The Oregonian, "The statue wasn't a likeness of Roosevelt, but was a more generic figure that was meant to embody his spirit and determination, and was sculpted in the modern style". Barrett carved a smaller realistic profile of Roosevelt into the memorial's left side. An inscription on the base read: "Our nation holds in its hands the fate of the coming years". The monument has been described as "fascistic" because of its "severely geometric" contours.

== History ==
The memorial was commissioned by Spanish–American War veterans wanting to commemorate Roosevelt. On July 17, 1938, The Oregonian published the University of Oregon's announcement of the project, which confirmed Barrett's ongoing work at the Central Oregon rock source, near Bend, Oregon. The university said Barrett was creating a "heroic" statue of a "symbolic, robed figure, holding a sword" for the park's entrance, and confirmed the monument had a depiction of Roosevelt on one side and a memorial legend on the other. The announcement said the statue would be 14 feet (4.3 m) tall and capture "the spirit of courage, determination and audacity that accompanied the battleship Oregon on its historic dash and that inspired Theodore Roosevelt and his gallant men in the Spanish–American war". According to The Oregonian, the monument was erected "at the behest of the late Jay H. Upton, Bend attorney, the funds being derived from a residue of an appropriation to defray expenses of a Spanish–American war veterans' convention several years ago". Upton had also served as department commander of United Spanish War Veterans, a veterans' organization for the Spanish–American War, Philippine–American War, and China Relief Expedition.

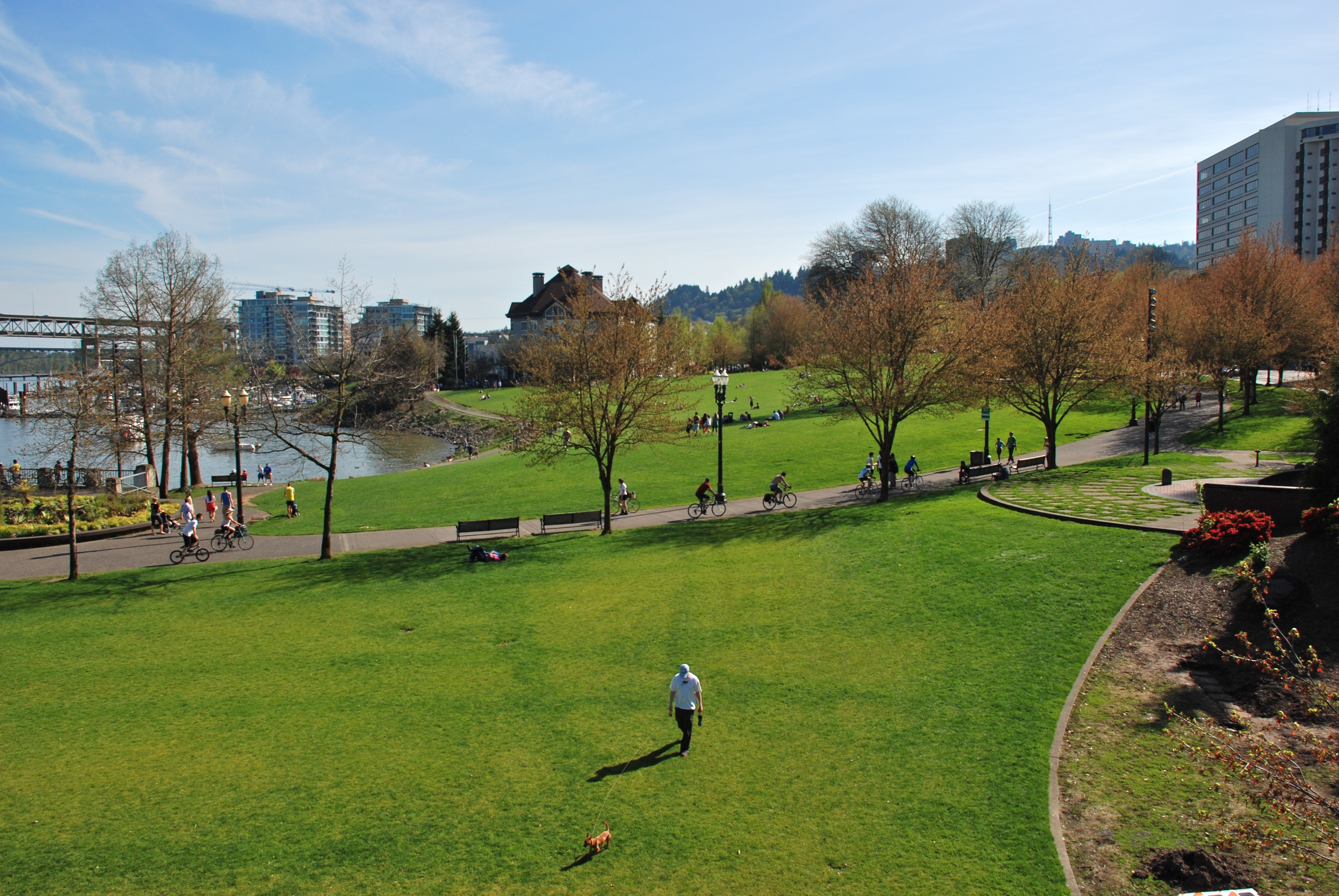
The monument was installed in Battleship Oregon Park in 1939, just south of the Hawthorne Bridge. The area is now part of Tom McCall Waterfront Park (pictured in 2012).

The memorial was installed in Battleship Oregon Park in February 1939, just south of the Hawthorne Bridge by Southwest Jefferson Street (now part of Tom McCall Waterfront Park). Following the installation, E. C. Sammons, chairman of the Battleship Oregon Memorial Fund, said he wished to "do away" with the monument. In 1941, he submitted a proposal to replace the memorial with the Skidmore Fountain, but both sculptures remained in their respective locations.

The construction of Harbor Drive required the artwork to be relocated temporarily. Workers were supposed to cut the monument into pieces and prepare them to cross the Willamette River for storage at the Stanton Yard facility. However, the memorial disappeared in 1942, and its exact method of removal and current whereabouts remain unknown. City officials attempted to locate the sculpture without success, and contemporary historians and art admirers have continued to search for answers. Portland did not maintain a record of public art at the time, and the memorial was not inventoried. Some local Spanish–American War veterans inquired about the monument's whereabouts. According to The Oregonian, "On the whole they apparently didn't think too highly of the memorial as art, but they nevertheless were a bit put out that the city had misplaced it". City officials considered moving Theodore Roosevelt, Rough Rider (1922)—Alexander Phimister Proctor's equestrian statue of Roosevelt installed in the South Park Blocks—to the site previously occupied by the Theodore Roosevelt Memorial, but nothing came to fruition.

In 1972, the city's property-control officer Don Eckton recalled, "I think I remember it cracked when they were taking it apart... It wouldn't surprise me a bit if it isn't underneath that highway", referring to Harbor Drive. Amy Platt, digital history manager at the Oregon Historical Society, has shared: "One theory is that it was demolished in place and buried in pieces in the park. Another is that some unknown person offered to haul it away and put it in a bunker somewhere."

== Reception ==
The memorial was reportedly an "instant landmark" upon its installation and a site not to be missed by visitors to downtown Portland. The Oregonian called the artwork "a man-sized controversy". Critics described the monument as "a Frankenstein's monster", "a monstrosity", and "bad art". Others said the statue was "stately" and resembled Benito Mussolini, the 27th Prime Minister of Italy. In 1945, following Barrett's death in 1943, Hermione Bain of The Register-Guard said the Theodore Roosevelt Memorial was one of the artist's best-known public artworks, along with Shemanski Fountain in Portland's South Park Blocks. The Oregonian published in 1983:

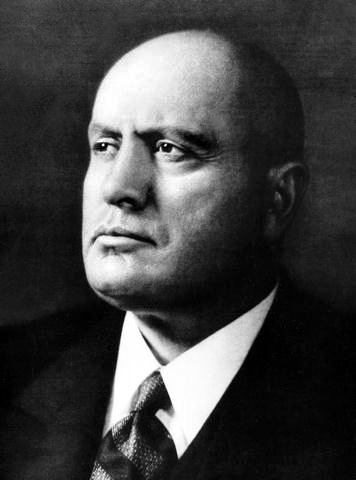
Some critics said the memorial's statue resembled Benito Mussolini (pictured).

When in February of '39 [Barrett's] work was unveiled ... the figure proved to be a massive, 14-foot-tall hunk of tufa, cubistically planed. What's more, rather than the heroic president it purported to honor, it resembled no less an anti-hero than Mussolini. The timing, with the Axis war boiling toward our shores, couldn't have been worse. 'A monstrosity!' the public roared. 'A Frankenstein!' The berated monster didn't hang around long. In 1941, during the reconstruction of the marine park, it was found necessary to move him temporarily to warehouse quarters. Though it would seem hard to lose such a massive man-stone, it was the last the figure was ever heard of or seen.

In 2017, Douglas Perry of The Oregonian described the memorial as "one of Portland's lost public-art masterpieces (or grotesque curiosities, depending on one's artistic taste)". The newspaper's Grant Butler included the monument in his overview of "14 Portland treasures trashed in the name of progress", and wrote, "if you look closely, it actually bears closest resemblance to the art deco figure of Academy Award trophies". Perry called the work "striking" in his 2018 overview of "29 only-in-Portland people and places you'll never see in the Rose City again". In 2019, he wrote: "The memorial was not well received... Most Portlanders shrugged when they learned the memorial had disappeared, if they learned about it at all. This was the statue, after all, that had been derided as 'uncommonly ugly' and 'apropos of nothing,' and it hadn't been around long enough to grow on people." Perry also opined:

Maybe Barrett's Theodore Roosevelt Memorial was ugly. Maybe its style did not fit its time. But it was a large-scale piece by a well-known Oregon artist, and it honored war veterans and one of America's greatest presidents. The monument, whatever critics thought of it, was arguably Barrett's most ambitious undertaking. Its disappearance deserved more than a collective shrug.

== See also ==
- Cultural depictions of Theodore Roosevelt
- List of Spanish–American War monuments and memorials
