= 2016 in science =

A number of significant scientific events occurred in 2016. The United Nations declared 2016 the International Year of Pulses.

== Events ==
=== January ===
- 1 January
  - Researchers at HRL Laboratories in Malibu, California, develop an entirely new way to 3D print near-flawless ceramics, including strongly heat-resistant varieties that were previously impossible.
  - An article published in Science describes how human-machine superintelligence could solve the world's most dire problems.

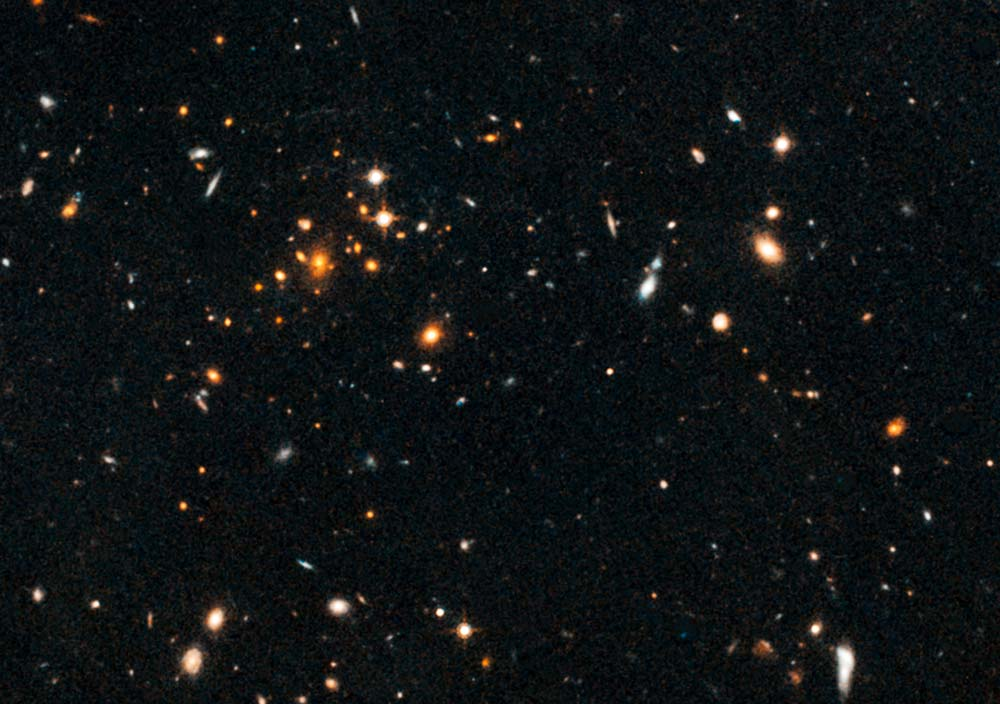
7 January: IDCS 1426, the most distant massive cluster of galaxies ever identified.

- 7 January
  - Scientists report that, about 800 million years ago, a minor genetic change in a single molecule, called GK-PID, may have allowed organisms to go from a single cell organism to one of many cells.
  - The discovery of the earliest known physical evidence of tea from the mausoleum of Emperor Jing of Han in Xi'an is reported, indicating that tea from the genus Camellia was drunk by Han Dynasty emperors as early as the 2nd century BC.
  - Astronomers identify IDCS 1426 as the most distant massive galaxy cluster yet discovered, at 10 billion light years from Earth.
  - Mathematicians, as part of the Great Internet Mersenne Prime Search, report the discovery of a new prime number: "2^{74,207,281} − 1".
- 11 January – Glycerol 3-phosphate phosphatase (G3PP), an enzyme that prevents sugar being stored as fat, is identified by scientists at the University of Montreal Hospital Research Centre.
- 13 January
  - Man-made carbon emissions have delayed the next ice age by 50,000 years, according to researchers at the Potsdam Institute for Climate Impact Research.
  - Water ice is confirmed on the surface of comet 67P.
  - The world's first 13 TB solid state drive (SSD) is announced, doubling the previous record for a commercially available SSD.
- 14 January – Astronomers report that ASASSN-15lh, first observed in June 2015, is likely the brightest supernova ever detected. Twice as luminous as the previous record holder, at peak detonation it was as bright as 570 billion Suns.
- 16 January – Astronaut Scott Kelly tweets a picture of the first flower ever grown in space, a zinnia flower.
- 17 January – The Jason-3 Earth observation satellite is launched.

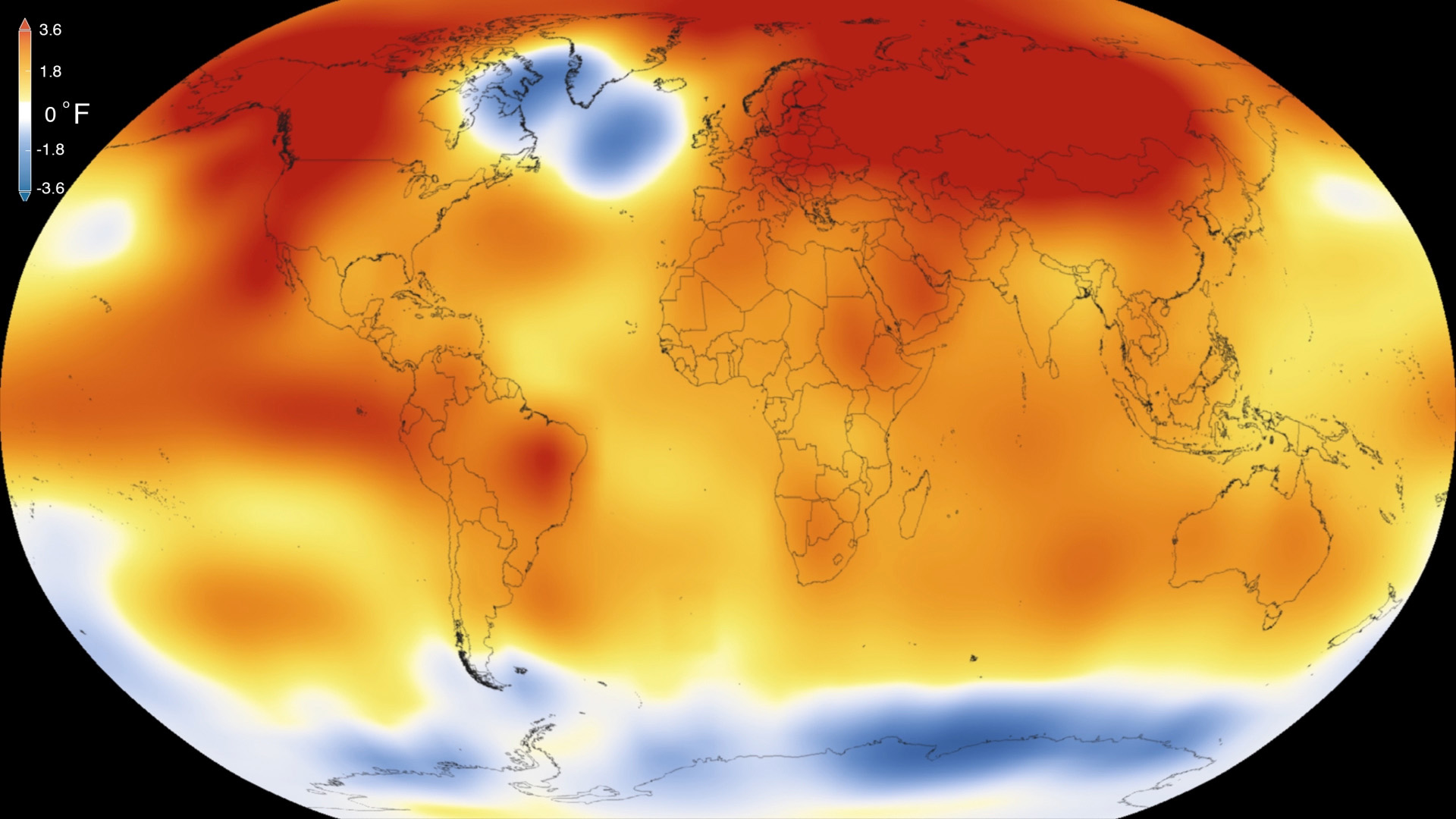
20 January: 2015 – Warmest Global Year on Record (since 1880) – Colors indicate temperature anomalies (NASA/NOAA; 20 January 2016).

- 18 January
  - Man-made heat entering the oceans has doubled since 1997, according to a study in the journal Nature Climate Change.
  - Light-activated nanoparticles able to kill over 90% of antibiotic-resistant bacteria are demonstrated at the University of Colorado Boulder.
  - Researchers demonstrate a new class of small, thin electronic sensors that monitor temperature and pressure within the skull – crucial health parameters after a brain injury or surgery – then melt away when no longer needed. This eliminates the need for additional surgery to remove the monitors and reduces the risk of infection and hemorrhage.
- 19 January
  - A successful head transplant on a monkey by scientists in China is reported.
  - DARPA announces a new program, Neural Engineering System Design (NESD), which aims to greatly improve the bandwidth and quality of neural interfaces, connecting up to a million neurons at a time.
- 20 January
  - Astronomers at the California Institute of Technology present the strongest evidence yet that a ninth planet is present in the Solar System, orbiting the Sun every 15,000 years.
  - NASA and the National Oceanic and Atmospheric Administration (NOAA) confirm that 2015 was the hottest year (since 1880) on record globally, shattering the previous record by the largest margin ever seen.
- 23 January – Lockheed Martin announces the "Segmented Planar Imaging Detector for Electro-optical Reconnaissance" (SPIDER), a new way of dramatically shrinking the size of telescopes, by using hundreds to thousands of tiny lenses. The diameter does not change, but the SPIDER system is thinner and does not need multiple mirrors.

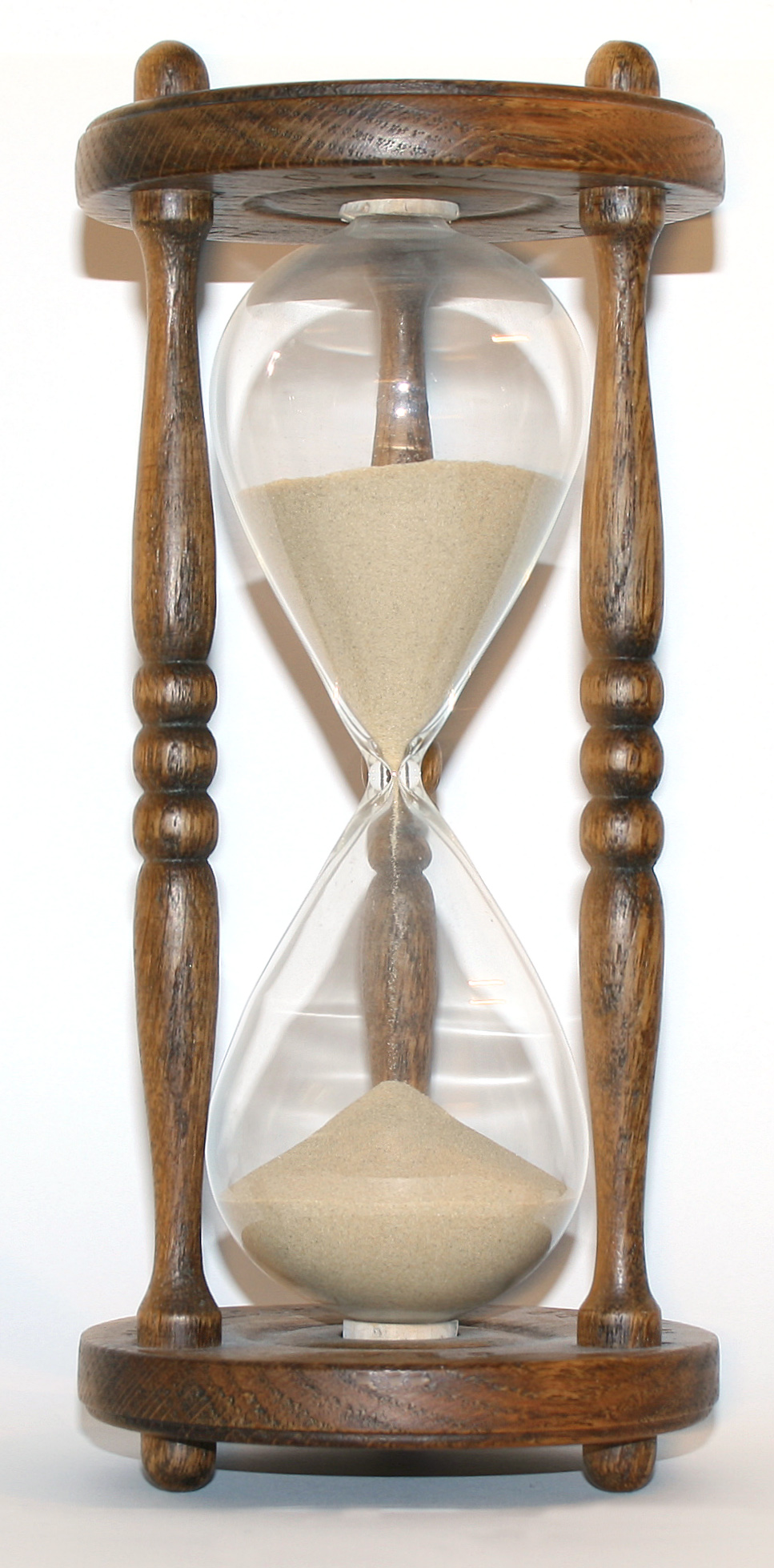
28 January: Studies suggest that a time reversal asymmetry may make the universe move forward in time.

- 25 January
  - Researchers at the University of Washington announce a new handheld, pen-sized microscope that could identify cancer cells in doctors' offices and operating rooms.
  - Researchers at the University of Iowa use real-time 3D videos of cellular movement to show how cancer cells extend "cables" and grab other cells, leading to tumour growth. As little as five percent of cancerous cells are needed for tumour formation, they suggest.
  - The first-ever global nitrogen footprint, encompassing 188 countries, is released by the University of Sydney.
  - The University of New South Wales announces that it will begin human trials of the Phoenix99, a fully implantable bionic eye.
- 27 January – Google announces a breakthrough in artificial intelligence with a program able to beat the European champion of the board game Go.
- 28 January
  - Research into the nature of time by Griffith University's Centre for Quantum Dynamics shows how an asymmetry for time reversal might be responsible for making the universe move forward in time.
  - Observations by the Space Telescope Science Institute in Baltimore, Maryland, suggest that Smith's Cloud did not originate from intergalactic space, but was actually launched out of our own galaxy around 70 million years ago.
- 29 January
  - Researchers demonstrate that graphene can be successfully interfaced with neurons, while maintaining the integrity of these vital nerve cells. It is believed this could lead to much improved brain implants for restoring sensory functions.
  - Proton beam therapy for cancer is as effective as other treatments and causes fewer side effects in children than conventional radiotherapy, according to research published by The Lancet.
  - Research by UCLA provides further evidence that the Moon was formed by a violent, head-on collision between the early Earth and a "planetary embryo" called Theia, roughly 100 million years after the Earth formed.

=== February ===
- 1 February – Scientists in the United Kingdom are given the go-ahead by regulators to genetically modify human embryos by using CRISPR-Cas9 and related techniques.
- 2 February – The smallest ever lattice structure is created by the Karlsruhe Institute of Technology (KIT), with glassy carbon struts and braces less than 200 nm in diameter.
- 3 February – Following a helium plasma test in December 2015, the first hydrogen test is successfully conducted at the Wendelstein 7-X fusion device in Germany.

11 February: Collision and merger of two black holes, resulting in the first direct observation of gravitational waves.

- 4 February – The National Snow and Ice Data Center reports that the Arctic sea ice extent for January 2016 was the lowest in the satellite record.
- 9 February – A breakthrough in cryopreservation is announced, with a rabbit's whole brain shown to have a well-preserved ultrastructure, including cell membranes, synapses, and intracellular structures such as synaptic vesicles.
- 11 February – Scientists at the LIGO, Virgo and GEO600 announce the first direct detection of a gravitational wave predicted by the general relativity theory of Albert Einstein.
- 12 February – Scientists publish a list of the world's 2,500 rarest minerals in the journal American Mineralogist.
- 15 February
  - The University of Southampton announces a major step forward in creating "5D" data storage that can survive for billions of years.
  - Scientists report "unprecedented" success using T-cells to treat cancer. In one trial, 94 percent of patients with acute lymphoblastic leukaemia saw their symptoms disappear entirely.
- 16 February
  - NASA's Hubble Space Telescope detects hydrogen and helium (and suggestions of hydrogen cyanide), but no water vapor, in the atmosphere of 55 Cancri e, the first time the atmosphere of a super-Earth exoplanet has been analyzed successfully.
  - A study in Cryobiology describes how microscopic tardigrades were successfully revived, and reproduced, after being frozen for over 30 years.
- 17 February – Launch of Hitomi, also known as Astro-H, a spacecraft to study high-energetic processes and dark matter in the universe.
- 19 February – Researchers report that naked mole rats, thought immune to cancer, can contract the disease after all.

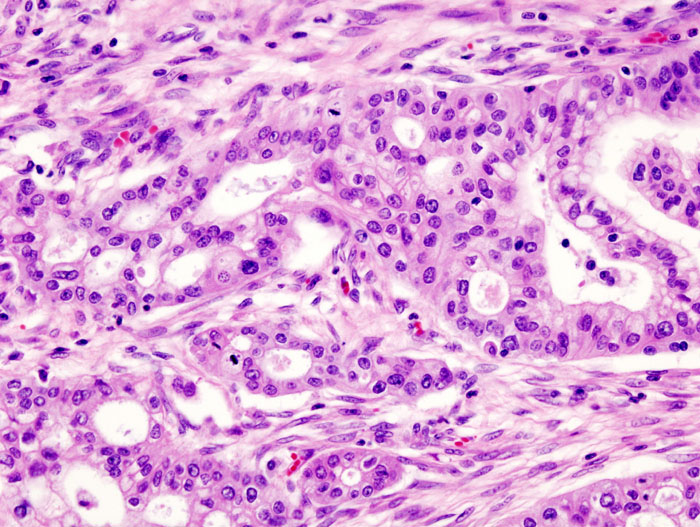
24 February: Pancreatic cancer is found to have four sub-types.

- 23 February – Boston Dynamics reveals the latest version of its "Atlas" humanoid robot, featuring highly dynamic movements and reactions in both indoor and outdoor environments.
- 24 February – Pancreatic cancer is found to have four separate sub-types, each with a different cause and requiring a different treatment.
- 26 February – A solar cell so thin, flexible, and lightweight that it can be draped on a soap bubble is demonstrated by the Massachusetts Institute of Technology.

=== March ===
- March – Connection between uncarboxylated osteocalcin and human metabolism identified by Gérard Karsenty.
- 1 March – Astronauts Scott Kelly and Mikhail Korniyenko return to Earth from spaceflight Soyuz TMA-18M, after spending 340 days in space, setting an ISS record.
- 2 March – Climate change could kill more than 500,000 people a year globally by 2050 by making their diets less healthy, according to research published in the Lancet.
- 3 March
  - The most remote galaxy ever detected – GN-z11 – is confirmed by the Hubble Space Telescope at a distance of 13.4 billion light years.
  - The global average temperature briefly spikes 2 degrees C above the pre-industrial average, considered by most countries to be the "dangerous" limit for climate change.
- 4 March – University of Cambridge scientists demonstrate that 'naïve' pluripotent stem cells can be derived from a human embryo. One of the most flexible types of stem cell, these can develop into all human tissue other than the placenta.
- 7 March – German researchers identify a specific gene mutation in humans that provides a 50 percent lower risk of suffering a heart attack.
- 9 March
  - NASA announces that the robotic Mars InSight lander, equipped with a seismometer and a heat transfer probe, has been approved for a 5 May 2018 launch date. The original launch date in this month was cancelled in December 2015 due to a technical failure.
  - Google's DeepMind AlphaGo artificial intelligence defeats South Korea's Lee Se-dol in the first of a series of Go games in Seoul.
  - A total solar eclipse occurred.

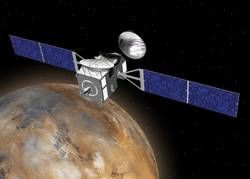
14 March: ExoMars Trace Gas Orbiter is launched.

- 10 March – Data from Mauna Loa Observatory in Hawaii shows that carbon emissions in 2015 grew at their fastest rate on record.
- 11 March – Ideonella sakaiensis, the first species of bacteria able to degrade polyethylene terephthalate, (PET) is described by Japanese researchers.
- 14 March – ExoMars Trace Gas Orbiter is launched from Baikonur in Kazakhstan at 09:31 GMT.
- 15 March – Fairy circle (arid grass formation) patterns in spinifex are discovered in remote Western Australia; their first discovery outside of Namibia.
- 17 March
  - Paleontologists report the discovery of a pregnant Tyrannosaurus rex, shedding light on the evolution of egg-laying as well as gender differences in the dinosaur.
  - Researchers at Rutgers and Stanford universities develop a novel way to inject healthy human nerve cells into mouse brains, with potential for treating Parkinson's disease and other brain-related conditions, though human trials are likely 10–20 years away.
  - Studies suggest that modern humans bred with hominins, including Denisovans and Neanderthals, on multiple occasions.
  - Researchers at the University of Toronto use stem cell therapy to reverse age-related osteoporosis in mice.
- 21 March – Man-made carbon emissions lead to total carbon emissions 10 times higher than at any point since the extinction of the dinosaurs, according to new calculations by researchers.
- 24 March
  - Scientists at Florida Atlantic University identify translin as a gene responsible for sleep deprivation and metabolic disorders.
  - The cavefish Cryptotora thamicola, able to walk and climb waterfalls, is reported to show anatomical features previously known only in four-limbed vertebrates. Researchers call the finding "huge" in evolutionary terms.

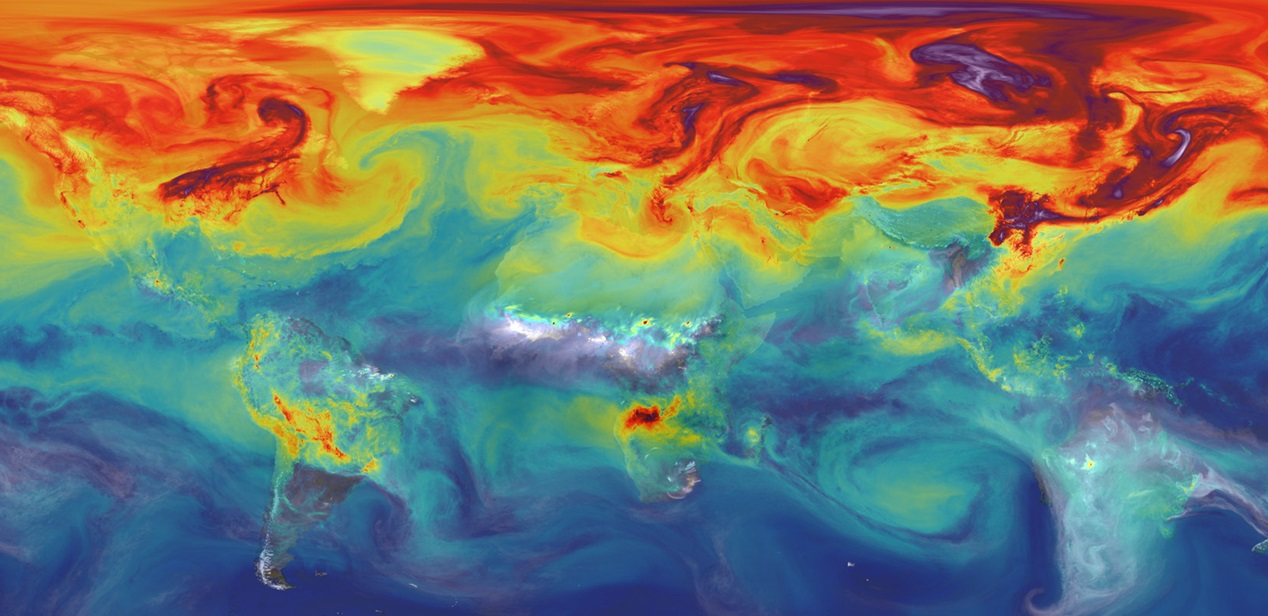
21 March: Total carbon emissions due to humans 10 times greater than at any time since the extinction of the dinosaurs.

  - Craig Venter's team announce they have synthesised a minimal bacterial genome, containing only the genes necessary for life, and consisting of just 473 genes. This builds upon their earlier research that synthesised Mycoplasma laboratorium in 2010.
- 29 March – Case Western Reserve University announces an optical sensor a million times more sensitive than the current best available, with potential for improving early cancer detection.
- 30 March
  - A study by climate scientists concludes that sea level increases by 2100 could be twice as high as the IPCC's most recent estimates.
  - Scientists report that Homo floresiensis, an extinct hominin nicknamed the "hobbit", disappeared about 50,000 years ago, much earlier than the 12,000 years ago estimated initially.
  - A study by MIT predicts that much of Asia will be at high risk of severe water stress by 2050, with an extra billion more people becoming water stressed compared to today.
- 31 March – Astronomers report the discovery of a unique white dwarf star – designated SDSS J1240+6710 – which has a 99.9 percent oxygen atmosphere.

=== April ===
- 1 April – A study by the University of Southern California concludes that drinking even moderate amounts of coffee can significantly reduce the risk of developing colorectal cancer.
- 4 April
  - Researchers found the fossil of Aquilonifer spinosus covered in carbonate from a formation called the Herefordshire Lagerstätte in UK.
  - A new quantum state of matter is discovered in a graphene-like magnetic material RuCl_{3} hosting curious magnetic quasiparticles called Majorana fermions which are their own antiparticles. It is a step forward in materials which will allow quantum computation.
- 7 April
  - A new analysis of clouds and their role in global warming reveals they contain more liquid water (as opposed to ice) than previously thought. This makes them less reflective and therefore results in more heat reaching the Earth's surface, meaning that future temperature increases may have been underestimated.
  - A new method to produce transistors is presented, based on nanocrystal 'inks'. This allows them to be produced on flexible surfaces, possibly with 3D printers.
- 8 April – SpaceX successfully lands the first stage of a Falcon 9 rocket (SpaceX CRS-8) on a floating drone ship for the first time.

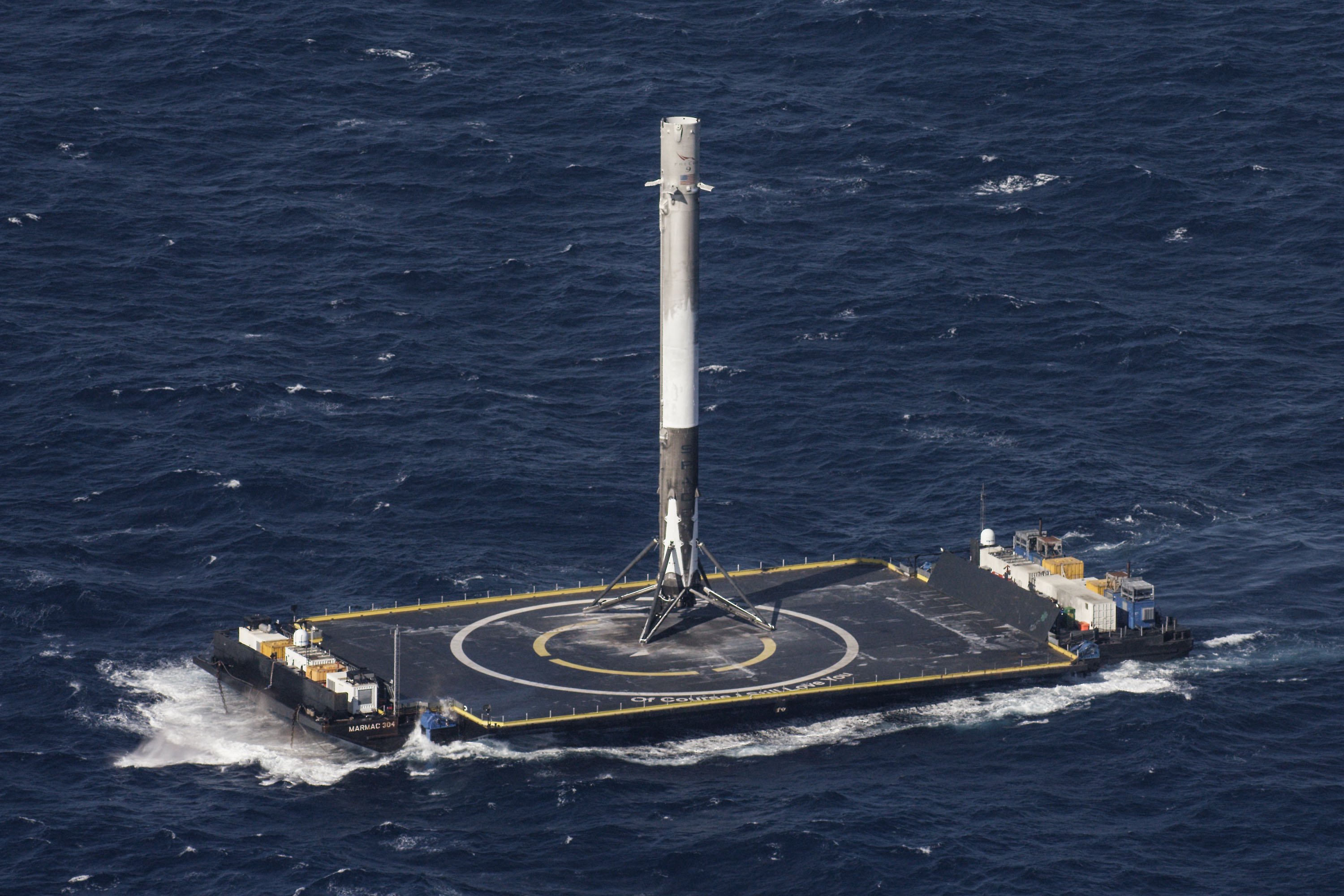
8 April: First stage of Falcon 9 rocket landed on floating autonomous droneship.

- 9 April – By adding a one-atom thick layer of graphene to solar panels, Chinese scientists report that electricity can be generated from raindrops.
- 11 April – Scientists announce an updated biological "tree of life" summarizing the evolution of all known life forms, and find that the branches of the new overview, based on the latest genetic findings, are mainly composed of bacteria.
- 12 April – Scientists announce Breakthrough Starshot, a Breakthrough Initiatives program, to develop a proof-of-concept fleet of small centimeter-sized light sail spacecraft, named StarChip, capable of making the journey to Alpha Centauri, the nearest star system, at speeds of 20% and 15% of the speed of light, taking between 20 and 30 years to reach the star system, respectively, and about 4 years to notify Earth of a successful arrival.
- 13 April
  - A quadriplegic man, Ian Burkhart from Ohio, is able to perform complex functional movements with his fingers after a chip was implanted in his brain.
  - Astronomers report the discovery of Crater 2, the fourth largest satellite galaxy of the Milky Way, at a distance of 380,000 light years.
  - An international team reports synthesising ultra-long carbyne inside double-walled nanotubes. This exotic form of carbon is even stronger than graphene.
- 14 April – The discovery of hormone asprosin is reported in Cell.

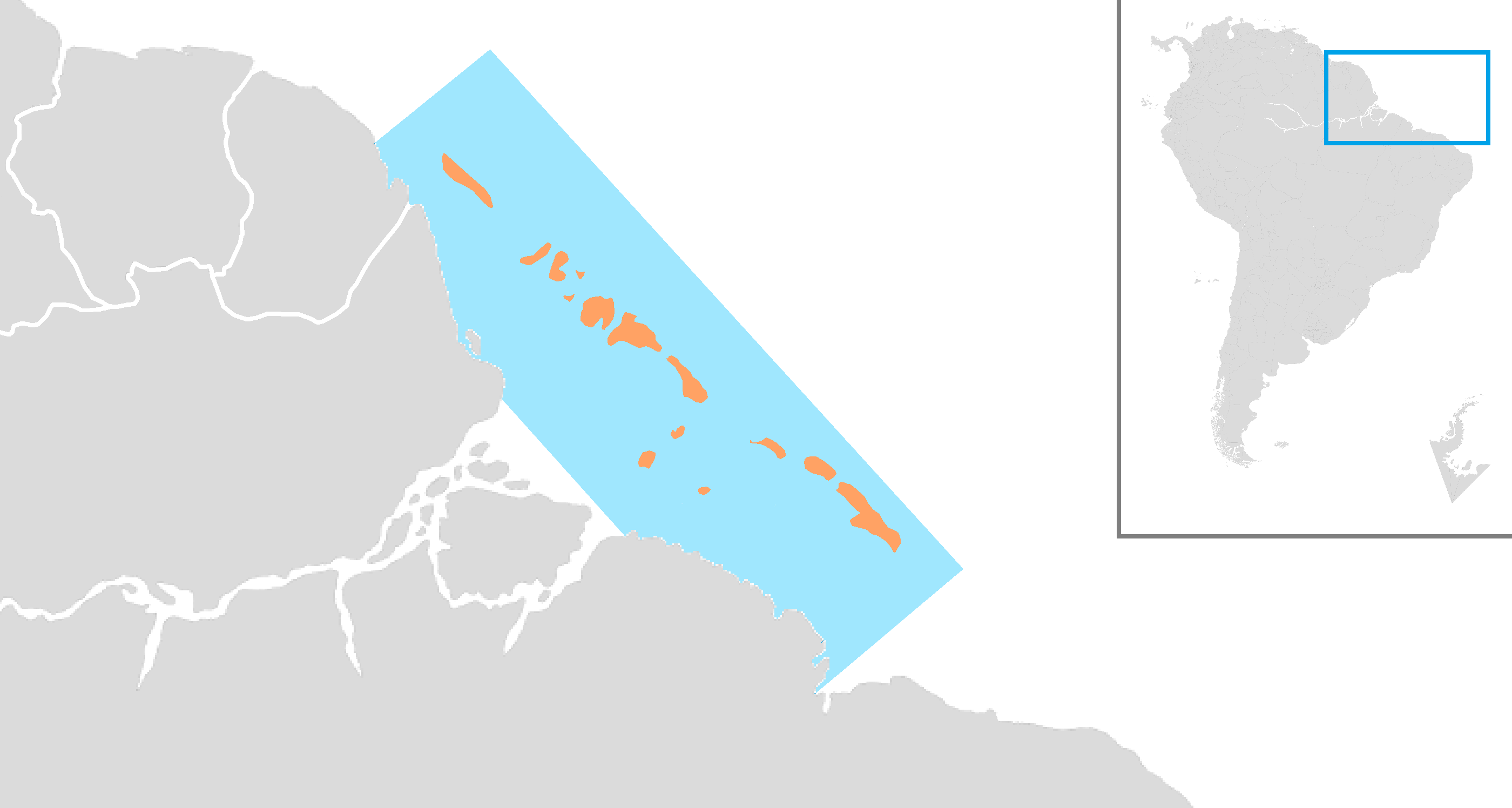
22 April: Map showing an extensive reef system near the Amazon River.

- 21 April – BioViva USA reports the first successful use of gene therapy to extend the length of telomeres in a human patient.
- 22 April
  - The discovery of quantum tunneling of water molecules is reported.
  - Scientists announce the discovery of an extensive reef system near the Amazon River, covering an estimated 3,600 square miles (9,300 km^{2}).
- 26 April – Astronomers using the Hubble Space Telescope report the discovery of a moon orbiting the remote dwarf planet Makemake.
- 28 April
  - Scientists identify a pair of molecular signals controlling skin and hair colour, which could be targeted by new drugs to treat skin pigment disorders like vitiligo.
  - A new paper in Astrobiology suggests there could be a way to simplify the Drake equation, based on observations of exoplanets discovered in the last two decades.
- 29 April – A team at Stanford University reveals "OceanOne", a humanoid robot capable of moving around the seabed using thrusters.

=== May ===
- 2 May
  - Researchers of the Max Planck Institute for Chemistry and the Cyprus Institute in Nicosia calculate that in future decades, the Middle East and North Africa could become so hot that human habitability is compromised.
  - Researchers at the University of Illinois and University of Puerto Rico announce they have sequenced the mitochondrial genome for the Hispaniolan solenodon, a venomous mammal found only on Hispaniola. Their findings confirm that the species diverged from all other living mammals about 78 million years ago, before dinosaurs went extinct.
  - Astronomers discover three potentially Earth-like planets in the habitable zone of an ultracool brown dwarf star (TRAPPIST-1) just 40 light years away from Earth.
  - A study in PNAS concludes that Earth may be home to 1 trillion species, with 99.999 percent remaining undiscovered.

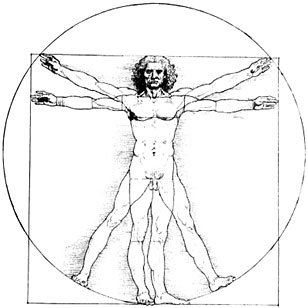
13 May: Synthesizing a human genome considered, and later, 2 June, formally announced.

- 4 May – The most detailed ever study of leopard populations reveals that the animals have lost 75% of their historical habitat range since 1750.
- 9 May
  - A transit of Mercury occurs.
  - Oxygen is detected in the Martian atmosphere for the first time in 40 years.
- 10 May
  - NASA's Kepler mission verifies 1,284 new exoplanets – the single largest finding of planets to date.
  - Samsung announces a 256 gigabyte microSD card.
- 13 May – Scientists consider extending the Human Genome Project to include creating a synthetic human genome.
- 16 May – NASA confirms that April 2016 was the hottest April ever recorded, beating the previous record set in 2010 by 0.24 °C, the largest margin ever.
- 17 May
  - Scientists at IBM Research announce a storage memory breakthrough by reliably storing three bits of data per cell using a new memory technology known as phase-change memory (PCM). The results could provide fast and easy storage to capture the exponential growth of data in the future.
  - A detailed report by the National Academies of Sciences, Engineering, and Medicine finds no risk to human health from genetic modifications of food.
  - Researchers at the University of Virginia Health System find that the Oct4 gene, once thought to be inactive in adults, actually plays a vital role in preventing heart attacks and strokes. The gene could delay at least some of the effects of aging.
- 18 May
  - At the I/O developer conference, Google reveals it has been working on a new chip, known as the Tensor Processing Unit (TPU), which delivers "an order of magnitude higher performance per watt than all commercially available GPUs and FPGA."
  - A study of Totten Glacier, East Antarctica's largest outlet of ice, reveals that its melting could pass a critical threshold within the next century, entering a period of irreversible retreat and ultimately adding nearly three metres to global sea levels.
- 19 May – Scientists in the US report evidence that tsunamis up to 120m high swept across Mars in the ancient past.

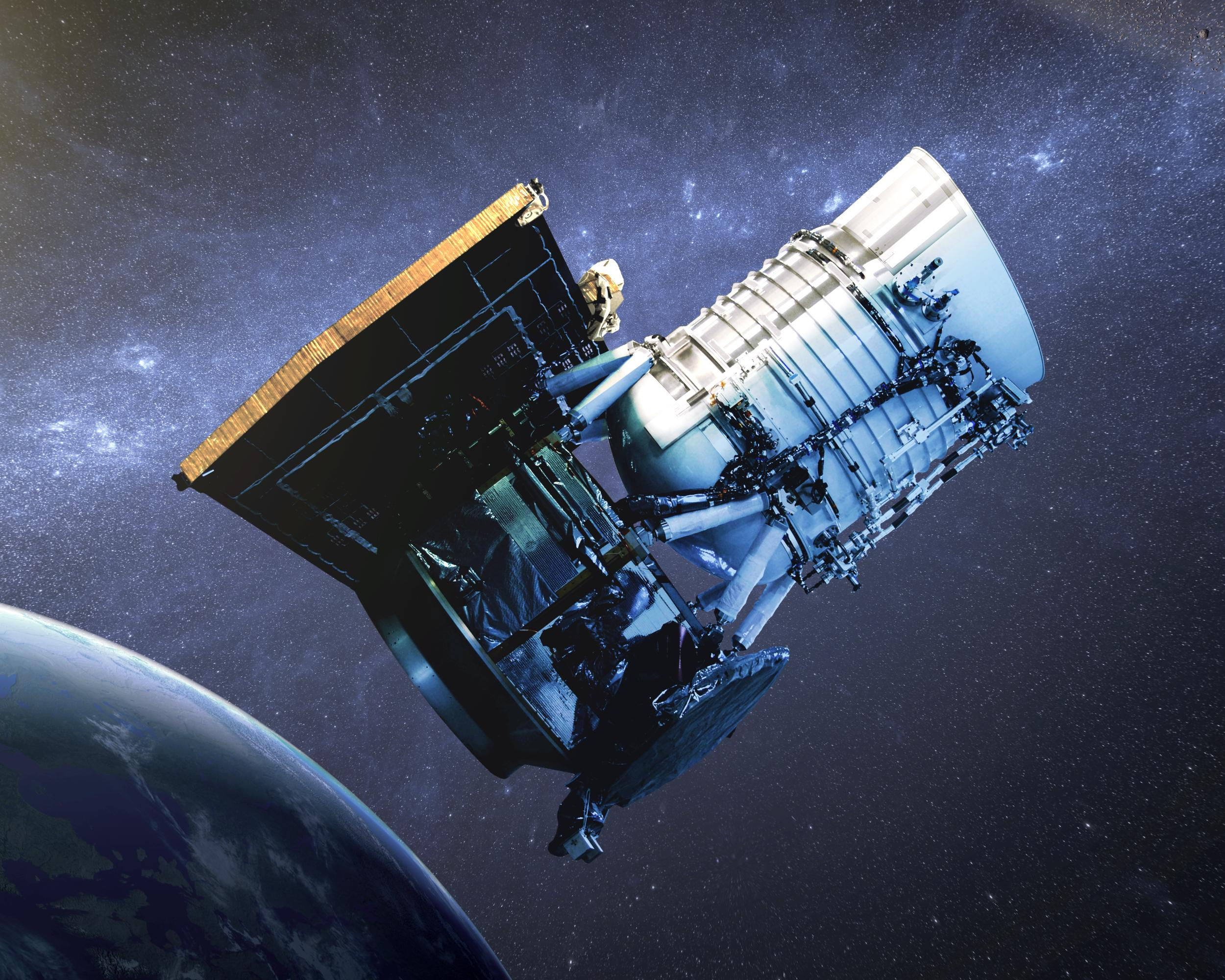
23 May: Significant asteroid data from the WISE and NEOWISE missions questioned.

- 23 May
  - India conducts the first successful launch of a new space plane, called the Reusable Launch Vehicle (RLV), which is delivered to a height of 65 kilometres (40 mi).
  - Significant asteroid data arising from the Wide-field Infrared Survey Explorer and NEOWISE missions is questioned, but the criticism did not undergo peer review yet. On 22 May 2018, a more recent peer-reviewed follow-up study is subsequently published.
- 24 May – A survey of 216,000 adolescents from all 50 US states finds the number of teens with marijuana-related problems is declining and marijuana use is falling, despite the fact that more US states are legalising or decriminalising the drug.
- 25 May – Researchers discover new evidence that amyloid-beta protein acts as a natural antibiotic in the brain: Alzheimer's-associated amyloid plaques may be a normal part of the immune system, and removing amyloid could actually be harmful.
- 26 May – Evidence of a recent, extreme ice age on Mars is published in the journal Science. Just 370,000 years ago, the planet would have appeared more white than red, the authors say.
- 27 May – Strimvelis, an ex-vivo stem cell gene therapy for adenosine deaminase deficiency, and the first gene therapy for children, is granted regulatory approval by the European Commission.

=== June ===
- 1 June
  - Worldwide, renewable energy grew at its fastest ever rate in 2015, according to a report by the Renewable Energy Policy Network for the 21st Century (REN21).
  - Scientists at Rice University characterise how single-molecule "nanocars" move in open air, which they claim will help the kinetics of molecular machines in ambient conditions over time.
- 2 June
  - Scientists formally announce HGP-Write, a plan to synthesize the human genome.
  - A Stanford clinical trial finds that stem cells injected directly into the brain of chronic stroke sufferers revived dead brain circuits and restored patients' ability to walk.

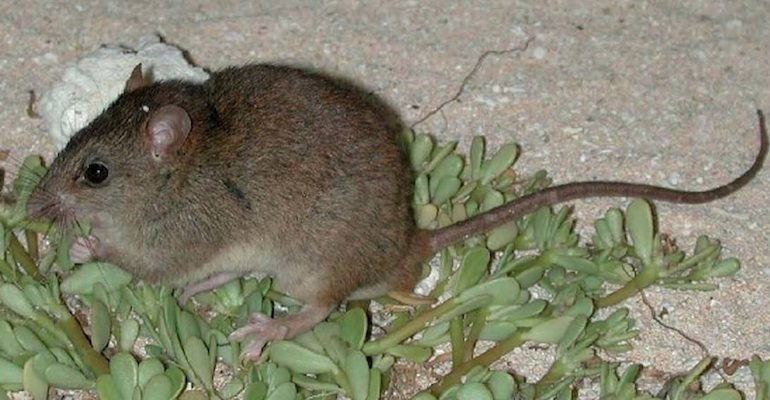
14 June: Bramble Cay melomys, reported to be the first recorded mammal to become extinct due to anthropogenic climate change.

- 3 June
  - NASA and ESA jointly announce that the Universe is expanding 5% to 9% faster than previously thought, after using the Hubble Space Telescope to measure the distance to stars in 19 galaxies beyond the Milky Way.
  - A new combination of chemotherapy drugs for pancreatic cancer, presented at the world's biggest cancer conference, shows long-term survival could be increased from 16% to 29%.
- 7 June – The National Snow and Ice Data Center reports that the Arctic sea ice extent was the lowest on record for May by an unusually wide margin.
- 8 June – The IUPAC proposes the final names of four new chemical elements on the periodic table: nihonium, moscovium, tennessine, and oganesson.
- 9 June – A way of pumping CO_{2} underground and turning it from a gas into solid carbonate minerals is demonstrated in Iceland, offering a potentially better method of carbon capture and storage.
- 13 June – Researchers at the University of Cambridge demonstrate a hybrid of excited molecules and molecules plus emitted light, created at room temperature.
- 14 June – Researchers from Queensland's Department of Environment and Heritage Protection, and the University of Queensland jointly report that the Bramble Cay melomys is likely extinct, adding: "Significantly, this probably represents the first recorded mammalian extinction due to anthropogenic climate change."
- 15 June
  - Scientists announce detecting a second gravitational wave event (GW151226) resulting from the collision of black holes.
  - NASA astronomers announce the discovery of 469219 Kamoʻoalewa (then known as 2016 HO3), an asteroid first observed on 27 April 2016, that is considered the best and most stable example to date of a constant near-Earth companion, or "quasi-satellite" of Earth.

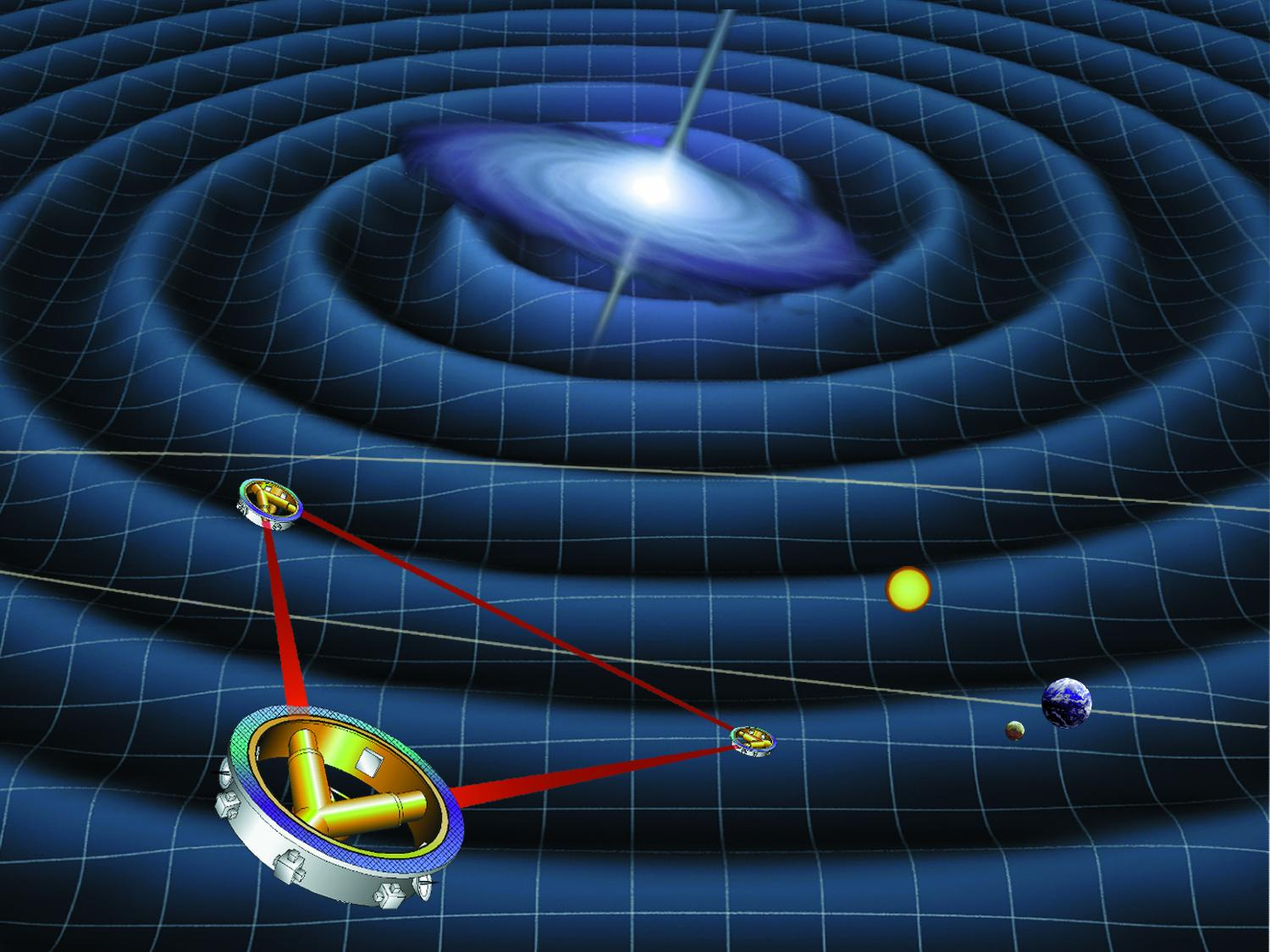
15 June: Second gravitational wave (GW151226) detected.

- 16 June – Researchers at Massachusetts General Hospital announce a new method for long-term culturing of adult stem cells.
- 20 June
  - China introduces the Sunway TaihuLight, the world's fastest supercomputer, capable of 93 petaflops and a peak performance of 125 petaflops.
  - Astronomers discover that the galaxy Dragonfly 44 consists of 99.99% dark matter, much more than in all other known galaxies.
- 23 June – Dutch scientists announce that crops of four vegetables and cereals grown in soil similar to that on Mars are safe to eat.
- 29 June – NASA scientists report that the bright spot in Occator crater on the dwarf planet Ceres may be mostly sodium carbonate (Na_{2}CO_{3}).
- 30 June – The first known death caused by a self-driving car is disclosed by Tesla Motors.

=== July ===
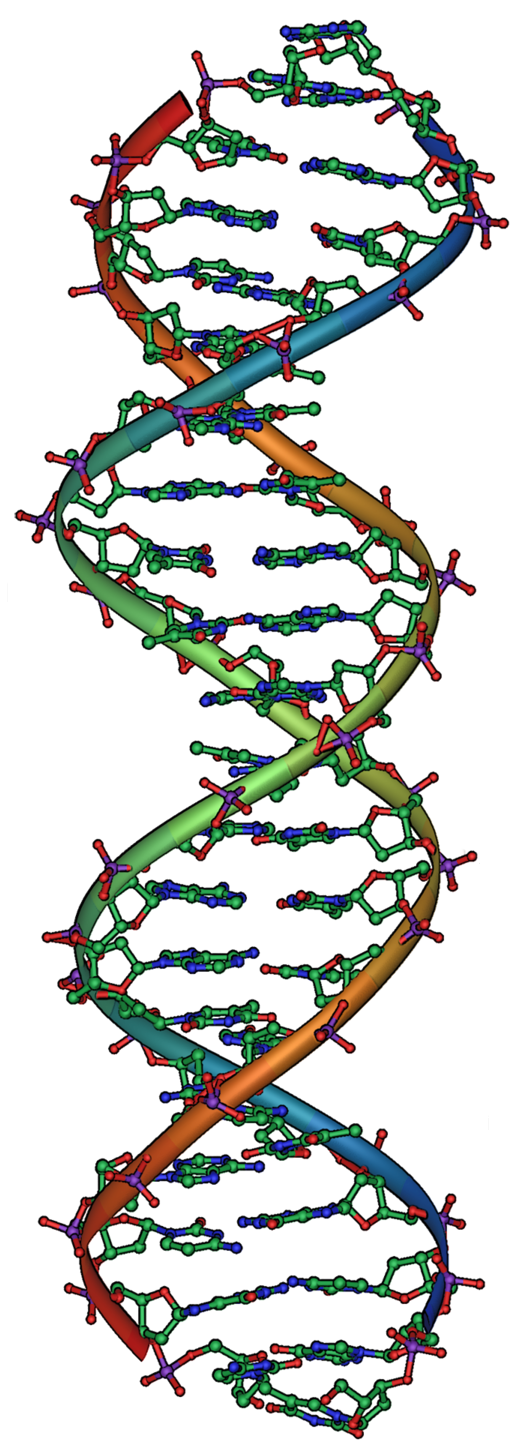
25 July: 355 genes of LUCA found for all organisms living on Earth.

- 1 July – A new family of tetraquark particles – named X(4140), X(4274), X(4500), and X(4700) – is announced by researchers at the Large Hadron Collider.
- 4 July – NASA scientists announce the arrival of the Juno spacecraft at the planet Jupiter.
- 5 July – China completes construction on the world's largest radio telescope.
- 11 July – Astronomers announce the discovery of 2015 RR245, a dwarf planet candidate in the Kuiper Belt with a highly elliptical 700-year orbit.
- 13 July – U.S. and Indian scientists report that graphene-infused packaging is a million times better at blocking moisture than typical plastic.
- 20 July
  - Using the Hubble telescope, scientists perform the first spectroscopy of the atmospheres of Earth-sized exoplanets (orbiting TRAPPIST-1).
  - Scientists at Rice University announce a new titanium-gold alloy that is four times harder than most steels.
- 21 July – The hottest ever temperature in the Eastern Hemisphere is reported, with Mitribah, Kuwait reaching 54 °C (129.2 °F). This is second only to Death Valley in California, which saw 56.7 °C (134.1 °F) in 1913.
- 25 July
  - Scientists report identifying a set of 355 genes from the Last Universal Common Ancestor (LUCA) of all organisms living on Earth.
  - Sex hormones can stimulate production of telomerase, an enzyme naturally found in the human organism, new research shows.
- 26 July – Solar Impulse 2 becomes the first solar-powered aircraft to circumnavigate the Earth.
- 27 July
  - Neonicotinoids, the world's most widely used insecticide, are found to reduce bee sperm counts by almost 40%, as well as cutting the lifespan of bee drones by a third.
  - Researchers in Germany discover that bacteria from the human nose produces a novel antibiotic which is effective against multiresistant pathogens.
  - Current levels of atmospheric greenhouse gases already commit the planet to air temperatures over many land regions being eventually warmed by greater than 1.5 degrees Celsius, according to new research.
- 28 July – A new "vortex" laser that travels in a corkscrew pattern is shown to carry 10 times or more the information of conventional lasers, potentially offering a way to extend Moore's Law.
- 29 July – The seafloor in the Clarion–Clipperton zone – an area in the Pacific Ocean being targeted for deep-sea mining – is found to contain an abundance and diversity of life, with more than half of the species collected being new to science.

=== August ===
- 1 August – Using the DNA from over 450,000 customers of gene-testing company 23andMe, researchers identify for the first time 15 regions of the genome associated with depression.
- 3 August – Researchers pinpoint which of the more than 4,000 exoplanet candidates discovered by NASA's Kepler mission are most likely to be similar to Earth. Their research outlines 216 Kepler planets located within the 'habitable zone', of which 20 are the best candidates to be habitable rocky planets like Earth.
- 4 August – A team at the University of Oxford achieves a quantum logic gate with record-breaking 99.9% precision, reaching the benchmark required to build a quantum computer.
- 5 August
  - Analysis of an increased dataset at the Large Hadron Collider suggests that the 750 GeV diphoton excess observed in 2015 was probably just a statistical fluctuation.
  - Research by Imperial College London suggests that a new form of light can be created by binding it to a single electron, combining the properties of both.

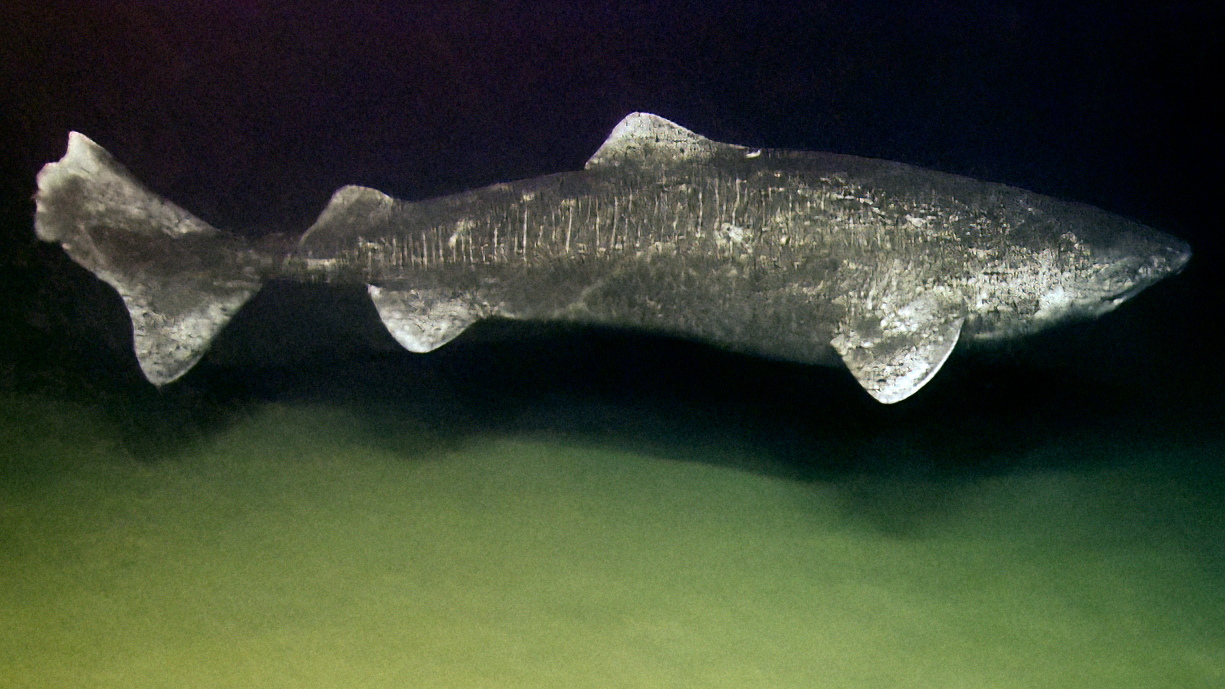
11 August: Greenland shark found to be the longest-lived vertebrate on Earth, capable of living nearly 400 years.

- 6 August – Engineers at the University of California, Berkeley, create the first dust-sized wireless sensors that may be implanted within the body.
- 8 August – New research by Stanford University suggests that phase-change memory can be engineered to be 1,000 times faster, while using less energy and requiring less space.
- 11 August
  - Venus may have been habitable in the ancient past, with a shallow liquid-water ocean and much lower temperatures than today, according to NASA climate models.
  - The Greenland shark (Somniosus microcephalus) is found to be the longest-lived vertebrate, able to reach a lifespan of nearly 400 years.
- 12 August – Researchers at University College London devise a software algorithm able to scan and replicate almost anyone's handwriting.
- 15 August
  - NASA reports that July 2016 was the hottest single month in recorded history (going back to 1880), at 1.51 degrees Fahrenheit (0.84 degrees Celsius) above the 1950-1980 global average.
  - NASA confirms that fracking is responsible for a huge methane hot spot in the United States.
  - A possible new subatomic particle could provide evidence of a fifth fundamental force of nature, according to research published in Physical Review Letters by scientists at the University of California, Irvine.
  - Replacing tropical lowland forests with palm oil plantations can damage 11 out of 14 functions of a healthy ecosystem, some of which will be irreparable, concludes a study by the Helmholtz Centre For Environmental Research.
- 16 August – MIT announces a breakthrough which can double lithium-ion battery capacity.
- 22 August – Researchers at Princeton demonstrate an open source 25-core chip that can easily be scaled to create a 200,000-core computer.

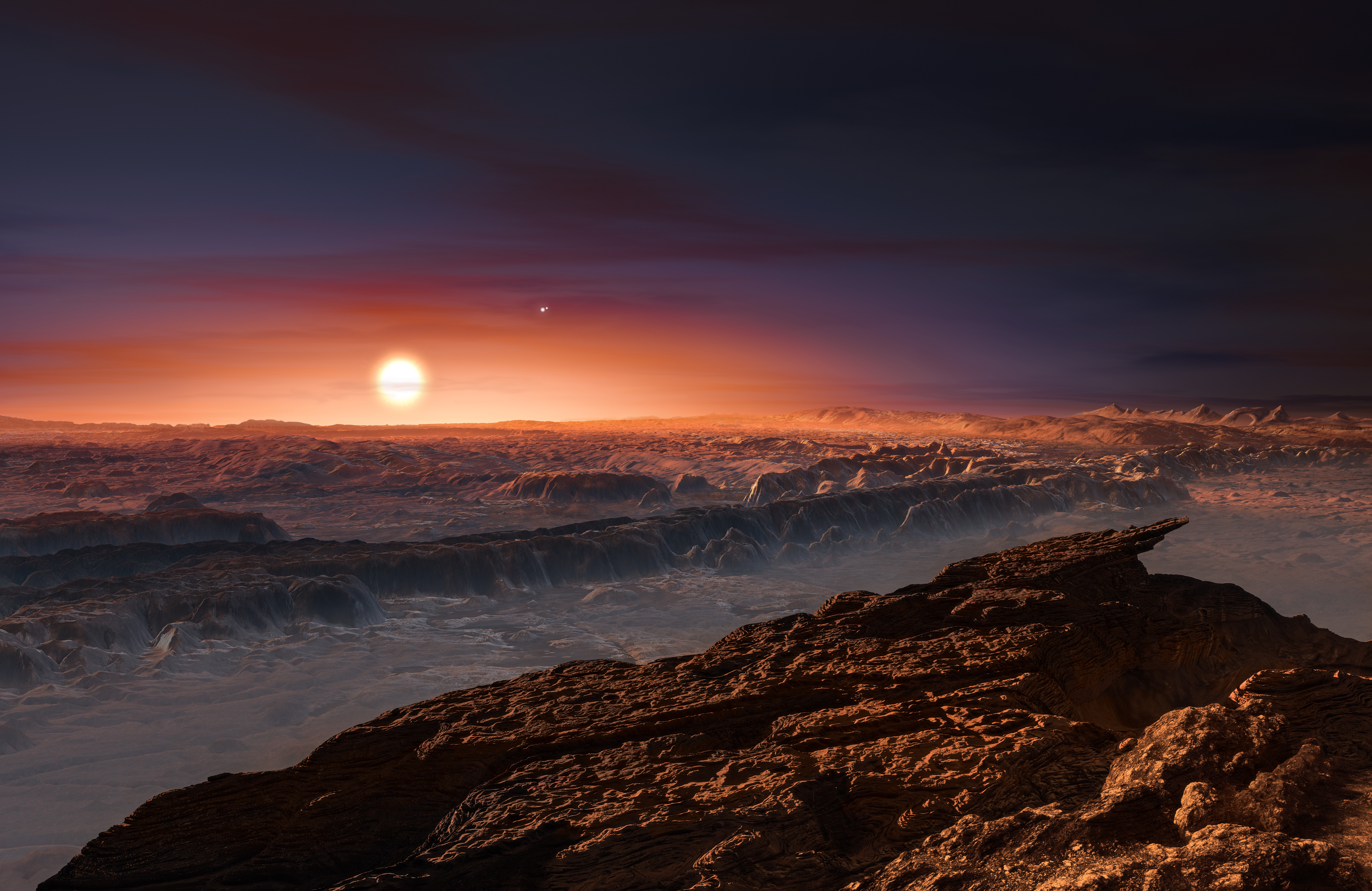
24 August: Artist's impression of Proxima b, an Earth-sized exoplanet detected in the habitable zone of Proxima Centauri, the closest star to the Sun - possible destination of the StarChip spacecraft.

- 24 August – Astronomers announce the detection of Proxima b, an Earth-sized exoplanet that is in the habitable zone of the red dwarf star Proxima Centauri, the closest star to the Sun. Due to its closeness to Earth, Proxima b may be a flyby destination for a fleet of interstellar StarChip spacecraft currently being developed by the Breakthrough Starshot project.
- 25 August – Astronomers report that Dragonfly 44, an ultra diffuse galaxy (UDG) with the mass of the Milky Way galaxy, but with nearly no discernable stars or galactic structure, might be made almost entirely of dark matter.
- 26 August – The University of Washington and The Nature Conservancy publish an animated map showing where mammals, birds and amphibians are projected to move in the Western Hemisphere in response to climate change.
- 27 August – NASA's Juno probe makes a close pass of Jupiter, coming within 4,200 km (2,600 mi) of the cloud tops – the closest any spacecraft has ever approached the gas giant without entering its atmosphere.
- 28 August
  - HI-SEAS IV, the latest Hawaii Space Exploration Analog and Simulation, an experiment to simulate a human colony on Mars, concludes after exactly one year.
  - DNA is sequenced in outer space for the first time, with NASA astronaut Kate Rubins using a MinION device aboard the International Space Station.
- 31 August
  - The world's oldest known fossils, which may be stromatolites, are claimed to have been found on a wavy rock feature in southwestern Greenland, possibly dating back 3.7 billion years.
  - Aducanumab, a new antibody, is shown to significantly reduce harmful beta-amyloid plaques in patients with early-stage Alzheimer's disease.

=== September ===
- 1 September – An annular solar eclipse occurs.
- 2 September – Carbon nanotube transistors are shown to outperform silicon for the first time.
- 4 September – The International Union for Conservation of Nature and Natural Resources (IUCN) changes the status of the giant panda from "endangered" to "vulnerable" after decades of conservation work. However, the Eastern Gorilla – the largest living primate – is listed as Critically Endangered.
- 5 September
  - Philae, the lander of ESA's Rosetta spacecraft, is located on the comet 67P/Churyumov–Gerasimenko; the exact position of the probe was not known earlier since its landing on the comet in November 2014.
  - Typhoons in East Asia have grown 50% stronger in the past 40 years due to warming seas, according to a new study.

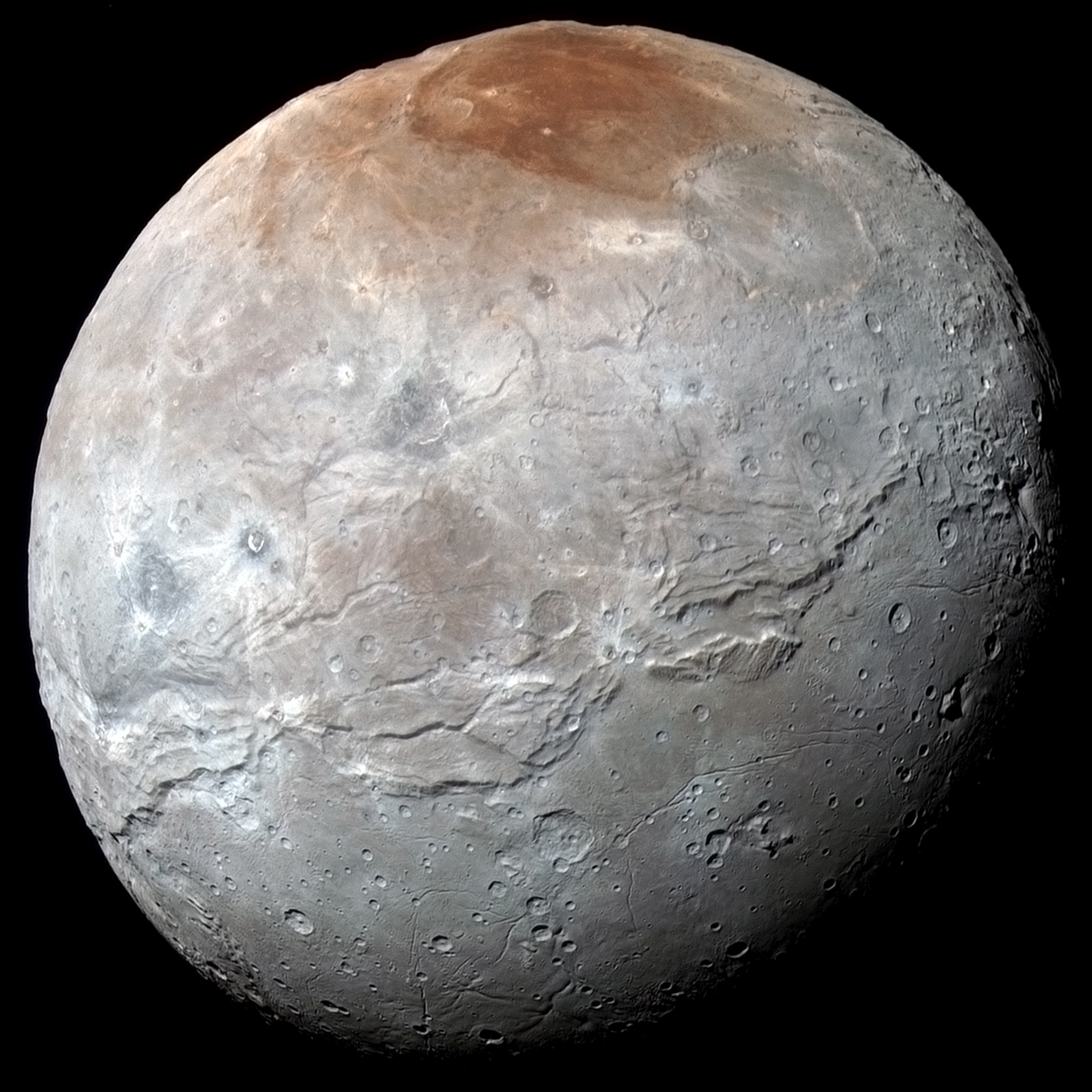
14 September: Reddish north pole of Charon, moon of Pluto, made of tholins formed from atmospheric gases released from Pluto.

- 7 September – One-tenth of the world's wilderness is reported to have disappeared in the last 20 years – an area twice the size of Alaska – with the Amazon and Central Africa being the hardest hit regions.
- 8 September
  - DNA testing of skeletal remains in London confirms that Yersinia pestis was the bacteria responsible for the Great Plague of 1665.
  - NASA launches the seven-year OSIRIS-REx mission, which aims to reach the 500m-wide asteroid Bennu and bring a sample back to Earth.
  - A genetic analysis shows that the genus giraffe, previously thought to contain one extant species, actually consists of four.
- 10 September – The second largest meteorite ever found is exhumed near Gancedo, Argentina. It weighs 30 tonnes and fell to Earth around 2000 BC.
- 13 September – The European Space Agency releases the first batch of data from the Gaia space telescope, which has recorded the position and brightness of a billion stars in the Milky Way galaxy.
- 14 September – Astronomers announce that the reddish-brown cap of the north pole of Charon, the largest of five moons that orbit the dwarf planet Pluto, is composed of tholins, organic macromolecules produced from methane, nitrogen and related gases released from the atmosphere of Pluto and transferred over about 19,000 km (12,000 mi) distance to the orbiting moon.
- 16 September – The development of 1 terabit-per-second transmission rates over optical fiber is announced by Nokia Bell Labs, Deutsche Telekom T-Labs and the Technical University of Munich.
- 20 September
  - Sandisk announces the first 1 terabyte SD card at photokina 2016.
  - A Japanese team accurately sequences a tardigrade genome, finds minimal foreign DNA, and discovers a protein that confers resistance to radiation when transferred into human cells.

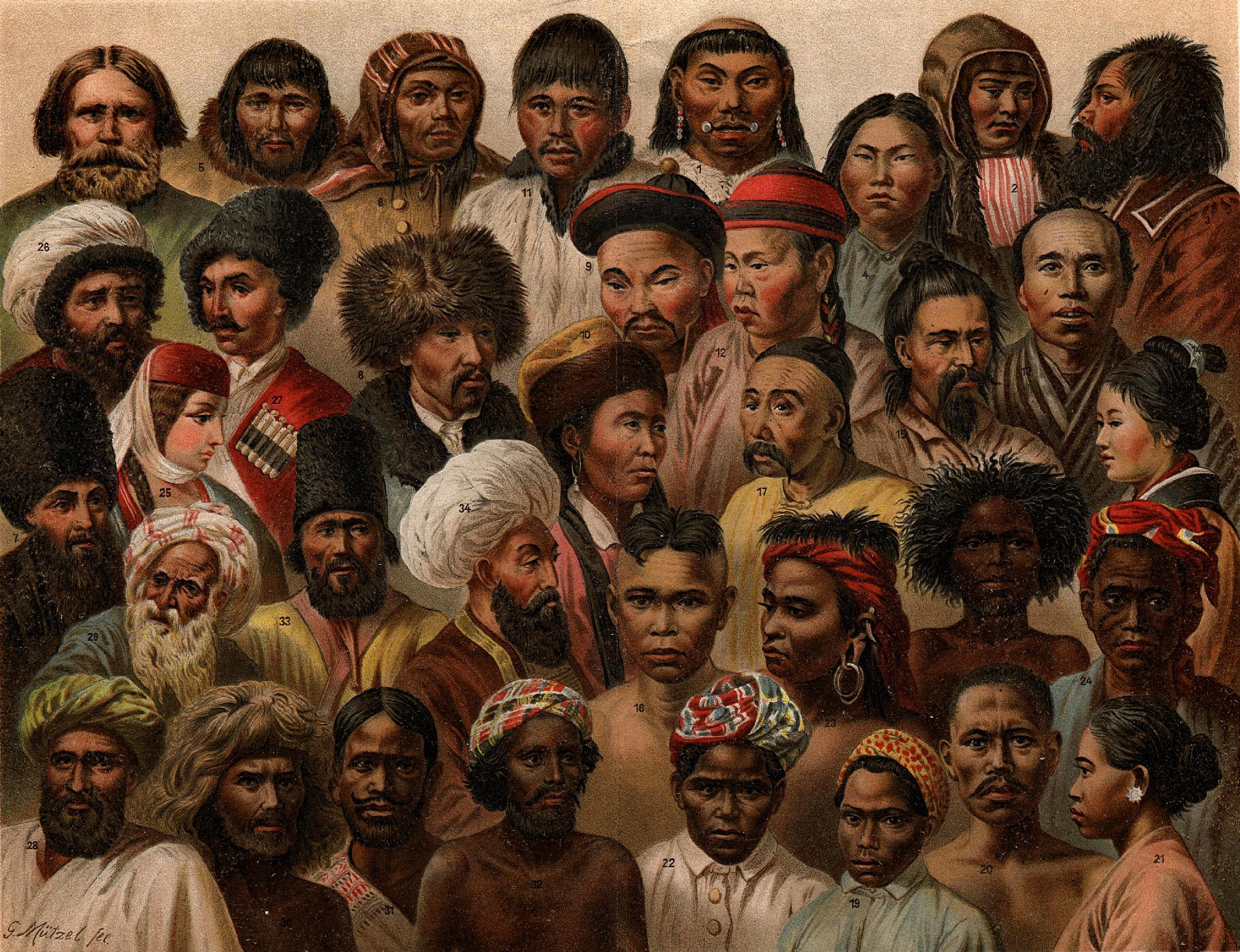
21 September: All non-African humans currently on Earth can be traced to a single group that exited Africa about 50,000 years ago.

- 21 September – Scientists report that, based on human DNA genetic studies, all non-African humans in the world today can be traced to a single population that exited Africa between 50,000 and 80,000 years ago.
- 22 September
  - Meltwater ponds are reported in East Antarctica for the first time, after temperatures rose above 0 °C.
  - Researchers at the University of Toronto create the first map that shows the global genetic interaction network of a cell. It begins to explain how thousands of genes coordinate with one another to orchestrate cellular life.
- 25 September – The Five-hundred-meter Aperture Spherical Telescope (FAST) becomes operational in Guizhou Province, southwest China.
- 26 September – Mercury is found to be tectonically active.
- 27 September
  - The world's first baby born through a controversial new "three parent" technique is reported.
  - SpaceX founder and entrepreneur Elon Musk reveals his plan to send humans to Mars on a new spacecraft, with uncrewed flights beginning as early as 2022.
- 29 September – A study led by the University of Cambridge finds that body-worn cameras led to a 93% drop in complaints made against police by the UK and US public.
- 30 September – The Rosetta spacecraft ends its mission by attempting a soft-landing inside a 130 m (425 ft) wide pit, called Deir el-Medina, on comet 67P. The walls of the pit contain 0.91 m (3 ft) wide so-called "goose bumps", considered to be building blocks of the comet.

=== October ===
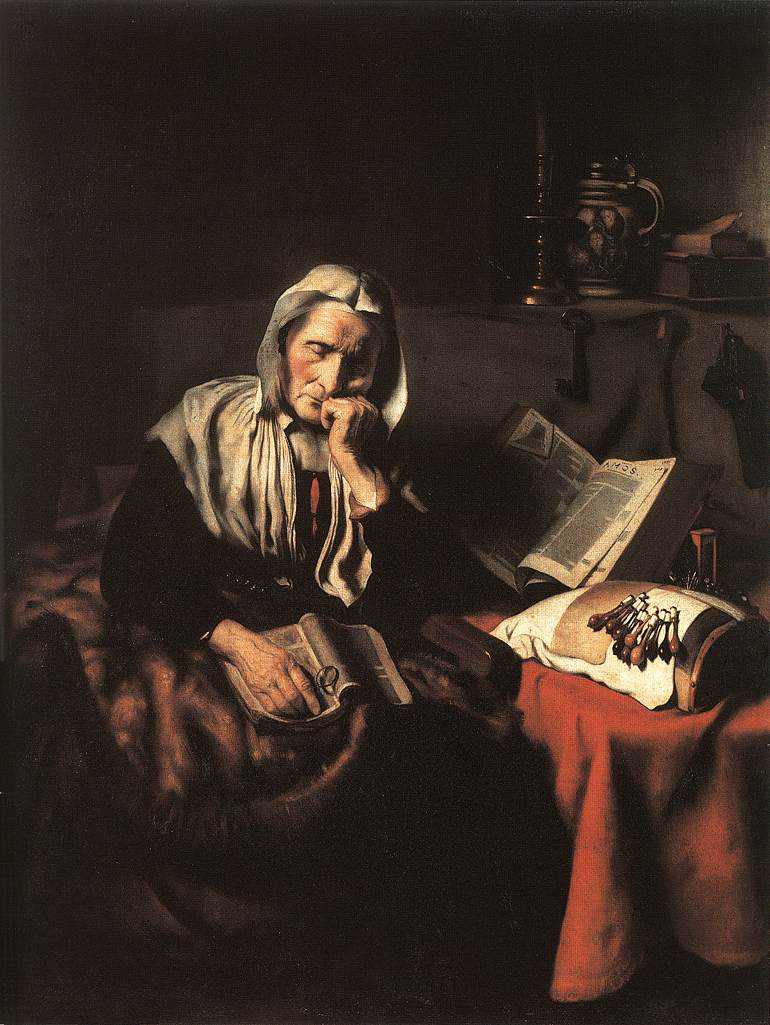
5 October: Upper age limit of human longevity is reported as 125 years old.

- 3 October
  - A study published by the University of Wisconsin-Milwaukee shows that caffeine consumption may reduce the risk of dementia in women by 36 percent.
  - The 2016 Nobel Prize in Physiology or Medicine is awarded to Yoshinori Ohsumi of Japan for discoveries about autophagy.
  - The British Journal of Sports Medicine reports that playing golf can increase life expectancy by five years.
- 4 October – The 2016 Nobel Prize in Physics is awarded to David J. Thouless, F. Duncan M. Haldane and John M. Kosterlitz for discoveries relating to exotic quantum states of matter and topological order.
- 5 October
  - The 2016 Nobel Prize in Chemistry is awarded to Jean-Pierre Sauvage, Sir J. Fraser Stoddart and Bernard L. Feringa for the design and synthesis of molecular machines.
  - Scientists identify the maximum human lifespan at an average age of 115, with an absolute upper limit of 125 years old.
  - NASA's Cassini mission reveals evidence of a subsurface ocean within Saturn's moon Dione.
- 6 October
  - Researchers at France's CNRS research institute announce that Proxima b may have oceans.
  - Researchers at the Department of Energy's Lawrence Berkeley National Laboratory demonstrate a working 1 nanometre (nm) transistor.
- 9 October – Nivolumab is shown to more than double the one-year survival rate of patients with head and neck cancer compared with chemotherapy. It also shrinks tumours in advanced kidney cancer patients.

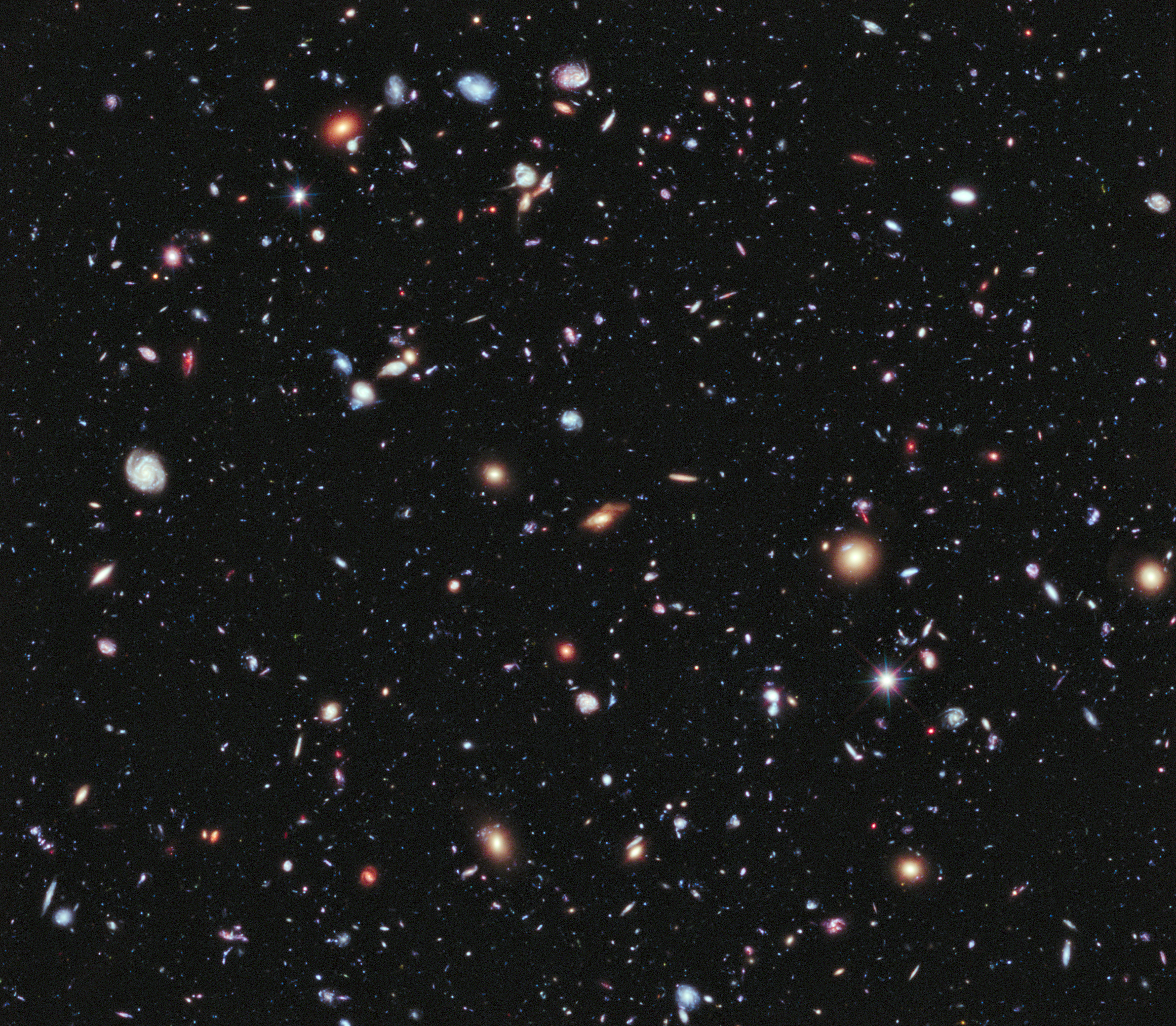
13 October: The observable universe is found to contain at least 2 trillion galaxies, about 10 times more than previously thought.

- 10 October – A study by the Earth Institute at Columbia University finds that wildfires have doubled in area over the last 30 years due to climate change.
- 11 October
  - President Obama renews a vision for US government involvement in a human mission to the planet Mars by the mid-2030s.
  - Astronomers announce the discovery of 2014 UZ224, a new dwarf planet 13.6 billion km (8.5 billion miles) from the Sun.
- 12 October
  - Astronomers report that the very basic chemical ingredients of life—the carbon-hydrogen molecule (CH, or methylidyne radical), the carbon-hydrogen positive ion (CH+) and the carbon ion (C+)—are the result, in large part, of ultraviolet light from stars, rather than in other ways, such as the result of turbulent events related to supernovae and young stars, as thought earlier.
  - Plans are announced for 'Asgardia' – the first nation state in outer space.
- 13 October – Using 3D imaging techniques on 20 years of photographs by the Hubble Space Telescope, astronomers estimate there are 2 trillion galaxies in the observable universe, about 10 times more than previously thought.
- 17 October
  - A team at Australia's University of New South Wales create a new quantum bit that remains in a stable superposition for 10 times longer than previously achieved.
  - NASA's Goddard Institute for Space Studies (GISS) reports that September 2016 was the hottest September on record globally.
- 18 October
  - A new automated system that can achieve parity with humans in conversational speech recognition is announced by researchers at Microsoft.
  - Researchers at the University of Warwick discover the physical location of depression in the human brain, which is found to affect the lateral orbitofrontal cortex, implicated in non-reward.

24 October: Carbon CO_{2} levels expected to be above 400 ppm for the full 2016 year, just one year after this concentration was first reached.

- 19 October – ExoMars Trace Gas Orbiter arrives at Mars; the accompanying Schiaparelli crashes on the surface after its parachute was jettisoned too early and its rockets fired for too short a time. On 21 October 2016, NASA released a Mars Reconnaissance Orbiter image showing what appears to be the Schiaparelli EDM lander crash site.
- 20 October – Researchers at James Cook University in Australia report that adding a type of dried seaweed (Asparagopsis taxiformis) to the diet of cattle could reduce their emissions of methane by 50-70%.
- 21 October – MIT announces a new record for plasma pressure in an Alcator C-Mod tokamak nuclear fusion reactor, achieving over 2 atmospheres of pressure for the first time.
- 24 October – The World Meteorological Organisation reports that 2016 will likely be the first full year when atmospheric CO_{2} stayed above 400ppm.
- 25 October – Receiving the last bit of data (of a total of 50 billion bits of data; or 6.25 gigabytes) from the New Horizons spacecraft, from its close encounter with the dwarf planet Pluto on 14 July 2015, ends at 05:48 pm, ET on 25 October 2016. New Horizons is currently on a journey to 486958 Arrokoth, a classical Kuiper belt object (KBO), and is expected to swing closely past the object on 1 January 2019.
- 27 October
  - The Living Planet assessment, by the Zoological Society of London (ZSL) and WWF, reports that vertebrate wildlife populations have fallen by 58% globally since 1970, and suggests this figure may reach two-thirds among vertebrates by 2020.
  - Researchers use "neighbour maps" to reveal the shape of a genome in 3-D.
  - Researchers at UC Santa Barbara design a functional nanoscale computing element that could, in theory, be packed into a space no bigger than 50 nanometers on any side.
  - Researchers in England identify the first known example of fossilised brain tissue in a dinosaur.
- 31 October
  - A study by the Nature Conservancy claims an estimated 6.2 million lives will be lost to particulate matter each year by 2050, but this pollution can be reduced by 7 to 24 percent near trees, while the cooling effect is up to 2 °C (3.6 °F).
  - Researchers at Penn State report a 1,000-fold increase in the scanning speed for 3-D printing, using a space-charge-controlled KTN beam deflector with a large electro-optic effect.

=== November ===
- 1 November – Scientists at Rockefeller University use a technique called "light sculpting" to view the neurons of a mouse brain firing in real-time in 3-D.
- 2 November – Construction of the James Webb Space Telescope primary mirror is completed, launched in late 2021.

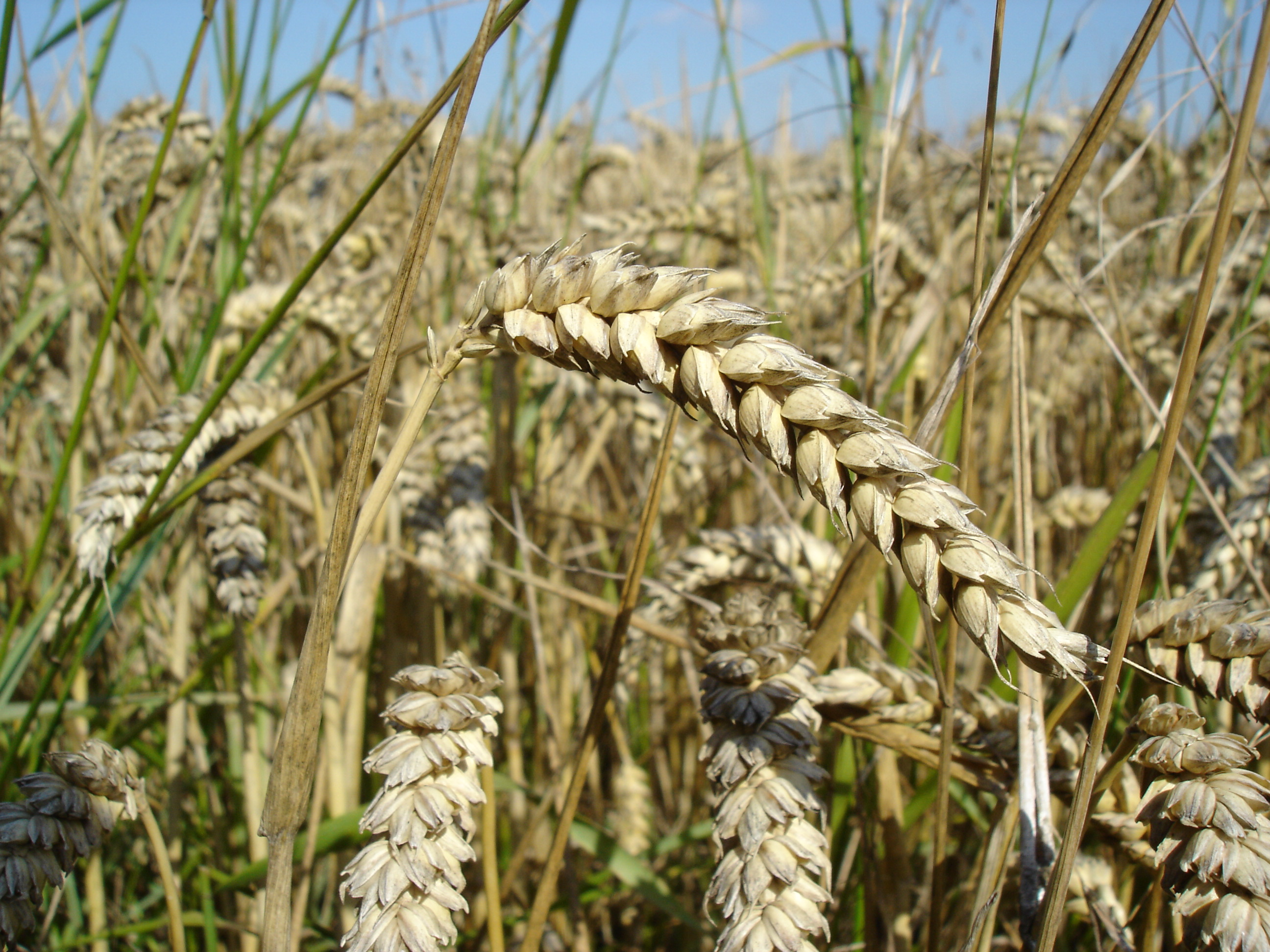
4 November: Superwheat, a genetically modified grain, is reported to boost yields by 20 to 40 percent.

- 3 November
  - Scanning people's brains with functional magnetic resonance imaging (fMRI) is found to be significantly more effective at spotting lies than a traditional polygraph test.
  - Scientists publish early human results of a potent BACE1 inhibitor for the treatment and prevention of Alzheimer's disease.
  - A study published in the journal Tobacco Control finds that graphic warnings on cigarette packs could prevent 652,000 deaths in the U.S. over the next 50 years.
  - At a conference in San Diego, Adobe demonstrates audio software that accurately replicates any person's voice, thus potentially rewriting what an original speaker has actually said.
- 4 November – Researchers in the UK announce a genetically modified "superwheat" that increases the efficiency of photosynthesis to boost yields by 20 to 40 percent. Field trials are expected in 2017.
- 5 November – The University of Oxford AI Lab presents "LipNet", a new AI algorithm capable of lip-reading up to 40% more accurately than a real person.
- 6 November – The International Astronomical Union approves the name Rigil Kentaurus for Alpha Centauri A. This follows the naming of Proxima Centauri for Alpha Centauri C on 21 August 2016.
- 8 November
  - New data released by the World Meteorological Organisation (WMO) shows that the five years from 2011 to 2015 were the warmest on record, largely due to human activities, with 2016 likely to be even hotter.
  - Lab-grown mini lungs, developed from stem cells, are successfully transplanted into mice by researchers at the University of Michigan Health System.
- 9 November
  - The previous upper estimate of global warming by 2100 is raised from 4.8 °C to 7.36 °C, in a study published by the University of Hawaii.
- 11 November – Researchers at the University of Central Florida present research into solar nanotech-powered clothing.
- 13 November – The University of East Anglia reports that global emissions of CO_{2} did not grow in 2015 and are projected to rise only slightly in 2016, marking three years of almost no growth.
- 14 November – A supermoon occurs, as the full Moon comes closer to the Earth than at any time since 1948.
- 15 November – Scientists at Rockefeller University identify which genes in a microbe's genome ought to produce antibiotic compounds and then synthesize those compounds to discover two promising new antibiotics.

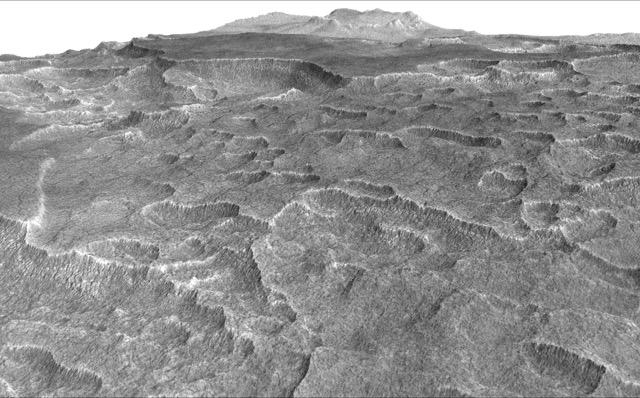
22 November: Mars - Utopia Planitia - Scalloped terrain led to the discovery of a large amount of underground ice, equivalent to the amount of water in Lake Superior. (map)

- 16 November
  - The United States Geological Survey estimates there are 20 billion barrels of oil in Texas' Wolfcamp Shale Formation, the largest estimate of continuous oil that USGS has ever assessed in the United States.
  - Researchers at the Salk Institute use a new gene-editing technology known as HITI, which is based on CRISPR, to partially restore vision in blind animals. Their technique is the first time a new gene has been inserted into a precise DNA location in adult cells that no longer divide, such as those of the eye, brain, pancreas or heart.
- 18 November – Researchers from Caltech and UCLA develop a technique to remove mutated DNA from mitochondria, which could help slow or reverse an important cause of aging.
- 21 November – Researchers use human pluripotent stem cells to grow human intestinal tissues with functioning nerves, then use these to recreate and study a severe intestinal nerve disorder called Hirschsprung's disease.
- 22 November – NASA reports that its Mars Reconnaissance Orbiter has found a huge deposit of water ice just under the surface of the planet Mars, in the region known as Utopia Planitia. The volume of water detected is equivalent to the volume of water in Lake Superior. (image) (map)
- 25 November
  - Researchers create the first living cells that form silicon-carbon bonds. The responsible protein does it more efficiently than any synthetic catalyst.
  - Scientists behind a theory that the speed of light is variable – and not constant as Einstein suggested – produce a model with an exact figure on the spectral index that they say is testable.
- 28 November
  - Scientists at the International Union of Pure and Applied Chemistry(IUPAC) officially recognizes names for four new chemical elements: Nihonium, Nh, 113; Moscovium, Mc, 115; Tennessine, Ts, 117 and Oganesson, Og, 118.
  - Researchers trace the origin of a 2015 iceberg to a deep subsurface rift opening within the West Antarctic ice shelf, the first time this has been observed.
  - Large-scale testing of a potential HIV vaccine known as HVTN 702 begins in South Africa.
- 29 November – A study finds that higher water temperatures during 2016 caused the worst destruction of corals ever recorded on Australia's Great Barrier Reef, with 67% dying in the worst-hit northern section.
- 30 November
  - Thomas Crowther et al. report that increasing soil respiration alone will add between 0.45 and 0.71 parts per million of CO_{2} to the atmosphere every year until 2050. This will cause at least 55 gigatons of carbon to be lost from the soil by mid-century, equivalent to another industrialised country the size of the United States.
  - Researchers calculate the weight of Earth's technosphere as 30 trillion tons, a mass greater than 50 kilos for every square metre of the planet's surface.

=== December ===
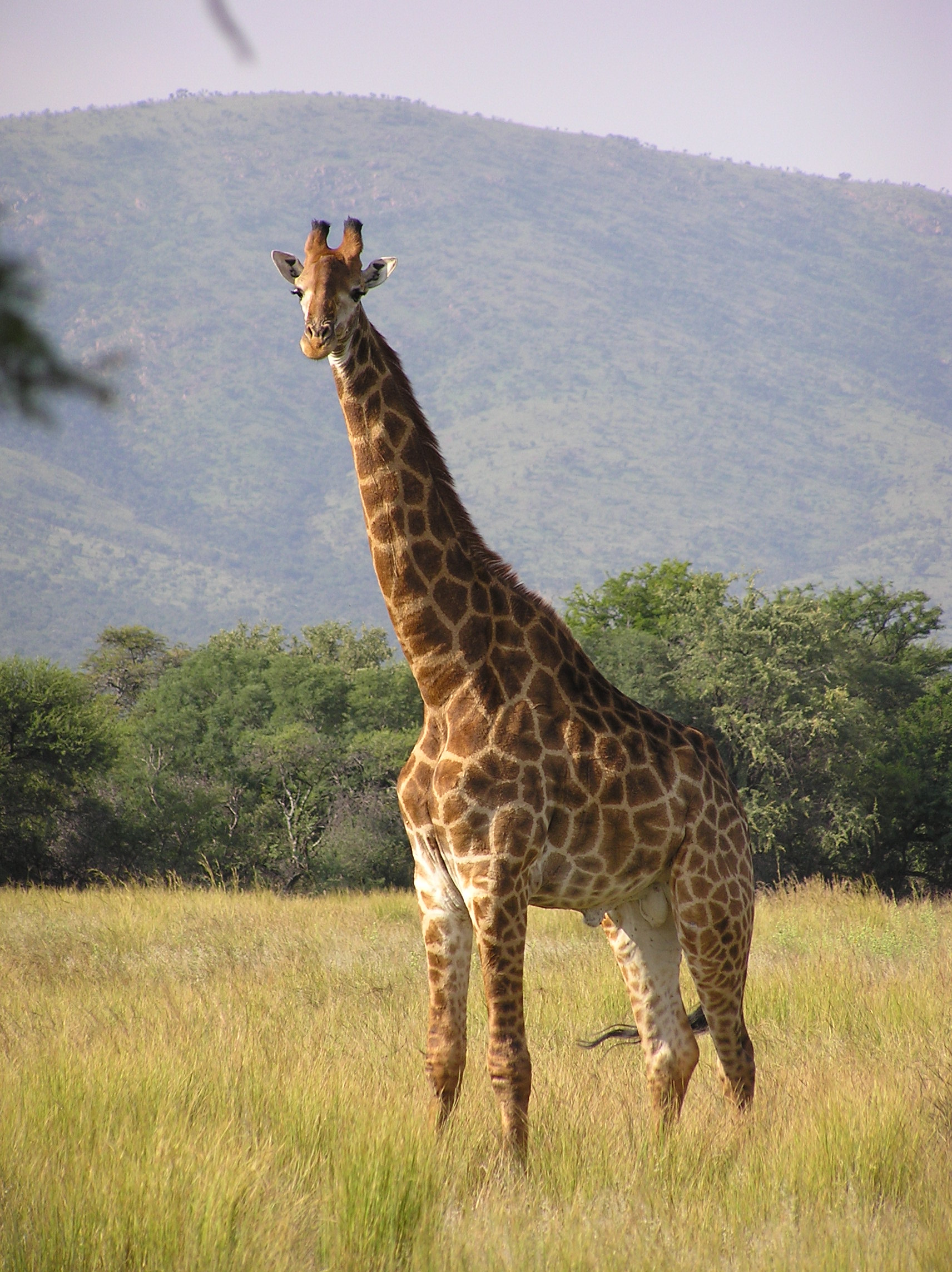
8 December: Giraffes are listed as "vulnerable" after a huge population decline.

- 5 December – Researchers at Harvard discover a causal link between RNA splicing and aging.
- 6 December
  - Researchers at UC Berkeley design a wall-jumping robot known as Salto, which is described as the most vertically agile robot ever built.
  - The National Snow and Ice Data Center announces record low sea ice extents for both the Arctic and Antarctic, with "exceptionally low" sea ice cover for the globe as a whole.
- 8 December
  - The International Union for Conservation of Nature (IUCN) announces that giraffe populations declined from 155,000 in 1985 to 97,000 in 2015. Their conservation status is moved from "least concern" to "vulnerable".
  - The tail of a tiny, feathered, sparrow-sized dinosaur, found perfectly preserved in amber and believed to be 99 million years old, is described in the journal Current Biology.
- 9 December – Researchers at Tohoku University in Japan demonstrate a super flexible liquid crystal (LC) device, which could make electronic displays and devices more flexible, increasing their portability and versatility.
- 12 December
  - Harvard researchers identify an aerosol that could, in theory, be injected into the stratosphere to cool the planet from greenhouse gases, while also repairing ozone damage.
  - A study of 37 mountain glaciers around the world is published, concluding with 99% certainty that climate change is driving their retreat.
- 13 December – The world's largest wild reindeer herd is reported to have fallen in population by 40% since 2000, due to rising temperatures and human activity, causing the animals to change their annual migration patterns. A separate study reveals that reindeer on Svalbard have got smaller and lighter, by around 12%, due to diminishing food supplies.
- 14 December – A study published in Nature finds the seahorse genome to be the most rapidly evolving fish genome studied so far.

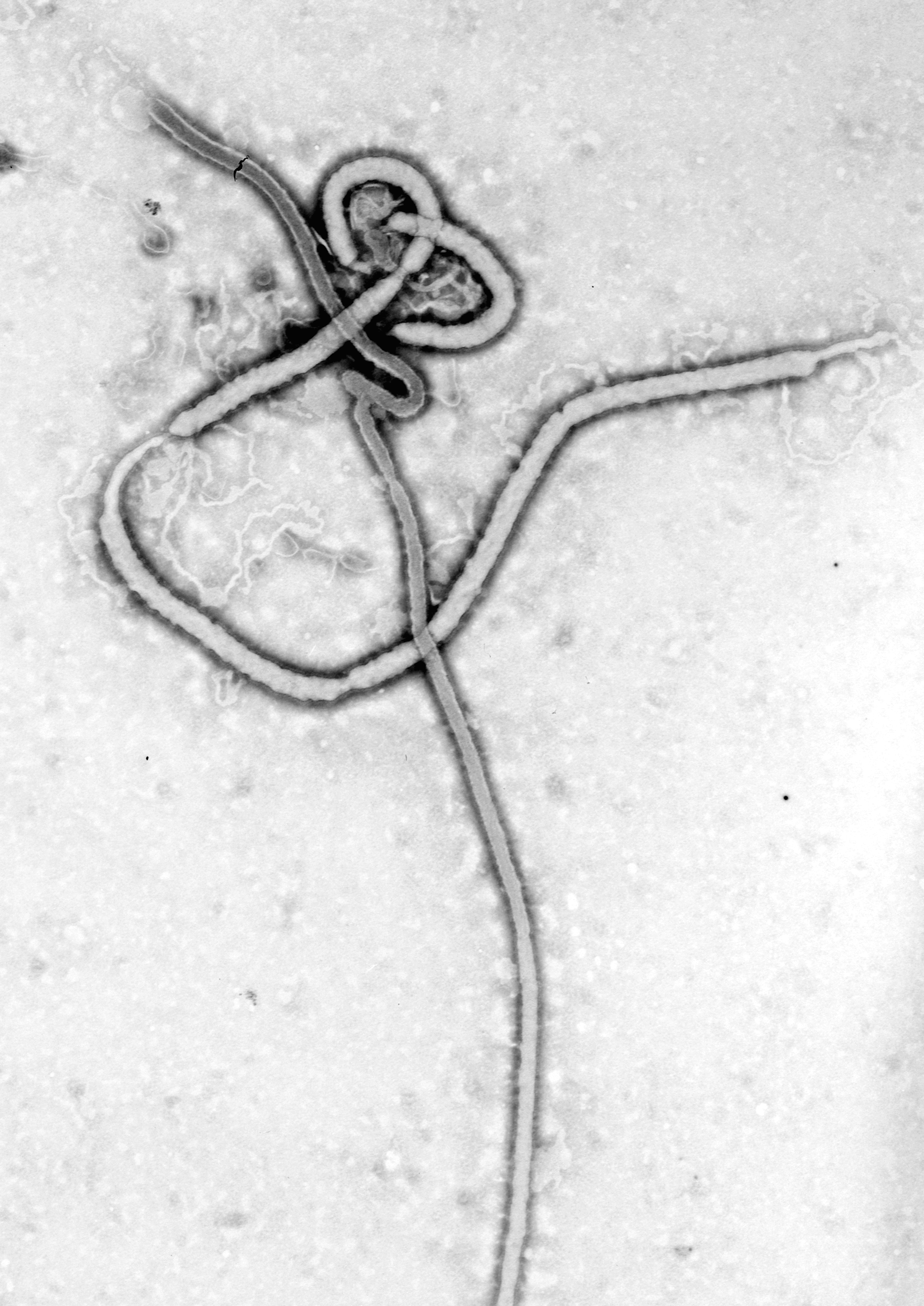
22 December: Ebola virus disease found to be 70–100% prevented by rVSV-ZEBOV vaccine, making it the first proven vaccine against the disease.

- 15 December – Scientists use a new form of gene therapy to partially reverse aging in mice. After six weeks of treatment, the animals looked younger, had straighter spines and better cardiovascular health, healed quicker when injured, and lived 30% longer.
- 19 December
  - An iron 'jet stream' is detected in Earth's outer core, moving westwards under Alaska and Siberia, inferred from measurements made by Europe's Swarm satellites.
  - Scientists warn that deep sea mining threatens a newly discovered species of octopod, nicknamed 'Casper'.
  - The ALPHA experiment at CERN observes the light spectrum of antimatter for the first time.
- 22 December
  - Ebola virus disease found to be 70–100% prevented by rVSV-ZEBOV vaccine, making it the first proven vaccine against the disease.
  - The UK's National Health Service (NHS) announces that 10 blind patients will receive "bionic eyes" to help treat an inherited form of blindness.
- 26 December
  - The genome of the common ash (Fraxinus excelsior) is sequenced for the first time.
  - Cheetah populations are reported to be crashing, with just 7,100 left in the wild. The study authors warn that the animals are "much more vulnerable to extinction than was previously thought" and recommend a "paradigm shift in conservation".
  - Researchers at Tufts University create programmable silk-based materials with embedded, pre-designed functions.
- 29 December
  - NASA astronomers report the detection of two new objects which are both expected to pass safely by the Earth in January and February 2017: a "relatively large" asteroid named 2016 WF9 and a comet named C/2016 U1 (NEOWISE).
  - NASA reveals a potential habitat design for colonists on Mars, which offers shielding from extreme temperatures and radiation by using inflatable domes covered in ice.

== Deaths ==
=== January ===
- 24 January: Marvin Minsky, American cognitive scientist (b. 1927).

=== March ===
- 17 March: Solomon Marcus, Romanian mathematician (b. 1925).

=== April ===
- 3 April: Stephen Jacobsen, American bioengineer and roboticist (b. 1940).
- 19 April: Walter Kohn, American theoretical physicist, theoretical chemist and Nobel Prize winner (b. 1923).
- 30 April: Harry Kroto, British chemist and Nobel Prize winner (b. 1939)

=== May ===
- 15 May: André Brahic, French astrophysicist (discovered the rings of Neptune) (b. 1942)

=== July ===
- 2 July: Rudolf E. Kálmán, Hungarian-born American electrical engineer (b. 1930).

=== August ===
- 1 August: Jennifer Moyle, English research biochemist (b. 1921)
- 2 August: Ahmed Zewail, Egyptian chemist and Nobel Prize winner (b. 1946)
- 19 August: Donald Henderson, American epidemiologist (led effort that eradicated smallpox worldwide) (b. 1928)
- 24 August: Roger Tsien, American biochemist and Nobel Prize winner (b. 1952)
- 25 August: James Cronin, American particle physicist and Nobel Prize winner (b. 1931)

=== December ===
- 12 December: Esther Wilkins, American pioneer of dental hygiene (b. 1916).
- 25 December: Vera Rubin, American astronomer (b. 1928).

== See also ==
- 2016 in spaceflight
- List of emerging technologies
- List of years in science
- 2016 in science fiction
