= C/2016 U1 (NEOWISE) =

Parabolic comet

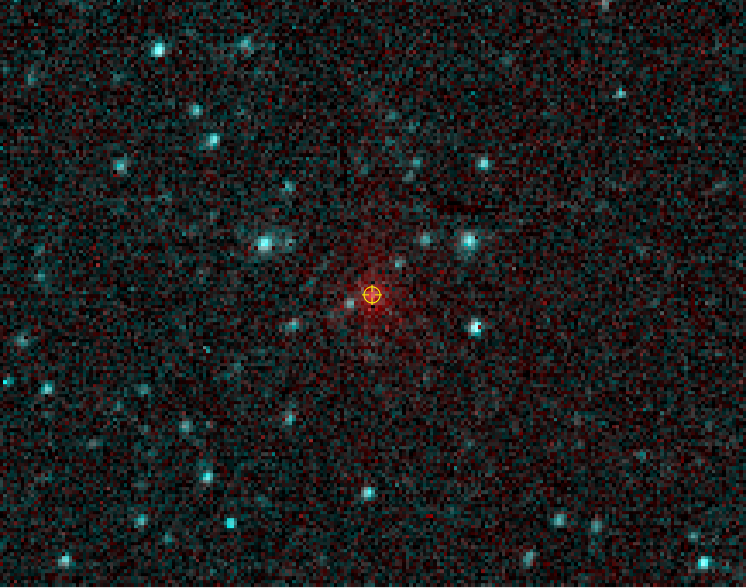
- Infrared image of C/2016 U1 (NEOWISE) taken on 21 November 2016

Discovery
- Discovered by: NEOWISE
- Discovery date: 21 October 2016

Orbital characteristics
- Epoch: 12 December 2016 (JD 2457734.5)
- Observation arc: 83 days
- Number of observations: 366
- Perihelion: 0.319 AU
- Eccentricity: 1.00025
- Inclination: 46.435°
- Longitude of ascending node: 61.429°
- Argument of periapsis: 162.75°
- Mean anomaly: –0.001°
- Last perihelion: 14 January 2017
- T_{Jupiter}: 0.489
- Earth MOID: 0.589 AU
- Jupiter MOID: 0.811 AU

Physical characteristics
- Mean radius: 1.025 km (0.637 mi)
- Comet total magnitude (M1): 13.1
- Comet nuclear magnitude (M2): 19.5
- Apparent magnitude: 6.8 (2017 apparition)

C/2016 U1 (NEOWISE) is a non-periodic comet discovered on 21 October 2016 by NEOWISE, the asteroid-and-comet-hunting portion of the Wide-field Infrared Survey Explorer (WISE) mission. The comet brightened to magnitude +6.8 and could be observed with binoculars, during the first week of 2017 and it was closest to the Sun on 14 January 2017.

== Orbit ==
It was closest to the Earth on 13 December 2016 at a distance of 0.709 AU (106.1 million km) away, and it is not considered a threat to Earth. The aphelion of the comet lies at the inner edge of the Oort cloud and it is possible that the 2017 perihelion was not the first and that during a previous perihelion planetary perturbations pushed the comet towards the Oort cloud. Despite its small size, the comet survived perihelion and was observed for days from the SWAN instrument on board SOHO.

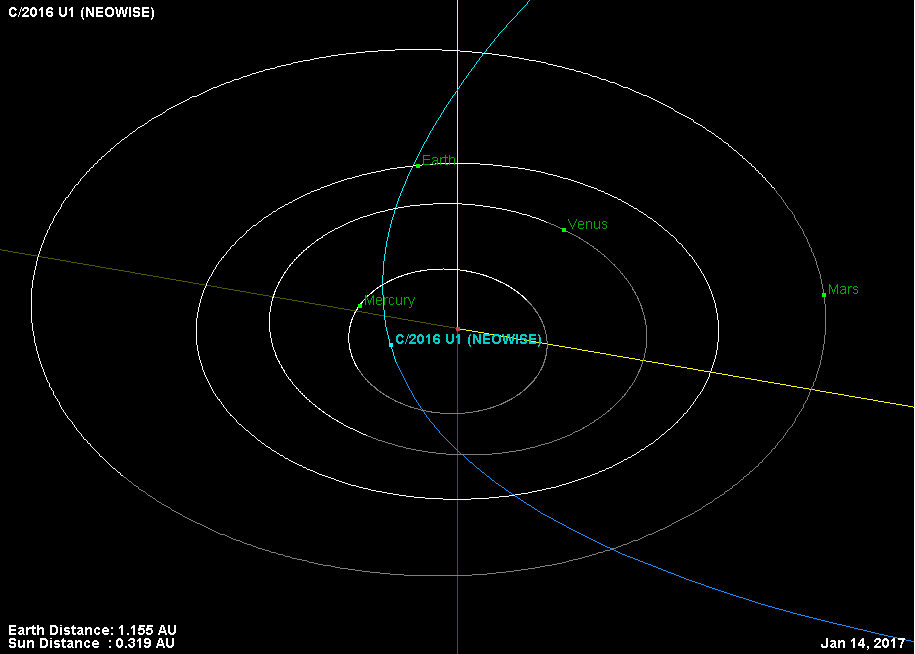
Orbit of C/2016 U_{1} (NEOWISE) on 14 January 2017, closest approach to the Sun.
