= Quantum tunneling of water =

Physical phenomenon

The quantum tunneling of water occurs when water molecules in nanochannels exhibit quantum tunneling behavior that smears out the positions of the hydrogen atoms into a pair of correlated rings. In that state, the water molecules become delocalized around a ring and assume an unusual double top-like shape. At low temperatures, the phenomenon showcases the quantum motion of water through the separating potential walls, which is forbidden in classical mechanics, but allowed in quantum mechanics.

The quantum tunneling of water occurs under ultraconfinement in rocks, soil and cell walls. The phenomenon is predicted to help scientists better understand the thermodynamic properties and behavior of water in confined environments such as water diffusion, transport in the channels of cell membranes and in carbon nanotubes.

== History ==
Quantum tunneling in water was reported as early as 1992. At that time it was known that motions can destroy and regenerate the weak hydrogen bond by internal rotations of the substituent water monomers.

On 18 March 2016, it was reported that the hydrogen bond can be broken by quantum tunneling in the water hexamer. Unlike previously reported tunneling motions in water, this involved the concerted breaking of two hydrogen bonds.

On 22 April 2016, the journal Physical Review Letters reported the quantum tunneling of water molecules as demonstrated at the Spallation Neutron Source and Rutherford Appleton Laboratory. First indications of this phenomenon were seen by scientists from Russia and Germany in 2013 based on the splitting of terahertz absorption lines of a water molecule captured in five-ångström channels in beryl. Subsequently, it was directly observed using neutron scattering and analyzed by ab initio simulations. In a beryl channel, the water molecule can occupy six symmetrical orientations, in agreement with the known crystal structure. A single orientation has the oxygen atom approximately in the center of the channel, with the two hydrogens pointing to the same side toward one of the channel's six hexagonal faces. Other orientations point to other faces, but are separated from each other by energy barriers of around 50 meV. These barriers, however, do not stop the hydrogens from tunneling among the six orientations and thus split the ground state energy into multiple levels.
