= Smith's Cloud =

High velocity cloud in the constellation Aquila

Interstellar cloud
- High-velocity cloud
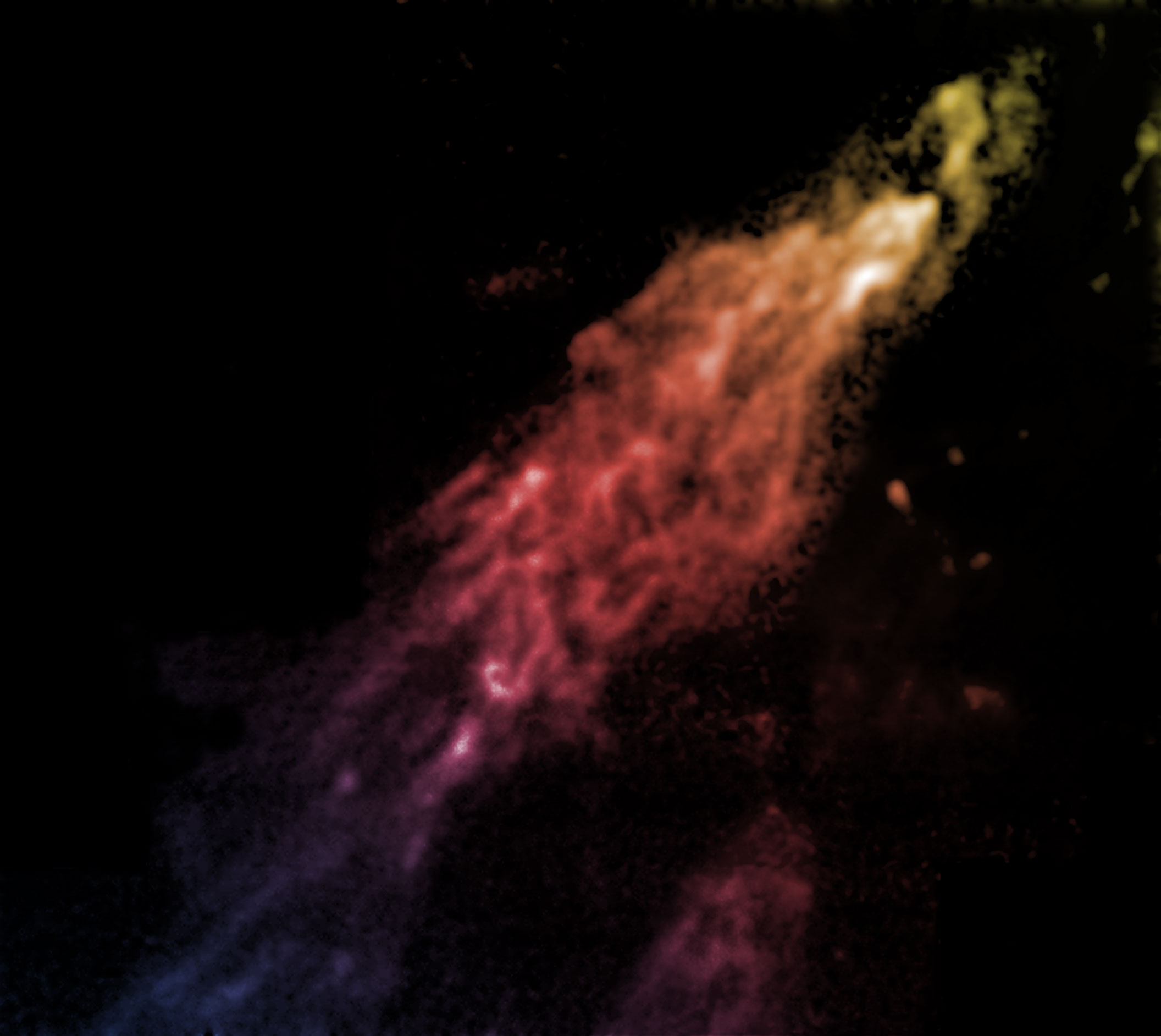
- An image of Smith's Cloud, taken in 2008 by the Green Bank Telescope

Observation data: J2000.0 epoch
- Right ascension: 19^{h} 59^{m}
- Declination: −00.3°
- Apparent diameter: 11°

Physical characteristics
- Dimensions: 9.8×10^{3} ly (3 kpc) × 3.3×10^{3} ly (1 kpc)
- Designations: Smith Cloud, WV 360, HVC 040-15

Smith's Cloud is a high-velocity cloud of hydrogen gas located in the constellation Aquila at Galactic coordinates l = 39°, b = −13°. The cloud was discovered in 1963 by Gail Bieger, née Smith, who was an astronomy student at Leiden University in the Netherlands.

== Properties ==
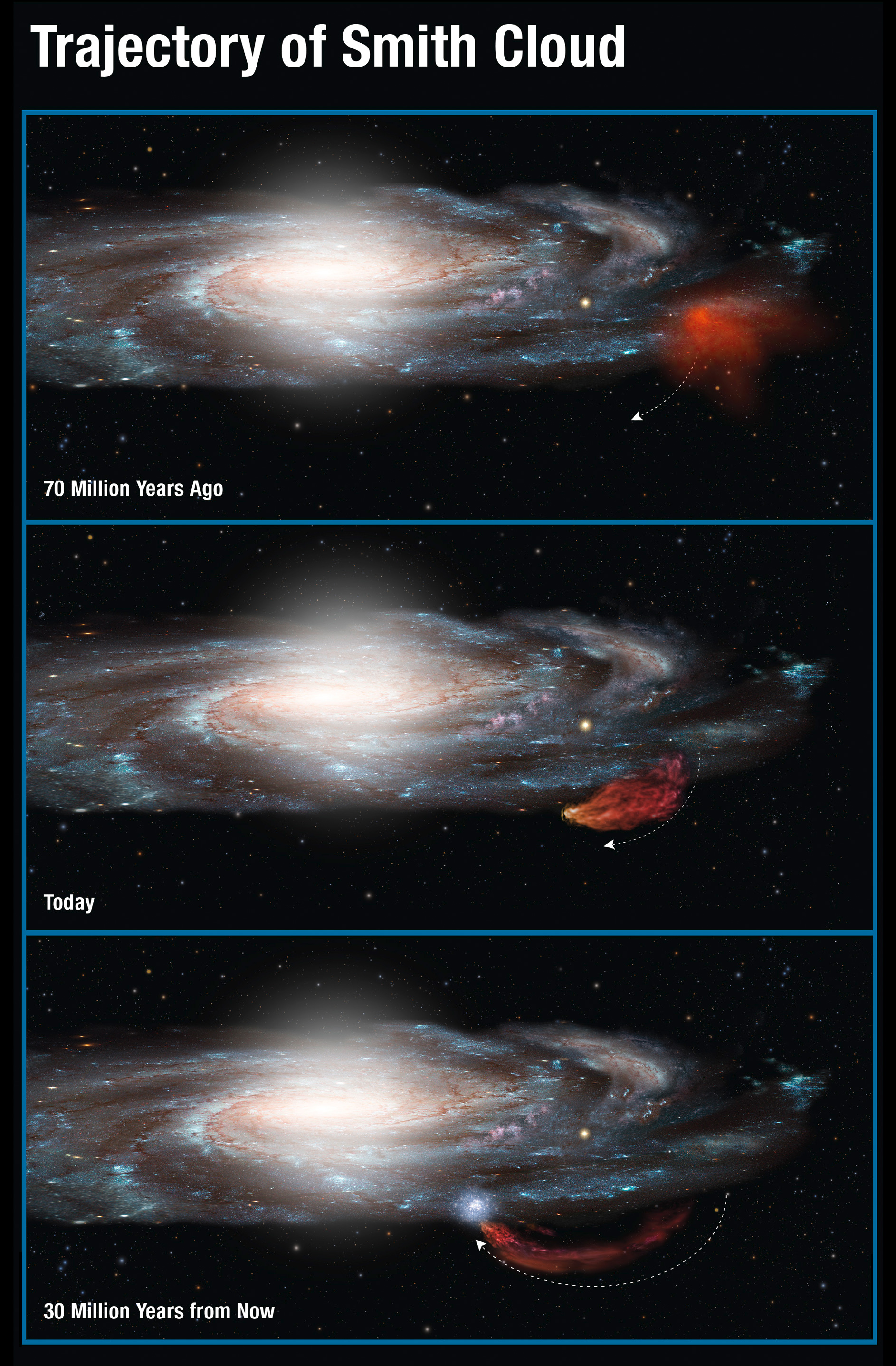
Trajectory of Smith Cloud.

Using the National Science Foundation's Robert C. Byrd Green Bank Telescope, radio astronomers have found that Smith's cloud has a mass of at least one million solar masses and measures 3,000 parsecs (9,800 ly) long by 1,000 pc (3,300 ly) wide in projection. The cloud is between 11,100 pc (36,000 ly) and 13,700 pc (45,000 ly) from Earth and has an angular diameter of 10 to 12 degrees, approximately as wide as the constellation Orion, or about 20 times the diameter of the full moon, although the cloud is not visible to the naked eye.

The cloud is apparently moving towards the disk of the Milky Way at 73 ± 26 kilometers per second. Smith's Cloud is expected to merge with the Milky Way in 27 million years at a point in the Perseus Arm. Astronomers believe it will strike the Milky Way disk at a 45° angle, and its impact may produce a burst of star formation or a supershell of neutral hydrogen.

Projecting the cloud's trajectory backwards through time, it is estimated that it had passed through the disk of the Milky Way some 70 million years ago. To have survived this previous encounter, astronomers have suggested that it is embedded inside a massive dark matter halo. The fact that it survived this previous encounter means that it is likely to be much more massive than previously thought, and may be a candidate for being a dark galaxy. In this scenario it would be a failed dwarf galaxy, with the ingredients to form a stellar galaxy, but few if any detectable stars. However, chemical abundance measurements from the Hubble Space Telescope argue against this hypothesis; these measurements show that the Smith Cloud has an average metallicity of one half of the solar value, indicating that its gas originates in the Galaxy, not from an extragalactic source. The cloud's orbit and metallicity are both consistent with an origin in the outer disk of the Milky Way. The mechanism by which this gas was released is not known.
