= IDCS J1426.5+3508 =

Galaxy cluster

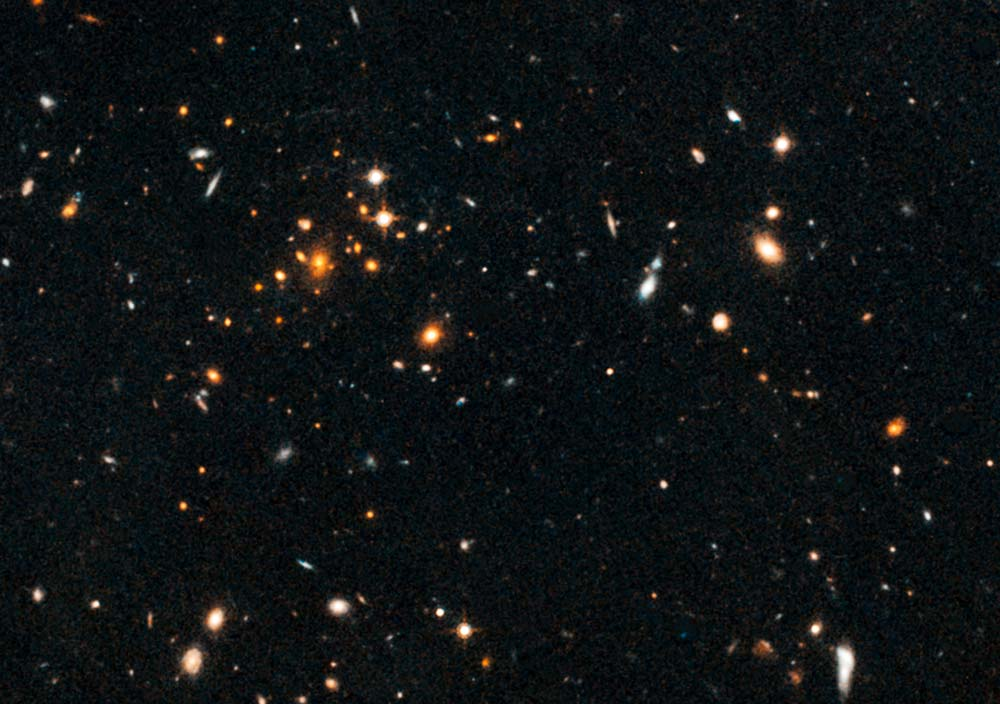
Galaxy Cluster IDCS J1426.5+3508 from the Hubble Space Telescope

IDCS J1426.5+3508 (IDCS 1426 for short) is an extremely massive young galaxy cluster. It is the most massive galaxy cluster detected at such an early age.

This rare galaxy cluster, which is located 10 billion light travel distance years from Earth, has a mass of almost 500 trillion Suns. This object has important implications for understanding how these mega-structures formed and evolved early in the Universe. Astronomers have observed IDCS 1426 when the universe was less than a third of its current age.

First discovered by the Spitzer Space Telescope in 2012, IDCS 1426 was then observed using the Hubble Space Telescope and the Keck Observatory to determine its distance. About 90% of the mass of the cluster is in the form of dark matter, the substance that has been detected only through its gravitational pull on normal matter composed of atoms.

There is a region of bright X-ray emission near the middle of the cluster, but not exactly at the center. The location of this “core” of gas suggests that the cluster had a collision or interaction with another massive system of galaxies, perhaps within about the last 500 million years. This would cause the core to become offset. IDCS 1426 is being observed from when the Universe was only 3.8 billion years old. For an enormous structure to form rapidly, mergers with smaller clusters would likely play a role in a large cluster’s growth.

This core, while still extremely hot, contains cooler gas than its surroundings. This is the most distant galaxy cluster where such a “cool core” of gas has been observed. These cool cores are important in understanding how quickly hot gas cools off in clusters, influencing the rate of stars at which stars are born. This cooling rate can be slowed by outbursts from a supermassive black hole in the center of the cluster. Apart from the cool core, the hot gas in the cluster is remarkably symmetrical and smooth. This is another piece of evidence that IDCS 1426 formed very rapidly and quickly in the early Universe. Despite the high mass and rapid evolution of this cluster, its existence does not pose a threat to the standard model of cosmology.
