= Cloud (disambiguation) =

A cloud is a visible mass of condensed droplets or frozen crystals suspended in the atmosphere.

Cloud(s, y) may also refer to:

== Arts, entertainment, and media ==
=== Fictional characters ===
- Cloud Strife, a character from Final Fantasy VII
- Bou Keng Wan or Cloud, a character in Fung Wan

=== Literature ===
- The Clouds, a comedy play by Aristophanes, originally produced at the City Dionysia in 423 BC
- Clouds, a 1977 philosophical comedic play by Michael Frayn
- The Clouds, a 1797 play by Richard Cumberland
- The Clouds (Las nubes), a 1997 novel by Juan José Saer

=== Music ===
- Cloud (music), a sound mass consisting of statistical clouds of microsounds
- Cloud Wan, a Hong Kong Cantopop singer from the 2020s
- Clouds (60s rock band), a Scottish music group
- The Clouds (Australian band), an indie rock group in the 1990s
- The Clouds (Scottish band), an indie pop band from the 1980s
- The Clouds (Manchester band), an indie pop band from the 1990s

==== Classical and jazz compositions ====
- Clouds, a composition by Berthold Goldschmidt
- Clouds, a composition by Charles Griffes
- Clouds, a composition by Ned Rorem
- "The Clouds" (composition)

==== Albums ====
- Clouds (Apollo Brown album) (2011)
- Clouds, an EP by Nosound
- Clouds (Gaussian Curve album) (2015)
- Clouds (Joni Mitchell album) (1969)
- Clouds (Lee Ranaldo album) (1997)
- Clouds (Tiamat album) (1992)
- Clouds (The Mixtape), a mixtape by NF (2021)
- The Clouds (album), an album by Stuart Hyatt

==== Songs ====
- "Cloudy" (song), a song by Simon & Garfunkel
- "Clouds" (Zach Sobiech song)
- "Both Sides, Now" or "Clouds", a song by Joni Mitchell
- "Clouds", a song by Chaka Khan from Naughty
- "Clouds", a song by Level 42 from Retroglide
- "Clouds", an interlude by Janet Jackson from All for You
- "Clouds", a song by Kasabian from 48:13
- "Clouds", a song by One Direction from Four
- "Clouds", a song by Redrama (feat. A. J. McLean) from Reflection
- "Clouds", a song by Spires That in the Sunset Rise from This Is Fire
- "Clouds", a track by Slayyyter from her album Troubled Paradise
- "Clouds", a 2013 song by Travis Garland from Travis Garland
- "Clouds" (NF song), 2021
- "Clouds", a 2020 song by Steps from the album What the Future Holds
- "Cloudy", a song by Average White Band from Cut the Cake
- "Clouds" (J. Cole song), 2025

=== Other uses in arts, entertainment, and media ===
- Cloud (film), a 2024 Japanese film by Kiyoshi Kurosawa
- Cloud (video game), a 2005 third-person computer puzzle game
- Clouds (2000 film), an American film by Don Thompson
- Clouds (2020 film), an American drama film by Justin Baldoni
- "Cloudy", a 2017 episode of "Elements" from Adventure Time
- Clouds (sculpture), a 2000 stainless steel abstract sculpture by Hans Van de Bovenkamp
- "The Cloud", an episode of The Flumps

== Information technology ==
- Cloud computing, Internet-based development and use of computer technology stored on servers rather than the client computers
- Cloud storage, a model of networked online storage
- Google Cloud, a name used by Google for several different offerings from time to time
- Cloud (operating system), an operating system by Good OS
- Cloud.com, software developer of Apache CloudStack

== People with the name ==
- Cloud (dancer) (born 1983), American dancer
- Cloud (surname)
- Clodoald or Cloud (522–560), son of King Chlodomer of Orleans

== Places ==
- Cloud County, Kansas
- Clouds, Tennessee, an unincorporated community
- Saint Cloud, Minnesota
- Saint-Cloud, a commune in the western suburbs of Paris, France
- Cloudy Peak, a mountain in New Zealand
- Temple Cloud, a village in Somerset, England
- Thorpe Cloud, a hill in Derbyshire, England

== Other uses ==
- Cloud in the Bible, a recurring biblical motif associated with the manifestation of the presence of God
- CLOUD Act (the Clarifying Lawful Overseas Use of Data Act), a United States federal bill
- CLOUD experiment, to investigate the microphysics between galactic cosmic rays and clouds
- Clouds House, a country house in Wiltshire, England
- Fascinator or cloud, a lightweight head-wrap

== See also ==
- Cloudberry
- Cloud Nine (disambiguation)
- Google Cloud
- Red Cloud (disambiguation)
- St. Cloud (disambiguation)
- The Cloud (disambiguation)
- White Cloud (disambiguation)
