= David Sandved =

Norwegian architect

- Born: 17 September 1912; Sandnes, Norway
- Died: 8 March 2001 (aged 88); Haugesund, Norway
- Citizenship: Norwegian
- Occupation: Architect
- Spouse(s): 1938–1947 Sonja Haugan; 1948– Marit (maiden name Furulund) Sandved
- Parent(s): Father Søren Sandved (1884–1946) and mother Berta Mouland (1885–1966)

David Sandved (17 September 1912 – 8 March 2001) was a Norwegian architect.

== Life and work ==
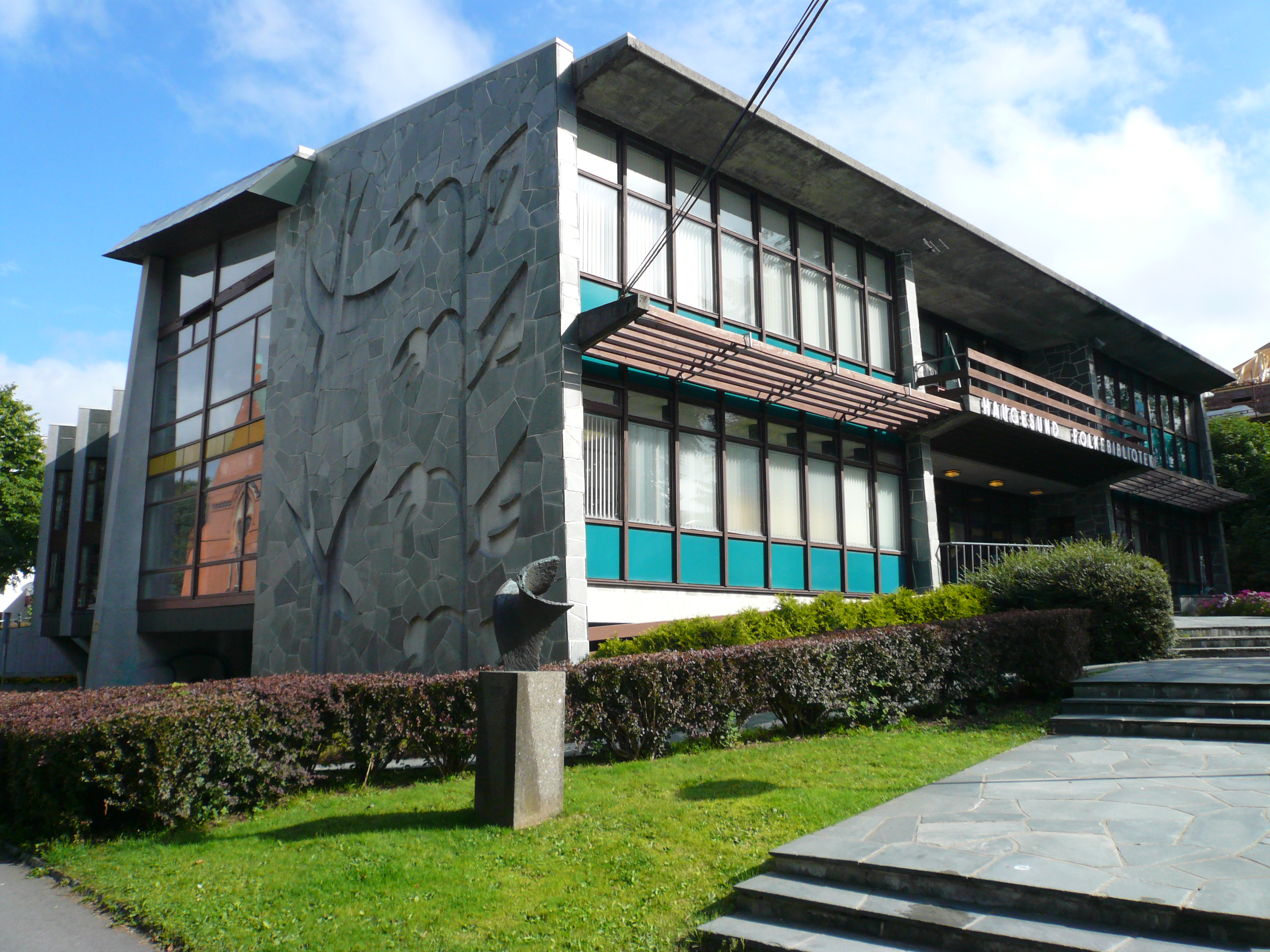
Haugesund public library, 1967.

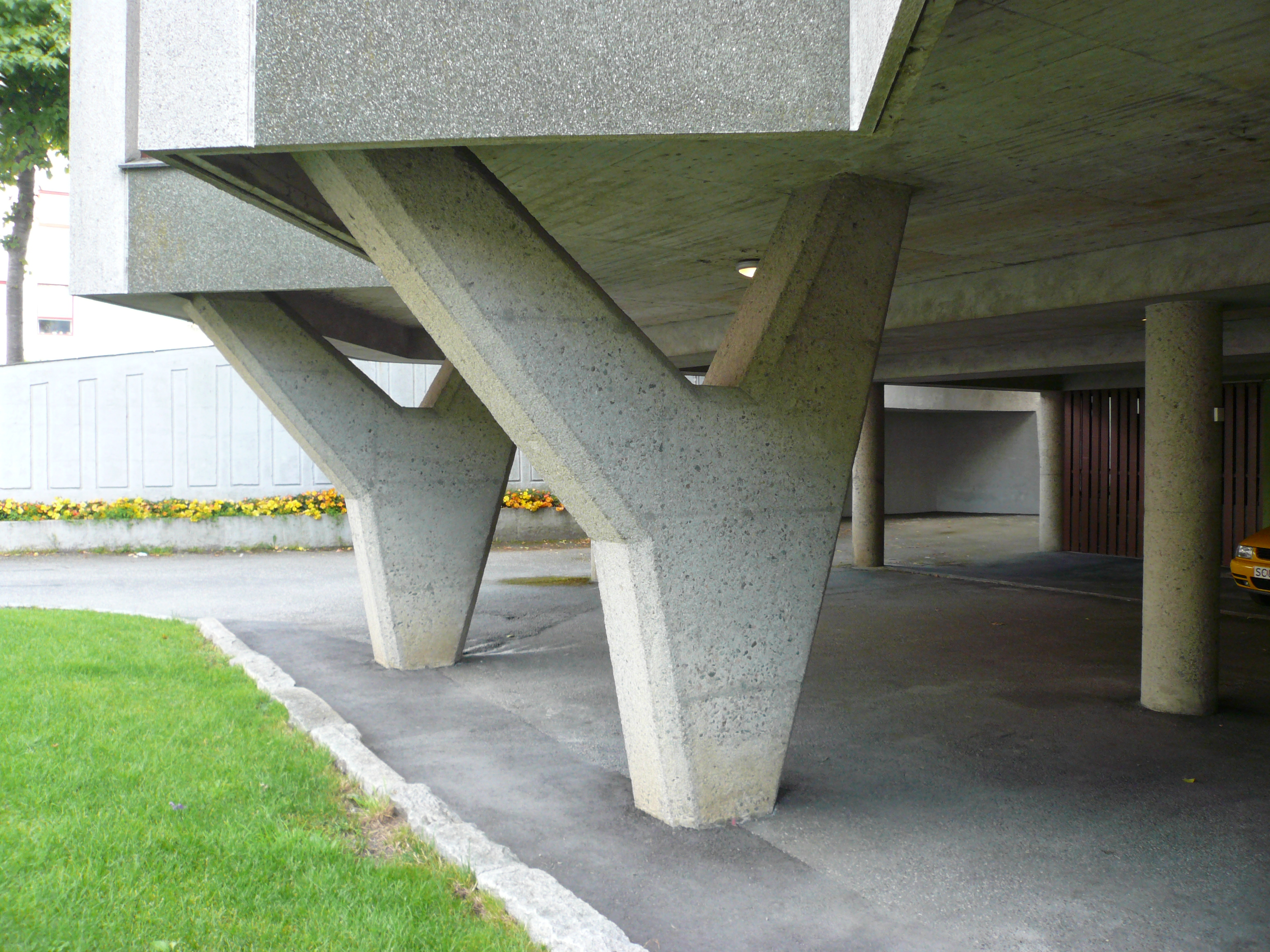
Haugesund public library, y-shaped pillars.

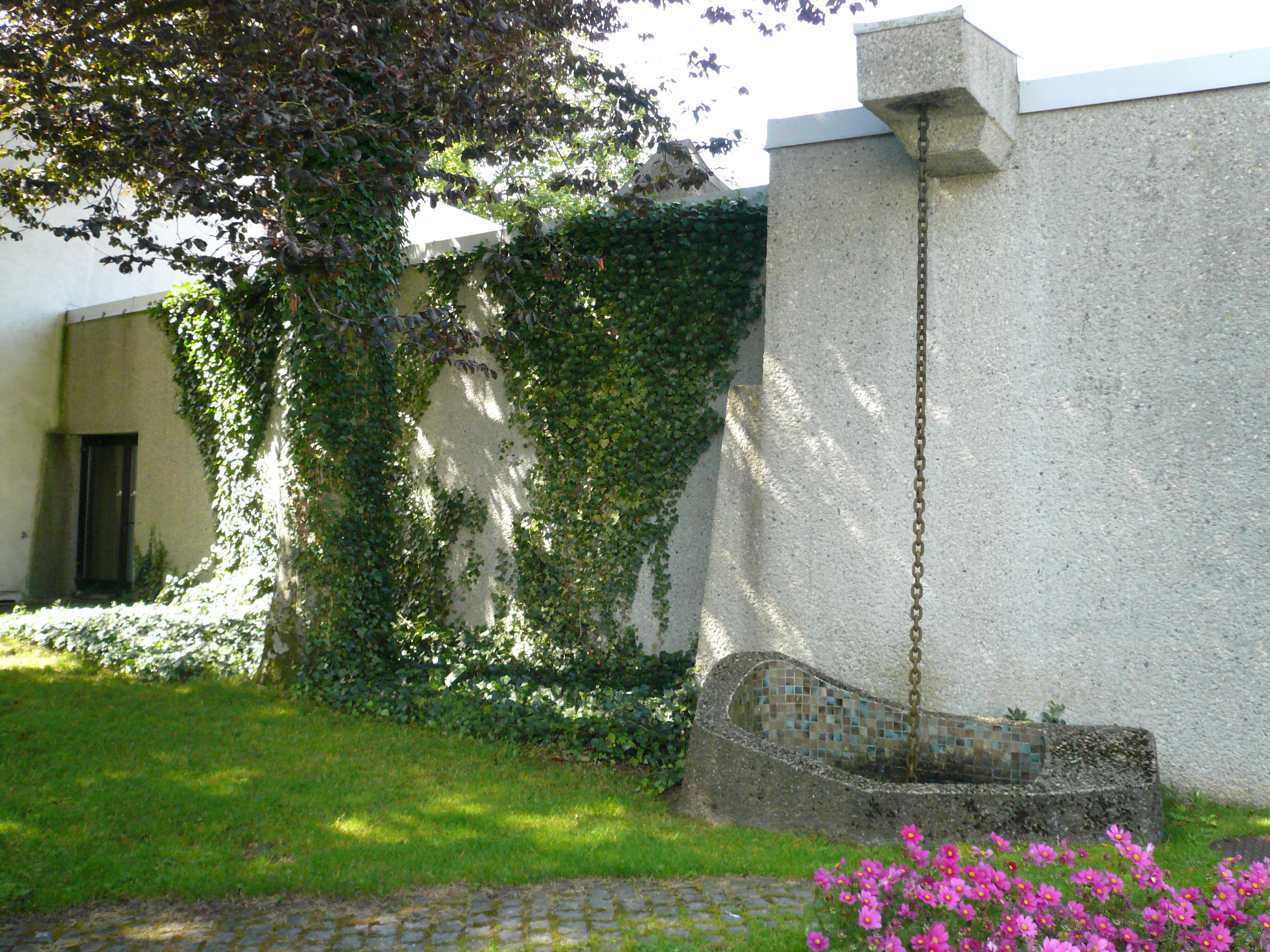
Haugesund Art Gallery (1978), exterior detail with well.

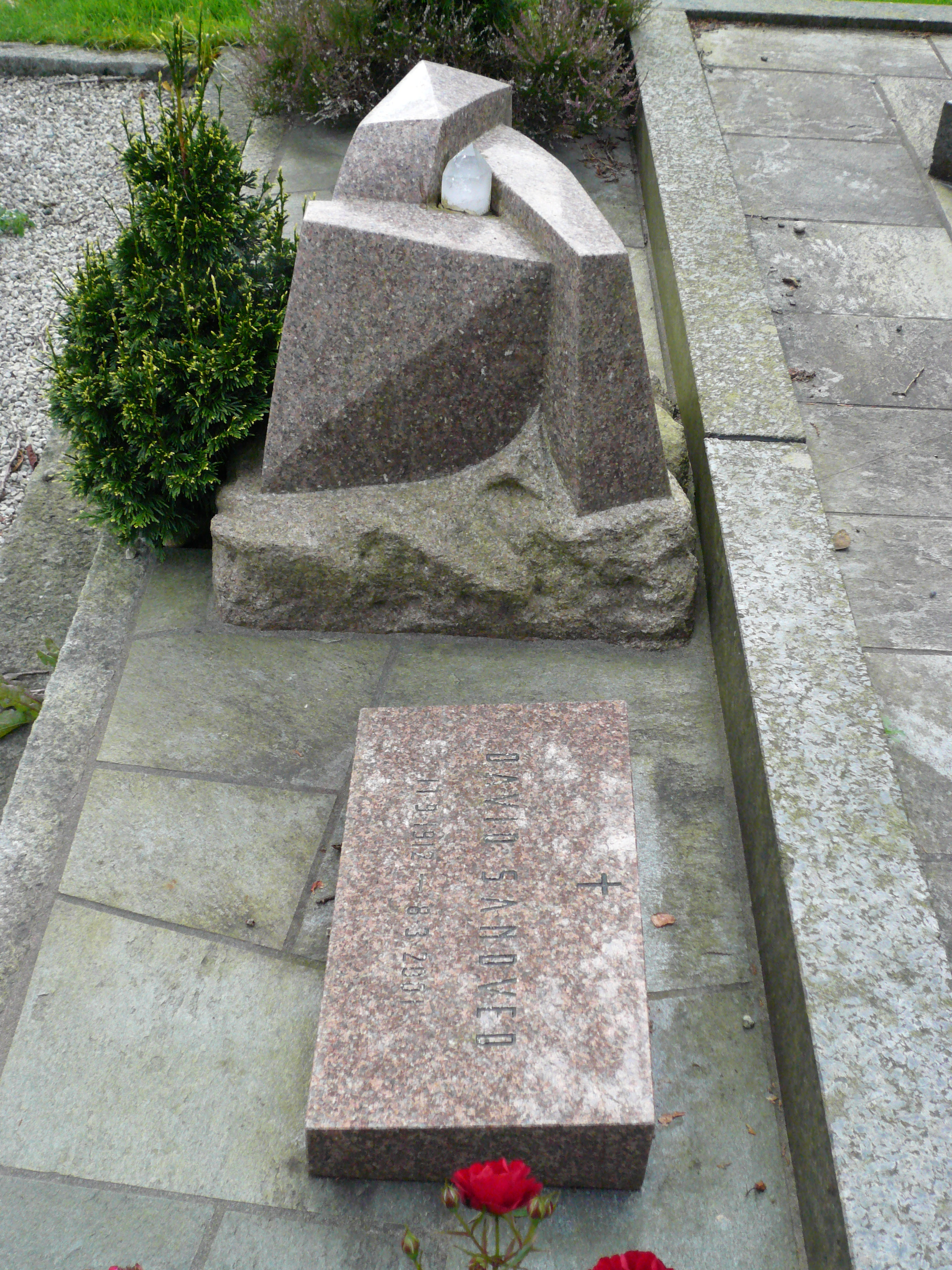
David Sandved's headstone at Christine Elisabeth Gravlund in Haugesund. The tombstone was designed by the architect.

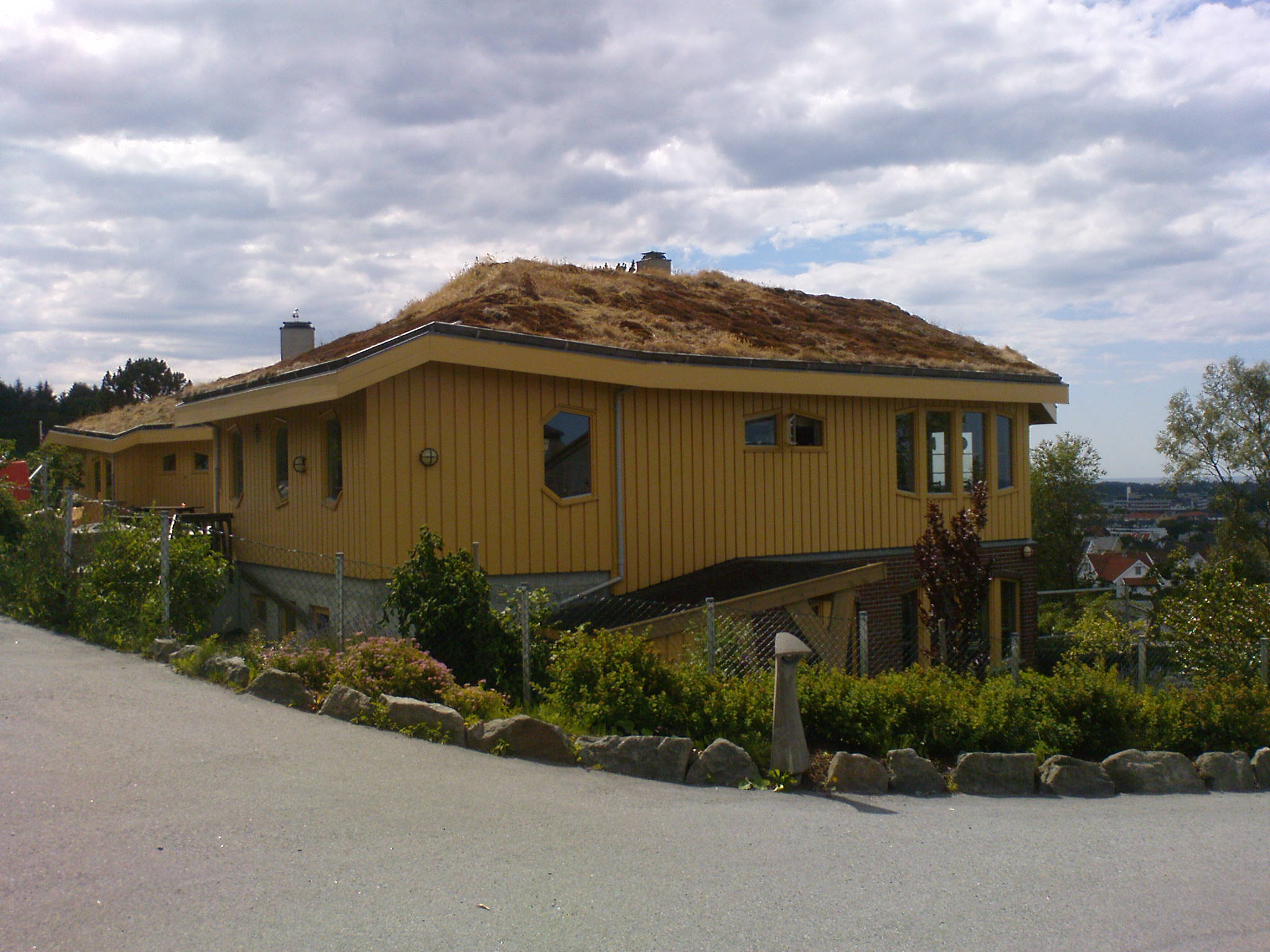
Soria Moria Steiner kindergarten was the last building Sandved designed before he died.

He was born in Sandnes and received his architectural education at the Norwegian Institute of Technology in 1937. He established his own practice in Haugesund. His architecture developed from classical modernism to a form of critical regionalism, using local building motifs and symbols. In 1948 he moved from Oslo to Haugesund to work on ship interiors. He made all the interiors for Christian Haaland's new freight liner's, the «Concordia Line». He designed many different building types, including public, commercial, residential buildings. Sandved was working as an architect to the late 1980s.

From 5 February 1948 to his death he was married to Marit (b. Furulund) Sandved (1918–2009). In the 1950s he was strongly influenced by Rudolf Steiner and his anthroposophy. Sandved also participated actively in the public sphere, defending the composer Fartein Valen and his atonal polyphonic music in the local newspapers. In the 1990s the painter Odd Nerdrum discovered that David Sandved was his biological father.

== Selected works ==
=== Residential buildings ===
- Villa for Direktør Hilmar Onarheim, "Onalund", Valevegen 7, Hystad, Stord (1952).
- Villa for Doctor Simonsen, Breidablikkgaten 217, Haugesund (1957).
- Villa for Lawyer Arne Lothe, Asalvikvegen 17, Haugesund (1961).
- Villa for Doctor Sven Svensen, Skudenesgaten 14b, Haugesund (1966)
- Villa, Vestevegen 45, Haugesund.
- Villa for Shipowner Rasmussen, Salhusveien 15, Haugesund.
- Villa, Kong Sulkes gate 1, Haugesund.
- Villa, Norrønagata 26, Haugesund.
- Villa, Vestevegen 41, Haugesund (1968).
- Presthaug Apartment blocks (Haubo), Presthaugvegen 1-4, Haugesund (1970).
- Ramsdalen Apartment blocks, Haakonsvegen 65, 69, 71, 73 and Solvangveien 45 (1971)

=== Industrial buildings ===
- Haugesund Mekaniske Verksted, administration building, Jens Risøens gate 72, Haugesund (1964)

=== Public buildings ===
- Extension of Hauge Primary school, Haugevegen 31, Haugesund (1954).
- Haugesund Maritime High school (Karmsund videregående skole), Maskinistskolen, Salhusveien 68, Haugesund (1966).
- Haugesund Maritime High school (Karmsund videregående skole), Haugesund kokke- og stuertskole, Salhusveien 68, Haugesund.
- Haugesund Public library, Kirkegata 151, Haugesund (1967).
- Haraldshallen (sports arena), Hanne Hauglands veg 10, Haugesund (1969).
- Haraldsvang Secondary school, Hanne Hauglands veg 9, Haugesund (1967).
- Saltveit Primary school, Tittelsnesvegen 332, Haugesund.
- Haugesund Lillebo institution for mental retarded children, Floraveien 15, Haugesund (1974).
- Haugesund Art Gallery (Haugesund Billedgalleri), Erling Skjalgsonsgate 4, Haugesund (1977–1978).
- Extension of Solvang Secondary school, Hervikvegen 14, Haugesund (1978/79).
- Turnhallen (Gymnastics hall), Hanne Hauglands veg 8, Haugesund.
- Gymnastics- and stage building for Rudolf Steiner School in Haugesund, Skjoldavegen 175, Haugesund.
- Soria Moria Steiner preschool, Skjoldavegen 173, Haugesund.

=== Commercial buildings ===
- Svelland building, Haraldsgaten 140, Haugesund (1965).
- Krohn Brekkebuilding (Cubus), Haraldsgaten 132, Haugesund (1966).
- Sjøhuset (Kyvik), Møllerveien 22, Haugesund (1965–1971).
- Victoriahjørnet (for Christian Haaland), Haraldsgaten 139, Haugesund (1977).
- Bookshop Nils Sundt, Haraldsgaten 159, Haugesund (1978).
- Haugesund Savings Bank, Haraldsgaten 115, Haugesund.

=== Other works ===
- «The Norwegian motif», Europe square (Place de l'Europe) at the Europe tower (Tour de l'Europe) in Mulhouse, France, stone mosaic consisting of 7 different types of marble. The motif shows four birds with symbols of grain, fish, wood and electricity (1964).
- Decorated jewellery boxes, Haugesund Mekaniske Verksted, gifts for naval christenings.

== Selected bibliography ==
- David Sandved, Har vi bruk for en åndsvitenskap? 1999
- David Sandved, Bål ved veien, Dreyer Forlag 1948
- David Sandved, Boka om fargene, Tanum 1946

== Literature ==
- Søndenaa, Marit; Arkitekt David Sandved, 1981
