= Cloud (surname) =

Cloud or Cloude is a surname found in early England and in some Native American families.

== Origins ==
It is not known when a name was first used as a family name and passed from a parent to the children (often from father to son), but instances of the practice are found in Europe approximately 1000 A.D. The family name or surname was often a modification of the father's name, or the name of a landmark or geographical location, an occupation or defining event, the name of a physical object or phenomenon of nature, etc.

The earliest known use of the Cloude/Cloud surname is in medieval England, where it is also recorded as de la Cloude, Clowd and Clowde. The surname may have come from a place name or a geographical feature.

The name is found in Native American families, Chief Red Cloud being an example, but the name was not passed on to his children. (Early Native Americans (indigenous peoples of America) did not use the naming convention of the Europeans, choosing instead to name their children after places, animals, events, religious symbols, etc.)

== Variants ==
(Listed in alphabetical order.)

=== Known variants ===
- Cloud, Cloude, Clowd, Clowde, de la Cloude.

=== Likely variants ===
(References found indicate these names are related to or are the same family(s).)

- Cloudsleigh, Cloudesleigh, Cloudsley, Cloudesley

=== Possible variants ===
(Errors in transcription or personal preference are some of the reasons surnames change over time. The surnames below have similar spelling, sound similar or reflect regional spellings and pronunciations and could be variants of the Cloud/Cloude surname.)

- Calloud, Caloud, Calud, Chlud, Chludn, Claud, Cleod, Clewed, Cllud, Cloda, Cloedt, Cloet, Clood, Cloode, Cloodt, Clou, Clouad, Clouda, Cloudan, Cloudas, Cloudax, Cloudd, Clouded, Clouden, Clouder, Cloudes, Cloudet, Cloudey, Cloudia, Cloudie, Cloudis, Cloudly, Clouds, Cloudsy, Cloudt, Cloudus, Cloudy, Cloue, Clous, Clout, Cloute, Cloutt, Cloutte, Cloux, Clowdas, Clowder, Clowdes, Clowdis, Clowdos, Clowds, Clowdus, Cloyd, Clud, Cluda, Cludas, Cludd, Cludde, Clude, Cludia, Cludie, Cludy, Cluids, Clut, Clutton, Colourde, Klaud, Klauda, Kloede, Klouda, Kloudos, Kloudt, Klude, Klut, Klutton, MacCloud, McCleod, McCloud, McLeod

== People ==
(arranged chronologically by birth date)

- Newton Cloud (1804–1877), American politician and Methodist minister
- David C. Cloud (1817–1903), first attorney general of Iowa, U.S.A.
- Chief Red Cloud (1822–1909), head Chief of the Oglala Lakota (Sioux) from 1868 to 1909
- Col. William F. Cloud (1825–1905) - Cloud County, Kansas was named for him
- Henry Roe Cloud (1884–1950), Winnebago Indian, educator, college administrator, government official, Presbyterian minister, and reformer
- Roger Cloud (1909–1988), Ohio state legislator (R) and auditor 1965–1966, Ohio Republican candidate for governor 1970
- Dr. Preston Cloud, PhD (1912–1991), member National Academy of Sciences, paleontologist, geographer and educator
- Jack Cloud (1925–2010), All-American football player
- Jeff Cloud (politician) (born 1961), American politician from Oklahoma
- Ken Cloude (born 1975), former American Major League Baseball player
- Michael Cloud (born 1975), American politician from Texas
- Natasha Cloud (born 1992), American pro basketball player
- Angus Cloud, (1998–2023), American actor

== Places named for (or thought to be named for) Cloud or variantly spelled families ==
- Aaron G. Cloud House, McLeansboro, Hamilton County, Illinois, U.S.A.
- Abner Cloud House, near Fletcher's Cove, Washington, D.C., U.S.A., 1802, the oldest home on the Patowmack Canal
- Abner Cloud House, Wilmington, Delaware, U.S.A.
- Cloud County, Kansas, U.S.A.
- Cloud's Town, Alabama, now known as New Hope, Madison County, Alabama, U.S.A.
- Clouds House, Wiltshire, England.
- Cloud-Reese House, Wilmington, Delaware, U.S.A.
- Temple Cloud, a village in the Chew Valley, Somerset
