= Reconstructionism =

Reconstructionism may refer to:

- Christian Reconstructionism, a Calvinistic theological-political movement
- Hellenic Polytheistic Reconstructionism, a revival of ancient Greek religion
- Polytheistic reconstructionism, an approach to modern paganism
- Reconstructionist Judaism, a modern American-based Jewish movement
- Zalmoxianism, a rebirth of ancient Dacian religion

== See also ==
- Reconstruction (disambiguation)
  - Reconstruction era, a period in American history following the American Civil War
- Reconstructivism
- The Reconstructionist, a magazine
