= The Cloud =

The Cloud may refer to:

- The Cloud (company), a UK wireless network operator
- Cloud storage, Internet-available storage
  - Cloud computing, resources via the Internet
- The Cloud (hill), a hill in England
- The Cloud, a novel by Ray Hammond
- The Cloud (painting), 1985, by Odd Nerdrum
- "The Cloud" (poem), 1820, by Shelley
- The Cloud, Auckland, a sports venue, New Zealand
- "The Cloud" (Star Trek: Voyager), sixth episode
- The Cloud (2006 film), a German science fiction thriller drama film
- The Cloud (1998 film), a French-Argentine drama film
- The Cloud, an extended play by Cloud Wan, 2022
- "The Cloud" (The Flumps), a children's television episode
- The Cloud, a public art installation in Tirana

== See also ==
- Cloud (disambiguation)
