= Cloud9 (disambiguation) =

Cloud9 is a professional esports organization based in California that sponsor teams that compete in several games.

Cloud9 may also refer to:

- Cloud9 Technologies, a voice turret phone system used by financial traders
- Cloud9 (service provider), a mobile phone company in the Isle of Man
- Cloud9 IDE, an open source cloud web-based integrated development environment
- Cloud9, a fictional big-box store in Superstore (TV series)

== See also ==
- Cloud Nine (disambiguation)
