= Cloud Nine =

Cloud Nine or Cloud 9 is a name colloquially given to the state of euphoria, and may refer to:

== Arts and entertainment ==
- Cloud 9 (play), a 1979 play by Caryl Churchill

=== Books and comics ===
- Cloud 9 (Marvel Comics), a superhero that debuted in Avengers: The Initiative
- Cloud 9 (DC Comics), a young aspiring supervillain who briefly appears 'Red Hood and the Outlaws' (2016)
- Cloud Nine (novel), a 1984 crime novel by James M. Cain

=== Film and television ===
- "Cloud Nine" (Cow and Chicken), a 1999 television episode of Cow and Chicken
- Cloud 9 (2006 film), Burt Reynolds beach volleyball comedy motion picture
- Cloud 9 (2008 film), German film directed by Andreas Dresen
- Cloud 9 (2014 film), Disney Channel Original Movie
- The Ninth Cloud, 2014 independent film directed by Jane Spencer
- Cloud 9 (Superstore), the setting for the TV series Superstore

=== Albums ===
- Cloud Nine (The Temptations album), 1969
- Cloud Nine (George Harrison album), 1987, and the title track
- Cloud 9 (Megan Moroney album), 2026
- Cloud 9 (Nine album), 1996
- Cloud Nine (Kottonmouth Kings album), 2007
- Cloud 9 The EP, a 2008 EP by Tinchy Stryder
- Cloud 9, a 2013 album by Eric Nam
- Cloud Nine (Kygo album), 2016

=== Songs ===
- "Cloud 9" (Baker Boy song), 2017
- "Cloud 9" (Beach Bunny song), 2020
- "Cloud 9" (Megan Moroney song), 2026
- "Cloud 9" (Jamiroquai song), 2017
- "Cloud 9" (Ms. Dynamite and Shy FX song), 2013
- "Cloud Nine" (The Temptations song), 1968
- "Cloud Number Nine", a song by Bryan Adams on his 1998 album On a Day Like Today
- "Cloud 9", a song by Sad Lovers & Giants from their 1982 album Epic Garden Music
- "Cloud 9", a song and 2007 mixtape by B.o.B.
- "Cloud Nine", a song by Owl City from their 2018 album Cinematic
- "Cloud Nine", a song by Evanescence from their 2006 album The Open Door
- "Cloud 9", a song by Puddle of Mudd from their 2003 album Life on Display
- "Cloud 9", a song by Toploader from their 1999 album Magic Hotel
- "Cloud 9", a song by Maaya Sakamoto on Wolf's Rain Original Soundtrack, Volume 2
- "Cloud 9", a song by Robin Thicke from his 2011 album Love After War
- "Cloud 9", a song by Chamillionaire from his 2013 album Reignfall
- "Cloud Nine", a song by Leigh Nash on her 2006 album Blue on Blue
- "Cloud Nine", a song by Onetwo on their 2007 album Instead
- "Cloud Nine", a 2001 song by Kim Lukas
- "Cloud 9", a song by Dove Cameron and Luke Benward from the 2014 film Cloud 9, on the album Disney Channel Play It Loud
- "Cloud 9", a song by Emarosa from their 2016 album 131
- "Cloud Nine", a song by Ben Howard from his 2009 EP These Waters
- "Cloud 9", a song by the boyband Exo from their 2016 album Ex'Act
- "Cloud Nine", a 2018 song by Mind Against from their album Days Gone
- "Cloud 9", a song by Volbeat from their 2019 album Rewind, Replay, Rebound
- "Cloud 9", a song by Reks from his 2009 album More Grey Hairs
- "Cloud 9", a 2014 single by Itro & Tobu for NoCopyrightSounds
- "Cloud 9", a 2026 single by Adam Lambert from his sixth studio album Adam
- “Falling from Cloud 9”, a song by Lift to Experience from their album The Texas-Jerusalem Crossroads

== Companies ==
- CL 9 (Cloud 9), a remote control company
- Cloud9 (service provider), a mobile phone company in the United Kingdom
- Cloud9 IDE, an open source cloud web-based IDE
- CloudNine Communications, a web space / domain company
- Cloud Nine (Shanghai), a 2006 skyscraper and shopping mall in Shanghai
- Cloud Nine Movies, Indian film production and distribution company, based in Chennai
- Cloud9, an American esports organization

== Other uses ==
- Cloud 9 (Siargao), the surf break and venue in Siargao, the Philippines
- Cloud 9, business class on Ethiopian Airlines
- Cloud Nine (sphere), giant sky-floating tensegrity spheres named by Buckminster Fuller
- Cloud 9, Filipino candy bar produced by Universal Robina
- Cloud-9 (RELHIC), a large intergalactic gaseous cloud

== See also ==
- Cloud 7, a 1955 album by Tony Bennett
- Cloud9 (disambiguation)
