= The Cell (film) =

2000 film by Tarsem Singh

- Theatrical release poster
- Directed by: Tarsem Singh
- Written by: Mark Protosevich
- Produced by: Julio Caro; Eric McLeod
- Starring: Jennifer Lopez; Vince Vaughn; Vincent D'Onofrio; Marianne Jean-Baptiste; Jake Weber; Dylan Baker
- Cinematography: Paul Laufer
- Edited by: Paul Rubell; Robert Duffy
- Music by: Howard Shore
- Production company: RadicalMedia
- Distributed by: New Line Cinema (United States); Kinowelt Filmverleih (Germany)
- Release dates: August 18, 2000 (United States); November 23, 2000 (Germany)
- Running time: 107 minutes
- Countries: United States; Germany
- Language: English
- Budget: $33 million
- Box office: $104.1 million

The Cell is a 2000 science fiction psychological horror film directed by Tarsem Singh in his feature directorial debut, written by Mark Protosevich, and starring Jennifer Lopez, Vince Vaughn, and Vincent D'Onofrio. The film follows a team of scientists as they use experimental technology to help a social worker enter the mind of a comatose serial killer in order to locate where he has hidden his latest kidnap victim. Marianne Jean-Baptiste, Jake Weber, Dylan Baker, Tara Subkoff, and Pruitt Taylor Vince appear in supporting roles.

Protosevich began developing the film in the mid-1990s, and sold the screenplay to New Line Cinema in 1998, at which point Singh became attached as director. A co-production between the United States and Germany, The Cell was filmed in 1999 in California, with additional photography occurring in Namibia and Barcelona.

The Cell premiered in the United States in August 2000 and received "deeply divided" reviews from film critics, with some praising the visuals, direction, make-up, costumes and D'Onofrio's performance, and others criticizing the plot, an emphasis on style rather than substance, and masochistic creation. Among the critics who hailed the film was Roger Ebert, who named it one of the ten best films of 2000. It received numerous nominations and awards from various critical associations, including a nomination for the Academy Award for Best Makeup, as well as four Saturn Award nominations. Despite the film's mixed critical response, it was a box office success, grossing over $104 million against a $33 million budget.

== Plot ==
Child psychologist Catherine Deane is hired to conduct an experimental virtual reality treatment for coma patients: a "Neurological Cartography and Synaptic Transfer System" device managed by doctors Henry West and Miriam Kent that allows her to enter a comatose mind and attempt to coax them into consciousness. The technology is funded by the parents of her patient, Edward Baines, a young boy left comatose by a viral infection that causes an unusual form of schizophrenia. Baines's progress has been hampered by a bogeyman-like alter ego whom Deane avoids. Despite Deane's lack of progress, West and Kent reject Deane's suggestion to reverse the feed to bring Baines into her mind, fearing the consequences of his experiencing an unfamiliar world.

Serial killer Carl Rudolph Stargher traps his victims in a cell-like glass enclosure that slowly fills with water by means of an automatic timer, then uses a hoist in his basement to suspend himself above their bodies while watching the recorded video of their deaths. He succumbs to the same schizophrenic illness and falls into a coma just as the FBI identifies him, leaving them without any leads as to the location of his latest victim, Julia Hickson. After learning of this experimental technology, Agent Peter Novak persuades Deane to enter Stargher's mind and discover Hickson's location.

Deane enters the dark dreamscape of Stargher's twisted psyche, filled with doll-like versions of his victims. Stargher's innocent side manifests as Young Stargher and leads Deane through his memories of abuse he suffered at the hands of his sadistic father. Deane nurtures Young Stargher in hopes of obtaining Hickson's location, but she is thwarted by another manifestation: King Stargher, a demonic idealization of his murderous side that dominates the dreamscape. King Stargher torments Deane until she forgets the world is not real. Dr. West discovers this while monitoring Deane's vitals. He warns that what happens to Deane while she is integrated into Stargher's mindscape will inflict neurological damage on her real body. Novak volunteers to enter Stargher's mind to make Deane remember herself.

Inside Stargher's mind, Novak is captured and subjected to King Stargher's torture while Deane looks on as Stargher's servant. Novak reminds Deane of a painful memory of her younger brother who died after a six-month coma due to a car accident during her college years to reawaken her awareness that she is in Stargher's mind. Deane breaks free of Stargher's hold and stabs King Stargher to free Novak. During their escape, Novak sees a version of the glass enclosure with the same insignia as the hoist in Stargher's basement. Novak's team discovers that after the hoist's previous owner went bankrupt, the government hired Stargher to seal up his property in rural Bakersfield. Novak races to the property and finds Hickson treading water in the enclosure and breathing through a pipe. Novak breaks the glass wall and rescues Hickson.

Deane, now sympathetic to Young Stargher, locks her colleagues out and reverses the feed of the device to pull Stargher's mind into her own. She presents a comforting paradise to Young Stargher, but he knows it is only a temporary reprieve from King Stargher. He shifts to Adult Stargher to relate a childhood story of when he drowned an injured bird as a mercy killing to prevent its torture at his father's hands. King Stargher intrudes as a serpentine humanoid, but this time, Deane is in control and she beats him to a bloody pulp before impaling him with a sword. However, Young Stargher exhibits the same injuries as King Stargher, and killing either manifestation kills Stargher. Adult Stargher reminds her of the story of the bird and implores her to "save" him. Deane, appearing as a Virgin Mary-like figure, carries Young Stargher into a pool, putting him out of his misery as Stargher dies in the real world.

In the aftermath, Deane and Novak meet outside of Stargher's house. The FBI has officially excluded the mind technology from their inquiry and Deane has gained approval to use the reverse feed on Edward Baines. Inside the paradise of Deane's mindscape, Baines walks to embrace Deane.

== Cast ==
- Jennifer Lopez as Dr. Catherine Deane
- Vince Vaughn as Special Agent Peter Novak
- Vincent D'Onofrio as Carl Rudolph Stargher
  - Jake Thomas as young Carl Rudolph Stargher
- Marianne Jean-Baptiste as Dr. Miriam Kent
- Jake Weber as Special Agent Gordon Ramsey
- Dylan Baker as Henry West
- James Gammon as Teddy Lee
- Tara Subkoff as Julia Hickson
- Gerry Becker as Dr. Cooperman
- Dean Norris as Cole
- Musetta Vander as Ella Baines
- Patrick Bauchau as Lucien Baines
- Colton James as Edward Baines
- Catherine Sutherland as Anne Marie Vicksey
- Lauri Johnson as Mrs. Hickson
- Pruitt Taylor Vince as Dr. Reid
- Kim Chizevsky-Nicholls as Stargher's victim
- Gareth Williams as Stargher's father
- Peter Sarsgaard as John Tracy (uncredited)

== Production ==
=== Development ===
Screenwriter Mark Protosevich wrote the screenplay for The Cell after a six-year period in the 1990s of writing screenplays in different genres. Protosevich wrote the screenplay at a time when he was "incredibly fascinated by serial killers. I was doing a lot of research about actual serial killers and I found that many of them were victims of extreme abuse when they were children. I was intrigued by the question of whether it was possible to develop compassion for someone who has done terrible, dreadful things, but has suffered their own kind of torture. Or should we not have compassion for a killer because in the end we all have to be held accountable for our actions?"

Many of the science fiction elements of the story were inspired by the film Dreamscape (1984) and various science fiction literature: "I was always curious to see what would happen if I delved into that area too. I had also been having some freaky dreams about drowning, which is one of my great fears, even though oddly enough I swim every day. Writing The Cell was the perfect way to blend together these different areas of interest."

Protosevich envisioned the film's surreal dream sequences as having a similar visual appearance to those in A Nightmare on Elm Street 3: Dream Warriors (1987), but noted that, when director Tarsem Singh became involved in the production, they "became something else entirely, because he was coming from such a richly visual world." Singh's attachment to the project as director was announced in November 1998, with New Line Cinema producing the film. Singh felt the film was a "perfect jumping ground... What interested me was the blank canvas of going into the mind... I wanted to go into the mind and play it like an opera, like theater."

=== Casting ===
Jennifer Lopez was cast as the film's lead in June 1999. In July 1999, it was reported that Vince Vaughn was in "final negotiations" to appear in the film as FBI Agent Peter Novak, along with Marianne Jean-Baptiste playing the role of one of the scientific researchers in the film.

In preparing for his role as Carl Rudolph Stargher, the deviant serial killer in the film, Vincent D'Onofrio isolated himself from his wife and children, and spoke with FBI agents in order to gain a better understanding of the minds of serial murderers. Collaborating with Singh, D'Onofrio developed a makeshift case study of the character to analyze different fragments of his personality.

Singh cast actor Pruitt Taylor Vince in a small role as a physician in the film after having been impressed by his performance in Jacob's Ladder (1990).

=== Filming ===
Principal photography of The Cell began in Los Angeles in late-July 1999. The scene where the Special Agents are trying to convince Dr. Catherine Deane to enter the killer's mind was recorded at the Barcelona Pavilion in Barcelona, Spain. Other filming locations included in Africa at Deadvlei in the Namib-Naukluft National Park, as well as several locations in California, including the Neurosciences Institute in La Jolla, California; Bakersfield; and at Linda Vista Community Hospital in Los Angeles. During filming, screenwriter Protosevich was actively rewriting scenes in the film to help facilitate Singh's visual goals.

In an audio commentary for the film's DVD release, Singh commented that the water-filled tank sequences involving actress Tara Subkoff were marred by difficulties, which he attributed to her struggling with the elements of the scene, specifically being able to hold her breath for extended periods. As a result, some of the scenes were completed using long shots.

=== Artistic influences ===
Some of the scenes in The Cell are inspired by works of art. A scene in which a horse is split into sections by falling glass panels was inspired by the works of British artist Damien Hirst. The film also includes scenes based on the work of other late 20th century artists, including Odd Nerdrum, H. R. Giger and the Brothers Quay. Tarsem—who began his career directing music videos such as En Vogue's "Hold On" and R.E.M.'s "Losing My Religion"—drew upon such imagery for Stargher's dream sequences. In particular, it has been speculated that he was influenced by videos directed by Mark Romanek, such as "Closer" and "The Perfect Drug" by Nine Inch Nails, "Bedtime Story" by Madonna, and the many videos that Floria Sigismondi directed for Marilyn Manson. During a scene, Jennifer Lopez's character falls asleep watching a film; the film is Fantastic Planet (1973).

In the scene where Catherine talks with Carl while he is "cleaning" his first victim, the scenery resembles the music video "Losing My Religion" by R.E.M. The scene where Peter Novak first enters the mind of Carl Stargher, and is confronted by three women with mouths open to the sky, is based on the painting Dawn by Norwegian painter Odd Nerdrum. The scene when Catherine is chasing Carl through a stone hallway, right before she enters the room with the horse, is based on the H. R. Giger painting "Schacht".

In addition to its surreal artistic images, the film also features a number of religious motifs, including Catherine Deane appearing as a figure that resembles Virgin Mary in the film's climactic sequence. Singh responded to criticism of the costume by stating that he had not intended it to appear as the Virgin Mary, but rather as a Brazilian water goddess: "You need to look at her costume the way Indian truck drivers would. They have drawings of gods and goddesses on the backs of matchboxes, and they really kitsch them up, and that was my model. Someone did say she looks like a nun, and I thought, well, if she does, it’s not necessarily a bad thing. I’m not saying anything derogatory in that scene." Singh did concede that the sequence in which Agent Peter Novak has his intestines wound out of his abdomen was inspired by torture methods used during the Catholic Spanish Inquisition.

== Release ==
New Line Cinema released The Cell in the United States on August 18, 2000. It premiered in Australia on November 13, 2000, and in Germany on November 23, 2000.

=== Home media ===
New Line Home Entertainment first released The Cell on VHS and DVD on December 19, 2000. New Line later issued the film on Blu-ray on July 7, 2015.

On January 21, 2025, Arrow Video released the film in limited edition 4K UHD Blu-ray and Blu-ray releases, featuring both the theatrical cut and a director's cut of the film, as well as an unreleased third version featuring an open matte 16:9 aspect ratio and alternate color grading by cinematographer Paul Laufer.

== Reception ==
=== Box office ===
The Cell was a commercial hit in the United States, grossing $17,515,050 during its opening weekend and opening at number one at the U.S. box office. It marked the highest-grossing film opening of Lopez's career at the time. The film largely attracted audience members under the age of 35, and consisted of equal parts male and female moviegoers. It went on to gross $61,334,059 in the United States alone, with 11,369,380 tickets sold nationwide. It earned an additional $5,326,613 in Germany, and $1,552,295 in Australia. Worldwide, it grossed a total of $104,155,843, making it the 32nd highest-grossing film of 2000.

=== Critical response ===
Upon its release, critical reaction to The Cell was "deeply divided," with some praising its visual elements, and others deriding it for its violence. On the review aggregator website Rotten Tomatoes, 45% of 168 critics' reviews are positive, with an average rating of 4.8/10. The website's consensus reads: "The Cell offers disturbing, stunning eye candy, but its visual pleasures are no match for a confused storyline that undermines the movie's inventive aesthetic." Metacritic, which uses a weighted average, assigned the film a score of 40 out of 100, based on 32 critics, indicating "mixed or average" reviews. Audiences surveyed by CinemaScore gave the film a grade "C+" on scale of A to F.

One of the most positive reviews came from Roger Ebert, who awarded the film four stars out of four, writing: "For all of its visual pyrotechnics, it's also a story where we care about the characters; there's a lot at stake at the end, and we're involved. I know people who hate it, finding it pretentious or unrestrained; I think it's one of the best films of the year." Ebert later placed the film on his list of "The Best 10 Movies of 2000", writing: "Tarsem, the director, is a visual virtuoso who juggles his storylines effortlessly; it's dazzling, the way he blends so many notes, styles and genres into a film so original." James Berardinelli gave the film three stars out of four, writing: "The Cell becomes the first serial killer feature in a long time to take the genre in a new direction. Not only does it defy formulaic expectations, but it challenges the viewer to think and consider the horrors that can turn an ordinary child into an inhuman monster. There are no easy answers, and The Cell doesn't pretend to offer any. Instead, Singh presents audiences with the opportunity to go on a harrowing journey. For those who are up to the challenge, it's worth spending time in The Cell." Peter Travers from Rolling Stone wrote that "Tarsem uses the dramatically shallow plot to create a dream world densely packed with images of beauty and terror that cling to the memory even if you don't want them to."

Conversely, Stephen Hunter of The Washington Post called it "contrived", "arbitrary", and "overdrawn". Slate's David Edelstein panned the film as well, writing: "When I go to a serial-killer flick, I don't want to see the serial killer (or even his inner child) coddled and empathized with and forgiven. I want to see him shot, stabbed, impaled, eviscerated, and finally engulfed—shrieking—in flames. The Cell serves up some of the most gruesomely misogynistic imagery in years, then ends with a bid for understanding." Jonathan Rosenbaum of the Chicago Reader remarked, "There's almost no plot here and even less character—just a lot of pretexts for S&M imagery, Catholic decor, gobs of gore, and the usual designer schizophrenia." William Thomas of Empire gave the film two stars out of five, stating that "at times beautiful and always disturbing, this is strangely devoid of meaning."

=== Accolades ===
Award/association	Year	Category	Recipient(s) and nominee(s)	Result	Ref.
Academy Awards	2001	Best Makeup and Hairstyling	Michèle Burke, Edouard F. Henriques	Nominated	
Art Directors Guild	2001	Excellence in Production Design	Tom Foden, Geoff Hubbard, Michael Manson, Guy Hendrix Dyas	Nominated	
Blockbuster Entertainment Awards	2001	Favorite Actress – Science Fiction	Jennifer Lopez	Won	
Blockbuster Entertainment Awards	2001	Favorite Actor - Science Fiction	Vince Vaughn	Nominated	
Blockbuster Entertainment Awards	2001	Favorite Supporting Actor - Science Fiction	Vincent D'Onofrio	Nominated	
Bram Stoker Awards	2001	Best Screenplay	Mark Protosevich	Nominated	
Fangoria Chainsaw Awards	2001	Best Wide-Release Film	The Cell	Nominated	
Fangoria Chainsaw Awards	2001	Best Supporting Actor	Vincent D'Onofrio	Won	
Fangoria Chainsaw Awards	2001	Best Screenplay	Mark Protosevich	Nominated	
Fangoria Chainsaw Awards	2001	Best Score	Howard Shore	Won	
Fangoria Chainsaw Awards	2001	Best Makeup/Creature FX	Michèle Burke	Won	
Hollywood Makeup Artist and Hair Stylist Guild Awards	2001	Best Special Makeup Effects	Jake Garber	Won	
Hollywood Makeup Artist and Hair Stylist Guild Awards	2001	Best Innovative Hair Styling - Feature	Judy Crown, Susan Germaine, Candace Neal	Nominated	
International Horror Guild Awards	2001	Best Film	The Cell	Nominated	
MTV Movie & TV Awards	2001	Best Female Performance	Jennifer Lopez	Nominated	
MTV Movie & TV Awards	2001	Best Villain	Vincent D'Onofrio	Nominated	
MTV Movie & TV Awards	2001	Best Dressed	Jennifer Lopez	Won	
Online Film & Television Association	2001	Best First Feature	Tarsem Singh	Nominated	
Online Film & Television Association	2001	Best Production Design	Tom Foden, Geoff Hubbard, Michael Manson, Tessa Posnasny	Won	
Online Film & Television Association	2001	Best Costume Design	Eiko Ishioka, April Napier	Won	
Online Film & Television Association	2001	Best Visual Effects	Kevin Tod Haug, Clay Pinney	Nominated	
People's Choice Awards	2001	Favorite Actress	Jennifer Lopez	Nominated	
Political Film Society Awards	2001	Award for Peace	The Cell	Nominated	
Phoenix Film Critics Society Awards	2001	Best Cinematography	Paul Laufer	Won	
Phoenix Film Critics Society Awards	2001	Best Costume Design	Eiko Ishioka	Nominated	
Phoenix Film Critics Society Awards	2001	Best Makeup	Michèle Burke, Edouard F. Henriques	Nominated	
Phoenix Film Critics Society Awards	2001	Best Visual Effects	Kevin Tod Haug	Nominated	
Saturn Awards	2001	Best Science Fiction Film	The Cell	Nominated	
Saturn Awards	2001	Best Actress	Jennifer Lopez	Nominated	
Saturn Awards	2001	Best Costume Design	Eiko Ishioka, April Napier	Nominated	
Saturn Awards	2001	Best Makeup	Michèle Burke, Edouard F. Henriques	Nominated	
Taurus World Stunt Awards	2001	Jill Brown	Best High Work	Won	
Teen Choice Awards	2001	Choice Movie: Horror/Thriller	The Cell	Nominated	
Turkish Film Critics Association	2001	Best Foreign Film	Tarsem Singh	18th place	
Young Artist Awards	2001	Best Performance in a Feature Film - Young Actor Age Ten or Under	Jake Thomas	Nominated	

== Sequel ==
A sequel was released direct to DVD on June 16, 2009. The story centers on The Cusp, a serial killer who murders his victims, and then brings them back to life, over and over again until they beg to die. Maya (Tessie Santiago) is a psychic investigator and surviving victim of The Cusp, whose abilities developed after spending a year in a coma. Maya must use her powers to travel into the mind of the killer unprotected, in order to save his latest victim.

== See also ==
- Dreamscape (1984 film)
- Paperhouse (film)
- Eiko Ishioka
