= Odd Nerdrum =

Norwegian figurative painter (born 1944)

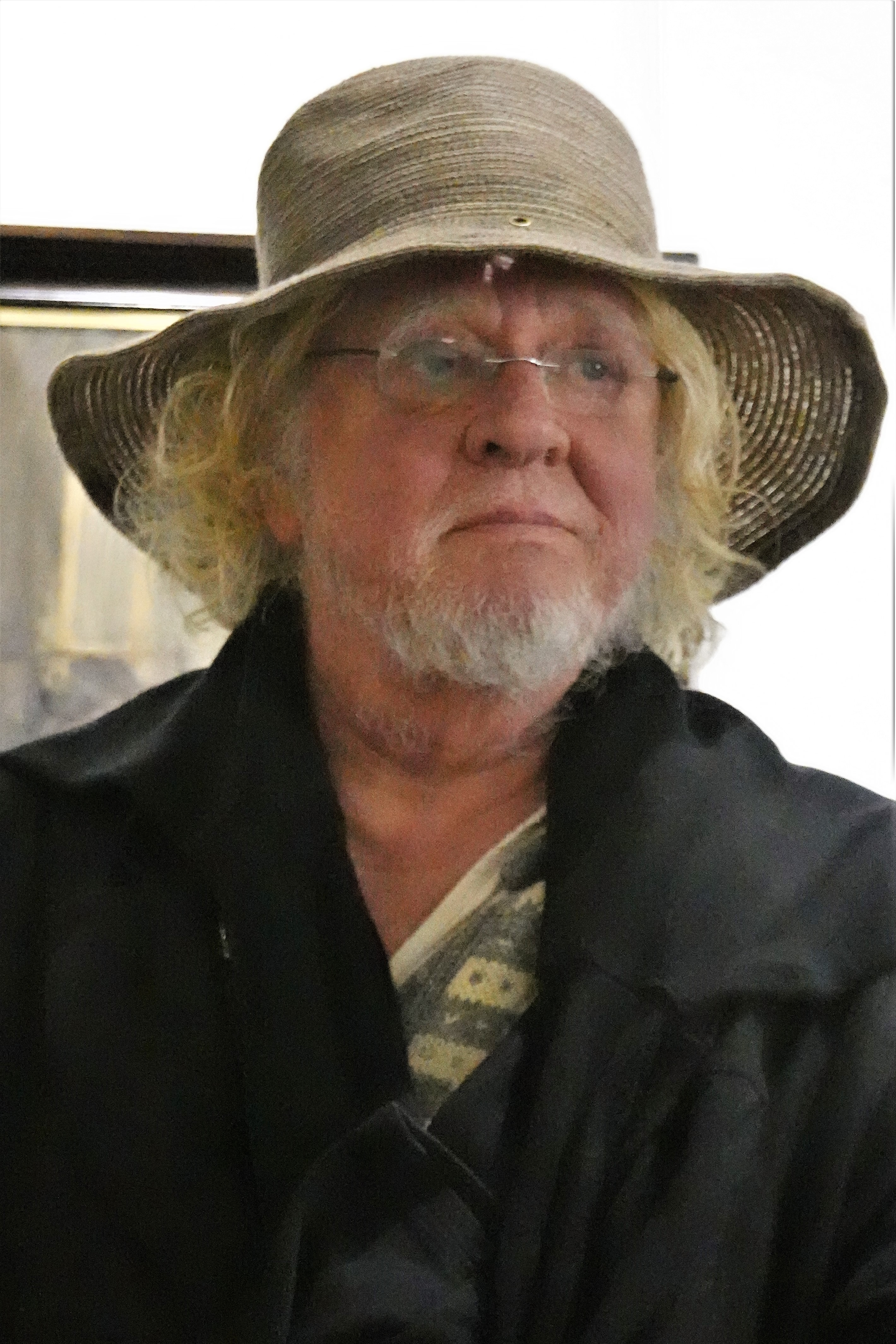
- Nerdrum at Gallen-Kallela Museum, Finland, in 2020
- Born: 8 April 1944 (age 82); Helsingborg, Sweden
- Education: Joseph Beuys
- Known for: Painting
- Movement: Kitsch movement

Odd Nerdrum (born 8 April 1944) is a Norwegian figurative painter. A controversial figure in Norway, he is known for his anti-modernist stance while he is also admired internationally for his skill and technique, as well as his extraordinary subject matter. Themes and style in Nerdrum's work reference anecdote and narrative. Primary influences by the painters Rembrandt and Caravaggio help place his work in direct conflict with abstraction and conceptual art. Works include still life paintings of small, everyday objects, portraits and self-portraits, and large paintings allegorical and apocalyptic in nature. The figures in Nerdrum's paintings are often dressed as if from another time and place.

Nerdrum was educated at Oslo Waldorf School and later at the Art Academy of Oslo. Disillusioned with the art form taught at the academy and with modern art in general Nerdrum began to teach himself to paint in a post-modern style with Rembrandt and Caravaggio as influences. In 1965, he began a several-months study with the German artist Joseph Beuys. In Fenomenet Nerdrum (transl. The Nerdrum Phenomenon), Jan-Erik Ebbestad Hansen traces Nerdrum's sense of belonging in older cultural traditions, his skepticism toward a rationality that rejects the spiritual in nature and humanity, and his aversion to modern technology and ways of life, back to the influence of anthroposophy.

Nerdrum says that his art should be understood as kitsch rather than art as such. On Kitsch, a manifesto composed by Nerdrum, describes the distinction he makes between kitsch and art. Nerdrum's philosophy spawned the Kitsch movement among his students and followers, who call themselves kitsch painters rather than artists.

== Biography ==
=== Early life ===
Nerdrum was born in Helsingborg, Sweden in April 8, 1944 to lawyer and airline director Johan Nerdrum and shipowner's daughter Edith Marie (Lillemor) Nerdrum. His parents, then Norwegian resistance fighters had fled German-occupied Norway to Helsingborg, Sweden during World War II where subsequently Nerdrum was born. One year later, following the end of the war, Odd and his family returned to Norway. In 1950, Nerdrum's parents divorced, leaving Nerdrum's mother, Lillemor, to raise two small children, Odd, and his younger brother.

Soon after Nerdrum's mother Lillemor went to New York to study at the Fashion Institute of Technology, leaving Nerdrum feeling unwanted and abandoned; this feeling would stay with him until he was in his late forties. Nerdrum's father, Johan Nerdrum, later remarried. Although he was supportive of Odd, he kept an emotional distance between himself and his son. At his death, Odd was asked not to attend the funeral.

In 1993, Nerdrum discovered that his father was not his biological father and his mother had had a previous relationship with the swedish architect David Sandved prior her marriage which had resumed during the war. Odd, was in fact, the result of a liaison between architect David Sandved and Lillemor. Richard Vine, art critic, describes this episode in Nerdrum's life as one which created "a conflicted preoccupation with origins and personal identity", that "came natural to Nerdrum" and was represented in his pictures. He would go on to make paintings about these experiences.

=== Early education ===
Nerdrum began his formal education in 1951 in Oslo, attending the private Oslo Waldorf School (Rudolf Steinerskolen i Oslo). In Norway the Waldorf schools had been strongly associated with the cultural and intellectual elite of the country since the early 20th century, and the school attracted a combination of children of artists, academics and financial elites. This education would set Odd apart from his contemporaries. The Waldorf system was based on the philosophies of Austrian Guru Rudolf Steiner and the tenants of anthroposophy, which saw mankind as once living in harmony with the universe but now existing in a lesser state of rationality. Through spiritual or esoteric practice, Steiner believed mankind could find its way back to a connection with higher realities and to renewed harmony with the universe. Learning for students was often kinesthetic, for example, through dramatic enactments of history and fantasy, and through musical exercises that were reminiscent of the patterns found on ancient Greek vases, depicting figures moving in parallel patterns. These parallel patterns could be found in later Nerdrum work, as can a sensibility for iconographic images and costume.

Jens Bjørneboe, Norwegian author and mentor, said Nerdrum at a young age exhibited tendencies of innate talent and industry, but also impatience with those with less ability than himself.

=== Later Life ===
Odd Nerdrum has been married to fellow painter & artistic director of the Nerdrum Studio, Turid Spildo since 1995. They have two sons, Öde and Bork; and twin daughters, Aftur and Myndin. Their adult children are engaged in creative endeavours, including fine & visual art, documentary making, as well as theatre production and acting.

== Artistic study ==
Nerdrum began study at the Norwegian National Academy of Fine Arts, but became dissatisfied with the direction of modern art, notably Rauschenberg's work, and began to teach himself how to paint in a Neo-Baroque style, with the guidance of Rembrandt's technique and work as a primary influence. Nerdrum had seen Rembrandt's painting, The Conspiracy of Claudius Civilis in the National Museum of Fine Arts in Stockholm. Nerdrum says seeing the painting was "a shock... Pervasive. Like finding home. I can say I found a home in this picture,... The wonderful thing with Rembrandt is the confidence he inspires - like when you warm your hands on a stove. Without Rembrandt I would have been so poor". By abandoning the accepted path of modern art, Nerdrum had placed himself in direct opposition to most aspects of the school, including his primary painting instructor, his fellow students, and a curriculum designed to present Norway as a country with an up-to-date artistic culture. He, in his own words, was chased from the academy after a two-year period like a "scroungy mutt". Years later Nerdrum said:

I saw that I was in the process of making a choice that would end in defeat. By choosing those qualities that were so alien to my own time, I had to give up at the same time the art on which the art of our time rests. I had to paint in defiance of my own era without the protection of the era's superstructure. Briefly put I would paint myself into isolation.

Nerdrum later studied with Joseph Beuys, at the Kunstakademie Düsseldorf. However, he continued to feel isolated from the other students, who nicknamed him "Zorn" from the notorious Swedish "flesh-painter."

Since the 1980s, Odd Nerdrum has been receiving students, like Amy Sherald and Sarah McRae Morton, to study at his home in France, Iceland and today; in Norway and Sweden.

== Influences ==
Rembrandt and Caravaggio are primary influences on Nerdrum's work, while secondary influences include Masaccio, Leonardo da Vinci, Michelangelo, Titian, and the less obvious influences, according to Vine and either mentioned by Nerdrum himself or other critics, that include Pieter Bruegel the Elder, Goya, Chardin, Millet, as well as the even less apparent Henry Fuseli, Caspar David Friedrich, Ferdinand Hodler, Edvard Munch, Käthe Kollwitz, Salvador Dalí, Chaïm Soutine and Lars Hertervig.

== Direction ==
=== Early work (1964–1982) ===
Nerdrum's work from the first twenty years of his artistic life consisted of large canvasses, generally polemic in nature, that served to refute accepted social or economic viewpoints. The work from this period was highly representational and detailed in nature with often careful attention to contemporary references, such as in clothing, or in the model of a bicycle as in the painting The Arrest. Vine notes that, Nerdrum's influence was not, as might be expected, given the themes of the work, the ideological Ashcan school movement, although similar in subject matter. In 1968, Nerdrum had viewed for the first time the works of Caravaggio whose psychologically intense work, use of cross lighting, strongly suggested shadow that implied three dimensionality, and use of the faces of real, everyday people impacted him intensely, and provided one of the major influences for his work of this time period. He would revisit Italy and Caravaggio's work for on-going inspiration for many years.

As well, Nerdrum was a reader of visionary literature that included works by Rudolf Steiner, William Blake, Dostoyevsky, and the Swedenborg. This would influence him towards a more vertical sensibility rather than the linear Marxist view based on revolution that influenced most artists with socially reformist sensibilities.

As a young student, Nerdrum had encountered the works of the master painters in the National Museum. In particular, Rembrandt's The Conspiracy of Claudius Civilis (1661) acted as a powerful antidote to his sensibilities. His disillusionment with modern art, such as Robert Rauschenberg's Monogram, a stuffed goat with a tire around its middle section standing on a flat, littered surface, which Nerdrum had encountered in the Museum of Modern Art in Stockholm, filled the young artist with disgust.

These influences both positive and negative would impact all of Nerdrum's work. A turning point in Nerdrum's work - the end of Nerdrum's more contemporary scene-like work, and the movement towards more Rembrandt-like painting elements- revolved around the enormous (11x16¾ foot) Refugees At Sea (1979–1980). Nerdrum, according to Vine, later considered the work to be naive in the sense that Rousseau defines the word, in which mankind is seen as innocent and innately good. In the painting Nerdrum endows the refugees, 27 Vietnamese boat people, with heroic stature, but in a highly sentimentalized manner that Nerdrum later described as "cloying".

=== Change in direction ===
In 1981 Nerdrum created a seminal work that would serve to indicate a change in direction from the sentimentalized view of Refugees at Sea to a starker, unadorned view of reality. Twilight, a rear view of a young woman alone in a wooded landscape defecating, offers nothing sentimental or ideal in its betrayal, but instead offers a stripped away view of life and reality.

Paintings were no longer as multi-figured as they had been with Refugees at Sea, and still lifes were of individual objects such as a brick or loaf of bread. The individuals who now populated Nerdrum's paintings were imbued with great quiet and stillness, but as Vine says, additionally were vitally alive, evoking a cosmic oneness that transcended individuality.

These figures — types rather than endowed with features or apparent stories that might distinguish them as individual — were costumed in garments that seemed timeless such as furs, skins, or leather caps, rather than in clothing that would link the viewer to a specific time and place.

Archetypal-like, these beings, inhabited pre-social, apocalyptic-like circumstances that included stark, severe landscapes, a reference to some place beyond our own time and space.

== Painting technique ==
Nerdrum's approach to painting is based on traditional methods that included mixing and grinding his own pigments, working on canvas he had stretched or is stretched by assistants rather than on pre-stretched canvas, and working from live models, often himself, and in many cases members of his own family. In 2011, Nerdrum stated that the technique he used in the 1980s was faulty, "a special mixture of oils and wax in an effort to recreate the style of the old masters" which subsequently melted and disintegrated.

=== Process ===
Of his process Nerdrum says: "When I paint as if I struggle in the water. I will try with all means not to drown. Sandpaper, rags, my fingers, the knife--in short everything. The brush is rarely used."

== Drawings and prints ==
Odd Nerdrum prints are based on his paintings. For example, an etching entitled Baby is based on a painting of the same title from 1982. Nerdrum refers to his highly finished, charcoal drawings as "paintings" Often his drawings are large in scale and are works in their own right, as well as being studies for future paintings.

== On kitsch ==
Odd Nerdrum has declared himself to be a kitsch-painter identifying himself with kitsch rather than with the contemporary art world. Initially, Nerdrum's declaration was thought to be a joke, but later, and with the publication of articles and books on the subject, Nerdrum's position can be seen as an implied criticism of contemporary art.

== Court cases ==
In 2011, Nerdrum was convicted in Norway of tax evasion and sentenced to two years in prison. An appeal was filed. His defense claimed that a very large amount of money stored in a safe deposit box in Austria was "a safety measure against future claims" for some 36 paintings that Nerdrum had created in the 1980’s using an experimental medium which began to melt when exposed to heat." The sentence was criticised as excessive while art professor Øivind Storm Bjerke called the sentence "strict". Supporters stated that there were flaws in the proceedings of the trial, such as faulty evidence. Nerdrum claimed the case was an attempt at political persecution.

In January 2012, the Norwegian court of appeal granted Nerdrum a new trial. The trial began on 11 June. After three trial days, Nerdrum was once again convicted of tax evasion and sentenced to two years and ten months in prison. In 2013, the verdict was set aside by the Supreme Court of Norway; in 2014 court of appeals found him guilty of tax evasion and he was sentenced to 20 months in prison; 8 months were suspended. Under Norwegian law, Nerdrum would be forbidden from any painting activity in prison, as prisoners in Norway are not allowed to pursue business activities while incarcerated.

In October 2012, Nerdrum lost a suit filed against the regional tax authority. The Oslo court ruled that the funds that Nerdrum had set aside in Austria did not constitute a 'loan, security, depot or committed funds' and should have been disclosed as income.

In September 2017 Nerdrum was pardoned by King Harald V of Norway.

== Nerdrum's work as inspiration ==
A 2000 horror film, The Cell, contains a scene that was heavily influenced by Nerdrum's 1989 painting Dawn. The scene features three identical figures sitting down, looking upwards with pained, trance-like expressions on their faces. Director Tarsem Singh in the film's audio commentary says that the painting was the inspiration for the scene's imagery. Singh had seen the painting while visiting the owner of the painting, David Bowie.

Australian choreographer, Meryl Tankard's 2009 dance piece, The Oracle, was inspired by the work of Nerdrum. The work, featuring the dancer Paul White, was about the human being in constant struggle with forces outside of himself.

The Norwegian classical composer Martin Romberg wrote a collection of piano pieces inspired by three of Nerdrum's works in 2014, named Tableaux Kitsch. The pieces are inspired by the paintings To the Lighthouse, Stranded, and Drifting, and were premiered at Nerdrum's exhibitions in Paris 2013 and Barcelona 2016.

== Art market ==
Nerdum's highest selling painting, Dawn, was sold at Sotheby's London, for £341,000 ($428,637), on 11 November 2016. This was a new record for the artist, surpassing the previous one held by The Cloud from 2008.

== Collections ==
Odd Nerdrum's work is held in public collections worldwide including the National Gallery, in Oslo, the Astrup Fearnley Museum of Modern Art, in Oslo, the Hirshhorn Museum and Sculpture Garden, in Washington, D.C., the Metropolitan Museum of Art, in New York, the New Orleans Museum of Art, in New Orleans, the Museum of Contemporary Art San Diego, in San Diego, and the Walker Art Center, in Minneapolis.

Odd Nerdrum is represented by the Forum Gallery, New York.

== Exhibitions ==
- Skiens Kunstforening, Skien, Norway "Minner" June–September 2017
- Galleri Agardh Tornvall, Stockholm, Sweden "Making Painting Great again" November 2017
- Mollbrink's Art Gallery, Uppsala, Sweden "Making Painting great again" March 2018

== Publications ==
- Odd Nerdrum, Joacim Ericsson, Per Lundgren, David Molesky, Richard T. Scott, Richard Vine. The Nerdrum School: The Master and His Students. Oslo, Norway: Orfeus Publishing, Nov. 2013. ISBN 978-91-87543-04-3.
- Odd Nerdrum, Jan-Ove Tuv, Bjorn Li, Dag Solhjell, Tommy Sorbo, Maria Kreyn, Kitsch: More than Art. Oslo, Norway: Schibsted 2011. ISBN 978-82-516-3638-4.
- Odd Nerdrum, Bjørn Li. Odd Nerdrum: themes: paintings, drawings, prints and sculptures. Oslo, Norway: Press Publishing, 2007. ISBN 82-7547-226-1.
- Odd Nerdrum and Richard Vine. Odd Nerdrum: paintings, sketches and drawings. Oslo, Norway: Gyldendal Fakta, 2001. ISBN 82-489-0121-1.
- Odd Nerdrum, On Kitsch Oslo, Norway: Kagge Publishing, 2001 ISBN 978-8248901235
- Odd Nerdrum and Jan-Erik Ebbestad Hansen. Odd Nerdrum: paintings. Oslo, Norway: Aschehoug, 1995. ISBN 82-03-26063-2.
- Odd Nerdrum, Jan Åke Pettersson and Astrup Fearnley Museet for Moderne Kunst. Odd Nerdrum: storyteller and self-revealer. Oslo, Norway: Astrup Fearnley museet for moderne kunst: Aschehoug, 1999. ISBN 82-03-22272-2.
- Odd Nerdrum, Richard Vine, E John Bullard and New Orleans Museum of Art. Odd Nerdrum, the drawings. New Orleans, Louisiana: New Orleans Museum of Art, 1994. ISBN 0-89494-047-3.
