= Reconstruction =

Reconstruction may refer to:

== Types ==
=== Politics, history, and sociology ===
- Reconstruction (law), the transfer of a company's (or several companies') business to a new company
- Perestroika (Russian for "reconstruction"), a late 20th century Soviet Union political movement
- Economic reconstruction
- The Reconstruction era of the United States, the period after the American Civil War, 1865–1877

=== Science and scholarship ===
- Ancestral reconstruction, the analysis of organisms' relationships via genome data
- Critical reconstruction, an architectural theory related to the reconstruction of Berlin after the end of the Berlin Wall
- Historical reconstruction
- Memorial reconstruction, a hypothesis regarding the transcription of 17th-century plays
- Rational reconstruction, a philosophical term with several meanings
- Linguistic reconstruction

=== Technology ===
- 3D reconstruction in computer vision
- 3D sound reconstruction
- Cone beam reconstruction, a computational microtomography method
- Event reconstruction, the interpretation of signals from a particle detector
- Iterative reconstruction, methods to construct images of objects
- Reconstruction (architecture), the act of rebuilding a destroyed structure
- Signal reconstruction, the determination of an original continuous signal from samples
- Single particle reconstruction, the combination of multiple images of molecules to produce a three-dimensional image
- Surface reconstruction, the process which alters atomic structure in crystal surfaces
- Tomographic reconstruction
- Vector field reconstruction, the creation of a vector field from experimental data

=== Other ===
- Crime reconstruction
- Forensic facial reconstruction, the process of recreating the face of an individual from its skeletal remains
- In-vivo reconstruction, art genre attempting to depict prehistoric life according to scientific evidence
- Reconstructive surgery
- Shooting reconstruction

== Titles ==
=== Films ===
- Reconstruction (1968 film), a Romanian tragicomedy
- Reconstruction (2001 film), about the 1959 Ioanid Gang bank heist in Romania
- Reconstruction (2003 film), a Danish psychological romantic drama
- The Reconstruction (film), a 1970 Greek art film

=== Music ===
- Reconstruction (band), featuring Jerry Garcia, Nick Kahner and John Kahn
- Reconstruction (Hugh Masekela album), 1970
- Reconstruction (Max Romeo album), 1977
- Reconstruction (Lecrae album), 2025
- Reconstructions (Don Diablo album), 2018
- Reconstructions (Kerry Livgren album), 1987

=== Television ===
- "Reconstruction" (Jericho episode)
- Red vs. Blue: Reconstruction, a machinima comedy series

=== Other uses ===
- Reconstruction (magazine), a monthly edited by Allan L. Benson from 1919 to 1921
- ReConStruction, a 2010 science fiction convention

== See also ==
- Reconstructionism (disambiguation)
- Doctor Who missing episodes§Reconstruction
- Deconstruction
