= Dawn (painting) =

1989 painting by Odd Nerdrum

- Artist: Odd Nerdrum
- Year: 1989
- Medium: Oil on canvas
- Dimensions: 190.7 cm × 283.5 cm (75.1 in × 111.6 in)
- Location: Private collection

Dawn is an oil on canvas painting by the Norwegian artist Odd Nerdrum, painted in 1989. It is held in a private collection.

== Description ==
The painting depicts four identical men in a grey rocky landscape. The men are seen from the side as they sit on the ground, largely naked, with skull caps and leather wrapped around their shoulders; they face the sky above them with closed eyes and open mouths. Each of the men has a staff lying in the ground, near them.

It is one of Nerdrum's largest paintings and one he has said he is "very pleased with".

== History ==
Dawn was shown at Høstutstillingen in 1989. The rock musician David Bowie bought it at the Raab Gallery in Berlin in the autumn of 1990. According to Dagens Næringsliv, Bowie paid 1.5 million Norwegian kroner for the painting. While visiting Oslo on 22 October 1991 for a performance with Tin Machine, Bowie organised an hour-long meeting with Nerdrum, during which he asked Nerdrum to tell him as much as possible about his worldview and the symbols behind the painting.

Dawn has been reproduced repeatedly in the body of literature on Nerdrum. It was part of the solo exhibitions dedicated to the artist at the Gerald Piltzer Galerie in Paris in 1994 and the Astrup Fearnley Museum of Modern Art in Oslo in 1998.

== Art market ==
Following Bowie's death it was sold at auction on 11 November 2016. Sotheby's had estimated its value at 60,000—80,000 GBP, but it was sold for £341,000 ($428,637). This was a new record for a Nerdrum painting, surpassing the record held by The Cloud from 2008.

== Influence ==
The 2000 American film The Cell, directed by Tarsem Singh, has a scene that is strongly inspired by Dawn. According to Singh, he had seen the painting while visiting Bowie in his home.

== Literature ==
- Jan-Erik Hansen, Odd Nerdrum: Malerier, Oslo, 1994, illustrated p.207;
- Jan Pettersson, Odd Nerdrum: Storyteller and Self-Revealer, Oslo, 1999, no.50, illustrated p.109;
- Odd Nerdrum, Odd Nerdrum: Temaer: Malerier, Tegninger, Grafikk Og Skulpturer, Oslo, 2007, illustrated p.551;
- Richard Vine, Inger Schjoldager, and Louisa Charles, The Nerdrum School: The Master and His Students, Stockholm, 2013, illustrated p.6 (detail) and illustrated p.196;
- Barbara Vetland, Tidloes Omsorg, Mor Og Barn-Motivet I Odd Nerdrums Malerier: Et Essay, Oslo, 2013, illustrated p.23.
