= RELHIC =

Theoretical construct in astrophysics

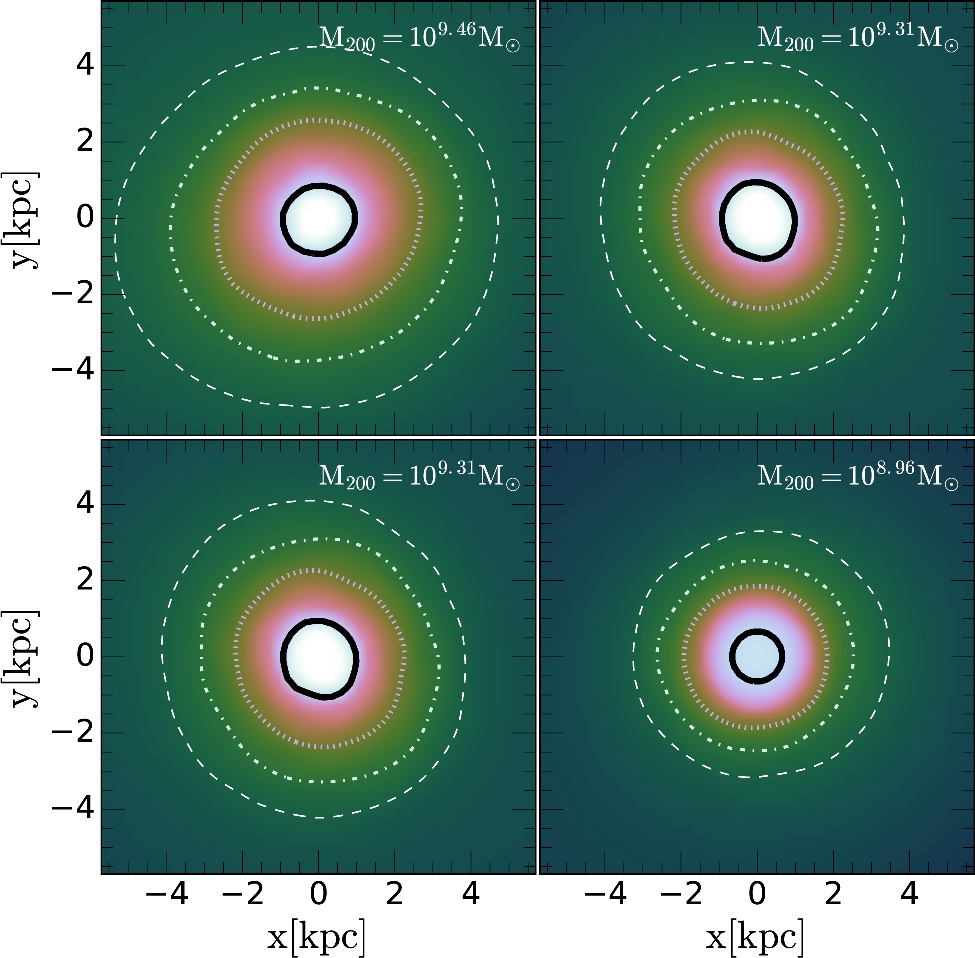
Neutral hydrogen column density maps of four RELHICs.

A RELHIC, or Reionization-Limited HI Cloud, is a theoretical construct in astrophysics that describes a type of dark matter halo containing neutral hydrogen gas. These clouds are characterized by their potential to reveal the nature of dark matter and the conditions for galaxy formation in the early universe, particularly during the epoch of reionization. RELHICs are thought to be spherical gaseous systems that are in hydrostatic equilibrium and are influenced by both the presence of dark matter and a background ultraviolet radiation field from stars and galaxies.

The concept of RELHICs was proposed by astrophysicists Alejandro Benitez-Llambay and Julio F. Navarro, as part of their work on cosmological simulations and observations. They suggest that these structures could serve as observational targets to better understand the nature of dark matter and the formation of galaxies.

In 2023, a RELHIC candidate, referred to as Cloud-9, was detected near the spiral galaxy Messier 94.
