= Kitsch movement =

Artistic movement

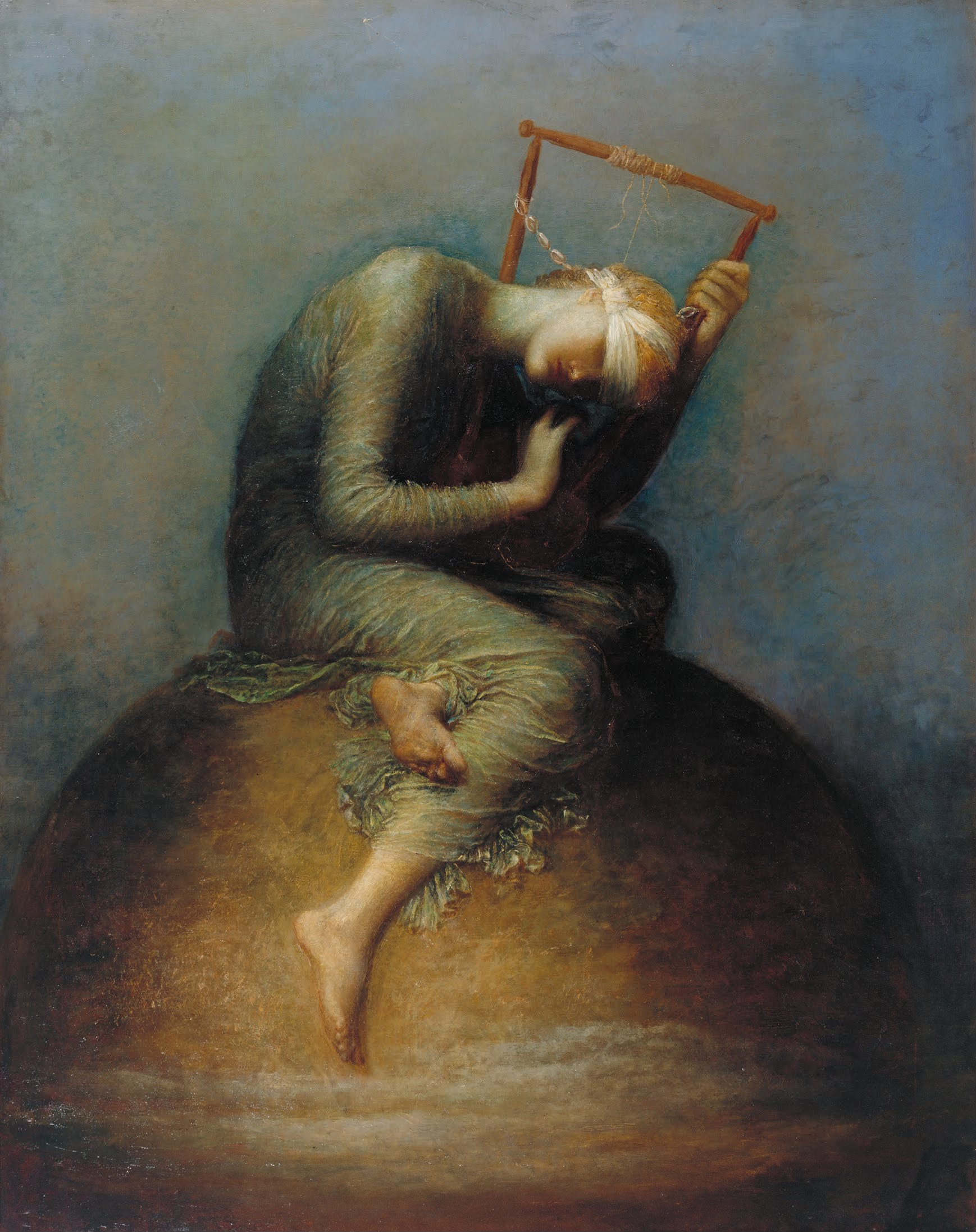
Hope, George Frederic Watts, 1886. Cover of On Kitsch by Odd Nerdrum and others. (Note: Odd Nerdrum, Sindre Mekjan, Jan-Erik Ebbestad Hansen, Jan-Ove Tuv, and Dag Solhjell)

Kitsch painting is an international movement made up of classical painters, a result of a 24 September 1998 speech and philosophy given by the Norwegian figurative artist, Odd Nerdrum, later clarified in his book On Kitsch with Jan-Ove Tuv and others. The movement incorporates the techniques of the Old Masters with narrative, romanticism, and emotionally charged imagery. The movement defines Kitsch as synonymous with the arts of ancient Rome or the techne of ancient Greece. Kitsch painters embrace kitsch as a positive term not in opposition to "art", but as its own independent superstructure. Kitsch painters assert that Kitsch is not an art movement, but a philosophical movement separate from art. The Kitsch movement has been considered an indirect criticism of the contemporary art world, but according to Nerdrum, this is not the expressed intention.

== Origins of kitsch painting philosophy ==
The philosophy originated by Nerdrum first manifested into a group among Nerdrum's circle of students Jan-Ove Tuv, Helene Knoop, Hege Elizabeth Haugen, Monika Helgesen, Jeremy Caniglia, Kjetil Jul, Brad Silverstein, Carlos Madrid, Stefan Boulter, Brandon Kralik, Nanne Nyander, and soon expanded. Many kitsch painters were featured in and contributed essays to Nerdrum's book Kitsch: More than Art

== Collaborations ==
The Kitsch Movement has collaborated with The Florence Academy in a 2009 biennale exhibition titled "Immortal Works". a traveling exhibition which includes painters from around the world.

== Exhibitions ==
- 2002 Kitsch Katakomben, Haugar Vestfold KunstMuseum, Tonsberg, Norway
- 2002 Raugland Atelier, Stavern, Norway
- 2002 Larvik Kunstforening, Larvik, Norway
- 2004 Kitsch, Telemark Museum, Skien, Norway
- 2005 Kitsch Annuale, Krutthuset, Fredricksvern Verft, Stavern, Norway
- 2006 Kitsch Annuale, Stavern, Norway
- 2008 Kitsch Biennale Pasinger Fabrik, Munich, Germany
- 2009 Kitsch, Krapperup Castle, Sweden
- 2009 Fall Kitsch, Galleri PAN, Oslo, Norway
- 2009 Immortal Works, VASA KONSTHALL, Gothenburg, Sweden
- 2010 Kitsch Biennale, Palazzo Cini, Venice, Italy

== See also ==
- Aesthetics
- Classical Realism
- Empiricism
- Kitsch
- Metamodernism
- New Sincerity
- Objectivity (philosophy)
- Positivism
- Post-postmodernism
- Reconstructivism
- Stuckism
