= Twilight (painting) =

1981 painting by Odd Nerdrum

- Artist: Odd Nerdrum
- Year: 1981
- Medium: Oil on canvas
- Dimensions: 198 cm × 260 cm (78 in × 100 in)
- Location: Private collection

Twilight (Norwegian: Skumring) is a 1981 painting by the Norwegian artist Odd Nerdrum. It depicts a woman defecating in a forest clearing. Nerdrum presented the painting as a "tribute to the natural, the true human being whom we all fear".

== History and description ==
The painting was rejected by Høstutstillingen in 1981, along with all other submissions in a similar figurative style, which created media reactions in Norway. According to the jury president Per Kleiva, it was rejected solely because of a lack of technical accomplishment, and not because the subject was seen as controversial. It was instead exhibited at the gallery Blomqvist Kunsthandel, together with rejected paintings by other artists.

It was reviewed in Aftenposten, where the critic described it as shocking and unappetizing. Nerdrum replied: "I certainly don't mean to shock, but I don't want to conceal any part of reality."

Joseph Beuys, who had been Nerdrum's teacher at the Kunstakademie Düsseldorf, described Twilight as "possibly the most radical" painting he knew of. Twilight has been described as the start of a new course in Nerdrum's oeuvre, where he abandoned the political and social themes that had dominated his works in the 1970s.
