= Red Cloud (disambiguation) =

Red Cloud (1822–1909) was a war leader of the Oglala Lakota.

Red Cloud, Redcloud or RedCloud may also refer to:

== People ==
- Mitchell Red Cloud, Jr. (1924–1950), Native American United States Army corporal and Medal of Honor recipient
- Oliver Red Cloud (1919–2013), chief of the Oglala Sioux
- Elwood Towner, Native American attorney and Nazi sympathizer who performed anti-semitic speeches in the 1930s under the title Chief Red Cloud
- Red Cloud (rapper) (born 1978), American Christian hip hop musician

== Other uses ==
- Camp Red Cloud, a U.S. Army post in South Korea named after CPL Red Cloud
- Jake Red Cloud, a Red Cloud Comics superhero
- Red Cloud: Deliverance, movie based on comic book character Jake Red Cloud
- Red Cloud, Nebraska, a town in the United States
- Red Cloud Indians, minor league baseball teams from Red Cloud, Nebraska
- Redcloud Peak, mountain peak in U.S. state of Colorado
- USNS Red Cloud (T-AKR-313), a U.S. Navy vessel named after CPL Red Cloud

== See also ==
- Red Cloud Agency, Indian agency from 1871 to 1878
- Red Cloud High School (disambiguation)
- Maȟpíya Lúta (school) (formerly operating as Red Cloud Indian School), private Roman Catholic school in South Dakota established in 1888
- Red Cloud United States Post Office, historic site in Red Cloud, Nebraska
- Red Cloud's War, armed conflict in Wyoming and Montana territories from 1866 to 1868
- Red Thunder Cloud (1919–1996), the last native speaker of Catawba language
- Landscape with a Red Cloud, 1913 painting by Konrad Mägi
- Under the Red Cloud, studio album by Finnish metal band Amorphis
