= Haugesund Art Gallery =

Art museum in Haugesund, Norway

Coordinates: 59°25′7.53″N 5°15′48.91″E

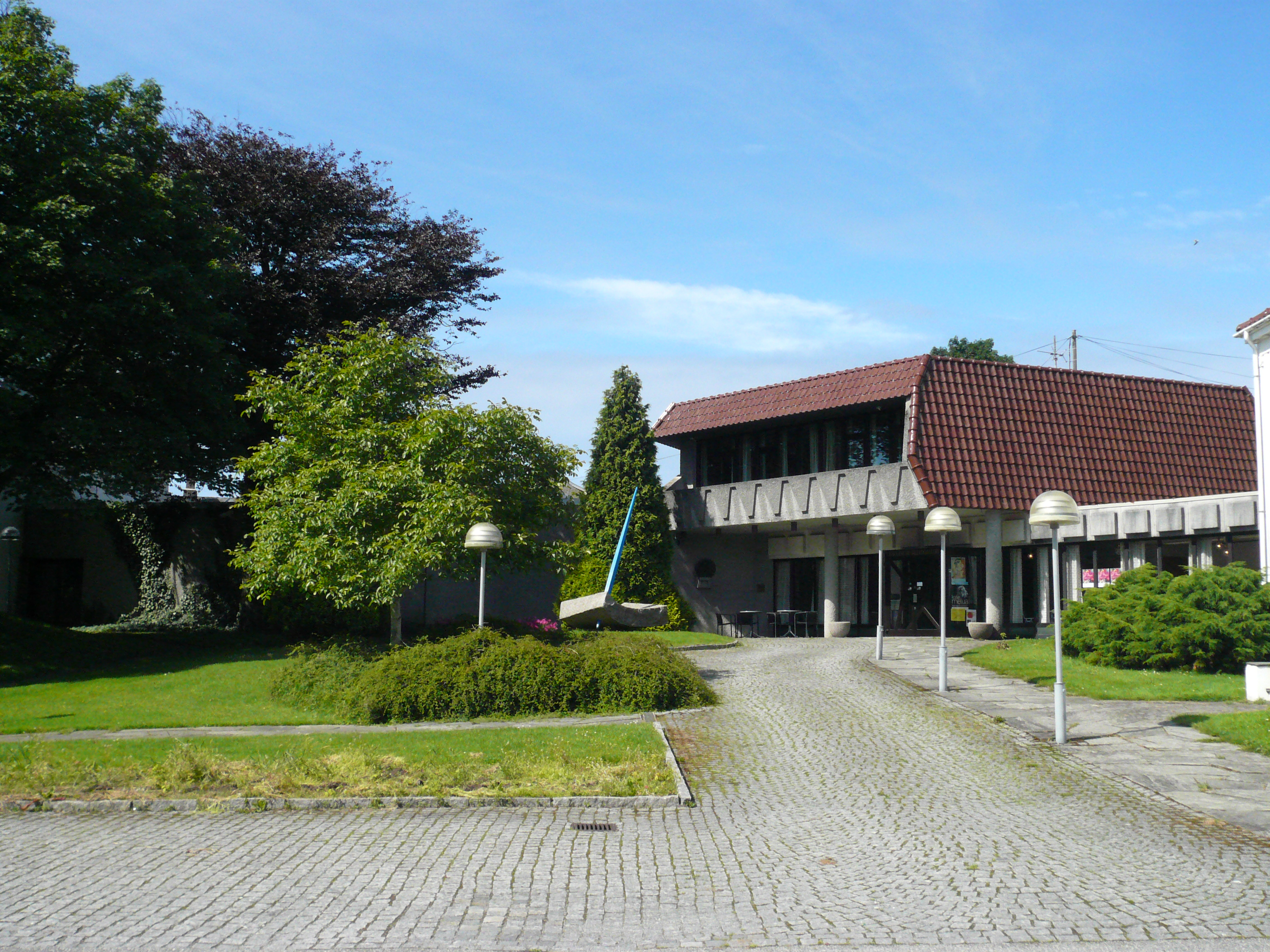
Haugesund Art Gallery, entrance

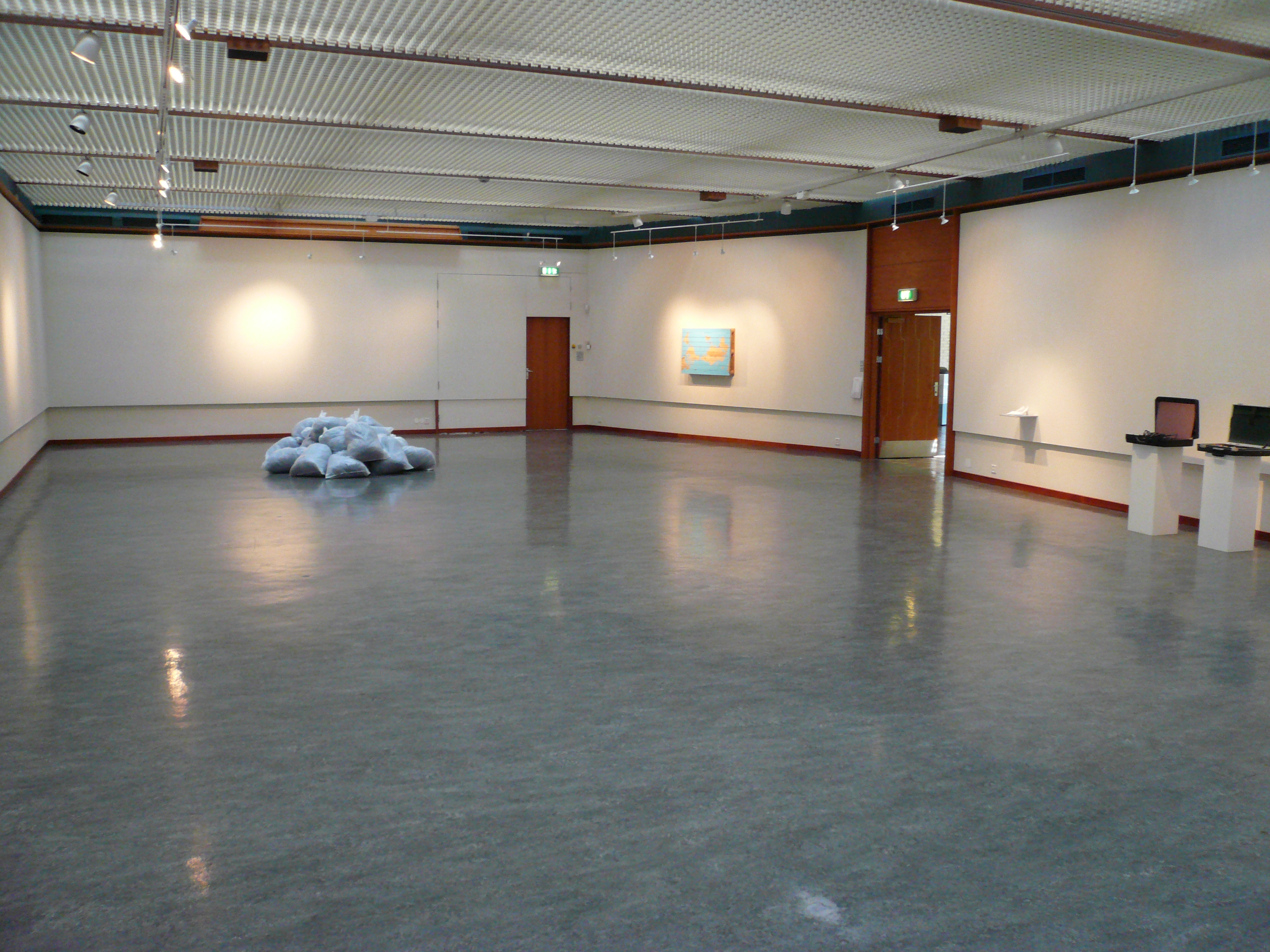
Haugesund Art Gallery, large hall

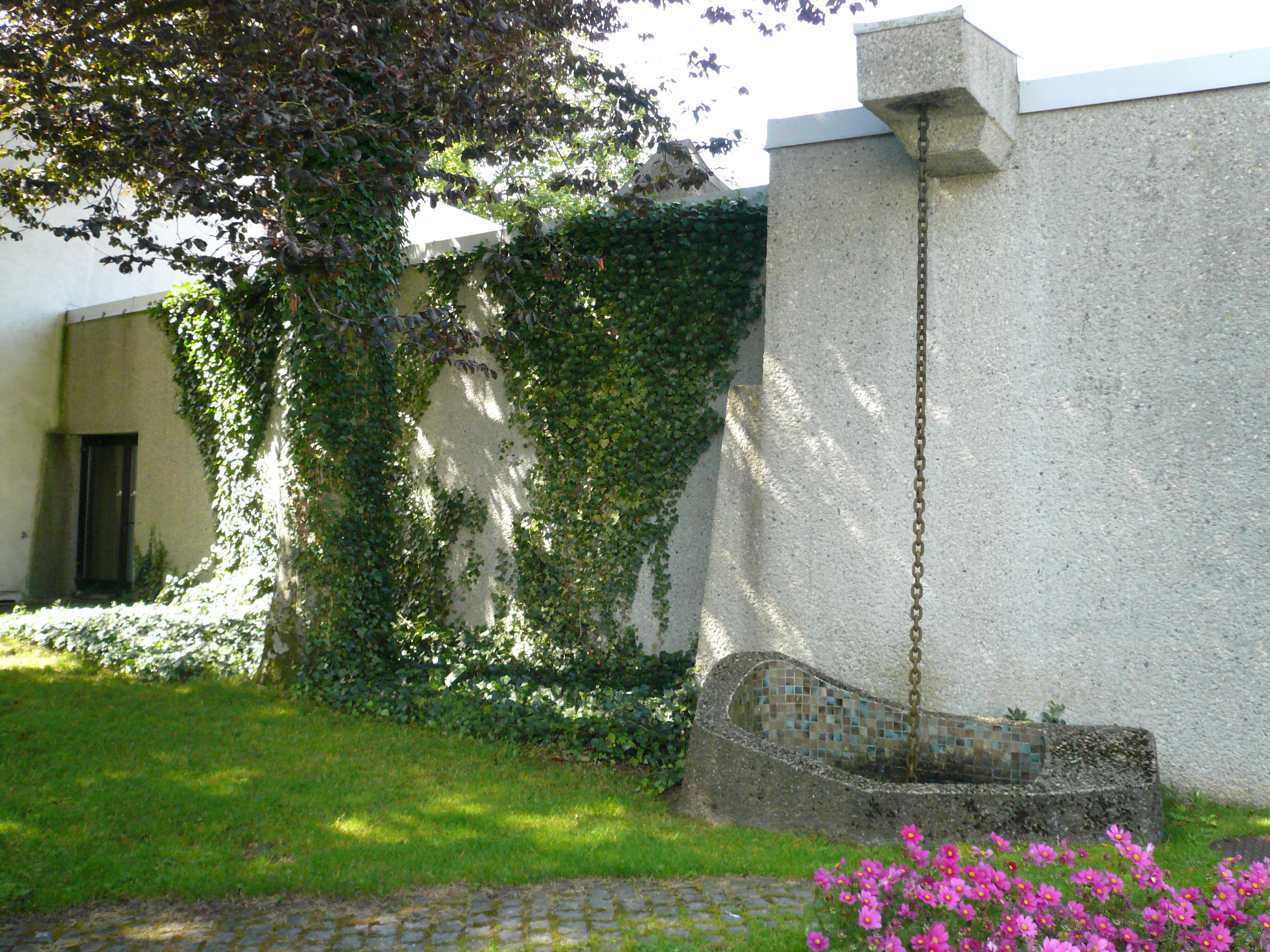
Architect David Sandved's exterior from 1978 with a lucam (hoist cover), chain, and well for roof drainage

The Haugesund Art Gallery (Norwegian: Haugesund Billedgalleri) stands in the north part of Haugesund with a view of the city park and rose garden. The art museum goes back to the Haugesund Art Society, founded in 1913. The Haugesund Art Gallery's museum was created as a municipal institution in 1973.

== Buildings ==
The museum was built in three stages: c. 1915, 1978, and 2004.

The oldest building was created as a residence for Lars and Inga Meling c. 1915. In 1952, the house and its appertaining property was willed to the Municipality of Haugesund as a gift in line with Lars and Inga Meling's last wishes. Since 1959, the Haugesund Art Society has used the Haugesund Art Gallery as an exhibition space. The main building, which dates from 1978, was designed by the architect David Sandved. The last extension was carried out in 2004 and was designed by the architectural bureau Sandved og Wathne Arkitekter AS.

The total building area covers 2,210 square meters (23,800 sq ft), of which the exhibition area covers 1,000 square meters (11,000 sq ft).

== Collections ==
The collections have their background in the Haugesund Art Society's permanent collection. In 1973 this was given to the Municipality of Haugesund in exchange for the municipality establishing a museum with display space for temporary exhibitions, a magazine, and a display room for the permanent collection.

Today the museum has an art collection that encompasses the works of Norwegian and international artists such as Lars Hertervig, Edvard Munch, Pablo Picasso, Christian Krohg, Per Kleiva, Håkon Bleken, and Inger Sitter.

The gallery has a collection that is rich in art connected to Western Norway, with works by artists such as Nikolai Astrup, Ole Frøvig, Trygve Goa, Kjell Pahr-Iversen, Fredrik Kolstø, Rita Marhaug, Olav Nygaard, Helene Nielsen, Stein-Magnus Opedal, Knut Rumohr, Gry Hege Rinaldo, Bernt Tunold, and Bjørn-Sigurd Tufta.

== Other ==
The Haugesund Art Society displays its current sales exhibitions in the gallery year round.
