= Ole Frøvig =

Norwegian painter

Ole Laurentius Frøvig (July 24, 1877 – August 10, 1951) was a Norwegian painter. He painted pictures in the naturalist style, often using themes from his home town of Haugesund. The Haugesund Art Gallery contains many paintings by Frøvig.

Frøvig was born in humble circumstances in Haugesund and grew up living on Strandgaten. His father, Jacob Danielsen Frøvig (1834–1894), was a brazier, a craftsman that makes ornaments from bronze and brass. His mother was Berthe Molene Apeland (1835–1919). Frøvig's parents were deeply religious, and this is also reflected in his paintings. Frøvig grew up together with an elder brother and two elder sisters. His brother Daniel Andreas Frøvig (1870–1954) was a parish priest who later became a professor of theology at the University of Oslo.

He received an artist education in Christiania at the Norwegian National Academy of Craft and Art Industry under Oscar Arnold Wergeland in 1898. He was then a student at the studio of Peder Severin Krøyer in Copenhagen. In 1904, Frøvig made his debut at the Høstutstillingen in Christiania. Frøvig was one of the founders of Haugesund Kunstforening in 1913. He was chairman of the association from 1927 to 1938. Frøvig painted the altarpieces in Torvastad Church (1914), Bokn Church (1925), and Tysvær Church (1938).
