= CDG-2 =

Dark galaxy in the Perseus cluster

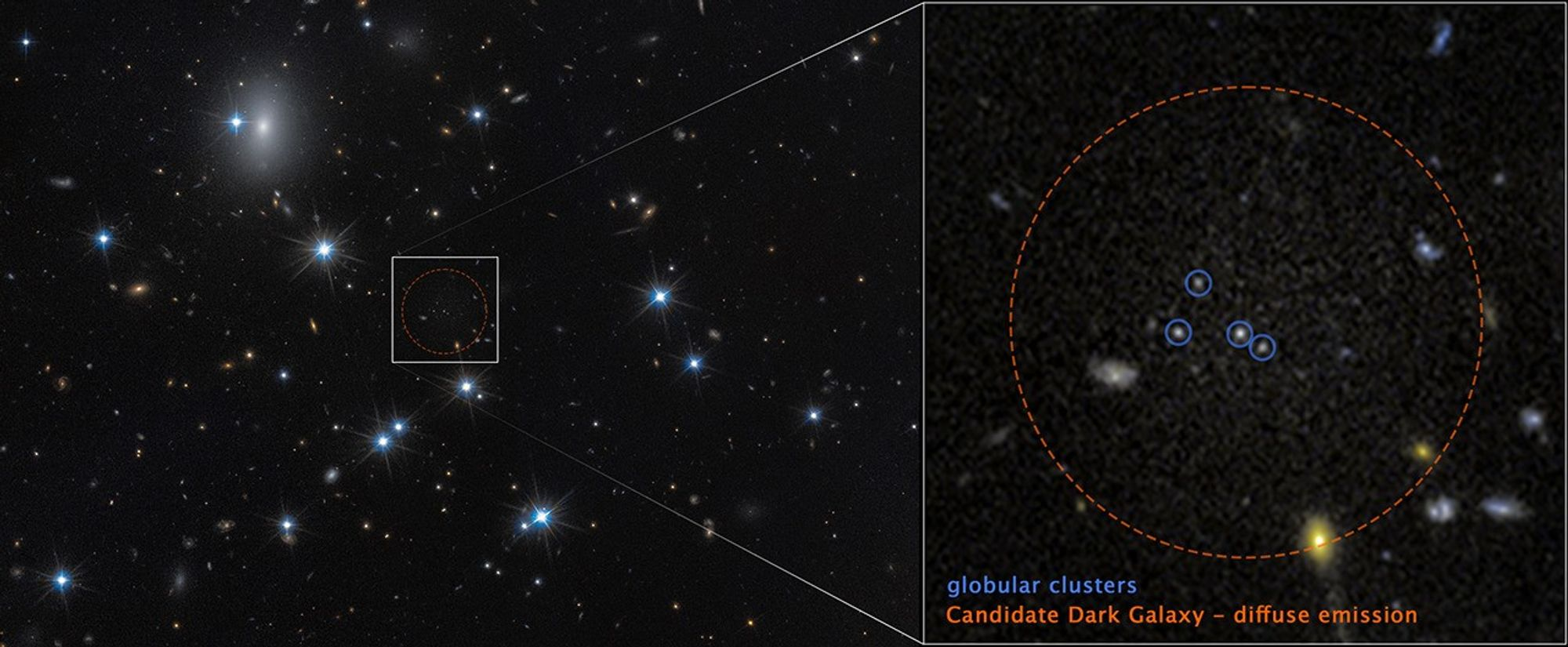
- Image of Candidate Dark Galaxy 2 (CDG-2) taken by Hubble Space Telescope, with the four globular clusters in it highlighted.

Observation data
- Constellation: Perseus
- Right ascension: 03^{h} 17^{m} 12.61^{s}
- Declination: +41° 20′ 52.64″
- Distance: c. 245 million ly
- Group or cluster: Perseus
- Notable features: Candidate for a dark galaxy
- References: https://science.nasa.gov/asset/hubble/dark-galaxy-cdg-2-near-perseus-cluster/

Candidate Dark Galaxy 2 (CDG-2) is a candidate for a dark galaxy, composed predominantly of dark matter, along with four globular clusters, in the Perseus cluster. It'd be one of the most dark matter dominated galaxies probably detected, estimated to be between 99.94% and 99.98% dark matter. It has been not confirmed yet if it's a true dark galaxy, more studies are required for a definitive conclusion.

== Discovery ==
CDG-2 was discovered by a Hubble Space Telescope survey (the PIPER survey) looking for larger than expected densities of globular clusters in the Perseus cluster. These higher densities of globular clusters could correspond to ultra-diffuse galaxies. In March 2025, researchers used a new statistical technique, a Poisson cluster process (adapted from the Neyman–Scott process), to perform the search and identified CDG-2 as a possible galaxy. In June 2025 the Hubble Space Telescope images, images from the Euclid survey, and images from the Subaru telescope were examined and diffuse emission around the globular clusters in CDG-2 was found, providing strong evidence that CDG-2 was indeed a galaxy. It is the first galaxy to be detected through the presence of globular clusters.

== Contents ==
Unlike most ultra-diffuse galaxies that have been discovered so far, CDG-2 is believed to only have the four globular clusters originally identified, though there were a few possible additional globular clusters that required further investigation. CDG-2 is estimated at having a dark matter halo mass of approximately $5.7 \times 10^{10} M_\odot$, meaning that it is a highly dark matter dominated galaxy, with a halo mass fraction of 99.94 to 99.98%. The existence of this galaxy may be a useful test for various theories of galaxy formation. Since dark galaxies are a prediction of the Lambda-CDM model, the prevalence of dark galaxies is an important test of the theory, and simulations of their prevalence have drawn upon CDG-2 as a reference, along with Cloud-9.

== See also ==
- Dark galaxy
- Dragonfly 44
- Cloud-9 (RELHIC)
- Dark matter
