= Reconstructivism =

Philosophical theory

Reconstructivism is a philosophical theory holding that societies should continually reform themselves in order to establish better governments or social networks. This theory involves recombining or recontextualizing the ideas arrived at by the philosophy of deconstruction, in which an existing system or medium is broken into its smallest meaningful elements and in which these elements are used to build a new system or medium free from the strictures of the original.

Some thinkers have attempted to ascribe the term Reconstructivism to the post-postmodern art movement. In an essay by Chris Sunami, ("Art Essays: Reconstructivist Art") "reconstructivist art" is described as follows:

A reconstructivist art work builds upon prior, deconstructionist artworks and techniques, but adapts them to classic themes and structures, with the goal of creating works of genuine emotion and significance. In this way, reconstructivism (when it works) combines the vitality and originality of deconstructionism with the comforts, pleasures and rewards of classicism. The overall purpose of reconstructivism is to reawaken a sense of the Real in a world where everything has been demonstrated to be an illusion.

One of the examples Sunami provides of this technique is the way some modern music incorporates deconstructed samples of older music and combines and arranges the samples in a new way as part of a new composition.

== See also ==
- The Kitsch Movement
- New Sincerity
- Metamodernism
- Post-postmodernism
- Reconstruction (disambiguation)
