= The Clouds (Manchester band) =

English indie rock band

The Clouds were an indie rock band signed to Chris and Julia Nagle's 'Wobble Records'. They are from Manchester. They recorded a John Peel session in 1991 and appeared live on Mark Radcliffe's 'Hit the North' BBC Radio 5 show in the same year. The band received some regional and national radio airplay and appeared live as a support act with Sheffield band World of Twist (1991), Intastella (1991) and indie pop and alternative dance band Flowered Up (1991) as well as in their own right at venues in the North West. For the duration of the time they were signed to Wobble Records, the band were made up of:

- Simon Dickinson (Lead Vocal / Guitar)
- Simon Maguire (Guitar)
- Timothy Jones (Bass Guitar)
- Dave Drennan (Keyboards)
- Simon Moss (Percussion)

== Early years ==
The band was formed after the three remaining members of the 'Dillen Experience' Tim Jones, Simon Moss and Simon Dickinson were joined by ex-Dillen Experience, 'Rig' and 'Resonance' keyboard player Dave Drennan. They were joined by Simon Maguire (previously in Sale band 'The Sewage') shortly afterwards. They signed to Wobble Records following regular plays of a demo featuring "Moon Llama" to clients and staff at Strawberry Studios where Dave Drennan was employed. Three of the group were called Simon, which led to an array of obligatory pseudonyms, including Vincent Van Void, Sonic Windpipe, Balloon, Doctor Kecks, Bruce Starbuck, The Beast and Jimmy Goggles.

== Releases ==
Two EPs were released on Wobble Records — "Moon Llama" and the follow-up "Bingo Clubs Millennium Ball"

EP Title	Track names	Year of release	Label	Producer/Engineer
"Moon Llama"	"Moon Llama"	1991	Wobble	John Pennington
	"Snowman"	1991	Wobble	Chris Nagle
	"Set Free to Be"	1991	Wobble	John Pennington
	"Moon Llama Too"	1991	Wobble	John Pennington
"Bingo Club's Millennium Ball"	"Dude Electric Cell"	1992	Wobble	John Pennington
	"King of the Rocket Men"	1992	Wobble	John Pennington
	"Jungle Mooncake Rocket Man"	1992	Wobble	John Pennington
	"Blue Cat"	1992	Wobble	John Pennington

The band also recorded tracks for an album that was never released — "Poll Tax Blues", "Druids Sacrifice of the Autumnal Equinox", "Osmosis", and "Touch of the Sun".

Courtesy of Wobble Records, vocalist and guitarist Simon Dickinson also played guitar and sang on the Mighty Force track "Playbeast" which featured on their 1992 album, Hypnovel.

The "Moon Llama EP" was recorded in down time at Strawberry Studios in Stockport. "Bingo Clubs Millennium Ball EP" was recorded at Courtyard Studios in Stockport.

The band stopped playing live and recording in 1992. They got together again circa 1997 for a one-off show at the Roadhouse in Manchester. This line-up did not feature rhythm guitarist Simon Maguire or keyboard player Dave Drennan, but did include Eldon Snelgrove (real name) on percussion and keyboards. They then re-formed briefly in 2012, playing four shows; at the North London Tavern (Kilburn, London), Power's Bar (Kilburn, London), Affstock (Chelmsford) and the Ruby Lounge (Manchester). The only absentee from the 2012 line-up was Simon Maguire.

== Current activity ==
Following the demise of the Clouds, Simon Dickinson went on to form Buzzwagon with bass player Tim Jones and ex 'This Years Blonde' drummer Eldon Snelgrove, re-recording The Clouds' "Touch of the Sun". Simon Dickinson now writes and records as Hamfist and collaborates with drummer Simon Moss who records in his own right as Sonic Windpipe.
