= St. Cloud =

St. Cloud or Saint Cloud may refer to:

- Clodoald, known as Saint Cloud, a Christian saint, son of the Frankish king Chlodomer

== Music ==
- Saint Cloud (album), a 2020 album by Waxahatchee

== Places ==
=== Australia ===
- St. Cloud, Burwood, an historic home in Sydney, New South Wales

=== France ===
- Saint-Cloud, a town in Paris's western suburbs
  - Château de Saint-Cloud, a royal château or palace near Saint-Cloud
  - Saint-Cloud Racecourse, a venue for horse racing in Saint-Cloud

=== United States ===
- St. Cloud, Florida
- St. Cloud, Minnesota
  - St. Cloud State University
- St. Cloud, Missouri
- St. Cloud, Ray County, Missouri
- Saint Cloud, West Virginia
- St. Cloud, Wisconsin

== See also ==
- Convention of Saint-Cloud, military convention of 1815
- Ordinances of Saint-Cloud, a series of July 1830 decrees by French King Charles X
