= Shooting reconstruction =

Shooting incident reconstruction is the examination of the physical evidence recovered or documented at the scene of a shooting. Shooting reconstruction may also include the laboratory analysis of the evidence recovered at the scene. The goal is an attempt to gain an understanding of what may or may not have happened during the incident. Once all reasonable explanations have been considered, one can evaluate the significance of witness or suspect accounts of the incident.

In many cases valuable evidence necessary for reconstruction analysis exists at the crime scene. Should this evidence go undocumented or unrecovered during the initial processing of the shooting scene, the information it can give investigators may be lost forever. Poor shooting incident processing can not be compensated for by excellent laboratory work.

There are many questions that can be answered from the proper reconstruction of a shooting incident. Some of the questions typically answered by a shooting reconstruction investigation include (but not limited to) the distance of the shooter from the target, The path of the bullet(s), The number of shots fired and possibly the sequence of multiple discharges at a shooting incident.

The Association of Firearm and Tool Mark Examiners is an international non-profit organization dedicated to the advancement of firearm and tool mark identification, including shooting reconstruction.
