= Cloud-9 (RELHIC) =

Reionization-Limited HI Cloud near to the spiral galaxy M94

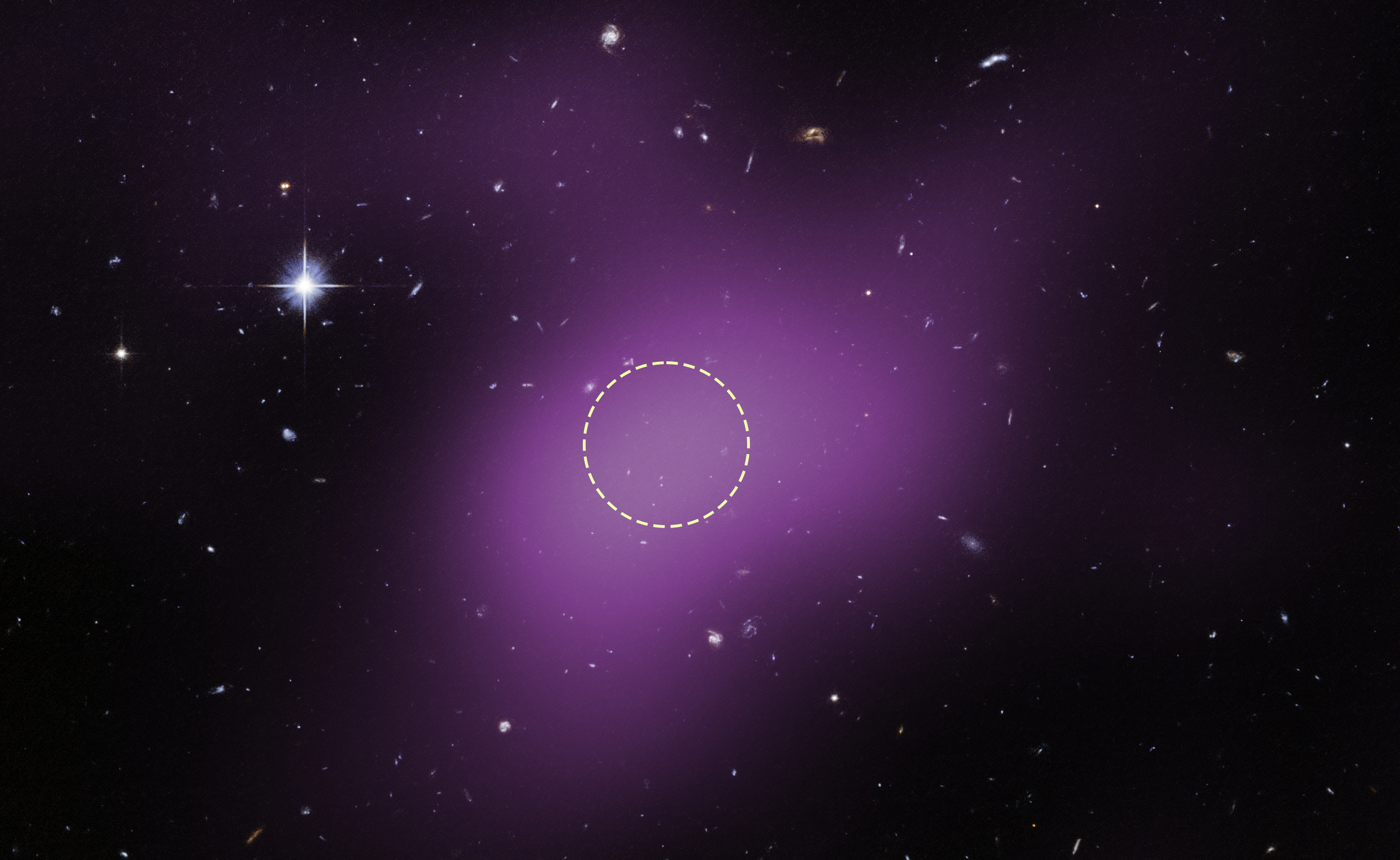
- Image of region around Cloud-9 from Hubble Space Telescope's advanced camera system, overlaid with radio emission data from the Very Large Array, which shows the extent of the cloud in magenta. The circle shows the central region searched for stars

Observation data (J2000 epoch)
- Constellation: Ursa Major
- Right ascension: 12^{h} 51^{m} 51.33^{s}
- Declination: +40° 18′ 05.46″
- Distance: 14 Mly

Characteristics
- Type: RELHIC

Other designations
- Cloud-9

Cloud-9 is a Reionization-Limited HI Cloud (RELHIC), and possibly a starless dark matter galaxy. This RELHIC may have a total mass of 5 billion times that of the Sun and was found in the vicinity of the spiral galaxy Messier 94 (M94), in the constellation Canes Venatici.

== Discovery ==
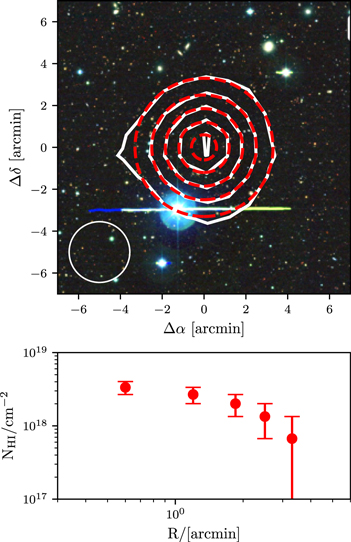
CL-9's observed column density isocontours (taken from Z23)

Cloud-9 was initially detected as a compact H I cloud during radio observations with Five-hundred-meter Aperture Spherical Telescope (FAST) in 2023 as part of a survey of the northern sky and confirmed by NASA's Hubble Space Telescope in early 2026, Cloud-9 is the first confirmed example of a failed galaxy of a type predicted by the Lambda CDM cold dark matter cosmological model, having captured hydrogen gas but failed to initiate star formation. It was catalogued as the ninth such cloud identified on the outskirts of the nearby spiral galaxy M94, leading to its name. Independent confirmation of the H I detection came from follow-up observations with the Very Large Array (VLA) and the Robert C. Byrd Green Bank Telescope (GBT).

== See also ==
- CDG-2
