= Abner Cloud House =

Historic house in Delaware, United States

- U.S. National Register of Historic Places
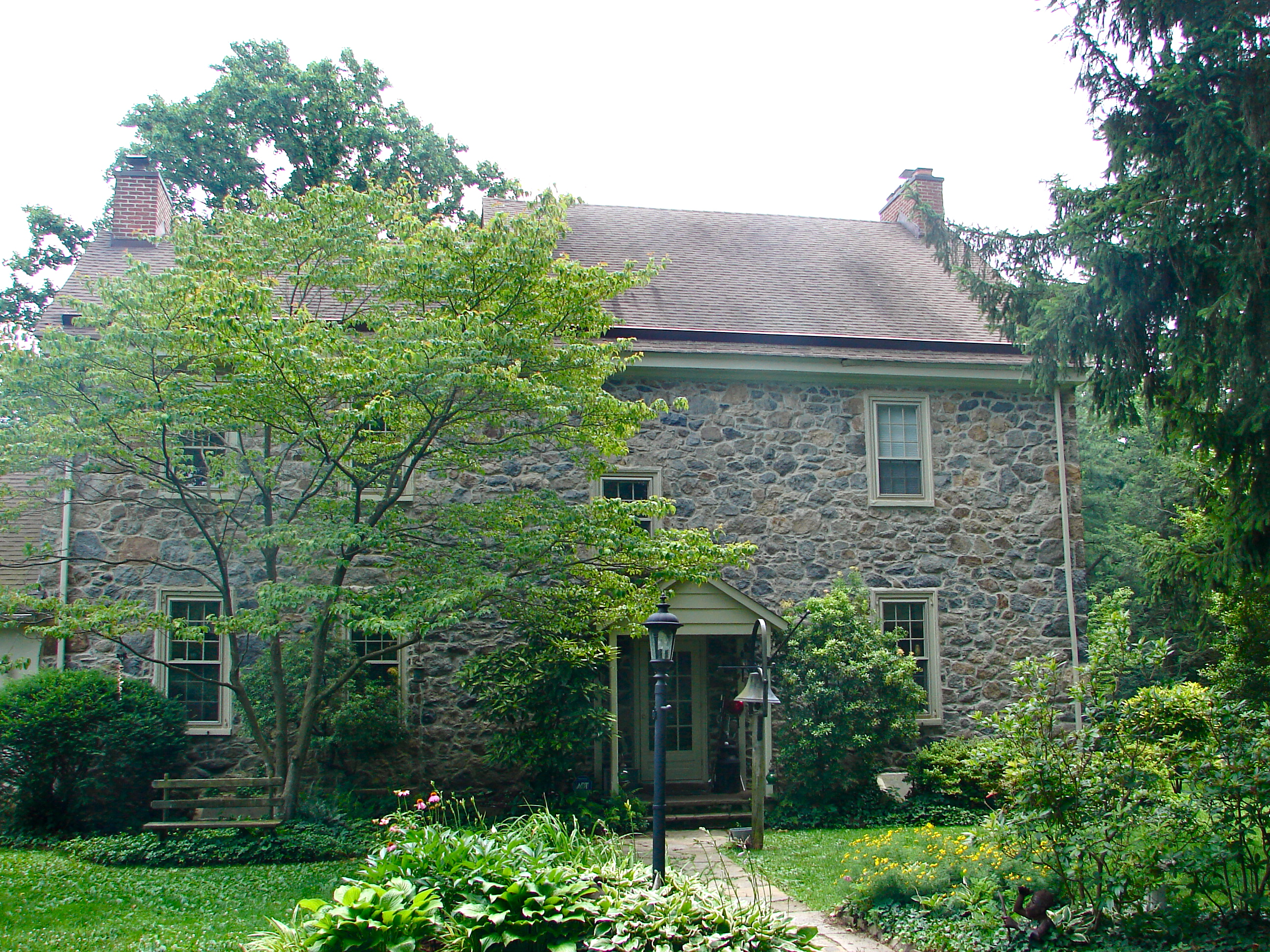
- Abner Cloud House, June 2011

- Location within Delaware Location within the United States
- Location: 14 Ravine Rd., Brandywine Hundred, near Wilmington, Delaware
- Coordinates: 39.814938°N 75.479831°W
- Area: 2.3 acres (0.93 ha)
- Built: 1822
- Architectural style: Federal, Vernacular Federal
- NRHP reference No.: 92001144
- Added to NRHP: August 31, 1992

Abner Cloud House, also known as Sawmill Farm, Mansion Farm, and the John S. Petitdemange House, is a historic home located near Wilmington, New Castle County, Delaware. It was built about 1822, and consists of a two-story, side-gable, double-pile main section, a two-story, gable-roof, original kitchen wing; and a one-story, 20th century modern kitchen wing. It is constructed of stone and is in a vernacular Federal style. Also on the property is a 1 1/2-story gable-roof, frame and stone outbuilding.

It was added to the National Register of Historic Places in 1992.
