= Cloud-Reese House =

Historic house in Delaware, United States

- U.S. National Register of Historic Places
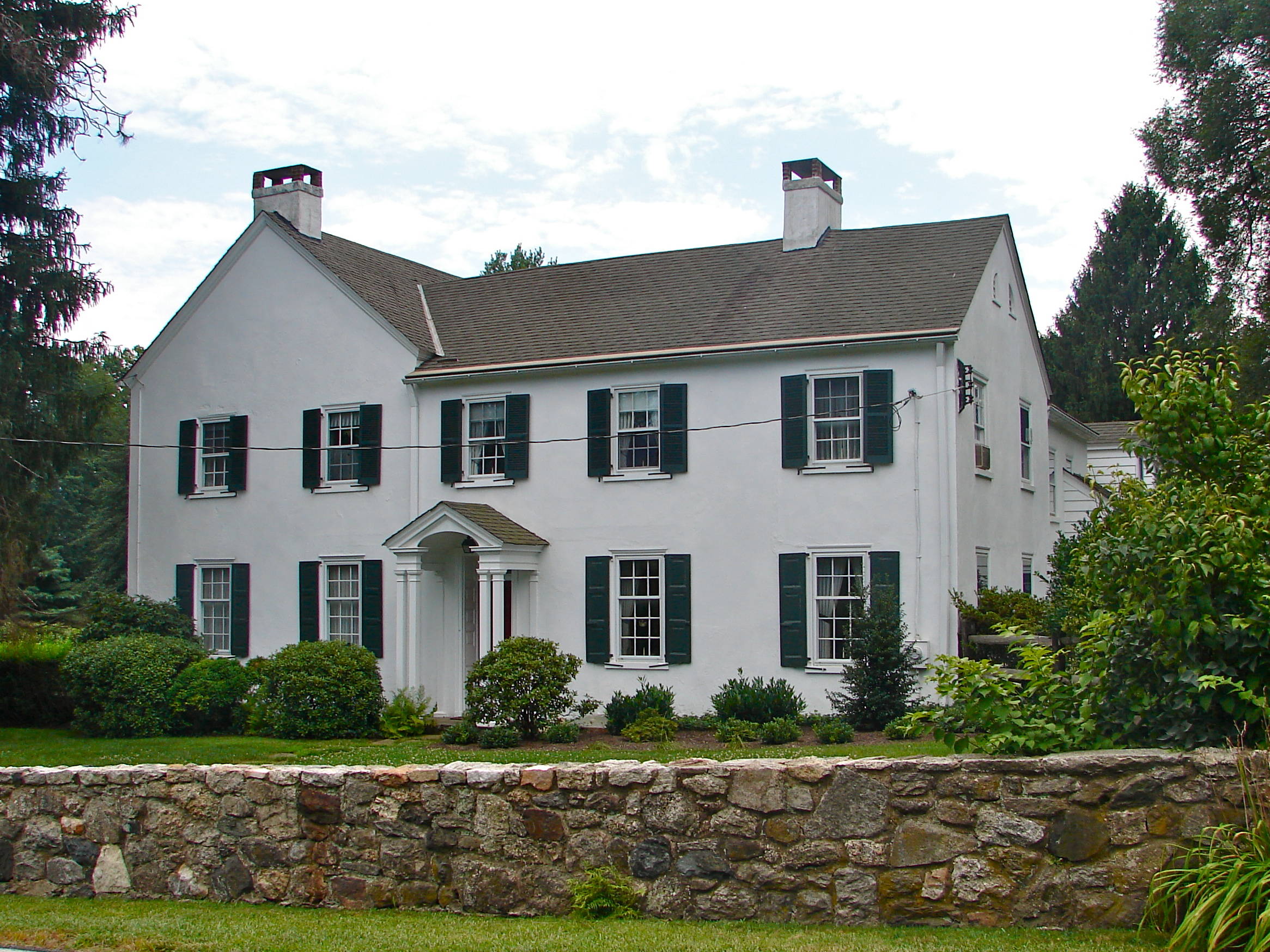
- Cloud-Reese House, July 2011

- Location within Delaware Location within the United States
- Location: 2202 Old Kennett Rd., near Wilmington, Delaware
- Coordinates: 39.822168°N 75.657008°W
- Area: 4.4 acres (1.8 ha)
- Built: 1929 (with earlier portions from c. 1770 and c. 1820)
- Architect: Wilson, L. Waring Wilson
- Architectural style: Colonial Revival
- NRHP reference No.: 01000885
- Added to NRHP: August 17, 2001

Cloud-Reese House is a historic home located near Wilmington, New Castle County, Delaware. The original was built about 1770, and forms the rear wing. The main section dates to about 1820, and is a three-bay, two-story, stuccoed stone dwelling. In 1929, the house was renovated in the Colonial Revival style. This included the addition of a wing was added with a kitchen, pantry, laundry, three-car garage, and servants' quarters. Also on the property is a contributing low stone wall.

It was added to the National Register of Historic Places in 2001.
