= Red Cloud High School =

Red Cloud High School may refer to:

- Red Cloud High School (Nebraska) in Red Cloud, Nebraska
- Red Cloud High School (South Dakota) in Pine Ridge, South Dakota
