= The Cloud (painting) =

1985 painting by Odd Nerdrum

- Artist: Odd Nerdrum
- Year: 1985
- Medium: Oil on canvas
- Dimensions: 123 cm × 139 cm (48 in × 55 in)
- Location: Private collection

The Cloud (Norwegian: Skyen) is an oil painting by the Norwegian artist Odd Nerdrum, from 1985. It depicts a nude man in a leather helmet, looking out over a landscape with a compact dark cloud in the sky. It is held in a private collection.

In 2005 the painting was selected by the newspaper Morgenbladet as one of Norway's twelve most important artworks from the period 1945–2005.

A version of the painting was sold for 1.9 million Norwegian kroner in 2008, which was the new record for a Nerdrum painting. The record was held until 2016 when Dawn was sold for £341,000 British.

== Status ==
The original version is severely damaged because it was painted with an oil mix that turned out to be sensitive to heat. The damaged painting was shown as part of Nerdrum's 2011 tax case, when the Norwegian tax agency deemed that Nerdrum had evaded taxes during the years 1997–2002 by hiding earnings in an Austrian safe deposit box. Nerdrum's defence said that the money was kept so it could be repaid to buyers of potentially damaged paintings from the same period as The Cloud, and that the secrecy was maintained to avoid a general devaluation of Nerdrum's art.
