= Clouds (sculpture) =

Clouds (Harvard Circle Fountain)
- Artist: Hans Van de Bovenkamp
- Year: 2000
- Medium: Stainless steel sculpture incorporating fountain
- Dimensions: 7.6 m (25 ft); 9.1 m diameter (30 ft)
- Location: Toledo, Ohio, U.S.
- 41.612250°N 83.586694°W

Clouds is a 2000 stainless steel abstract sculpture by Hans Van de Bovenkamp, installed in Toledo's Harvard Terrace, in the U.S. state of Ohio. Each cloud sculpture includes a downward-firing fountain ring simulating rain illuminated by multicolored lighting. The artwork incorporating 3 clouds measures approximately 25 ft high by 30 ft in diameter. It's the centerpiece of a traffic circle named the Harvard Circle Fountain at the junction of Harvard Blvd, Broadway St, Glendale Ave and River Rd.
