= Haugesund Mekaniske Verksted =

Haugesund Mekaniske Verksted (HMV) was founded in 1900 as a shipyard in the city centre of Haugesund. The shipyard was moved to the western side of Risøy in 1912. From around 1970 the business has been towards the offshore market, with the construction of modules, maintenance of ships and oil and gas offshore installations.

Haugesund Mekaniske Verksted is the city's biggest employer and is owned by the service company Aibel.

== Ships ==
Incomplete list

Number	Delivered	Name	Type	Tonnage	Shipowners	Harbor	Status
7	1955	MT Birk	Tanker	498 brt	A/S Rederiet Odfjell	Bergen	Shipwrecked in 1974
