= Cloud9 (service provider) =

Cloud9 Mobile
- Industry: Telecommunications
- Headquarters: Basingstoke, United Kingdom
- Parent: Wireless Logic Ltd
- Website: www.cloud9mobile.co.uk

Cloud9 is a mobile network operator focussed on providing mobile subscriptions over the air to programmable SIM cards, SoftSIMs and eSIMs. Their service is used in both smartphones and IoT devices. The company is privately held with headquarters in the United Kingdom.

== History ==
Cloud9, originally owned by Wire9 Telecom Plc, funded and established by investor and telecom specialist, Lee Jones, before being sold for an undisclosed sum by Jones to billionaire Romain Zaleski. It established in the UK, Gibraltar, and Isle of Man as a domestic Mobile Network Operator. Cloud9 obtained spectrum licenses in the Isle of Man in 2007 and Gibraltar in 2010. Around 2011, Cloud9 decided to focus on supplying global SIM cards to save roaming charges. The Gibraltar spectrum licence was sold to another company. The business relocated its core network to Telehouse in London and became a subsidiary of BlueMango Technologies Ltd. Later the company was acquired by Wireless Logic Ltd.

In 2013, Cloud9 acquired the IPR of Zynetix Ltd. Through this acquisition, the company achieved sales as an MVNE.

In 2014, the company was voted as a Red Herring Top 100 Europe finalist.

== Features ==
Cloud9 has shipped several million 'Travel SIMs'; all SIM cards have been branded with the logo of these resellers. Additionally, the company provides the digital signatures ('profiles' or 'IMSIs') that provide a SIM card with the ability to register with a network and function. These can be provisioned over the air to dynamic SIM cards such as programmable removable UICCs, SoftSIMs and eSIMs. They are members of the GSM Association and are involved in the GSMA remote SIM provisioning standard for eSIMs that will be released soon. The Cloud9 core network also supports 4G (HSS/PDG).

Its Mobile Country Code is 234 and its Mobile Network Code is 18. TADIG code is GBRC9.

The company has been allocated the following UK number ranges by Ofcom:

- 4478722, 4477000, 4474409, 4479782, 4479783 and 4475588

The core network is hosted on Cloud9 servers at Telehouse near Canary Wharf in London. Additional components are hosted in Amazon Web Services facilities around the world in order to minimise latency and provide scalability.
