= NGC 7609 =

Galaxy in the constellation Pegasus

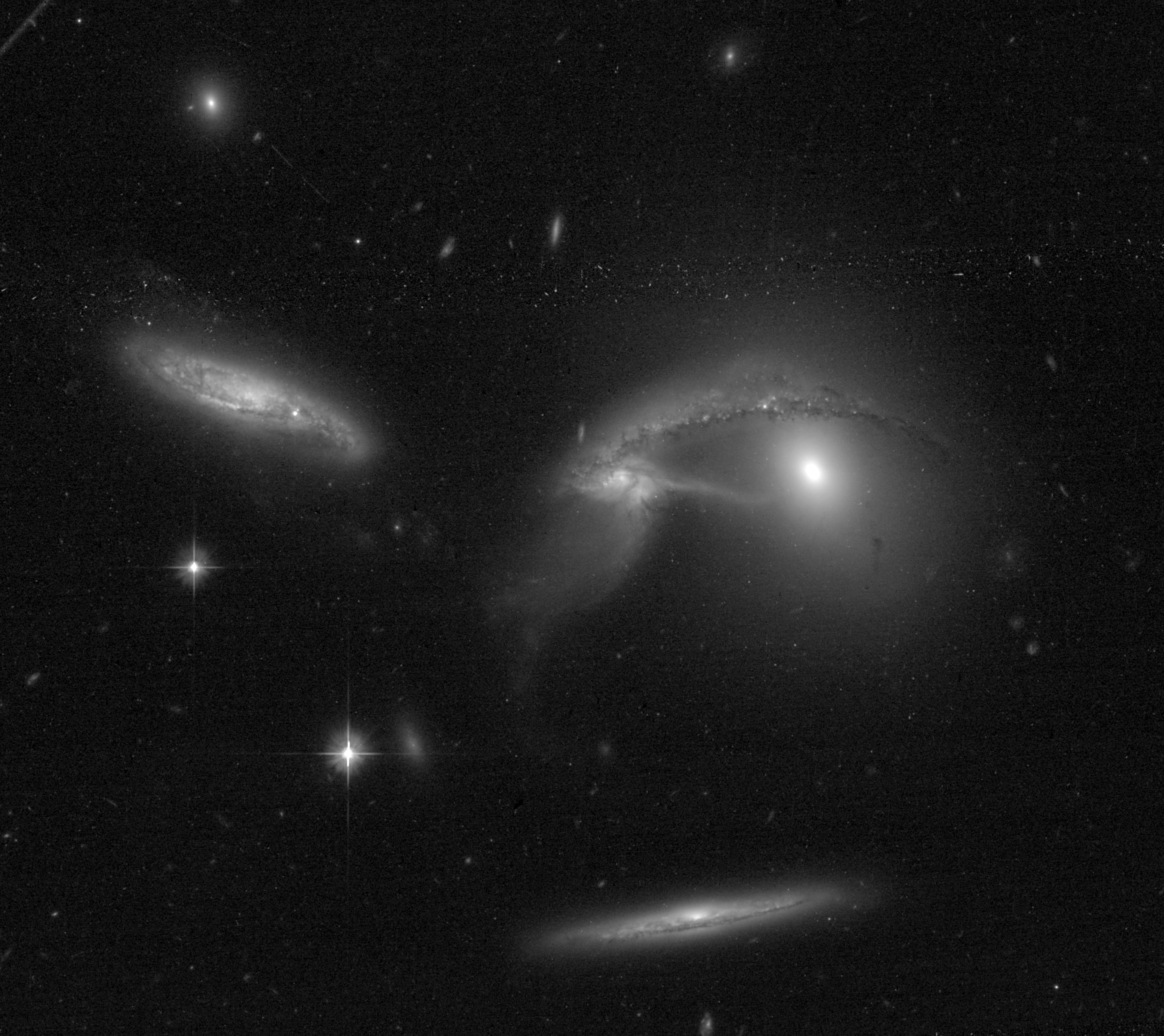
- Hubble Space Telescope image of NGC 7609, the brightest galaxy located right

Observation data (J2000 epoch)
- Constellation: Pegasus
- Right ascension: 23^{h} 19^{m} 30.0417^{s}
- Declination: +09° 30′ 29.922″
- Redshift: 0.039624
- Heliocentric radial velocity: 11,879 km/s
- Distance: 554 Mly (170 Mpc)
- Group or cluster: Hickson 95
- Apparent magnitude (V): 15.23

Characteristics
- Type: E3, E
- Size: 207,000 ly
- Notable features: Interacting galaxy

Other designations
- 2MASX J23193006+0930295, PGC 71076, HCG 095A, SDSS J231930.07+093029.8, VV 20a, CGCG 406-065, MCG +01-59-047, ARP 150, NSA 151130, WISEA J231930.04+093029.9, V1CG 625 NED01

NGC 7609 or known as Arp 150 and HCG 95A, is a large elliptical galaxy located in Pegasus. Its speed relative to the cosmic microwave background is 11,879 km/s, which corresponds the galaxy to be located 554 million light-years away from Earth (169.7 Mpc). NGC 7609 was discovered on October 5, 1864, by Albert Marth and included in Halton Arp's, Atlas of Peculiar Galaxies in galaxies that produces jets.

With a surface brightness of apparent magnitude 14.59, NGC 7609 is classified as a low surface brightness galaxy (LSB). LSB galaxies are diffuse galaxies with surface brightness that is one less magnitude, of the night sky.

== A pair of interacting galaxies ==
A SDSS survey image and from the Hubble Space Telescope, showed that NGC 7609 is interacting with nearby galaxy, PGC 71077 (HCG 95C) whose spiral arms is currently being absorbed by the larger entity. A double-nuclei is present in HCG 95C, which is considered a merger remanent of two disk galaxies. Two tidal tails are also found in NGC 7609 and HCG 95C region, which seems to connect together, and there is a linear bridge between two galaxies indicating nuclear activity is taking place in HCG 95C. From the study written from Vilchez & Iglesias-Paramo in 1998, Hα emission is detected in the nuclei of both galaxies and also the larger tidal tails (the eastern tail).

A long slit spectra of NGC 7609 shows, it exhibits red-shifted H-alpha +[N II] and [S II] emission lines that is indicative to a LINER-type AGN (Active Galactic Nucleus).

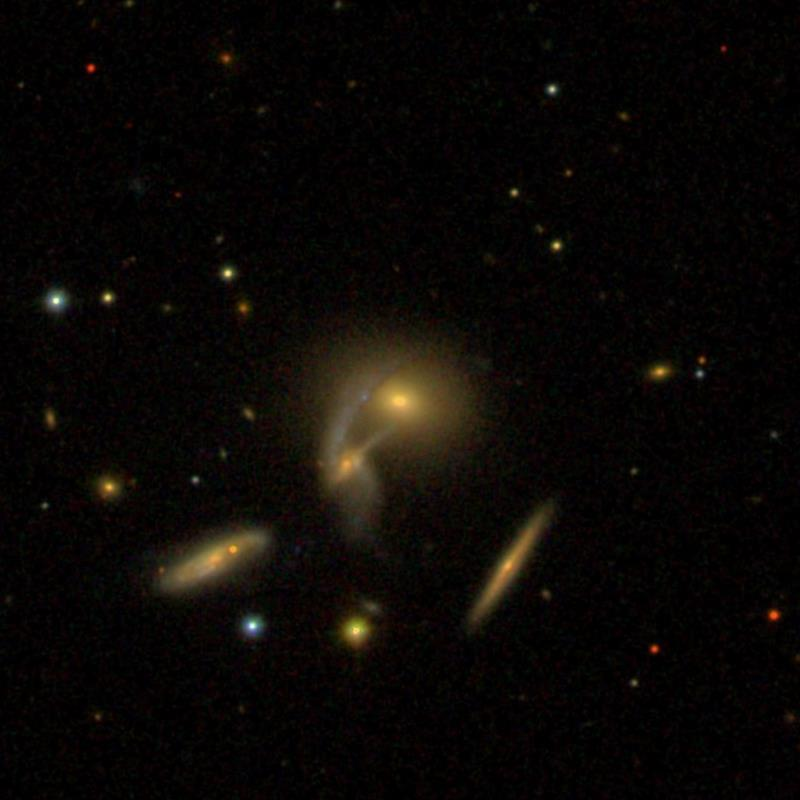
Sloan Digital Sky Survey of NGC 7609

From the spatial profiles, this indicates non-nuclear starburst activity triggered by tidal forces while nuclear spectrum indicates non thermal activity. From the further IUE observations of HCG 95C, it presents a featureless continuum with transient outburst captured in one observation, showing galactic emission of red-shifted N v (1240 A) and C IV (1550 A). This result depicts HCG 95C is in the early stages of merging with NGC 7609.

According to another study, it is suggested that a dwarf galaxy might have been created at the tip of the northern tidal tails.

== Hickson 95 group ==
NGC 7609 is a member of Hickson Compact Group 95. There are total of four galaxies in the group, in which the members are PGC 71074, PGC 71077 and PGC 71080. Of all the four galaxies, PGC 71080 (HCG 95B) is a foreground galaxy, as its line-of-sight velocity of 8000 km/s significantly differs from the velocity of the other members per published by Hickson et al.

== Presence of ultra-diffuse galaxies around HCG 95 ==
A study mentions there is a detection of 89 candidate ultra-diffuse galaxies (UDGs), around NGC 7609 and HCG 95, in which one is linked with. It is a gas-rich galaxy with H i mass 1.1 x 10 M⊙, detected by Very Large Array, and has a stellar mass of M 1.8 x 10 M⊙. This indicates that UDGs partially overlap with population of nearly dark galaxies found in deep H I surveys. The results show high abundance of blue UDGs in the HCG 95 field is favored by the poor galaxy cluster environment residing in H I-rich large-scale structures.

== Supernova ==
One supernova has been observed in NGC 7609. SN 1973M (type unknown, mag. 19) was discovered by Charles Kowal on 8 June 1973.
