= HVC 127-41-330 =

High-velocity cloud

Interstellar cloud
- High-velocity cloud

Observation data: J2000.0 epoch
- Right ascension: 01^{h} 05^{m}
- Declination: +21.8°
- Distance: 2,300,000 ly (700,000 pc)
- Designations: HVC 127-41-331, HVC 128-41-329, HVC 127-42-352, HVC 127-41-330

HVC 127-41-330 is a high-velocity cloud in the constellation of Pisces. The three numbers that compose its name indicate, respectively, the galactic longitude and latitude, and velocity towards Earth in km/s. It is 20,000 light years in diameter and is located 2.3 million light years (700 kiloparsecs) from Earth, between M31 and M33. This cloud of neutral hydrogen (detectable via 21 cm H-I emissions), unlike other HVCs shows a rotational component and dark matter. 80% of the mass of the cloud is dark matter. It is also the first HVC discovered not associated with the Milky Way galaxy or subgroup (subcluster).

Astronomer Josh Simon considers it a candidate for being a dark galaxy. With its rotation, it may be a very low density dwarf galaxy of unused hydrogen (no stars), a remnant of the formation of the Local Group.

== See also ==
- Dark galaxy
- VIRGOHI21
- LSB galaxy
