= NGC 4267 =

Galaxy in the constellation Virgo

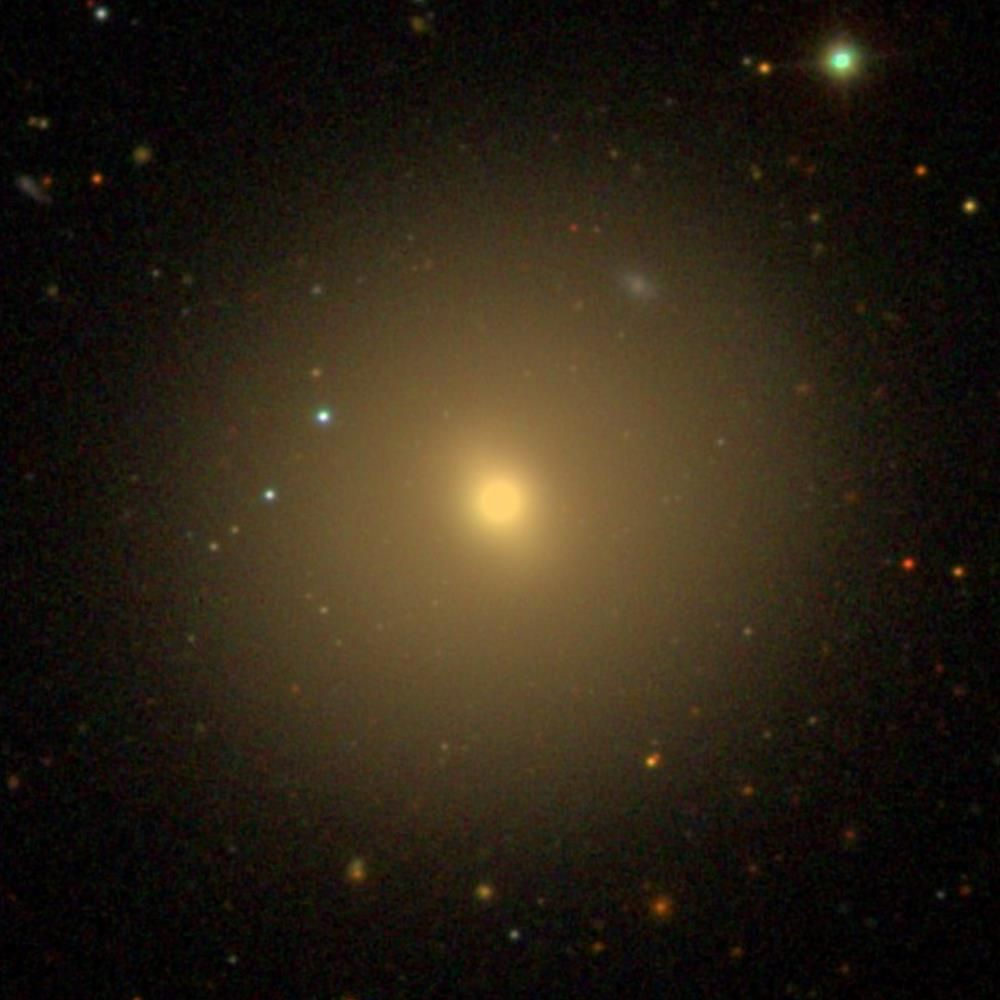
- SDSS image of NGC 4267.

Observation data (J2000 epoch)
- Constellation: Virgo
- Right ascension: 12^{h} 19^{m} 45.2^{s}
- Declination: 12° 47′ 54″
- Redshift: 0.003406
- Heliocentric radial velocity: 1021 km/s
- Distance: 55 Mly (17 Mpc)
- Group or cluster: Virgo Cluster
- Apparent magnitude (V): 11.86

Characteristics
- Type: SB0^-(s)?
- Size: ~58,000 ly (17.7 kpc) (estimated)
- Apparent size (V): 3.2 x 3.0

Other designations
- CGCG 70-13, MCG 2-32-4, PGC 39710, UGC 7373, VCC 369

NGC 4267 is a barred lenticular galaxy located about 55 million light-years away in the constellation Virgo. It was discovered by astronomer William Herschel on April 17, 1784 and is a member of the Virgo Cluster.

== See also ==
- List of NGC objects (4001–5000)
- NGC 4262
- NGC 4340
- NGC 4477
