= NGC 828 =

Galaxy in the constellation Andromeda

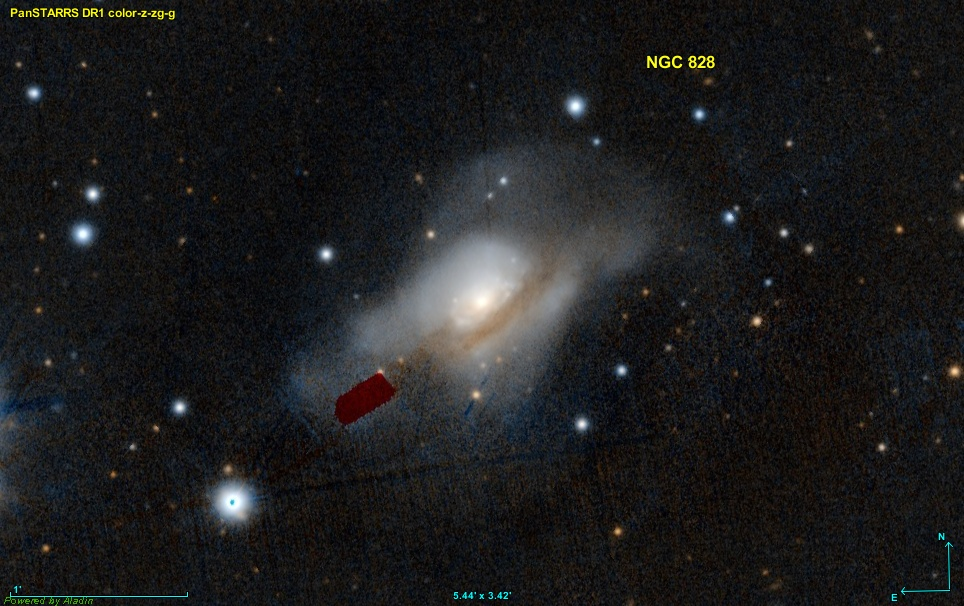
- NGC 828 imaged by Pan-STARRS

Observation data (J2000 epoch)
- Constellation: Andromeda
- Right ascension: 02^{h} 10^{m} 09.5476^{s}
- Declination: +39° 11′ 24.925″
- Redshift: 0.017846
- Heliocentric radial velocity: 5350 ± 4 km/s
- Distance: 246.2 ± 17.3 Mly (75.49 ± 5.29 Mpc)
- Apparent magnitude (V): 12.3
- Magnitude (J): 10.088
- Magnitude (H): 9.340
- Magnitude (K): 8.981

Characteristics
- Type: Sa? pec
- Size: ~227,600 ly (69.77 kpc) (estimated)
- Apparent size (V): 2.5′ × 1.6′

Other designations
- IRAS 02071+3857, 2MASX J02100957+3911253, UGC 1655, MCG +06-05-092, PGC 8283, CGCG 522-125

NGC 828 is a spiral galaxy in the constellation of Andromeda. Its velocity with respect to the cosmic microwave background is 5200 ± 17 km/s, which corresponds to a Hubble distance of 250.2 ± 17.5 Mly (76.70 ± 5.37 Mpc). Additionally, three non-redshift measurements give a closer distance of 223.52 ± 7.06 Mly (68.533 ± 2.165 Mpc). It was discovered by German-British astronomer William Herschel on 18 October 1786.

NGC 828 is a LINER galaxy, i.e. it has a type of nucleus that is defined by its spectral line emission which has weakly ionized or neutral atoms, while the spectral line emission from strongly ionized atoms is relatively weak. In addition, NGC 828 is classified as a radio galaxy. NGC 828 is considered to be an infrared circumnuclear starburst galaxy and has a star formation rate surface density ($\Sigma_{SFR}$) of $1.10 M_\odot yr^{-1} kpc^{-2}$).

In the local environment of NGC 828, there are three other galaxies, which are UGC 1691, Seyfert II UGC 1757, Low surface brightness (LSB) UGC 1767 and UGC 1772.

One supernova has been observed in NGC 828: SN 2024lea (Type Ib, mag. 19.1) was discovered by the Zwicky Transient Facility on 10 June 2024.

== See also ==
- List of NGC objects (1–1000)
