= Galaxy X =

Galaxy X may refer to:

- Galaxy Nexus, a smartphone released in 2011, marketed in Brazil as the "Galaxy X"
- Galaxy X (galaxy), a postulated satellite galaxy of the Milky Way Galaxy
- "Galaxy X" (trilogy), a 2009 trilogy of The Hardy Boys novels, see List of Hardy Boys books
- Galaxy X (novel), a 2009 novel in the eponymous trilogy of "The Hardy Boys" novels, see List of Hardy Boys books

== See also ==
- X-shaped radio galaxy
- X-ray galaxy
- Galaxy Note 10.1
- Galaxy Tab 10.1
- Galaxy S10
- Galaxy Note10
- Galaxy 10, a satellite lost on launch in 1998; see Delta III#Launches
- Galaxy 10R
