= Dragonfly 44 =

Galaxy in constellation Coma Berenices

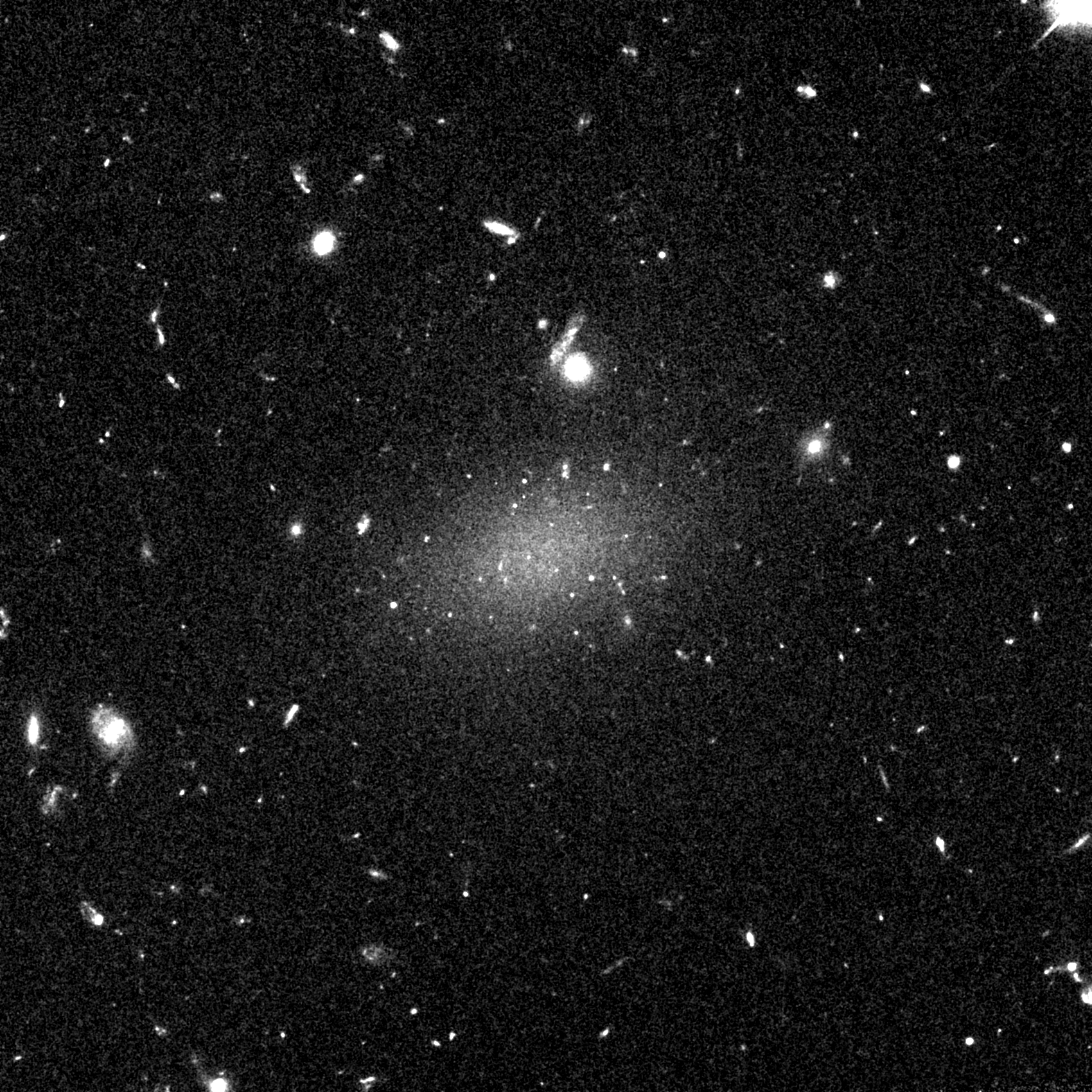
- Hubble Space Telescope view of the galaxy Dragonfly 44

Observation data (J2000 epoch)
- Constellation: Coma Berenices
- Right ascension: 13^{h} 00^{m} 58.0^{s}
- Declination: +26° 58′ 35″
- Redshift: ~0.023
- Heliocentric radial velocity: 6280 ± 120 km/s
- Distance: ~100 Mpc (~330 Mly)
- Group or cluster: Coma Cluster
- Apparent magnitude (V): 21 mags; or 19.4 mags
- Apparent magnitude (B): 22
- Absolute magnitude (V): -16.1 mag

Characteristics
- Mass: ~1.6×10^{11} M_{☉}
- Apparent size (V): 10 x 35 arcsec

Other designations
- SDSS J130057.98+265839.6, SDSS J130058.17+265836.1, SDSS J130058.21+265829.3

Dragonfly 44 is an ultra diffuse galaxy in the Coma Cluster. This galaxy is well-known because observations of the velocity dispersion in 2016 suggested a mass of about one trillion solar masses, about the same as the Milky Way. This mass was consistent with a count of about 90 and 70 globular clusters observed around Dragonfly 44 in two different studies.

Later, spatially resolved kinematics measured a mass of about 160 billion solar masses, six times less than early mass measurements and one order of magnitude less than the Milky Way's mass. The most recent work found 20 globular clusters around the galaxy, which is consistent with the current mass measurement. The lack of X-ray emission from the galaxy and its surroundings also shows that the number of globular clusters cannot be as many as was claimed before.

The galaxy emits only 1% of the light emitted by the Milky Way. The galaxy was discovered with the Dragonfly Telephoto Array.

== Early study ==
To determine the amount of dark matter in this galaxy, in 2016, astronomers used the DEIMOS instrument installed on Keck II to measure the velocities of stars for 33.5 hours for six nights so they could determine the galaxy's mass. The scientists then used the Gemini Multi-Object Spectrograph on the 8-m Gemini North telescope to reveal a halo of spherical clusters of stars around the galaxy's core. Following this observation, in August 2016, astronomers reported that this galaxy might be made almost entirely of dark matter.

== See also ==
- Globular cluster – Spherical collection of stars
- Low surface brightness galaxy – Galaxy which is less bright than the ambient night sky (LSB galaxy)
- NGC 1052-DF2 – Ultra diffuse galaxy in the constellation Cetus – a galaxy thought to contain almost no dark matter.
- Type-cD galaxy – Galaxy morphology classification or c-Diffuse galaxy type
- Type-D galaxy – System for categorizing galaxies based on appearance or Diffuse-type galaxy
- Ultra-diffuse galaxy – Extremely low luminosity galaxy
- Dark matter halo – Theoretical cosmological structure
- DGSAT I – Ultra diffuse galaxy in the Perseus–Pisces Supercluster
