= UGC 711 =

Galaxy in the constellation Cetus

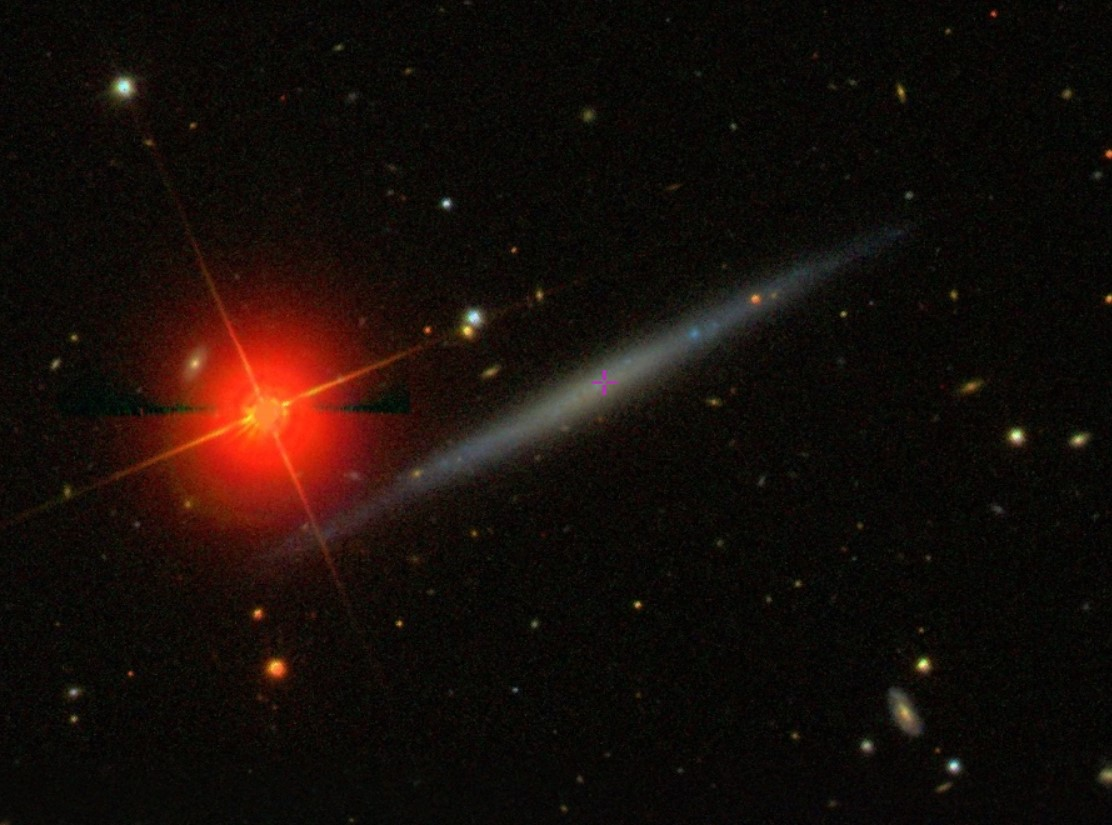
- UGC 711 imaged by SDSS. The star to the left of the galaxy is TYC 19-146-2

Observation data (J2000 epoch)
- Constellation: Cetus
- Right ascension: 01^{h} 08^{m} 36.90^{s}
- Declination: +01° 38′ 30.0″
- Redshift: 0.006611
- Heliocentric radial velocity: 1,982 km/s
- Distance: 77 Mly (23.6 Mpc)
- Apparent magnitude (V): 0.069
- Apparent magnitude (B): 0.092
- Surface brightness: 14.39

Characteristics
- Type: SB (s)d?, sp
- Apparent size (V): 4.65' x 0.30'
- Notable features: Superthin spiral galaxy

Other designations
- PGC 4063, FGC 0124, RFGC 0255, MCG +00-04-008, CGCG 385-005

UGC 711 is a spiral galaxy located in the constellation of Cetus. Estimated to be located 77 million light-years from Earth, the galaxy's luminosity class is IV and it has a HI line width region. It belongs to the equatorial region of Eridanus Void with an arcsec approximation of ≈ 250.

== Morphology ==
UGC 711 is considered a low-surface brightness galaxy (LSB) with a diffuse stellar disk.

With a surface brightness measurement found ~1 magnitude less illuminated compared to μ _{B,0} = 21.65 mag arcsec^{−2} according to K.C. Freeman, UGC 711 is one of best studied superthin galaxies defined by its atypical classification when seen edge-on. It has a flat structure with only a diameter estimating to be a = 40 arcsecs but has a major-to-minor axis ratio wider than 7 arcsecs.

The rotational velocity of UGC 711 is said to be only V_{circ} = 92 km s^{−1} according to measurements from Hyperleda.
