= NGC 296 =

Spiral galaxy in the constellation Pisces

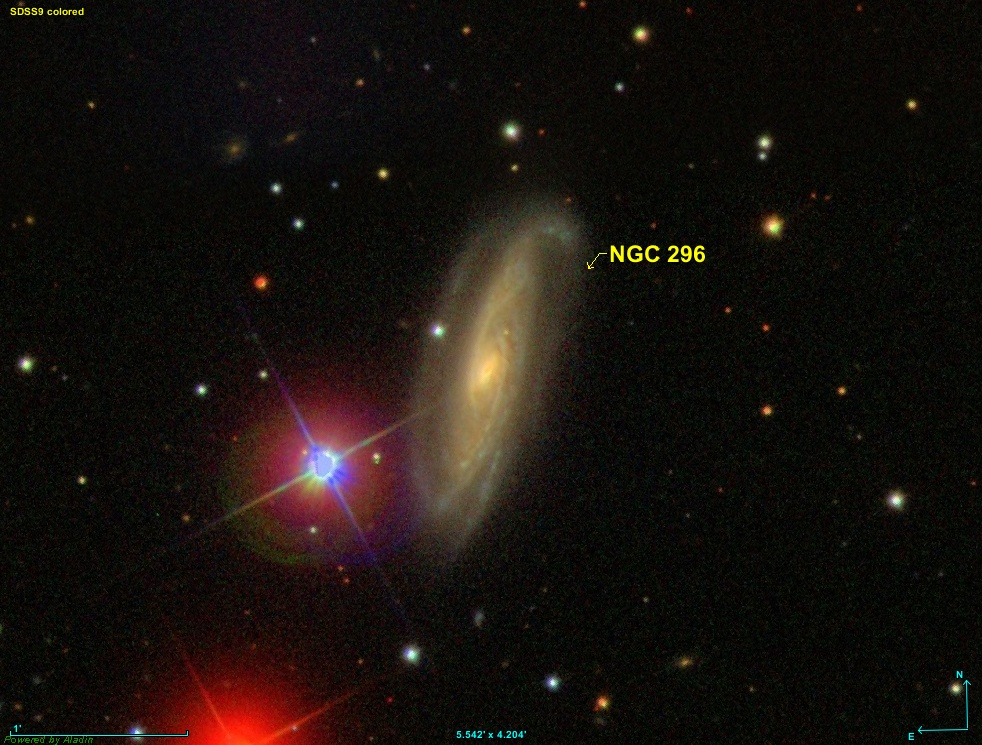
- SDSS image of NGC 296

Observation data (J2000.0 epoch)
- Constellation: Pisces
- Right ascension: 00^{h} 55^{m} 21.533^{s}
- Declination: +31° 40′ 38.21″

Characteristics
- Type: Sc

Other designations
- LEDA 3274, NGC 296, PGC 3274, UGC 565, MCG+05-03-027

NGC 296 is a low surface brightness unbarred spiral galaxy in the constellation of Pisces. The designation NGC 295 is sometimes mistakenly used for NGC 296.

== Supernova ==
One supernova has been observed in NGC 296:

- SN 2023lzn (Type II, mag. 18.5) was discovered by ATLAS on 28 June 2023.

== See also ==
- Low-surface-brightness galaxy
- Spiral galaxy
