= NGC 7222 =

Large barred spiral galaxy in the constellation Aquarius

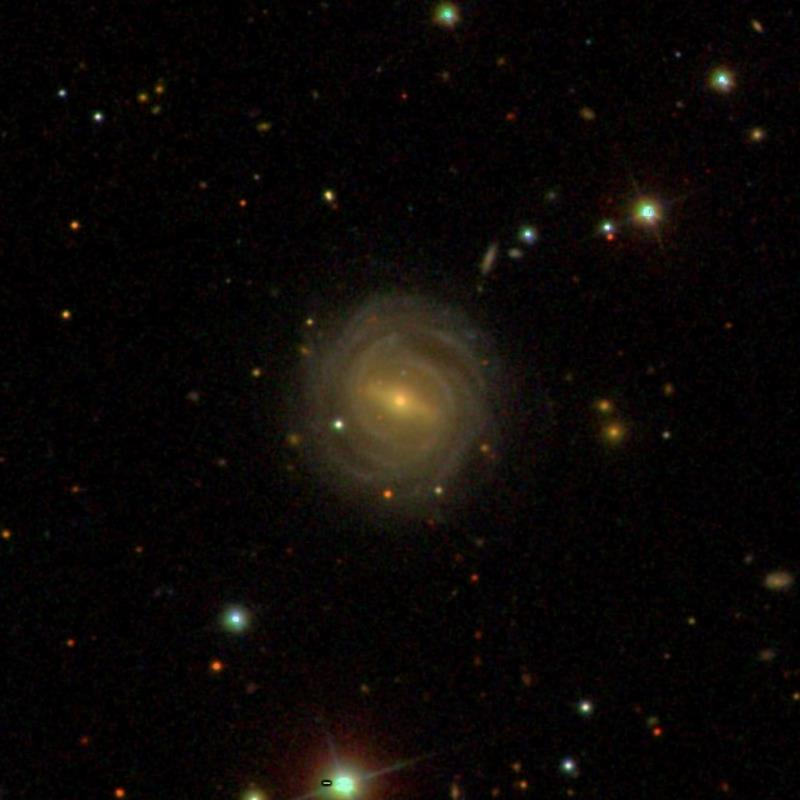
- Sloan Digital Sky Survey image of barred spiral galaxy NGC 7222

Observation data (J2000 epoch)
- Constellation: Aquarius
- Right ascension: 22h 10m 51.760s
- Declination: +02d 06m 20.87s
- Redshift: 0.041195
- Heliocentric radial velocity: 12,350 km/s
- Distance: 568 Mly (174.1 Mpc)
- Apparent magnitude (V): 14.59
- Surface brightness: 14.20 mag/am

Characteristics
- Size: 281,000 ly
- Apparent size (V): 1.2 x 1.2 arcmin

Other designations
- PGC 68224, UGC 11934, CGCG 377-035, MCG +00-56-012, 2MASX J22105172+0206205, NSA 149629, SDSS J221051.74+020620.9, LEDA 68224

NGC 7222 is a large barred spiral galaxy with a ring structure, located in the constellation Aquarius. It is located 570 million light-years away from the Solar System and was discovered by German astronomer, Albert Marth on August 11, 1864.

NGC 7222 has a luminosity class of II and it has a broad H I line which contains regions of ionized hydrogen. NGC 7222 also has a surface brightness of 14.20 mag/am, which means it is considered a low surface brightness galaxy (LSB). LSBs are diffuse galaxies that have surface brightness one magnitude lower compared to the ambient night sky.

== Supernova ==
One supernova has been discovered in NGC 7222 so far: SN 2008dr.

SN 2008dr

SN 2008dr was discovered by a team of astronomers; J. Leja, D. Madison, W. Li, and A. V. Filippenko from University of California, Berkeley as part of Lick Observatory Supernova Search (LOSS). It had a magnitude of 16.8 and was located 1".3 west and 8".1 north of the nucleus. SN 2008dr was confirmed to be a Type Ia.

== Companion galaxy ==
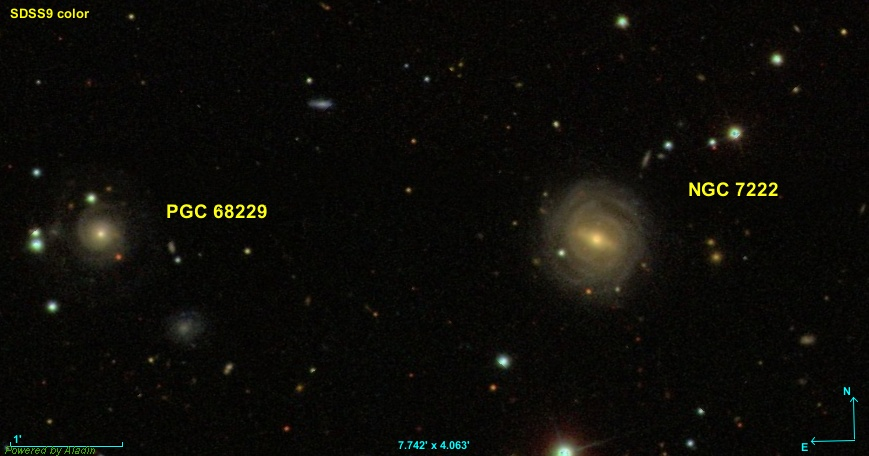
NGC 7222 with PGC 68229 (left)

NGC 7222 has a companion which is a spiral galaxy, PGC 68229, also known as CGCG 377-036. The galaxy is located west of NGC 7222 at close proximity and is 579 million light-years distant. It is possible both galaxies together make up a galactic pair.
