= DGSAT I =

Ultra diffuse galaxy in the Perseus–Pisces Supercluster

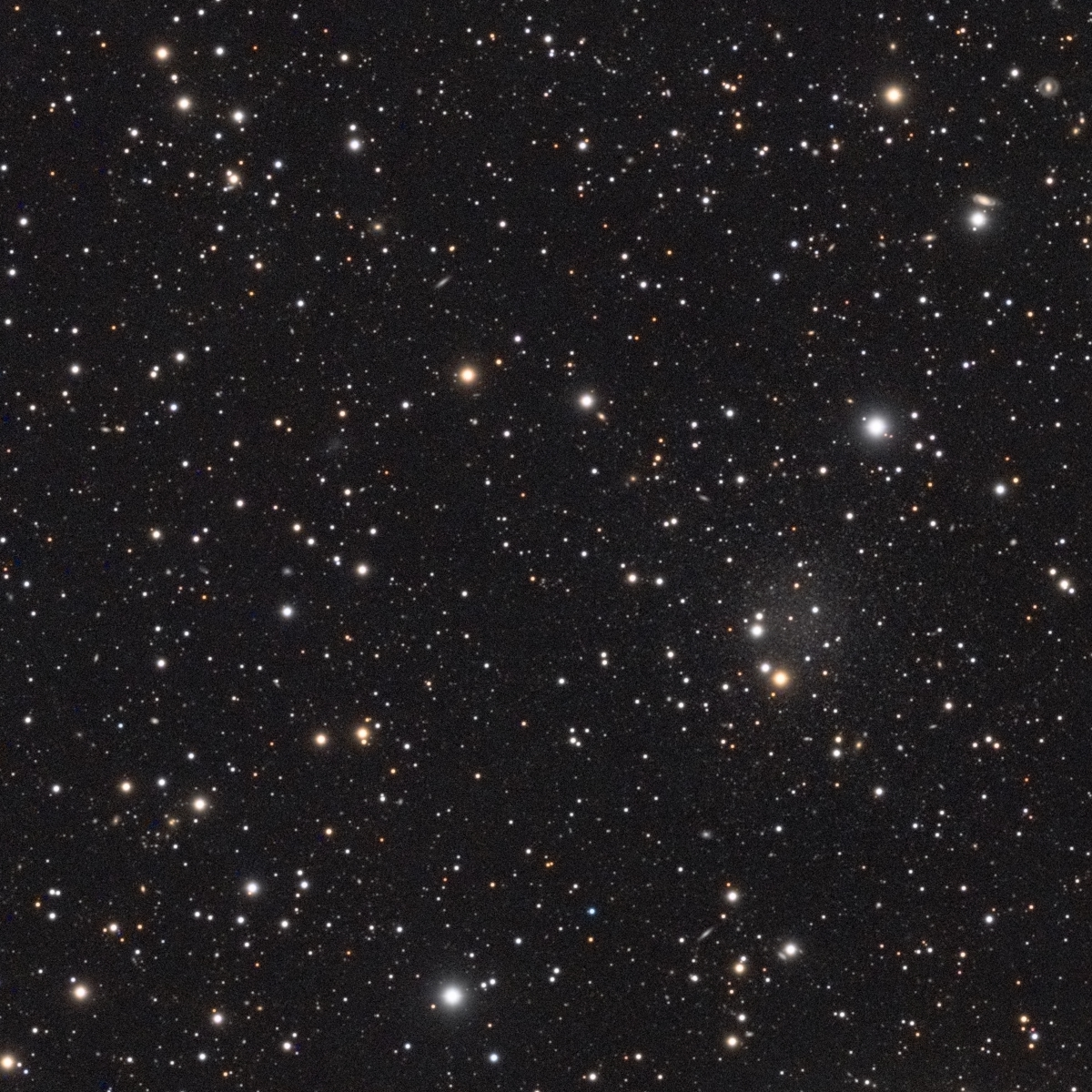

Observation data (J2000 epoch)
- Constellation: Pisces
- Right ascension: 01^{h} 17^{m} 35.59^{s}
- Declination: 33° 31′ 42″
- Redshift: 78 Mpc
- Heliocentric radial velocity: 5450 ± 40 km/s
- Distance: 254.4 ± 3.3 Mly (78 ± 1 Mpc)
- Apparent magnitude (V): 18.18 ± 0.04
- Absolute magnitude (V): -16.3 ± 0.1 mag

Characteristics
- Mass: 4.0 × 10×10^{8} M_{☉}
- Mass/Light ratio: 1.1 M_{☉}/L_{☉}

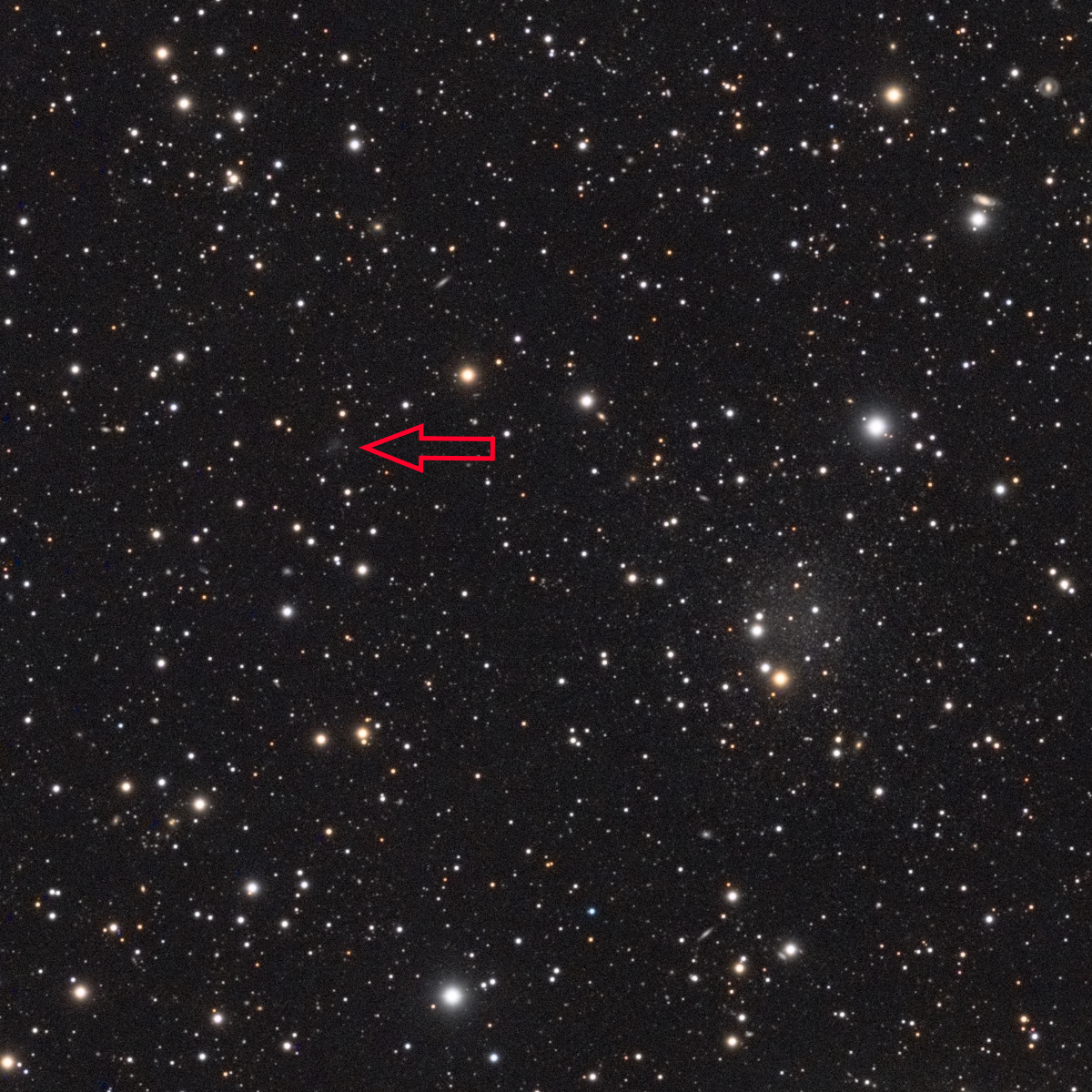
DGSAT I. Ultra diffuse galaxies are hard to spot due to low luminosity and wispy appearance.

DGSAT I is a quenched, ultra diffuse galaxy (UDG) located on the outskirts of the Pisces-Perseus Supercluster, identified in 2016 during a visual inspection of a full color image of the Andromeda II dwarf galaxy. DGSAT I resides in a low-density environment compared to the densities where UDGs are typically found. Its chemical makeup have led astronomers to propose it was formed during the dawn of the universe when galaxies emerged in a different environment than today.

== Discovery and identification ==
DGSAT I was first identified by the DGSAT project in 2016. The DGSAT (Dwarf Galaxy Survey with Amateur Telescopes) uses the potential of privately owned small-sized telescopes to probe low surface brightness (LSB) features around large galaxies and aims to increase the sample size of the dwarf satellite galaxies in the Local Volume.

At first astronomers thought DGSAT I to be an isolated dwarf galaxy beyond the Local Group due to its structural properties and absence of emission lines. A spectroscopic observation later revealed DGSAT I to be a background system and likely associated with an outer filament of the Pisces-Perseus super-cluster.

== Chemical composition ==
The chemical composition of a galaxy provides record of the ambient conditions during its formation. The mass ratios of alpha-elements such as magnesium to iron ([Mg/Fe]) trace time-scales for star formation, as these elements are produced by stars according to different lifetimes. Younger galaxies tend to have more heavy elements in its chemical makeup compared to ancient galaxies formed during an early age of the universe.

DGSAT I's integral field spectroscopy data shows a remarkably low iron content, suggesting an early galaxy formed from a nearly pristine gas cloud, unpolluted by the supernova death of previous stars, however its magnesium levels are consistent with what astronomers expect to find in younger galaxies. This apparent chemical makeup discrepancy and DGSAT I's isolation from galaxy clusters are helping astronomers to develop new theories concerning the birth and formation of UDGs.

UDGs are hard to observe due to their extremely low luminosity but there are studies being conducted using the Keck Cosmic Web Imager in an attempt to shed light on the precise relation between DGSAT I's metallicity and its possibly exotic origin. A paper published in 2022 proposed DGSAT I to be a “failed galaxy” that formed relatively few stars in proportion to its halo mass, and could be related to cluster UDGs whose size and quiescence pre-date their infall (i.e. when molecular transition shows evidence of gas flowing into the core of the star).

== See also ==
- Dragonfly 44
- NGC 1052-DF2
- Low surface brightness galaxy
- Galaxy morphological classification
