= NGC 7253 =

Galaxy in the constellation Pegasus

- The spiral galaxy pair NGC 7253 imaged by the Gemini North telescope

Observation data (J2000 epoch)
- Constellation: Pegasus
- Right ascension: 22^{h} 19^{m} 28.9^{s}
- Declination: 29° 23′ 30.0″
- Redshift: 0.015738
- Heliocentric radial velocity: 4718 km/s
- Distance: 203.7 Mly (62.46 Mpc) & 200.4 Mly (61.43 Mpc)
- Apparent magnitude (V): 13.2 & 14.3

Characteristics
- Type: Double System
- Size: ~135,000 ly (41.40 kpc) & 71,400 ly (21.88 kpc) (estimated)
- Apparent size (V): 1.7' x 0.8' & 1.6' x 0.5'

Other designations
- Arp 278, UGC 11984 & 11985, MCG +05-52-010 & +05-52-011, PGC 68572 & 68573, CGCG 494-014, VV 242

NGC 7253 is a pair of spiral galaxies in the constellation Pegasus. It was discovered by the German-British astronomer Albert Marth on 9 September 1863. It is listed in Halton Arp's Atlas of Peculiar Galaxies as Arp 278, as an example of gravitationally interacting galaxies.

Of the pair, the galaxy to the north is known individually as NGC 7253A. Its velocity relative to the cosmic microwave background is 4,235 ± 24 km/s, which corresponds to a Hubble distance of 62.5 ± 4.4 Mpc (~204 million light-years). The other galaxy in the pair is known individually as NGC 7253B. Its velocity relative to the cosmic microwave background is 4,165 ± 24 km/s, which corresponds to a Hubble distance of 61.4 ± 4.3 Mpc (~200 million light-years).

With a surface brightness equal to 14.06 Mag/arcsec^{2}, NGC 7253B can be described as a low surface brightness galaxy.

NGC 7253 has a possible active galactic nucleus, i.e. it has a compact region at the center of a galaxy that emits a significant amount of energy across the electromagnetic spectrum, with characteristics indicating that this luminosity is not produced by the stars.

== Supernova ==
One supernova has been observed in NGC 7253B: SN 2002jg (Type Ia, mag. 17) was discovered by Mike Schwartz and LOTOSS (Lick Observatory and Tenagra Observatory Supernova Searches) on 23 November 2002.

== Image Gallery ==
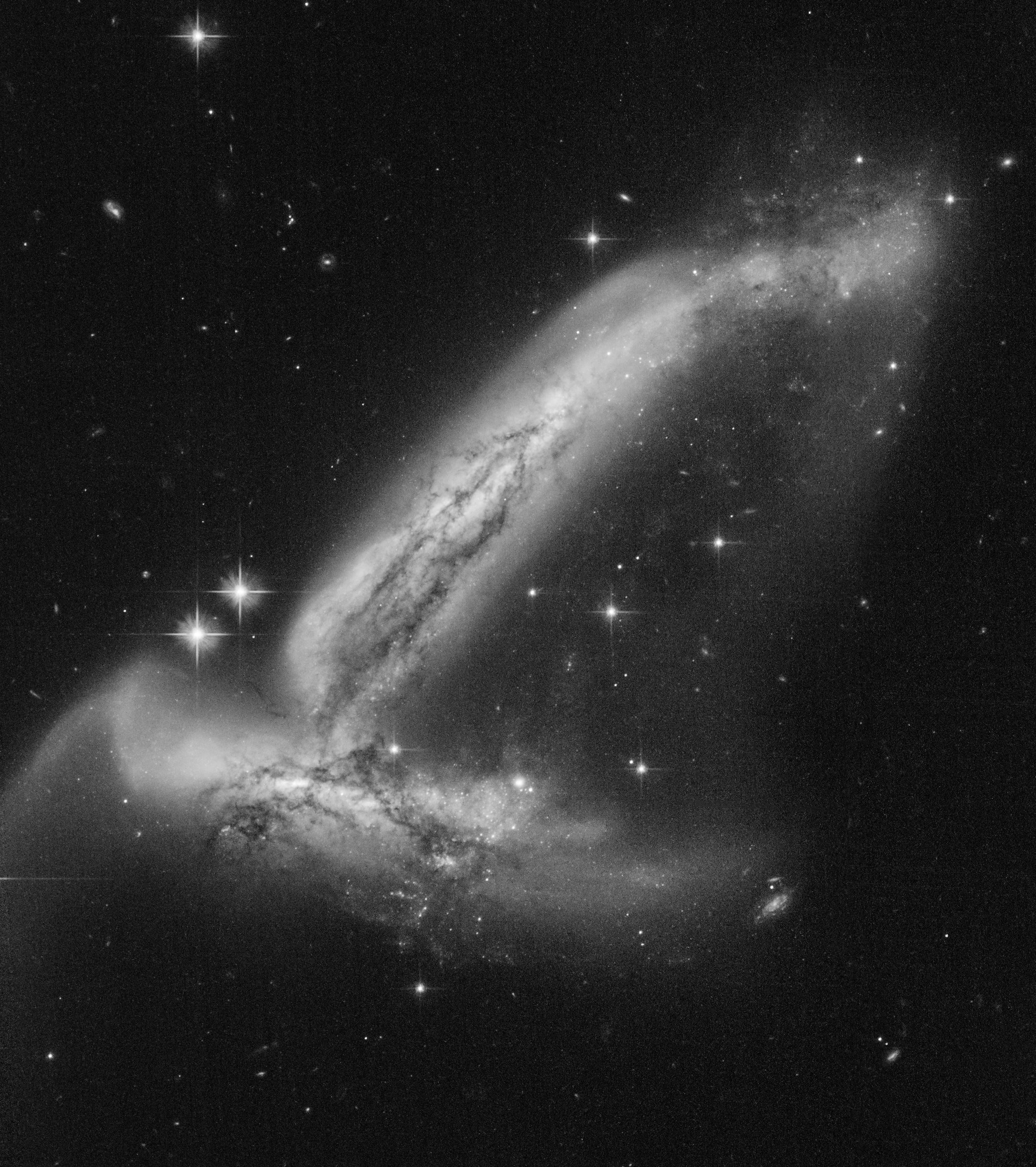
NGC 7253 imaged by the Hubble Space Telescope (data processing by Judy Schmidt).

== See also ==
- List of NGC objects (7001–7840)
