= Dunlap Institute for Astronomy and Astrophysics =

Academic unit at the University of Toronto

Coordinates: 43°39′38″N 79°23′50″W

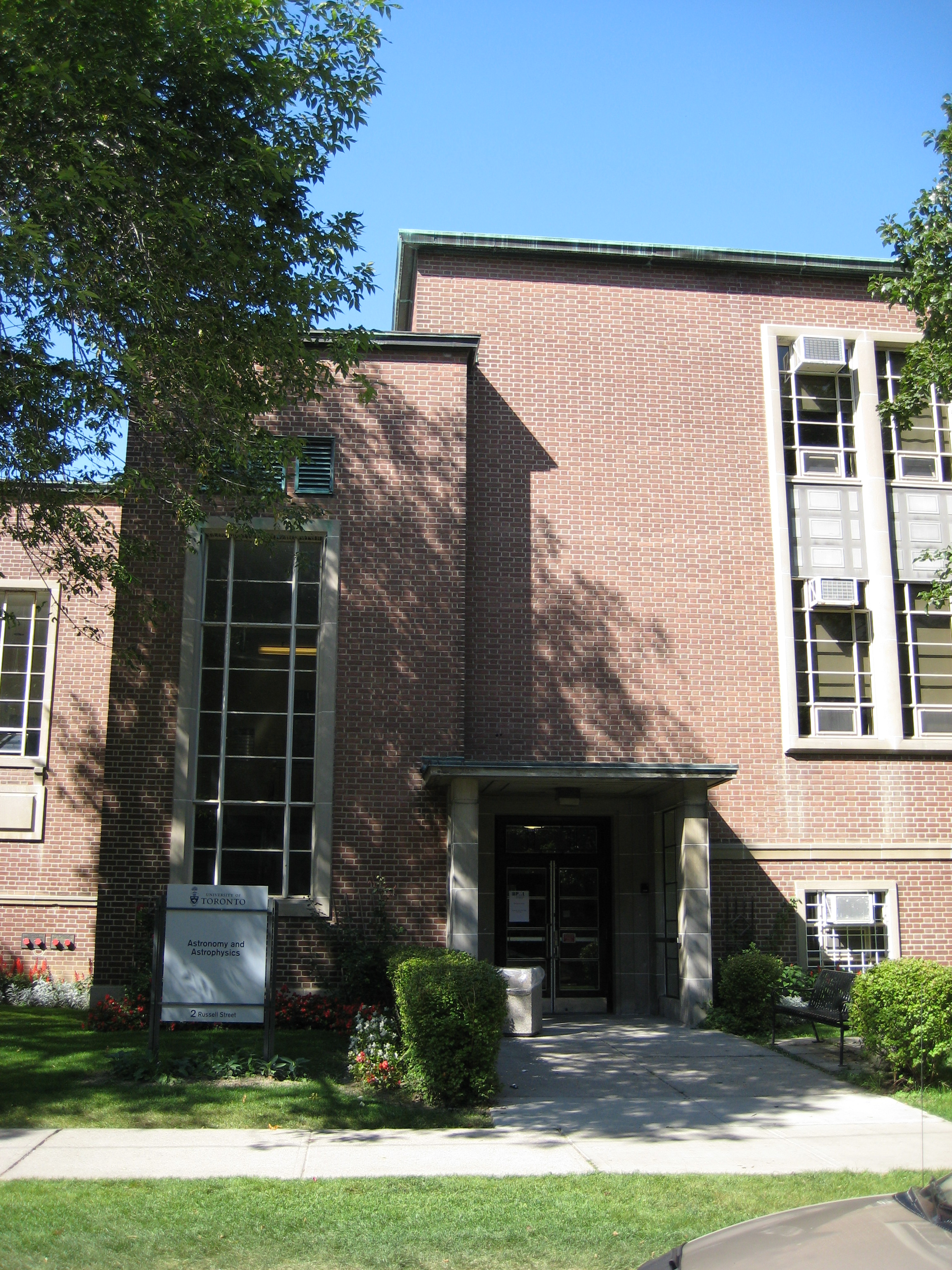
- The Astronomy and Astrophysics Building
- Established: 2008
- Parent institution: University of Toronto Faculty of Arts and Science
- Director: Suresh Sivanandam
- Location: Toronto, Ontario, Canada
- Website: dunlap.utoronto.ca

The Dunlap Institute for Astronomy and Astrophysics is an astronomical research centre at the University of Toronto, based on the St. George campus in downtown Toronto, Ontario, Canada. It is an extra-departmental unit within the university's Faculty of Arts and Science.

The institute was founded in 2008 with the help of endowed gifts to the University of Toronto from David M. Dunlap and J. Moffat Dunlap, using the proceeds from the sale of the David Dunlap Observatory. The Dunlap Institute is allied with and co-located with the University of Toronto's Department of Astronomy & Astrophysics and with the Canadian Institute for Theoretical Astrophysics, and no longer has any association or connection to the David Dunlap Observatory.

== Research ==
Astronomers at the Dunlap Institute investigate a variety of topics including:

- the structure of the Milky Way Galaxy
- cosmic magnetic fields
- cosmic explosions
- the large scale structure in the universe
- Dark Energy
- the Cosmic Microwave Background

== Technology & Instrumentation ==
Telescope, instrumentation and software projects with leadership from Dunlap scientists include:

- The Dragonfly Telephoto Array, which comprises many telephoto lens and is designed to detect dim astronomical objects. Dragonfly was co-designed by the U of T's Roberto Abraham and Yale's Pieter van Dokkum.
- The Canadian Hydrogen Intensity Mapping Experiment (CHIME)
- The South Pole Telescope, designed to study the Cosmic Microwave Background from its location at the South Pole
- The Gemini InfraRed Multi-Object Spectrograph (GIRMOS), to be deployed on the Gemini South telescope in Chile in 2024
- The Canadian Initiative for Radio Astronomy Data Analysis (CIRADA), which is producing advanced data products for the CHIME, ASKAP and VLA radio telescopes, and which is a pilot project for a Canadian Square Kilometre Array data centre.

== Training ==
At the Dunlap's annual Introduction to Astronomical Instrumentation Summer School, undergraduate and graduate students from around the world attend lectures and labs. Undergraduate students also pursue summer research projects at the Dunlap Institute's Summer Undergraduate Research Program.

== Public outreach ==
The Dunlap Institute runs many public outreach events including:

- Astronomy on Tap TO
- SpaceTime
- Cool Cosmos (part of the International Year of Astronomy in 2009)
- Transit of Venus viewing (2012)
- Toronto Science Festival (in partnership with U of T Science Engagement) (2013)
- Dunlap Prize Lecture featuring Neil deGrasse Tyson (2014)
- Supermoon Lunar Eclipse viewing (2015)
- Partial Solar Eclipse viewing (2017)
- Planet gazing parties, in partnership with the Royal Astronomical Society of Canada

== Directors ==
- 2010 - 2012: James R. Graham
- 2012 – 2015: Peter Martin (Acting/Interim)
- 2015 – 2023: Bryan Gaensler
- 2023 - present: Suresh Sivanandam

== See also ==
- List of academic units of the University of Toronto
