= NGC 1052-DF2 =

Ultra diffuse galaxy in the constellation Cetus

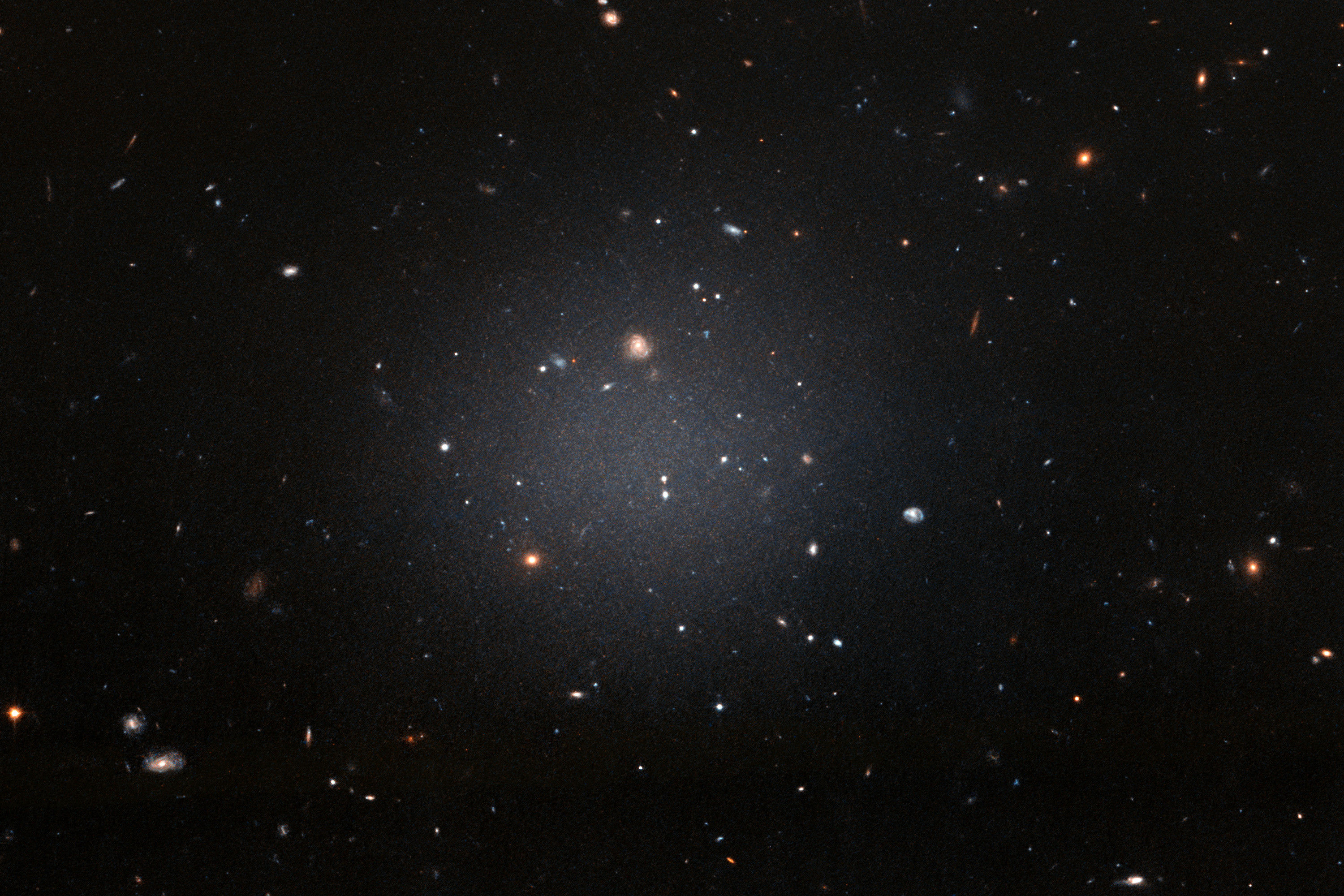
- Hubble Space Telescope image of NGC 1052-DF2

Observation data (J2000 epoch)
- Constellation: Cetus
- Right ascension: 02^{h} 41^{m} 46.8^{s}
- Declination: −08° 24′ 12″
- Distance: 22.1 ± 1.2 Mpc (72.1 ± 3.9 Mly)

Characteristics
- Type: Sp...
- Mass: 2×10^{8} M_{☉}
- Apparent size (V): 1.20′ × 1.12′

Other designations
- PGC 3097693

NGC 1052-DF2 is an ultra diffuse galaxy (UDG) identified in a wide-field imaging survey of the NGC 1052 group by the Dragonfly Telephoto Array. It has been proposed that the galaxy contains little or no dark matter, the first such discovery. On 20 March 2019, a follow-up study announcing the discovery of a second UDG lacking dark matter, NGC 1052-DF4, was published.

NGC 1052-DF2 is located in the constellation Cetus, near the border with Eridanus.

== Distance ==
Initial observations of NGC 1052-DF2 used its surface brightness fluctuation to estimate its distance at 19.0±1.7 Mpc. Due to close proximity, it is assumed to be associated with the elliptical galaxy NGC 1052 and to lie at a distance of about 80 Kpc from NGC 1052.

On 3 June 2019, however, a separate team used a full observing dataset on the same object to review this claim. Using five independent methods to estimate distances of heavenly bodies, a team of researchers from the Instituto de Astrofísica de Canarias (IAC) found the distance of NGC 1052-DF2 to be 42 million light years (13 MPc), not some 64 million light years (19 MPc) from the Earth. If confirmed, the total mass of the galaxy would have been around one-half of the mass estimated previously, whereas the mass of its stars would have been only about one-quarter of the estimated mass. This implied a significant part of NGC 1052-DF2 could be made up of dark matter, like any other galaxy.

However, follow-up observations using Hubble Space Telescope Advanced Camera for Surveys imaging measured the tip of the red-giant branch distance to NGC 1052-DF2, which IAC researchers detected at 13 Mpc, to be 22.1±1.2 Mpc, consistent with earlier surface brightness fluctuation measurements.

== Dark matter ==
The apparent lack of dark matter in NGC 1052-DF2 may help prove that dark matter is real: If what appears to be dark matter is really just a currently unknown effect of the gravity of ordinary matter then this apparent dark matter should also appear in this galaxy. Further study will be needed before this and any other possible implications can be confirmed. If confirmed, the absence of dark matter may also have implications for theories of galaxy formation, as dark matter has been thought to be needed for galaxy formation.

A later study purports to show that the galaxy may contain more dark matter than initially reported. It may have a mass-to-light ratio towards the low end of expected values for a dwarf galaxy. However, a follow-up study on 20 March 2018 and a new discovery of a second ultra diffuse galaxy, NGC 1052-DF4, also apparently lacking dark matter, challenges the prior study's conclusion. In June 2021 further observations by Hubble have confirmed NGC 1052-DF2 as deficient in dark matter.

On the other hand, if the galaxy does not accrete any matter from its intergalactic environment, there is no need for considering retarded gravitational potentials that can explain the rotation curves of many different galaxy types without assuming any dark matter.

== Other similar galaxies ==
Astronomers discovered a second galaxy with no dark matter, NGC 1052-DF4, which is another ultra diffuse galaxy - quite large, spread-out, and faint to observe. Discovering another galaxy with very little to no dark matter means the chances of finding more of these galaxies may be higher than cosmologists previously thought.

Another group of astronomers have found the existence of tidal tails in NGC 1052-DF4 indicating that the lack of dark matter may have been caused by the interaction with a nearby neighbor (a low mass disk galaxy, NGC 1035). The interaction would naturally explain the low content of dark matter inferred for this galaxy and would reconcile these types of galaxies with our current models of galaxy formation.

A third galaxy without dark matter was identified in 2025, FCC 224.

== See also ==
- Abell 520
- Bullet Cluster
- Dragonfly 44 – a galaxy thought to be almost all dark matter.
- DGSAT I – Ultra diffuse galaxy in the Perseus–Pisces Supercluster
