= NGC 251 =

Galaxy in the constellation Pisces

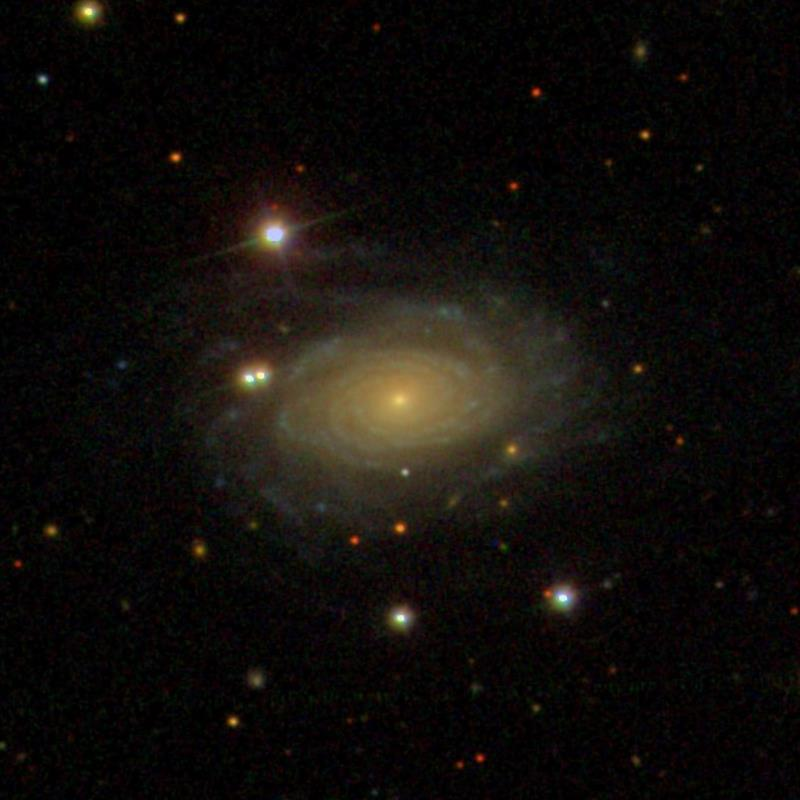
- SDSS image of NGC 251

Observation data (J2000 epoch)
- Constellation: Pisces
- Right ascension: 00^{h} 47^{m} 54.0517^{s}
- Declination: +19° 35′ 48.788″
- Redshift: 0.015184
- Heliocentric radial velocity: 4556 km/s
- Distance: 204.36 ± 12.64 Mly (62.657 ± 3.876 Mpc)
- Apparent magnitude (B): 14.6

Characteristics
- Type: Sc
- Size: 149,300 ly (45,780 pc) (Note: POSS1 103a-O values used.)
- Apparent size (V): 2.4′ × 1.9′

Other designations
- KPG 015B, UGC 490, PGC 2806, CGCG 458-005

NGC 251 is a spiral galaxy in the constellation of Pisces. Its velocity with respect to the cosmic microwave background for is 4,224±23 km/s, which corresponds to a Hubble distance of 203.2 ± 14.3 Mly (62.30 ± 4.37 Mpc). Additionally, six non redshift measurements give a distance of 205.32 ± 5.54 Mly (62.950 ± 1.699 Mpc). It was discovered on October 15, 1784, by German-British astronomer William Herschel.

According to I.D. Karachentsev, NGC 251 forms an isolated galaxy pair with UGC 477.

One supernova has been observed in NGC 251: SN 2023rky (Type II, mag. 18.6) was discovered by the Zwicky Transient Facility on 6 September 2023.

== See also ==
- List of NGC objects (1–1000)
