= UGC 477 =

Galaxy in the constellation Pisces

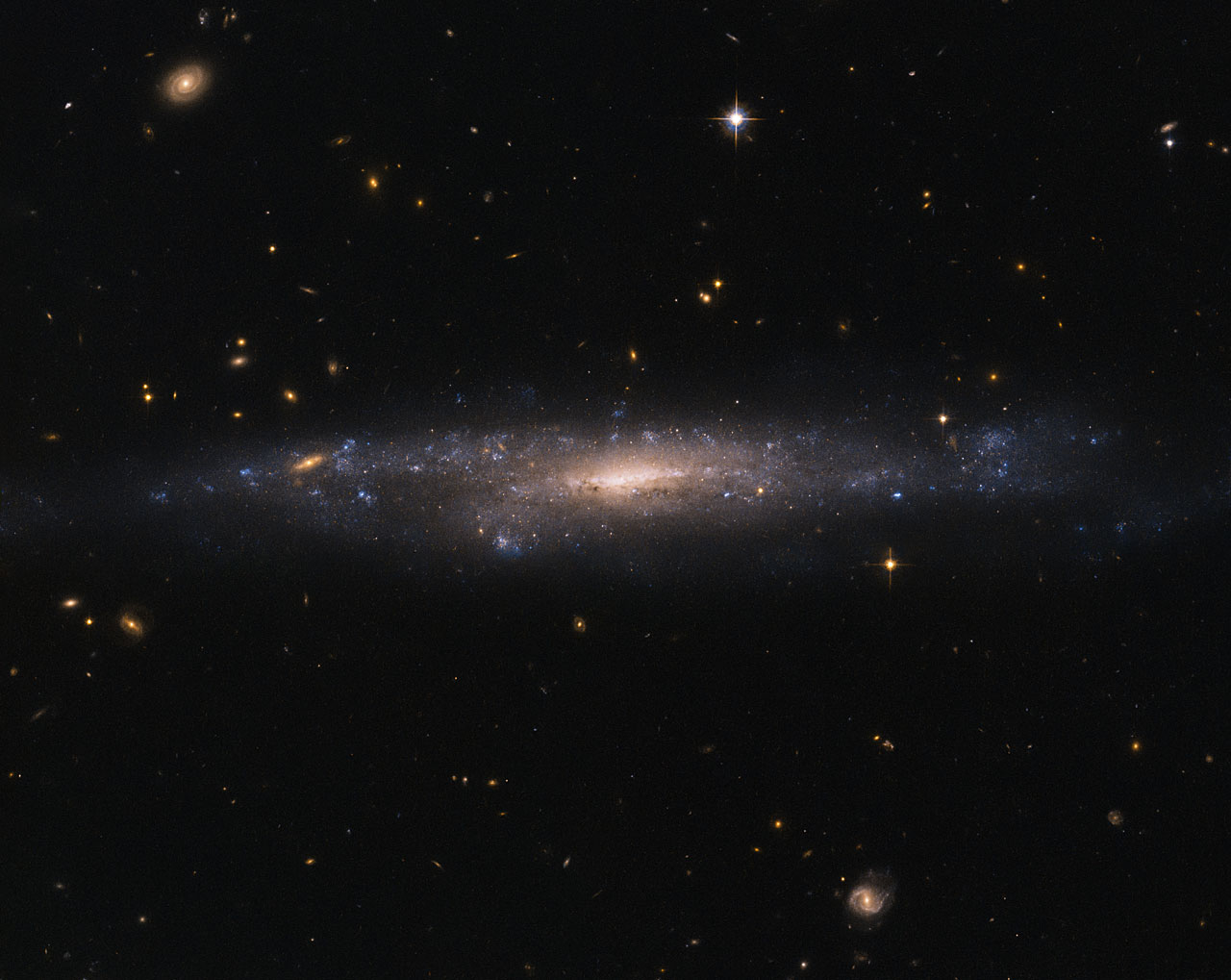
- The low surface brightness (LSB) galaxy UGC 477 imaged by the Hubble Space Telescope

Observation data (J2000 epoch)
- Constellation: Pisces
- Right ascension: 00^{h} 46^{m} 13.1067^{s}
- Declination: +19° 29′ 23.760″
- Redshift: 0.008836
- Heliocentric radial velocity: 2649 km/s
- Distance: 117.52 ± 6.11 Mly (36.033 ± 1.872 Mpc)
- Apparent magnitude (V): 14.70
- Apparent magnitude (B): 15.4

Characteristics
- Type: Sdm:
- Size: 100,000 ly (31,000 pc)
- Apparent size (V): 1.633′ × 0.490′
- Notable features: Low-surface-brightness galaxy

Other designations
- KPG 015A, MCG +03-03-002, PGC 2699, CGCG 458-004

UGC 477 is a low surface brightness (LSB) galaxy, located in the constellation Pisces. It is located over 110 million light years away. At around 100,000 light years across, it is similar in size to the Milky Way galaxy. The earliest known reference to this galaxy comes from part 2 of the Morphological Catalogue of Galaxies, published in 1964, where it is listed as MCG +03-03-002.

According to I.D. Karachentsev, UGC 477 forms an isolated galaxy pair with NGC 251.

== Image gallery ==
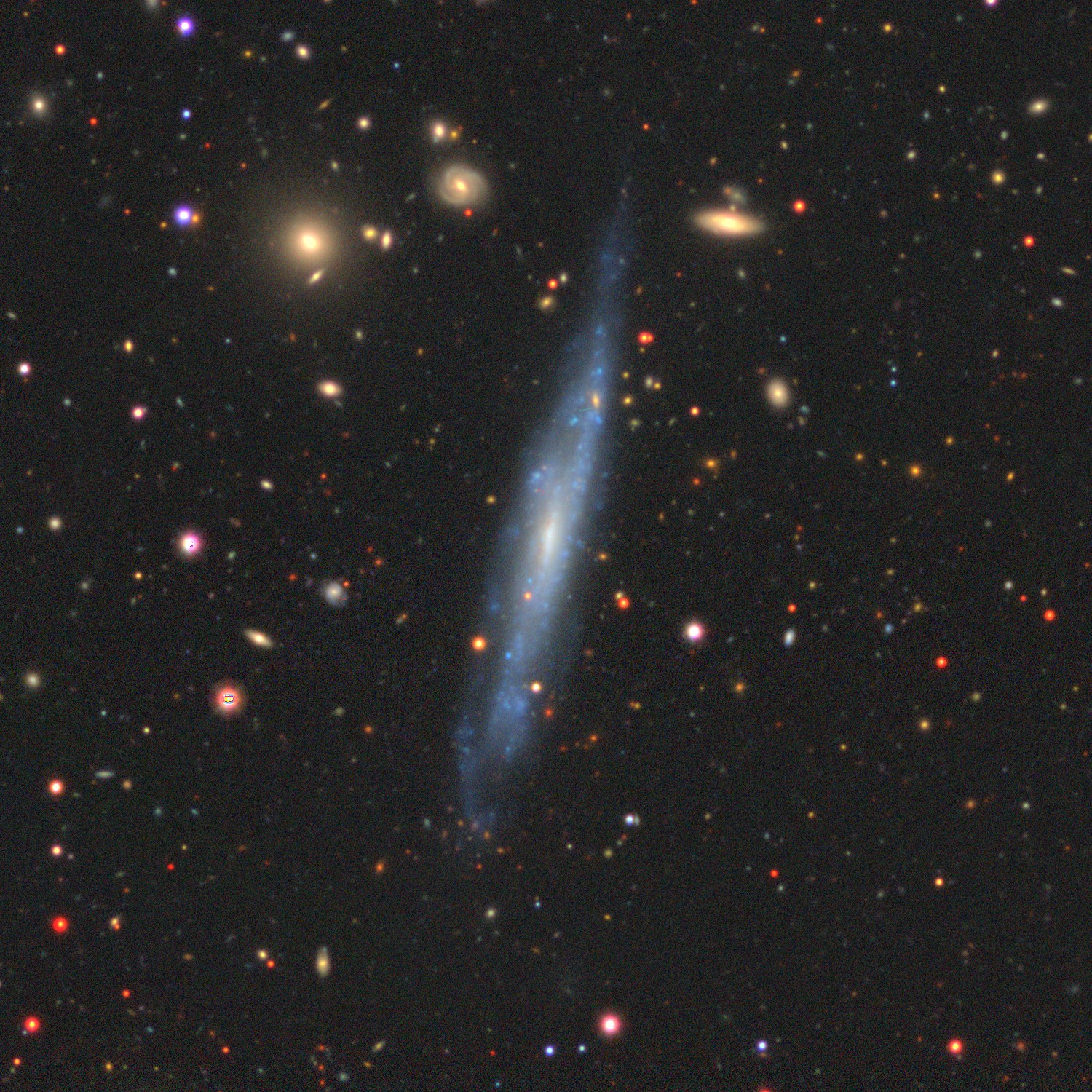
UGC 477 imaged by Legacy Surveys
