= Messier 99 =

Galaxy in the constellation Coma Berenices

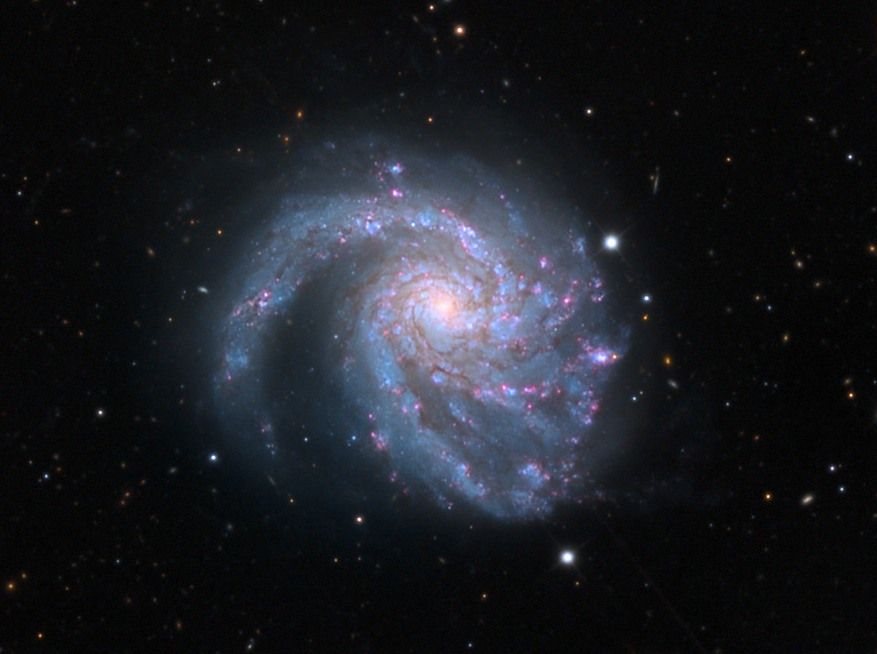
- Messier 99 as seen from the Schulman Telescope

Observation data (J2000 epoch)
- Constellation: Coma Berenices
- Right ascension: 12^{h} 18^{m} 49.625^{s}
- Declination: +14° 24′ 59.36″
- Redshift: 0.008029
- Heliocentric radial velocity: 2,404 km/s
- Distance: 45.2 Mly (13.87 Mpc)
- Group or cluster: Virgo Cluster
- Apparent magnitude (V): 9.9

Characteristics
- Type: SA(s)c
- Size: 98,130 ly (30.10 kpc) (estimated)
- Apparent size (V): 5.4′ × 4.7′

Other designations
- Coma Pinwheel Galaxy, Virgo Cluster Pinwheel, M99, NGC 4254, PGC 39578, UGC 7345

Messier 99 or M99, also known as NGC 4254, the Coma Pinwheel Galaxy, or St. Catherine's Wheel, is a grand design spiral galaxy in the northern constellation Coma Berenices approximately 15,000,000 parsecs (49,000,000 light-years) from the Milky Way. It was discovered by Pierre Méchain on 17 March 1781. The discovery was then reported to Charles Messier, who included the object in the Messier Catalogue of comet-like objects. It was one of the first galaxies in which a spiral pattern was seen. This pattern was first identified by Lord Rosse in the spring of 1846.

This galaxy has a morphological classification of SA(s)c, indicating a pure spiral shape with loosely wound arms. It has a peculiar shape with one normal looking arm and an extended arm that is less tightly wound. The galaxy is inclined by 42° to the line-of-sight with a major axis position angle of 68°.

A bridge of neutral hydrogen gas links NGC 4254 with VIRGOHI21, an HI region and a possible dark galaxy. The gravity from the latter may have distorted M99 and drawn out the gas bridge, as the two galaxy-sized objects may have had a close encounter before parting greatly. However, VIRGOHI21 may instead be tidal debris from an interaction with the lenticular galaxy NGC 4262 some 280 million years ago. It is expected that the drawn out arm will relax to match the normal arm once the encounter is over.

While not classified as a starburst galaxy, M99 has a star formation activity three times larger than other galaxies of similar Hubble type that may have been triggered by the encounter. M99 is likely entering the Virgo Cluster for the first time bound to the periphery of the cluster at a projected separation of 3.7°, or around one megaparsec, from the cluster center at Messier 87. The galaxy is undergoing ram-pressure stripping of much of its interstellar medium as it moves through the intracluster medium.

== Supernovae and luminous red nova ==
Four supernovae have been observed in M99:

- SN 1967H (Type II, mag. 14.0) was discovered by Fritz Zwicky on 1 July 1967.
- SN 1972Q (type unknown, mag. 15.8) was discovered by Leonida Rosino on 14 December 1972.
- SN 1986I (Type II, mag. 14) was discovered by Carlton Pennypacker et al. on 17 May 1986.
- SN 2014L (Type Ic, mag. 17.2) was discovered by the THU-NAOC Transient Survey (TNTS) on 26 January 2014.

One luminous red nova has been observed in M99:

- PTF 10fqs (Type LRN, mag. 20.1) was discovered by the Palomar Transient Factory on 16 April 2010.

== See also ==
- List of Messier objects
- Messier 83 – a similar face-on spiral galaxy
- Pinwheel Galaxy – a similar face-on spiral galaxy
