= Roger Davies (astrophysicist) =

British astronomer

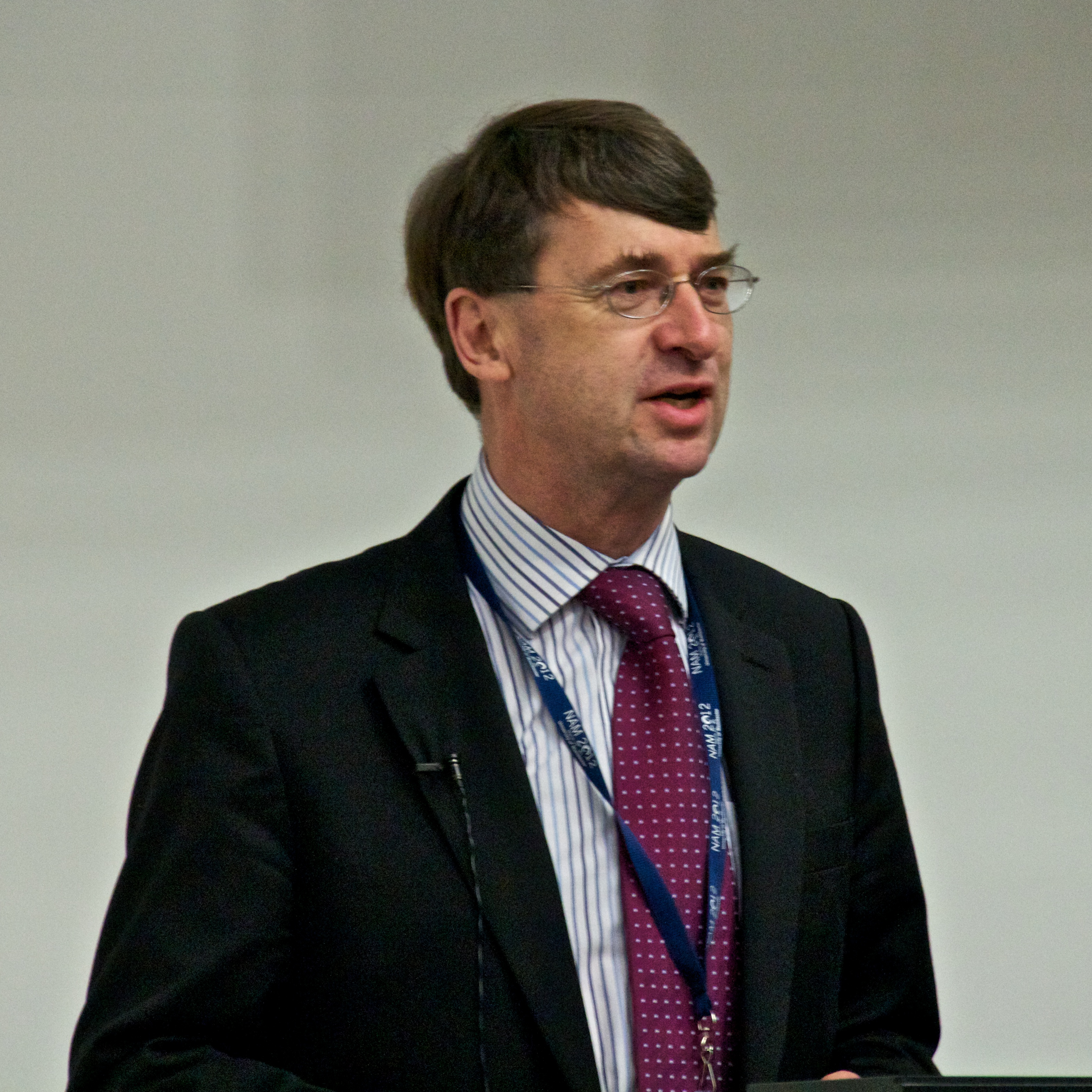
- Roger Davies presenting at the National Astronomy Meeting 2012

7th President of the European Astronomical Society
- In office 2017–2024
- Preceded by: Thierry Courvoisier
- Succeeded by: Sara Lucatello

87th President of the Royal Astronomical Society
- In office 2010–2012
- Preceded by: Andrew Fabian
- Succeeded by: David Southwood

Personal details
- Born: 13 January 1954 (age 72)
- Citizenship: United Kingdom
- Scientific career
- Education: University College London (BA); Churchill College, Cambridge (PhD)
- Thesis: The Dynamics of Elliptical Galaxies (1978)
- Doctoral advisor: C.D. Mackay
- Doctoral students: Roberto Abraham (1991); Reynier Peletier (1988)

Roger Llewelyn Davies (born 13 January 1954) is a British astronomer and cosmologist, one of the so-called Seven Samurai collaboration who discovered an apparent concentration of mass in the Universe called the Great Attractor. He is the emeritus Philip Wetton Professor of Astrophysics in the Department of Physics, Oxford University and Student of Christ Church. His research interests centre on cosmology and how galaxies form and evolve. He has a longstanding interest in astronomical instruments and telescopes and promoted the scientific case for the UK's involvement in the 8m Gemini telescopes project that constructed telescopes in Hawaii and Chile. He has pioneered the use of a new class of astronomical spectrograph to measure the masses and ages of galaxies, as well as search for black holes in their nuclei. He was the founding director of the Hintze Centre for Astrophysical Surveys.

== Career and research ==
Davies took his first degree in physics at University College London (UCL) and his PhD at the Institute of Astronomy and Churchill College, Cambridge. Posts at Lick Observatory, California, then Cambridge and Kitt Peak National Observatory, Arizona, followed. While at Kitt Peak he became part of the Seven Samurai collaboration which surveyed the distances and velocities of 400 nearby elliptical galaxies, discovering the Great Attractor, at that time thought to be pulling the Milky Way and other galaxies in the direction of the constellations of Hydra and Centaurus.

Returning to the UK, Davies was based in Oxford leading the team that developed a proposal for UK participation in an 8-m telescope project which ultimately led to the establishment of the Gemini Observatory, twin 8m telescopes in Hawaii and Chile. He became Head of Astronomy at Durham University in 1994 where he developed his interest in integral field spectroscopy and played a leading role in building instruments for Gemini (GMOS) and the William Herschel Telescope (SAURON). He used these to map the motions and composition of the gas and stars in galaxies leading to new insights into galaxy evolution and the supermassive black holes they host.

Davies returned to Oxford in 2002 as the first Philip Wetton Professor of Astrophysics (a post he held in conjunction with a Studentship at Christ Church, Oxford) to pursue research in cosmology and the evolution of galaxies. He was head of the physics department from 2005 to 2010 and head of astrophysics from 2011 to 2014. From 2014 to 2022 he was the founding director of the Oxford Hintze Centre for Astrophysical Surveys.

He is a Fellow of UCL, of the Royal Astronomical Society and of the Institute of Physics. He holds an honorary degree from University Claude Bernard in Lyon, France. He was President of the Royal Astronomical Society between 2010 and 2012, and President of the European Astronomical Society from 2017-2024. In 2021 he was awarded the Fred Hoyle Medal and Prize by the Institute of Physics for "seminal contributions to understanding the nature and evolution of early-type galaxies and developing their use as cosmological probes". He was elected to the Association of Universities for Research in Astronomy (AURA) Board of Directors in 2021.

Professional and academic associations
Preceded by Thierry Courvoisier	President of the European Astronomical Society; 2017 – 2024	Succeeded by Sara Lucatello
Incumbent
Preceded by Andrew Fabian	President of the Royal Astronomical Society; 2010 – 2012	Succeeded by David Southwood
