= Roberto Abraham =

Canadian astronomer

- Born: 12 April 1965 (age 61); Manila, Philippines
- Education: University of British Columbia
- Known for: Observational cosmology, galaxy evolution, first galaxies
- Scientific career
- Fields: Astronomy, astrophysics, cosmology
- Workplaces: University of Toronto
- Thesis: Imaging of BL Lac Objects (1992)
- Doctoral advisor: Ian M. McHardy and Roger Davies
- Website: www.astro.utoronto.ca/~abraham/Web/Welcome.html

Roberto Abraham, FRSC (born 12 Apr 1965) is a Canadian astronomer and is Professor of Astronomy at the University of Toronto and a Fellow of the Royal Society of Canada.

== Education ==
Abraham received a Bachelor of Science from the University of British Columbia in 1987 and a PhD from Oxford University in 1992, working under the supervision of Ian M. McHardy and Roger Davies.

He did post-doctoral work at the Dominion Astrophysical Observatory, the Institute of Astronomy, Cambridge and the Royal Greenwich Observatory.

== Career ==
Abraham's career has been notable for his contributions via non-parametric statistics to galaxy morphological classification, especially at high-redshift and early work on the Hubble Deep Field. He was one of the leaders of the "Gemini Deep Deep Survey" which led to several notable results on early galaxies including the evolution of elliptical galaxies and why a lot of them appear so remarkably old.

He is currently a co-principal-investigator on the Dragonfly Telephoto Array telescope, which images ultra-low surface brightness galaxies at visible wavelengths of light.

Abraham was the President of the Canadian Astronomical Society from 2016 to 2018. He currently serves the astronomical community by participating on the James Webb Space Telescope Advisory Committee and is Honorary President of the Toronto Centre of the Royal Astronomical Society of Canada.

== Awards and recognition ==
- 2005 – University of Toronto Faculty of Arts & Science Outstanding Teaching Award
- 2011 – Canadian Astronomical Society P.G. Martin
- 2015 – Fellow of the Royal Society of Canada
- 2017 – Canada Council Killam Research Fellowship
