= Dragonfly Telephoto Array =

Astronomical telescope built from multiple camera lenses

Coordinates: 32.9039°N 105.5289°W

The Dragonfly Telephoto Array is a ground-based optical telescope array developed at the Dunlap Institute for Astronomy & Astrophysics of the University of Toronto in Canada. The array uses a combination of telephoto lenses to observe extragalactic objects. Its main purpose is to take images of ultra-low surface brightness galaxies at visible wavelengths of light. It is well suited for this purpose because its lenses have specially coated optical glass that reduces scattered light.

== Design ==
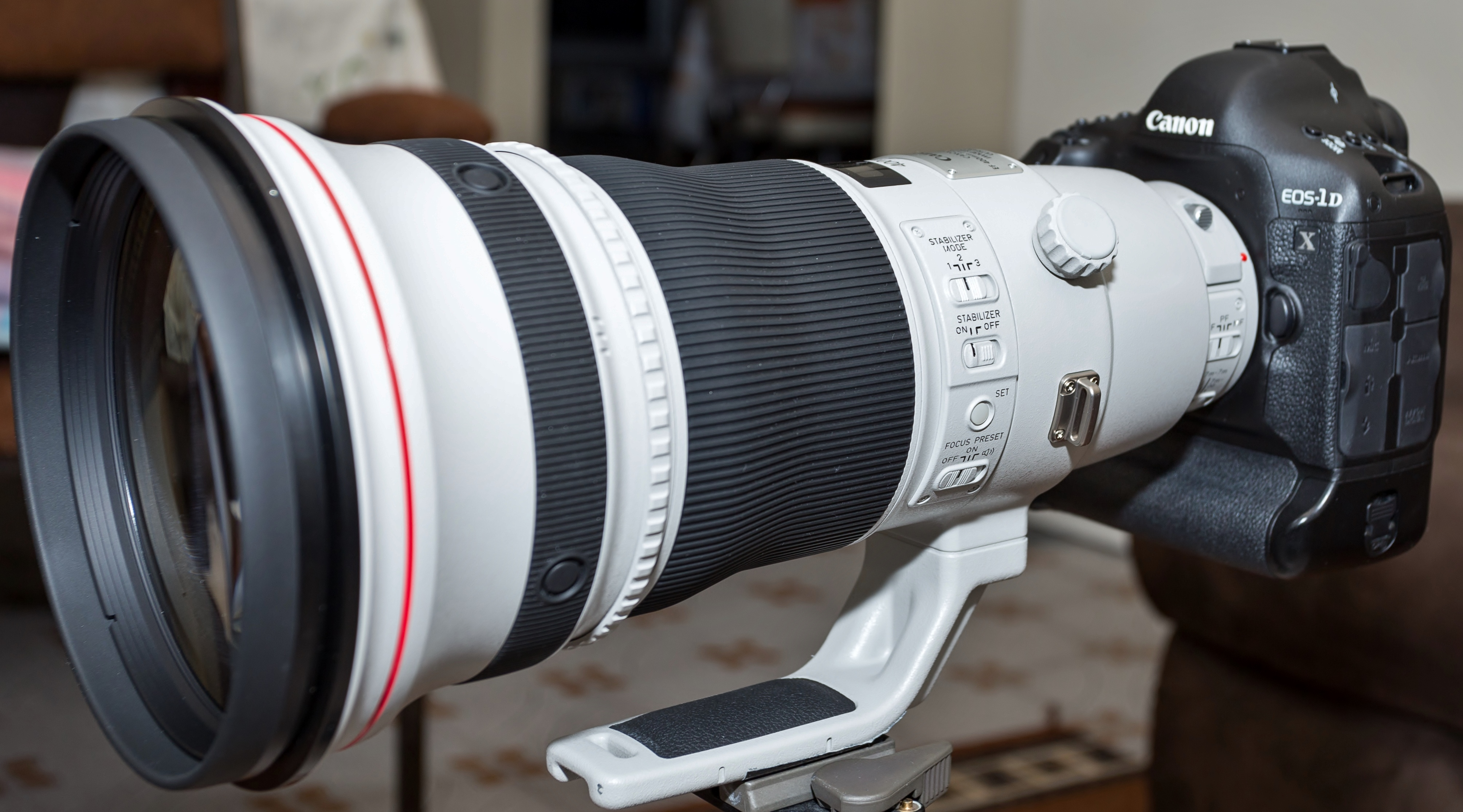
A Canon EF 400mm f/2.8L IS II USM lens, the model used in the array

The telescope was designed by Roberto Abraham of the University of Toronto and Pieter van Dokkum of Yale University. It was commissioned in 2013 and initially had eight commercially available Canon EF 400mm f/2.8L IS II USM camera lenses. This was first increased to ten lenses, and then extended to two clusters of 24 lenses each in 2016. The array is designed to accommodate the addition of lenses to increase its effective aperture with each additional lens.

With 48 lenses, the instrument has a light gathering power equivalent to a 400 mm f/0.4 lens, or a refracting telescope with an objective lens diameter of 990 mm (39 in). In March 2021 plans were announced to add 120 more lenses.

By using a lens based refractor design rather than a mirror based reflector design the telescope suffers less from issues introduced by diffraction and light scattering. Reflector designs have more light scattering due to interactions with dust and any slight roughness on the mirror. Issues with diffraction occur due to the need to place obstructions in the optical path of reflecting telescopes.

== Location ==
The Dragonfly Telephoto Array is located in the southern part of New Mexico. It is hosted at the Remote Astronomical Society Observatory of New Mexico.

== Research ==
Astronomers used the Dragonfly Telephoto Array to discover Dragonfly 44, a galaxy that is roughly as massive as the Milky Way, with 99.9% of its mass composed of dark matter. At the other end of the scale it was also used to discover NGC 1052-DF2, which measurements with other instruments initially suggested was a galaxy with very little dark matter. Further work indicated that NGC 1052-DF2 was closer to the Earth than previously thought. If this is the case then the galaxy would appear to contain a typical amount of dark matter. Though this distance debate was continued and rebutted by a follow up observation which measured the tip of the red-giant branch distance to NGC 1052-DF2 using Hubble Space Telescope, confirming the earlier surface brightness fluctuation measurements and resolving the ambiguous distance.
