= Galaxy X (galaxy) =

Dark satellite dwarf galaxy of the Milky Way Galaxy

Galaxy X is a postulated dark satellite dwarf galaxy of the Milky Way Galaxy. If it exists, it would be composed mostly of dark matter and interstellar gas with few stars. Its proposed location is some 90 kpc (290 kly) from the Sun, behind the disk of the Milky Way, and some 12 kpc (39 kly) in extent. Galactic coordinates would be (l= -27.4°,b=-1.08°).

== Discovery ==
Observational evidence for this galaxy was presented in 2015, based on the claimed discovery of four Cepheid variable stars by Sukanya Chakrabarti (RIT) and collaborators. Search for the stars was motivated by an earlier study that linked a warp in the HI (atomic hydrogen) disk of the Milky Way Galaxy to the tidal effects of a perturbing galaxy. The unseen perturber's mass was calculated to be about 1% (Note: approximately 10 billion solar masses) of that of the Milky Way, which would make it the third heaviest satellite of the Milky Way, after the Magellanic Clouds (Large Magellanic Cloud and Small Magellanic Cloud, each some 10x larger than Galaxy X). In this hypothetical model, the putative satellite galaxy would have interacted with the Milky Way some 600 million years ago, coming as close as 5–10 kpc (16–33 kly), and would now be moving away from the Milky Way.

== Name ==
The name "Galaxy X" was coined in 2011 in analogy to Planet X.

== Controversy ==
In November 2015, a group led by P. Pietrukowicz published a paper arguing against the existence of Galaxy X. These authors argued that the four stars were not actually Cepheid variable stars and that their distances might be very different than claimed in the discovery paper of Chakrabarti et al. On this basis, the authors stated that "there is no evidence for a background dwarf galaxy". However the galaxy is still regarded to exist by others, with the stars being examined to be actual Cepheids.

== List of components ==
List of claimed components of Galaxy X

Component	Type	Notes
VVV J162559.36-522234.0	Cepheid variable	about 100 million years old
VVV J162328.18-513230.4	Cepheid	about 100 million years old
VVV J162119.39-520233.3	Cepheid	about 100 million years old
VVV J161542.47-494439.0	Cepheid	about 100 million years old
