= NGC 4262 =

Galaxy in the constellation Coma Berenices

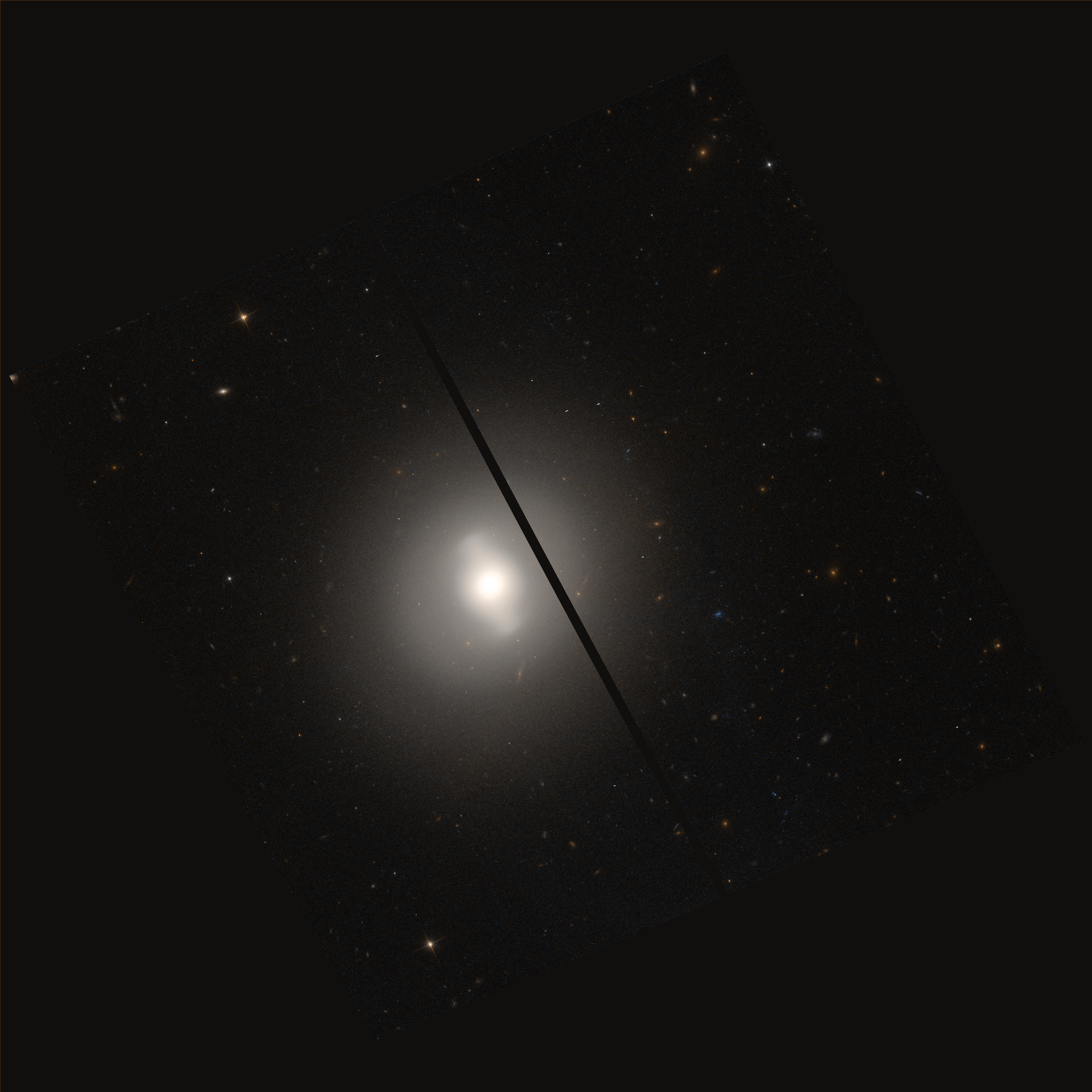
- Composite image of NGC 4262, imaged by the Hubble Space Telescope

Observation data (J2000 epoch)
- Constellation: Coma Berenices
- Right ascension: 12^{h} 19^{m} 30.6^{s}
- Declination: +14° 52′ 40″
- Redshift: 1359 ± 4 km/s
- Distance: 50.0 Mly
- Apparent magnitude (V): 12.49

Characteristics
- Type: SB(s)0^{−}
- Size: 35.7 kly (10.94 kpc)
- Apparent size (V): 1.9′ × 1.7′

Other designations
- VCC 355, 2MASS J12193058+1452396, 2MASX J12193058+1452397, WISEA J121930.57+145239.5, UGC 7365, MCG +03-31-101, PGC 39676, CGCG 1217.0+1509, CGCG 099-014, SDSS J121930.57+145239.5

NGC 4262 is a barred lenticular galaxy located in the constellation of Coma Berenices.

== Characteristics ==
NGC 4262 is a small and compact barred lenticular galaxy with a high surface brightness central bar. It is a member of the Virgo Cluster at a distance from the Milky Way of around 50 million light-years.

It features an anomalous abundance of neutral hydrogen for a lenticular galaxy, most of it being located on a ring tilted with respect to NGC 4262's galactic plane. Studies with help of the GALEX telescope have found within that ring several clusters of young stars that can be seen on ultraviolet images.

The aforementioned ring is believed to have its origin in NGC 4262 stripping some gas of another galaxy in a close passage, likely its neighbor the spiral Messier 99. NGC 4262 is thought to represent a late stage in the evolution of polar-ring galaxies.

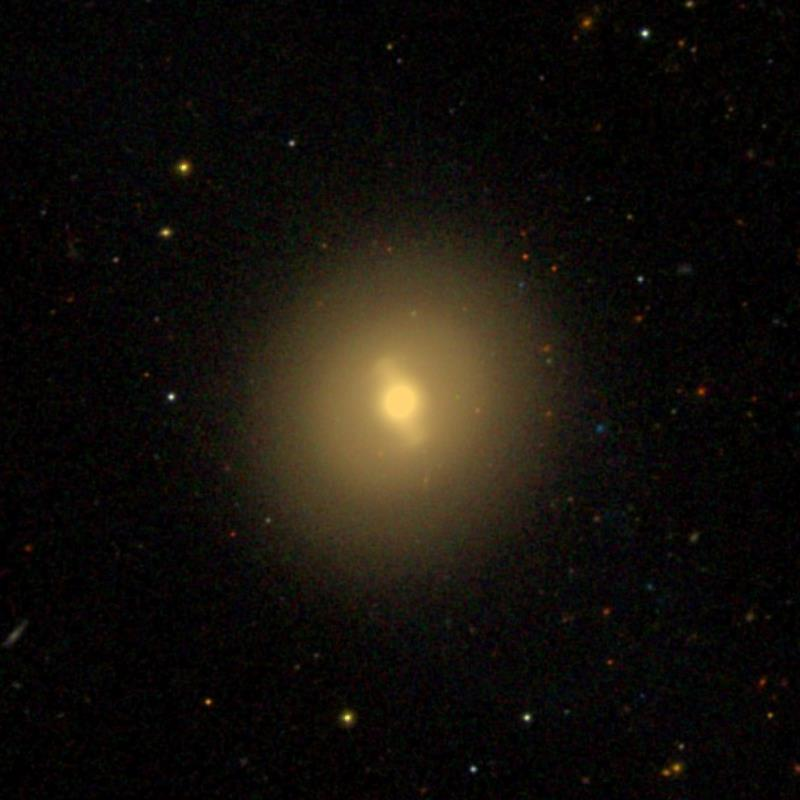
NGC 4262 (SDSS DR14)
