= Dark galaxy =

Hypothesized galaxy with no, or very few, stars

A dark galaxy is a hypothesized galaxy with dark matter but no, or very few, stars. They received their name because they have no visible stars but may be detectable if they contain significant amounts of gas. Astronomers have long theorized the existence of dark galaxies, but there are no confirmed examples to date. Dark galaxies are distinct from intergalactic gas clouds caused by galactic tidal interactions, which do not contain dark matter, so they do not technically qualify as galaxies. Distinguishing between intergalactic gas clouds and galaxies is difficult; most candidate dark galaxies turn out to be tidal gas clouds. The best candidate dark galaxies to date as of 2025 include HI1225+01, AGC229385, AC G185.0-11.5 (the most recent and promising candidate thus far), and numerous gas clouds detected in studies of quasars.

On 25 August 2016, astronomers reported that Dragonfly 44, an ultra diffuse galaxy (UDG) with the mass of the Milky Way galaxy, but with nearly no discernible stars or galactic structure, is made almost entirely of dark matter.

== Observational evidence ==
Large surveys with sensitive but low-resolution radio telescopes like Arecibo or the Parkes Telescope look for 21-cm emission from atomic hydrogen in galaxies. These surveys are then matched to optical surveys to identify any objects with no optical counterpart—that is, sources with no stars. Thus, atomic hydrogen observed by radio telescopes, within an identifiable compact object—without the presence of molecular gas or optical counterpart—suggests that the compact object is bound together by the gravitational field of an otherwise invisible dark matter cloud.

Another way astronomers search for dark galaxies is to look for hydrogen absorption lines in the spectra of background quasars. This technique has revealed many intergalactic clouds of hydrogen, but following up on candidate dark galaxies is difficult, since these sources tend to be too far away and are often optically drowned out by the bright light from the quasars.

== Nature ==
=== Origin ===
In 2005, astronomers discovered the gas cloud VIRGOHI21. They attempted to determine what it is, and why it exerts such a massive gravitational pull on the galaxy NGC 4254. After years of ruling out other possible explanations, some have concluded that VIRGOHI21 is a dark galaxy.

=== Size ===
The actual size of dark galaxies is unknown because they cannot be observed with normal telescopes. Rough estimations have ranged from double the size of the Milky Way to the size of a small quasar.

=== Structure ===
Dark galaxies are theoretically composed of dark matter, hydrogen, and dust. Some scientists support the idea that dark galaxies may contain stars. Yet the exact composition of dark galaxies remains unknown because there is no conclusive way to identify them. Nevertheless, astronomers estimate that the mass of the gas in these galaxies is approximately one billion Solar masses.

=== Methodology ===
Dark galaxies contain no visible stars and are invisible to optical telescopes. The Arecibo Galaxy Environment Survey (AGES) harnessed the Arecibo radio telescope to search for dark galaxies, which are predicted to contain detectable amounts of neutral hydrogen. The Arecibo radio telescope was useful where others are not because of its ability to detect the emission from this neutral hydrogen, specifically the 21-cm line.

=== Alternative theories ===
Scientists say that the galaxies we see today only began to create stars after dark galaxies. Based on numerous scientific assertions, dark galaxies played a big role in many of the galaxies astronomers and scientists see today. Martin Haehnel, from Kavli Institute for Cosmology at the University of Cambridge, claims that the precursor to the Milky Way galaxy was actually a much smaller bright galaxy that had merged with dark galaxies nearby to form the Milky Way we currently see. Multiple scientists agree that dark galaxies are building blocks of modern galaxies. Sebastian Cantalupo of the University of California, Santa Cruz, agrees with this theory. He goes on to say, "In our current theory of galaxy formation, we believe that big galaxies form from the merger of smaller galaxies. Dark galaxies bring to big galaxies a lot of gas, which then accelerates star formation in the bigger galaxies." Scientists have specific techniques they use to locate these dark galaxies. These techniques have the capability of teaching us more about other special events that occur in the universe; for instance, the cosmic web. This "web" is made of invisible filaments of gas and dark matter believed to permeate the universe, as well as "feeding and building galaxies and galaxy clusters where the filaments intersect."

== Potential dark galaxies ==
=== FAST J0139+4328 ===
Located 94 million light years away from Earth in the constellation Andromeda, this galaxy is visible in radio waves with minimal visible light.

=== HE0450-2958 ===
HE0450-2958 is a quasar at redshift z=0.285. Hubble Space Telescope images showed that the quasar is located at the edge of a large cloud of gas, but no host galaxy was detected for the quasar. The authors of the Hubble study suggested that one possible scenario was that the quasar is located in a dark galaxy. However, subsequent analysis by other groups found no evidence that the host galaxy is anomalously dark, and demonstrated that a normal host galaxy is probably present, so the observations do not support the dark galaxy interpretation.

=== HVC 127-41-330 ===
HVC 127-41-330 is a cloud rotating at high speed between Andromeda and the Triangulum Galaxy. Astronomer Josh Simon considers this cloud to be a dark galaxy because of the speed of its rotation and its predicted mass.

=== J0613+52 ===
J0613+52 is a possible dark galaxy, discovered with the Green Bank Telescope when it was accidentally pointed to the wrong coordinates. Stars could possibly exist within it, but were not observed as of January 2024.

=== Nube ===
Nube was discovered in 2023 by analyzing deep optical imagery of an area in Stripe 82. Due to its low surface brightness, Nube is classified as an "almost dark galaxy."

=== Smith's Cloud ===
Smith's Cloud is a candidate to be a dark galaxy, due to its projected mass and survival of encounters with the Milky Way.

=== VIRGOHI21 ===
Initially discovered in 2000, VIRGOHI21 was announced in February 2005 as a good candidate to be a true dark galaxy. It was detected in 21-cm surveys, and was suspected to be a possible cosmic partner to the galaxy NGC 4254. This unusual-looking galaxy appears to be one partner in a cosmic collision, and appeared to show dynamics consistent with a dark galaxy (and apparently inconsistent with the predictions of the Modified Newtonian Dynamics (MOND) theory). However, further observations revealed that VIRGOHI21 was an intergalactic gas cloud, stripped from NGC4254 by a high speed collision. The high speed interaction was caused by infall into the Virgo Cluster.

=== CDG-2 ===
In June 2025, astronomers reported CDG-2, another ultra diffuse galaxy with only four galactic clusters in it, was also made almost entirely of dark matter.

== See also ==
- Dark matter – Hypothetical invisible cosmic material
- Dark matter halo – Theoretical cosmological structure
- Dwarf spheroidal galaxy – Low-luminosity galaxy of old stars and little dust
- Low-surface-brightness galaxy – Galaxy which is less bright than the ambient night sky
- Ultra diffuse galaxy – Extremely low luminosity galaxy
- Ultra faint dwarf galaxies – the most dark matter-dominated systems known
- Galaxy X (galaxy) – Dark satellite dwarf galaxy of the Milky Way Galaxy
