= Ultra diffuse galaxy =

Extremely low luminosity galaxy

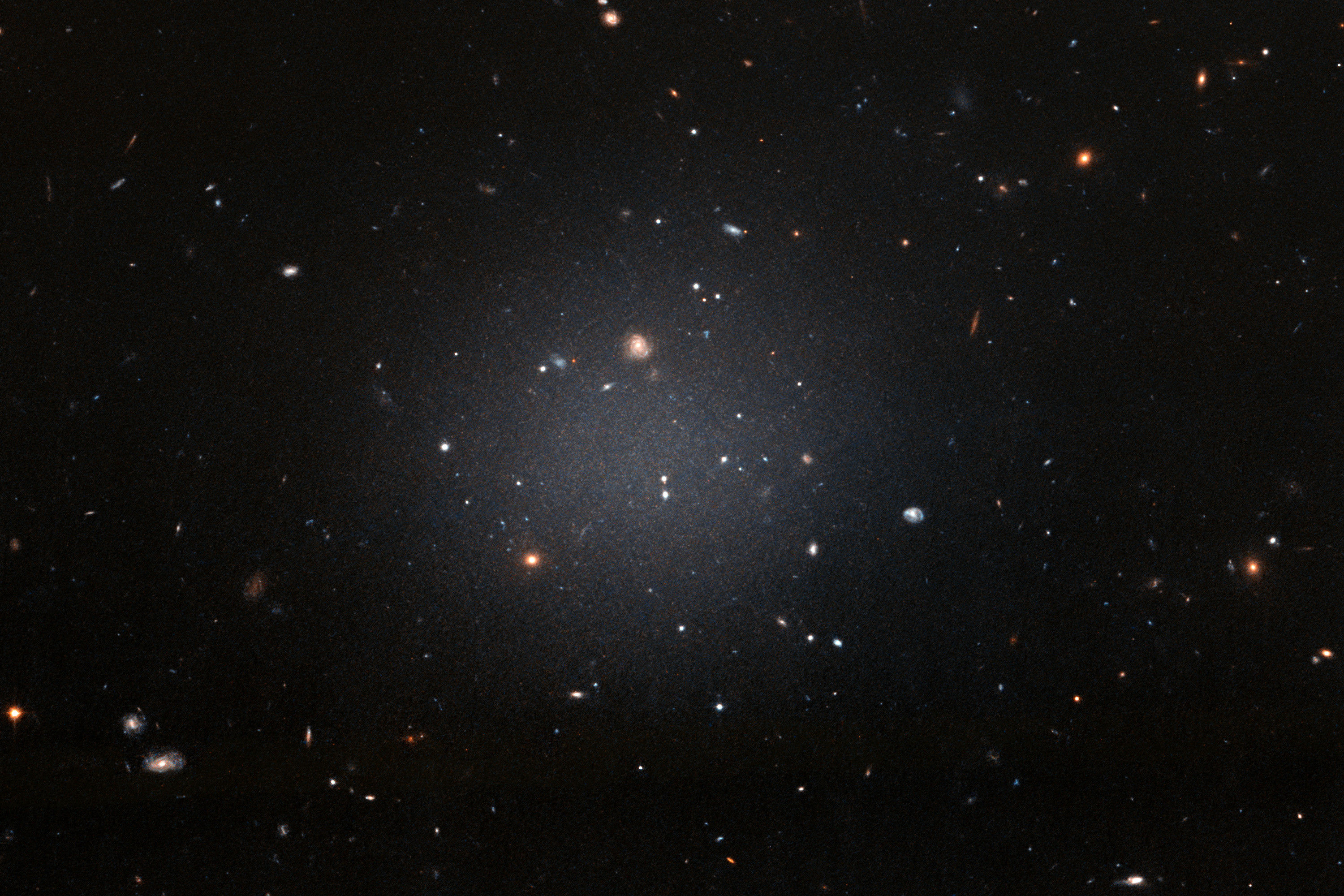
NGC 1052-DF2, an ultra diffuse galaxy.

An ultra diffuse galaxy (UDG), or dark galaxy, is an extremely low luminosity galaxy, the first example of which was discovered in the nearby Virgo Cluster by Allan Sandage and Bruno Binggeli in 1984. (Note: UDGs are a subset of dwarf spheroidals and dwarf ellipticals and as such are a redundant name for an already well studied galaxy type.) These galaxies have been studied for many years prior to their renaming in 2015. Their lack of luminosity is due to the lack of star-forming gas, which results in these galaxies being reservoirs of very old stellar populations. These galaxies with lower luminosity are more likely to be found in clusters, such as the Coma Cluster, than in groups. Ultra diffuse galaxies have a similar size to the Milky Way, but they have masses more akin to dwarf galaxies. The formation of ultra diffuse galaxies is still debated, however they're thought to have formed from the earliest galaxy mergers or tidal forces. Structural analysis of their photometric scaling relations shows that UDGs form a continuous parameter sequence extending dwarf and ordinary early-type galaxies to lower luminosities and surface brightnesses rather than constituting a physically distinct class of galaxies.

== Characteristics ==
Utilizing the Dark Energy Survey, a new detection model (UDGnet-DES) was able to detect UDG candidates based on the morphological characteristics (more disk-shaped / elongated ellipse) of UDGs. The model found that UDGs can be categorized into two color types: There are blue UDGs with a color index (g-i) less than 0.6, and there are red UDGs with a color index (g-i) greater than 0.6. The model also found that, when it comes to a UDGs effective surface brightness, blue UDGs tend to have a higher surface brightness than that of red UDGs. The average surface brightness of this study was found to be 25 mag arcsec^{−2}.

Based on discoveries confirmed in 2018, this class of galaxies includes both extremes of dark matter content: Some UDGs consist almost entirely of dark matter (such a galaxy may have the same size and mass as the Milky Way but a visible star count of only 1%), while other UDGs appear to be almost entirely free of dark matter. More recently (2025), suggestions that UDGs typically have more dark matter content than typical dwarf galaxies have been proposed.

== Examples ==
Some ultra diffuse galaxies found in the Coma Cluster, about 330 million light years from Earth, have diameters of 60 kly (18 kpc) with 1% of the stars of the Milky Way Galaxy. The distribution of ultra diffuse galaxies in the Coma Cluster is the same as luminous galaxies; this suggests that the cluster environment strips the gas from the galaxies, while allowing them to populate the cluster the same as more luminous galaxies. The similar distribution in the higher tidal force zones suggests a larger dark matter fraction to hold the galaxies together under the higher stress.

Dragonfly 44, an ultra diffuse galaxy in the Coma Cluster, is one example. It was first discovered by the Coma Cluster survey which specifically scanned for very low surface brightness objects via the multi beam optical Dragonfly Telephoto Array. Observations of its rotational speed suggest a mass of about one trillion solar masses, about the same as the mass of the Milky Way. This is also consistent with about 90 globular clusters observed around Dragonfly 44. However, the galaxy emits only 1% of the light emitted by the Milky Way. On 25 August 2016, astronomers reported that Dragonfly 44 may be made almost entirely of dark matter. However, later, spatially resolved kinematics measured a mass of about 160 billion solar mass, six times less than early mass measurements and 1 order of magnitude less than the Milky Way mass. Dragonfly 44 is one of the most metal-poor ultra diffuse galaxies known, with measurements of globular clusters in the Milky Way and M87 galaxies showing that stellar populations in the inner core of Dragonfly 44 are similar to metal-poor globular clusters. The most recent work found 20 globular clusters around the galaxy, which is consistent with the recent mass measurement. The lack of X-ray emissions from the galaxy and surrounding area also show that the number of globular clusters can not be as many as was claimed before.A 2024 UDG globular cluster study proposes that UDGs with stellar masses below 200 million times the mass of the sun will have a globular cluster count between 0-13, while UDGs with stellar masses above that point can have a count between 13-38. However, the study also found that UDGs in lower density environments will have a higher frequency of globular clusters than UDGs in higher density environments. The main theory behind this occurrence is that the UDGs in low density environments have not undergone major mergers, so their globular cluster populations remain intact while the high-density environment counterparts have undergone major mergers. However, there are high uncertainties with this claim due to low statistics, so more data collection than that of the MATLAS survey used in the study would be needed.

In 2018, the same authors reported the discovery that the ultra diffuse galaxy NGC 1052-DF2 (Note: NGC 1052-DF2 had previously been identified on photographic plates by Karachentsev et al. in 2000.) is dark matter-free, based on velocity measurements of its ~10 globular cluster system. They concluded that this may rule out some alternative gravity theories like modified Newtonian dynamics (MOND), unless one takes its external field effect into account. Detailed simulations in the framework of MOND confirm that NGC 1052-DF2 is quite consistent with theoretical expectations.

In 2021, AGC 114905, an ultra-diffuse dwarf galaxy about 250 million light-years away, was reported to have almost no dark matter. However, this conclusion relies heavily on the galaxy having a moderate inclination of 32° between disc and sky planes, which is estimated from the somewhat oval appearance. Using detailed simulations of AGC 114905 in the alternative gravity theory known as Modified Newtonian Dynamics, it was shown that a disc galaxy with its properties can appear slightly oval even if viewed face-on due to disc self-gravity, in which case the rotation curve could be much lower and the galaxy could be quite consistent with theoretical expectations. An overestimated inclination is unlikely if galaxies are dominated by dark matter because then the disc is not self-gravitating, so it should be close to circular when viewed face-on.

The first large-scale 2D velocity map of UDGs and LSBs was conducted in 2025 on the Hydra-1 cluster. The study found that UDGs tend to either not rotate or rotate slowly, with a change in velocity ~25-40 km/s. For five of those galaxies, they're believed to be rotationally supported, meaning they are only able to rotate about one axis and not rotate in other axes. From this study, two different rotational classes of the UDGs and LSBs in Hydra-1 were proposed (rotating and non-rotating). However, this breakthrough velocity data still doesn't narrow down the exact origins of the formation of UDGs and is still being debated.

Another example of a UDG is the galaxy Zangetsu. It is a UDG that was discovered recently and seems to be unusually asymmetrical, meaning that it has a slightly elongated shape and that its morphological properties are not consistent across itself. Zangetsu appears to not belong to any galaxy cluster, making it an isolated galaxy. Because of measurements on its surface brightness, its light profile, its optical color, and its SED, Zangetsu is believed to be a quiescent galaxy as well. The discovery and observation of Zangetsu’s properties has proved to challenge the current theory of how UDGs form.

== See also ==
- Dark galaxy – Hypothesized galaxy with no, or very few, stars
- Ultra faint dwarf galaxies – the most dark matter-dominated systems known
- Low-surface-brightness galaxy, also known as LSBG – Galaxy which is less bright than the ambient night sky
- Type-cD galaxy – Galaxy morphology classification or c-Diffuse galaxy type
- Type-D galaxy – System for categorizing galaxies based on appearance or Diffuse-type galaxy
- Globular cluster – Spherical collection of stars – used to trace dark matter halos in UDGs
- Dark matter halo – Theoretical cosmological structure
- DGSAT I – Ultra diffuse galaxy in the Perseus–Pisces Supercluster
- Galaxy cluster – Astronomical structure
