= Low surface brightness galaxy =

Galaxy which is less bright than the ambient night sky

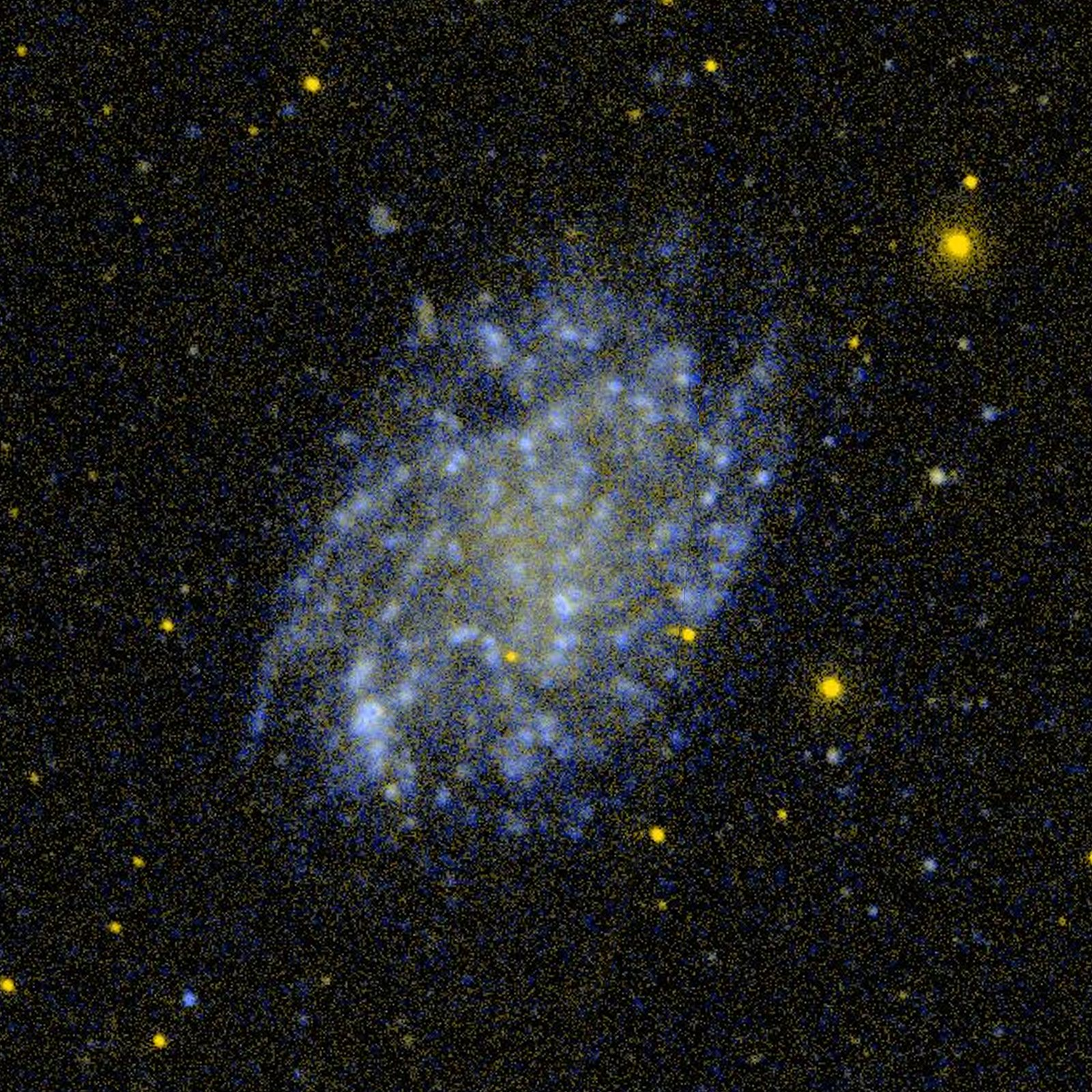
An image of NGC 45, a low surface brightness spiral galaxy, by GALEX.

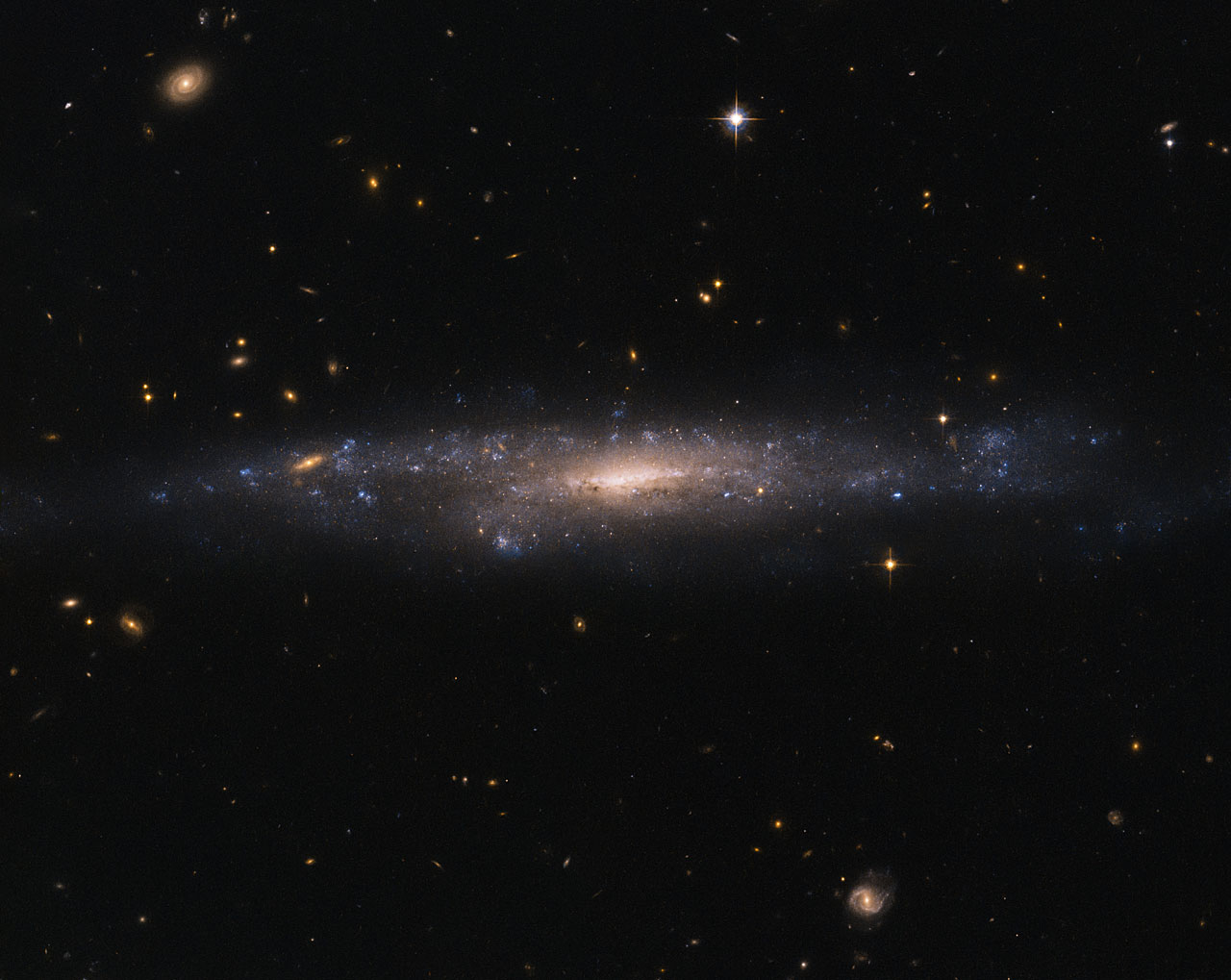
UGC 477 is located over 110 million light-years away in the constellation of Pisces.

A low-surface-brightness galaxy, or LSB galaxy, is a diffuse galaxy with a surface brightness that, when viewed from Earth, is at least one magnitude lower than the ambient night sky.

Most LSBs are dwarf galaxies, and most of their baryonic matter is in the form of neutral gaseous hydrogen, rather than stars. They appear to have over 95% of their mass as non-baryonic dark matter. There appears to be little supernova (SN) activity in these galaxies, although LSB galaxy IC 217 hosted 2014cl.

Rotation curve measurements indicate an extremely high mass-to-light ratio, meaning that stars and luminous gas contribute only very little to the overall mass balance of an LSB. The centers of LSBs show no large overdensities in stars, unlike e.g. the bulges of normal spiral galaxies. Therefore, they seem to be dark-matter-dominated even in their centers, which makes them excellent laboratories for the study of dark matter.

In comparison to the high-surface-brightness galaxies, LSBs are mainly isolated field galaxies, found in regions devoid of other galaxies. In their past, they had fewer tidal interactions or mergers with other galaxies, which could have triggered enhanced star formation. This is an explanation for the small stellar content.

LSB galaxies were theorized to exist in 1976 by Mike Disney.

== Giant low-surface-brightness galaxies ==
Giant low surface brightness (GLSB) galaxies are among the most massive known spiral galaxies in the Universe. They have very faint stellar disks that are very rich in neutral hydrogen but low in star formation and thus low in surface brightness. Such galaxies often have bright bulges that can host low luminosity active galactic nuclei. GLSB galaxies are usually isolated systems that rarely interact with other galaxies. The first LSB galaxy verified to exist was Malin 1, discovered in 1986. As such, it was also the first giant LSB galaxy identified. At the time of its discovery, it was the largest spiral galaxy known (by scale-length measurement).

UGC 1382 was previously thought to be an elliptical galaxy, but low-brightness spiral arms were later detected. UGC 1382 is much closer to Earth than Malin 1.

== Examples ==
- Andromeda V
- Pegasus Dwarf Spheroidal Galaxy
- IC 10
- NGC 45
- Eridanus II
- Malin 1
- Malin 2
- Phoenix Dwarf
- Sagittarius Dwarf Irregular Galaxy (SagDIG)
- Sextans A
- Sextans B
- Wolf–Lundmark–Melotte galaxy (WLM)
- UGC 477

== See also ==
- Ultra diffuse galaxy
