= NGC 1084 =

Galaxy in the constellation Eridanus

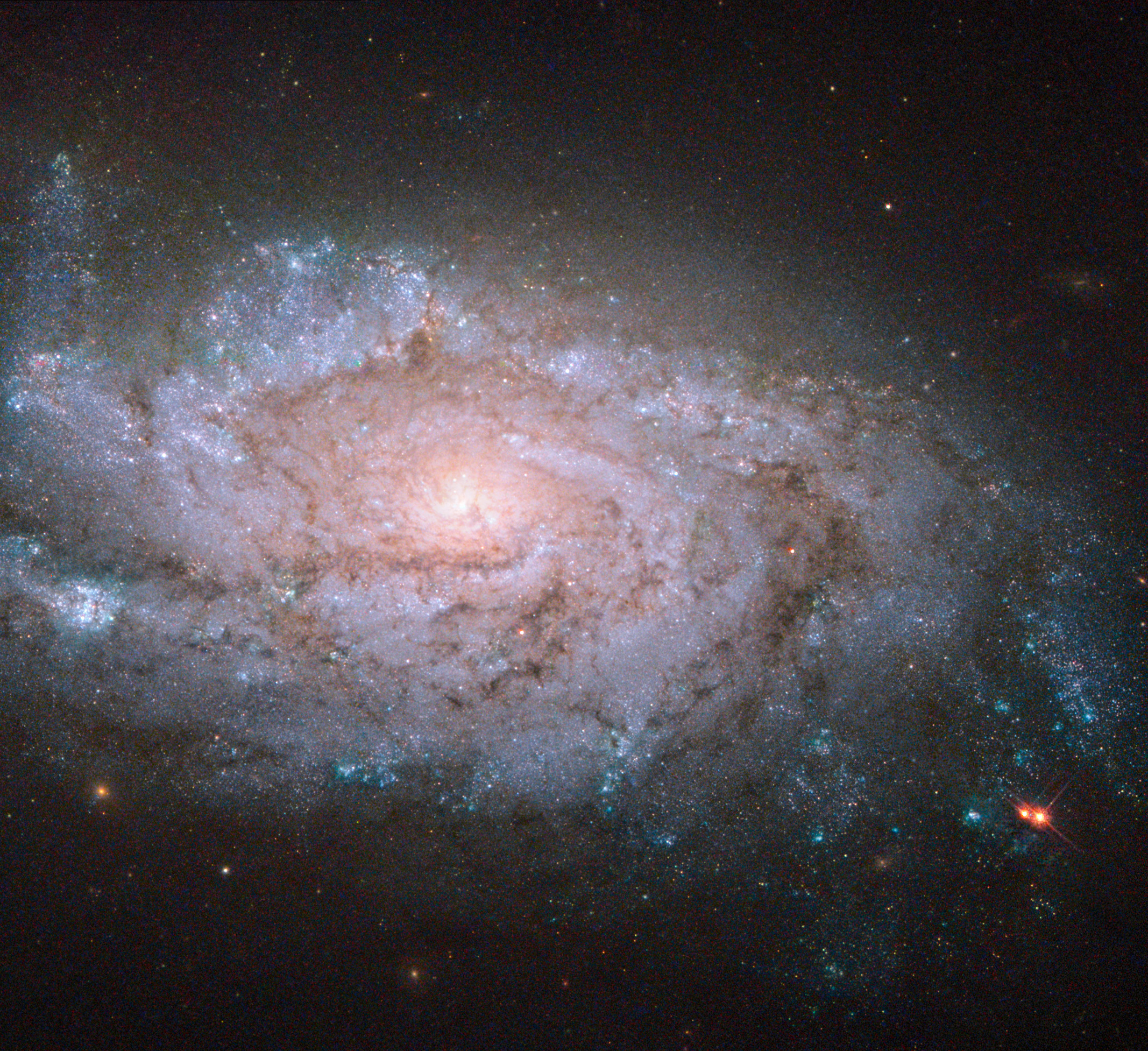
- NGC 1084 imaged by the Hubble Space Telescope in 2001

Observation data (J2000 epoch)
- Constellation: Eridanus
- Right ascension: 02^{h} 45^{m} 59.926^{s}
- Declination: −07° 34′ 43.10″
- Redshift: 1,406 km/s
- Distance: 62.7 Mly (19.23 Mpc)
- Apparent magnitude (V): 10.7

Characteristics
- Type: SAc
- Apparent size (V): 2.8′ × 1.4′

Other designations
- LEDA 10464, MCG -01-08-007, PGC 10464

NGC 1084 is an unbarred spiral galaxy in the constellation Eridanus. It is located at a distance of about 63 million light-years away from the Milky Way. The galaxy was discovered by William Herschel on 10 January 1785. It has multiple spiral arms, which are not well defined. It belongs in the same galaxy group with NGC 988, NGC 991, NGC 1022, NGC 1035, NGC 1042, NGC 1047, NGC 1052 and NGC 1110. This group is in turn associated with the Messier 77 group.

Star formation in the galaxy is chaotic and not confined to the spiral arms, but the rate is not high enough to classify it as a starburst galaxy. Star formation has taken place in small bursts in the last 40 million years. The cause of this activity has been proposed as a merger with a gas-rich dwarf galaxy. A radio source has been detected 3.5' south-west of the galaxy, connected to it by a bridge.

== Supernovae ==
Five supernovae have been observed in NGC 1084:

- SN 1963P (Type Ia, mag. 14.5) was discovered by Paul Wild on 18 September 1963.
- SN 1996an (Type II, mag. 14) was discovered by Masakatsu Aoki on 27 July 1996.
- SN 1998dl (Type II, mag. 16) was discovered by the Lick Observatory Supernova Search (LOSS) on 20 August 1998.
- SN 2009H (Type II, mag. 17.4) was discovered by the Lick Observatory Supernova Search (LOSS) on 2 January 2009.
- SN 2012ec (Type II-P, mag. 14.5) was discovered by Berto Monard on 11 August 2012.

== Gallery ==
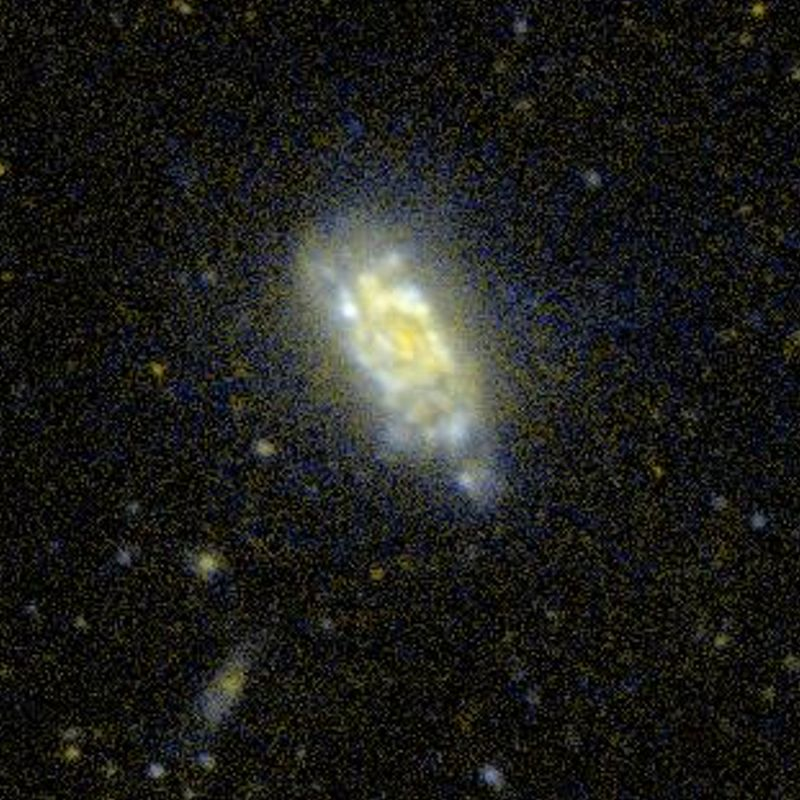
GALEX

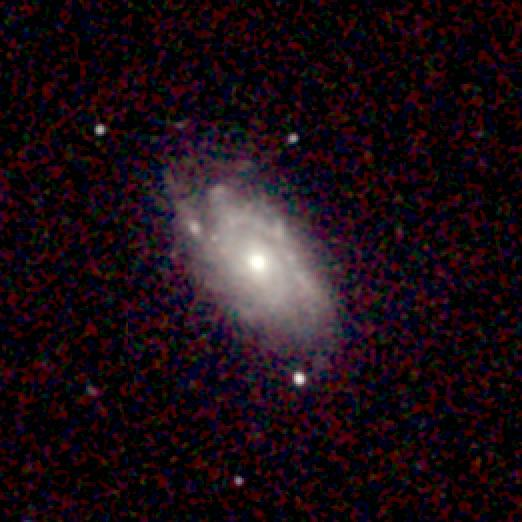
NGC 1084 by 2MASS

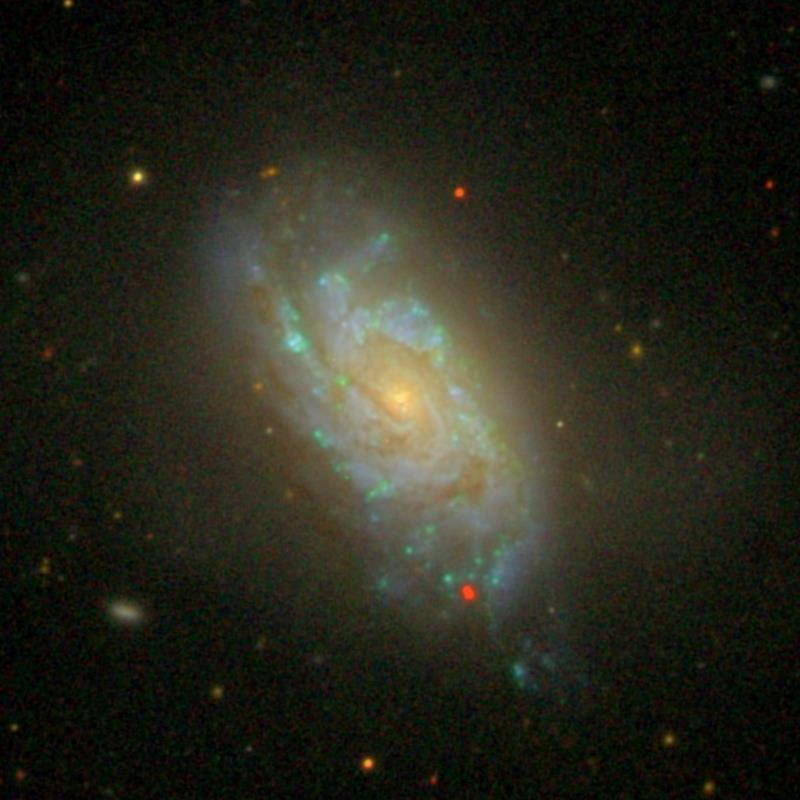
SDSS

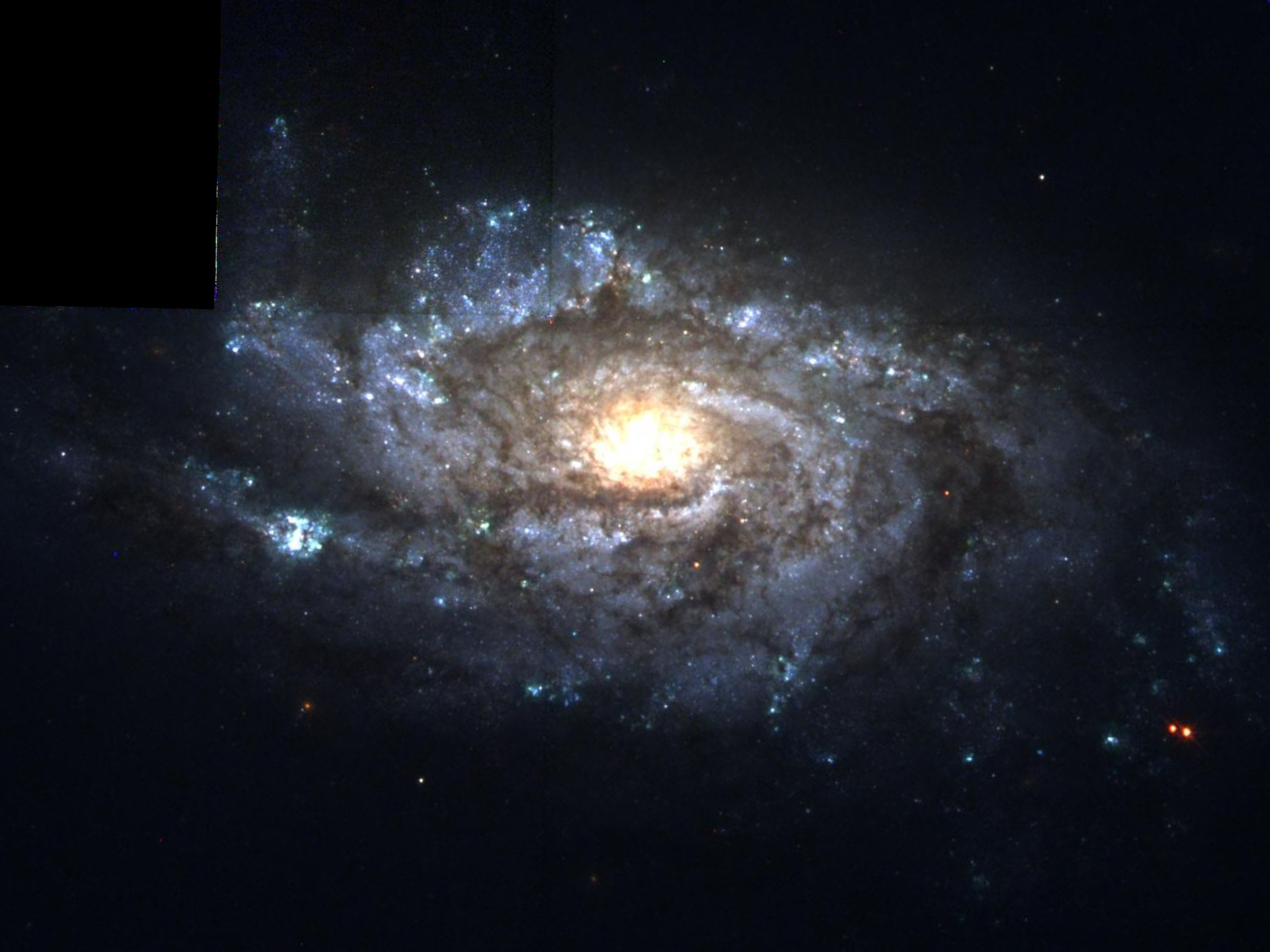
NGC 1084 by the Hubble Space Telescope

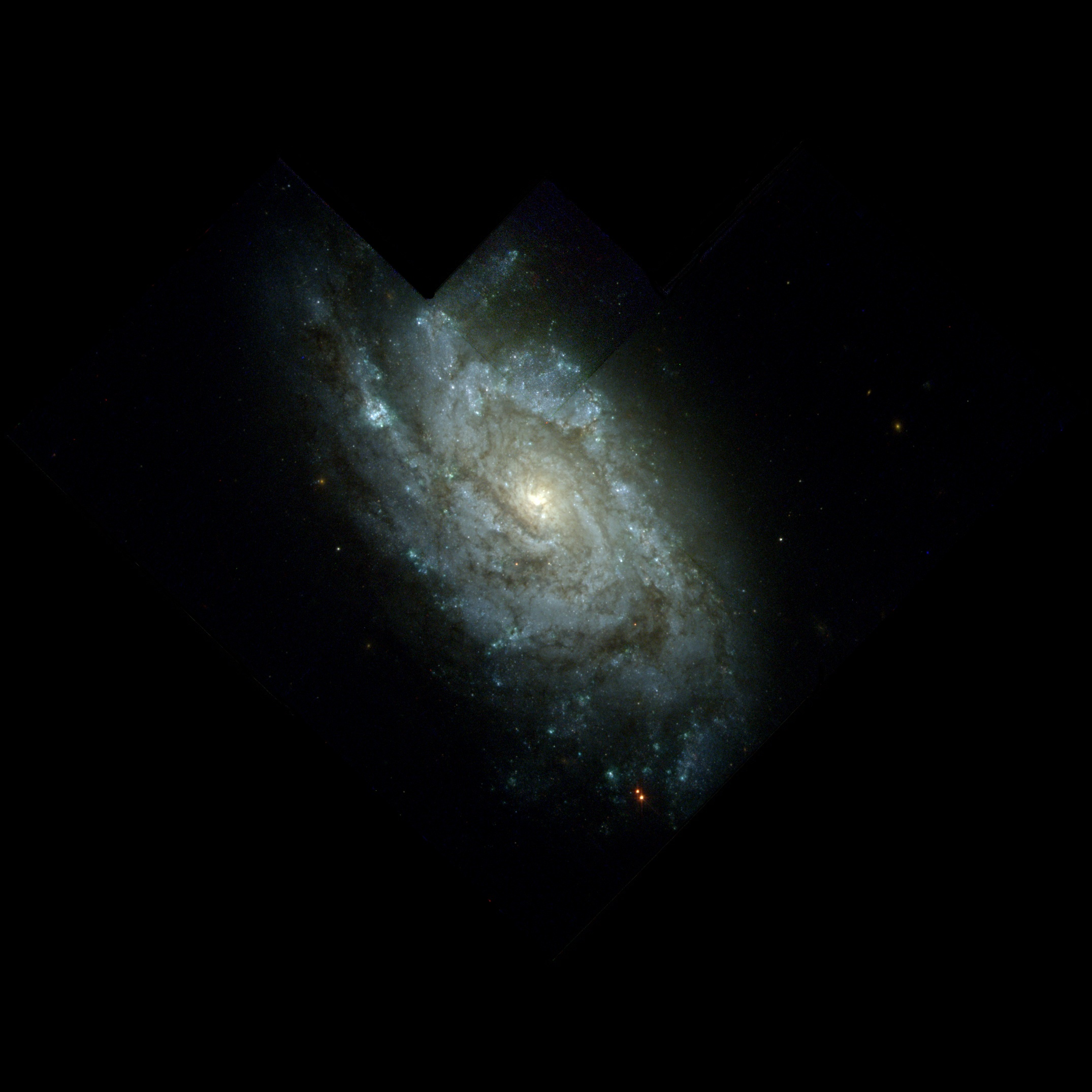
Hubble Space Telescope image of NGC 1084.

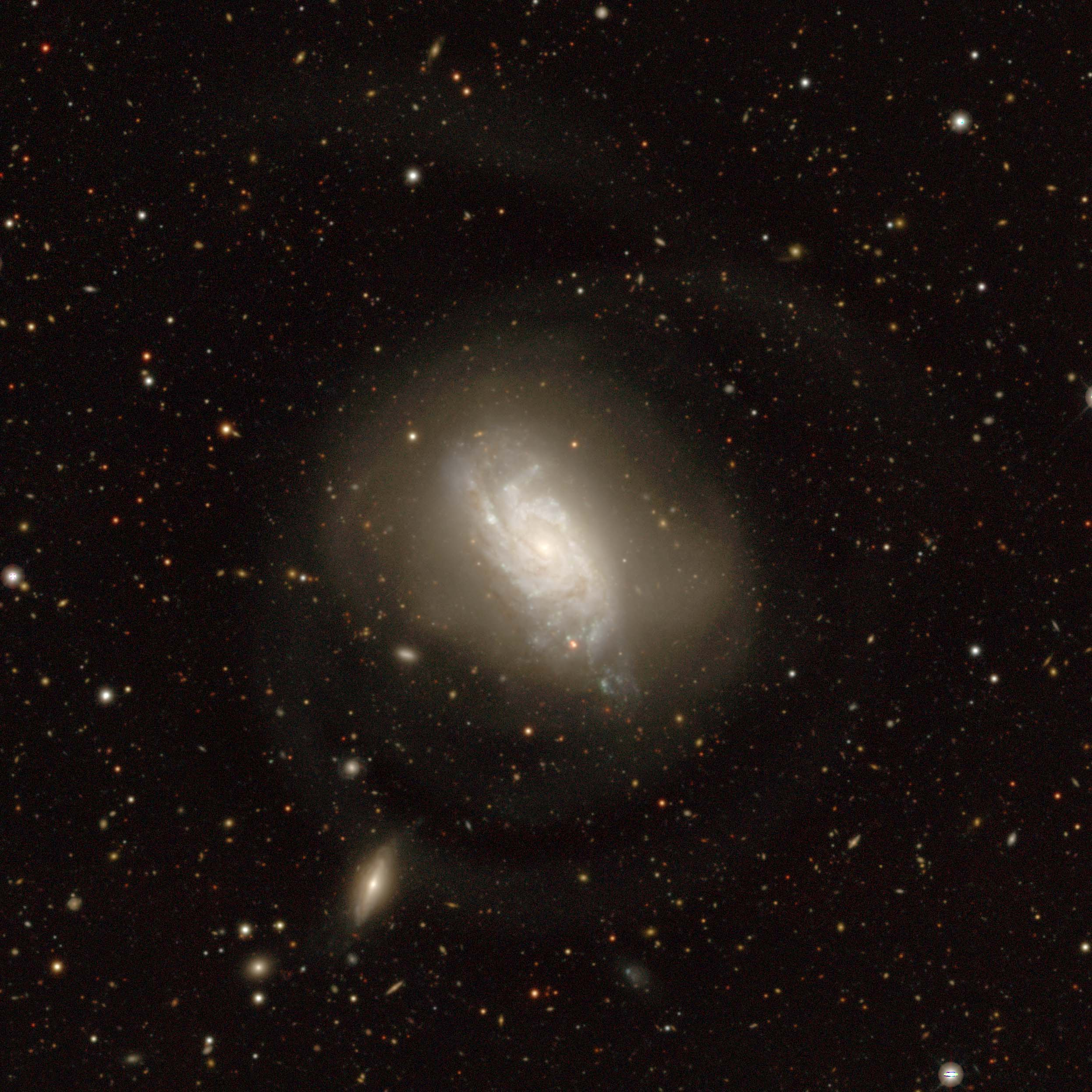
The galaxy as imaged by the Legacy surveys, showing the tidal structures of NGC 1084
