= NGC 988 =

Galaxy in the constellation Cetus

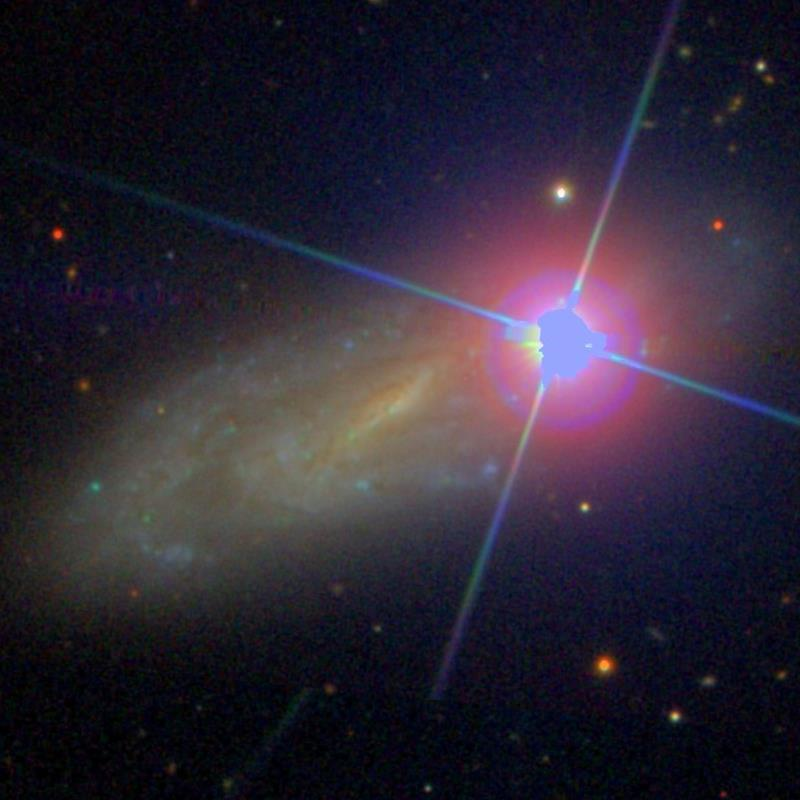
- SDSS image of NGC 988

Observation data (J2000 epoch)
- Constellation: Cetus
- Right ascension: 02^{h} 35^{m} 27.7437^{s}
- Declination: −09° 21′ 21.927″
- Redshift: 0.005075
- Distance: 50.0 ± 10.9 Mly (15.33 ± 3.35 Mpc)
- Apparent magnitude (V): 11.0

Characteristics
- Type: SB(s)cd
- Apparent size (V): 4.6′ × 2.5′

Other designations
- IRAS 02330-0934, 2MASX J02352772-0921216, UGCA 35, MCG -02-07-037, PGC 9843

NGC 988 is a spiral galaxy located in the constellation Cetus. It lies at a distance of 50 million light years from Earth, which, given its apparent dimensions, means that NGC 988 is about 75,000 light years across. The magnitude 7.1 star HD 16152 is superposed 52" northwest of the center of NGC 988. The galaxy was discovered by Édouard Jean-Marie Stephan in 1880. One ultraluminous X-ray source has been detected in NGC 988.

NGC 988 is the brightest galaxy in NGC 1052 group (also known as NGC 988 group), which includes the galaxies NGC 991, NGC 1022, NGC 1035, NGC 1042, NGC 1047, NGC 1051, NGC 1052, NGC 1084, and NGC 1110. It belongs in the same galaxy cloud as Messier 77.

== Supernova ==
One supernova has been observed in NGC 988:

- SN 2017gmr (Type II, mag. 15.1187) was discovered by the Distance Less Than 40 Mpc Survey (DLT40) on 4 September 2017.
