= NGC 1048 =

Lenticular galaxy

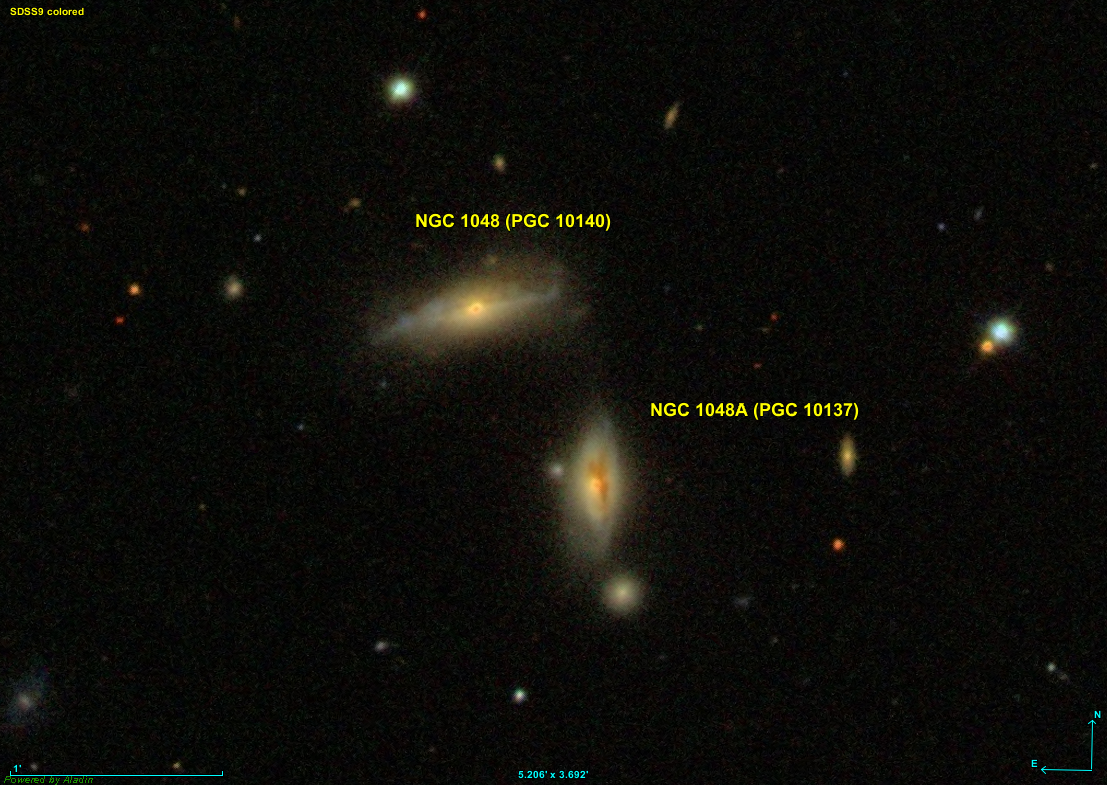
- NGC 1048, LEDA 10137 & LEDA 1002216

Observation data
- Constellation: Cetus
- Right ascension: 02^{h} 40^{m} 37.9^{s}
- Declination: −08° 32′ 00″
- Redshift: 0.038713 ± 0.00001
- Heliocentric radial velocity: (11.606 ± 3)
- Apparent magnitude (V): 14.6
- Apparent magnitude (B): 15.5

Characteristics
- Type: S0+? / LINER

NGC 1048 is a lenticular galaxy with an active galactic nucleus of Hubble type SB0/a in the constellation Cetus south of the ecliptic. It is estimated to be located at a distance of 518 million light years from the Milky Way and has a diameter of around 150'000 light years. Together with PGC10137 it forms a gravitationally bound galaxy pair.

In the night sky it appears next to other galaxies such as NGC 1033, NGC 1042, NGC 1047, and NGC 1052.

This object was discovered by Lewis A. Swift on 10 November 1885.

== See also ==
- SIMBAD Astronomical Database
- CDS Portal
