= NGC 939 =

Elliptical or lenticular galaxy in the constellation Eridanus

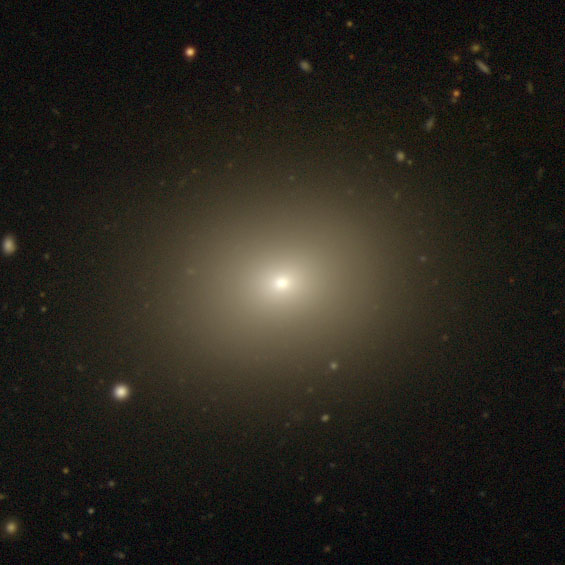
- DECam image of NGC 939

Observation data (J2000 epoch)
- Constellation: Eridanus
- Right ascension: 02^{h} 26^{m} 21.312^{s}
- Declination: −44° 26′ 46.08″
- Redshift: 0.017186
- Heliocentric radial velocity: 5108 km/s
- Distance: 241.4 ± 17.0 Mly (74.01 ± 5.22 Mpc)
- Apparent magnitude (B): 14.06

Characteristics
- Type: S0/a/E

Other designations
- MCG -07-06-004, PGC 9271

NGC 939 is a lenticular or elliptical galaxy in the constellation Eridanus. It is estimated to be 241 million light-years from the Milky Way and has a diameter of approximately 80,000 ly. NGC 939 was discovered on October 18, 1835 by astronomer John Herschel.

NGC 939 is better seen from the southern hemisphere because of its location south of the celestial equator.

== See also ==
- List of NGC objects (1–1000)
