= NGC 2809 =

Galaxy in the constellation Cancer

NGC 2807
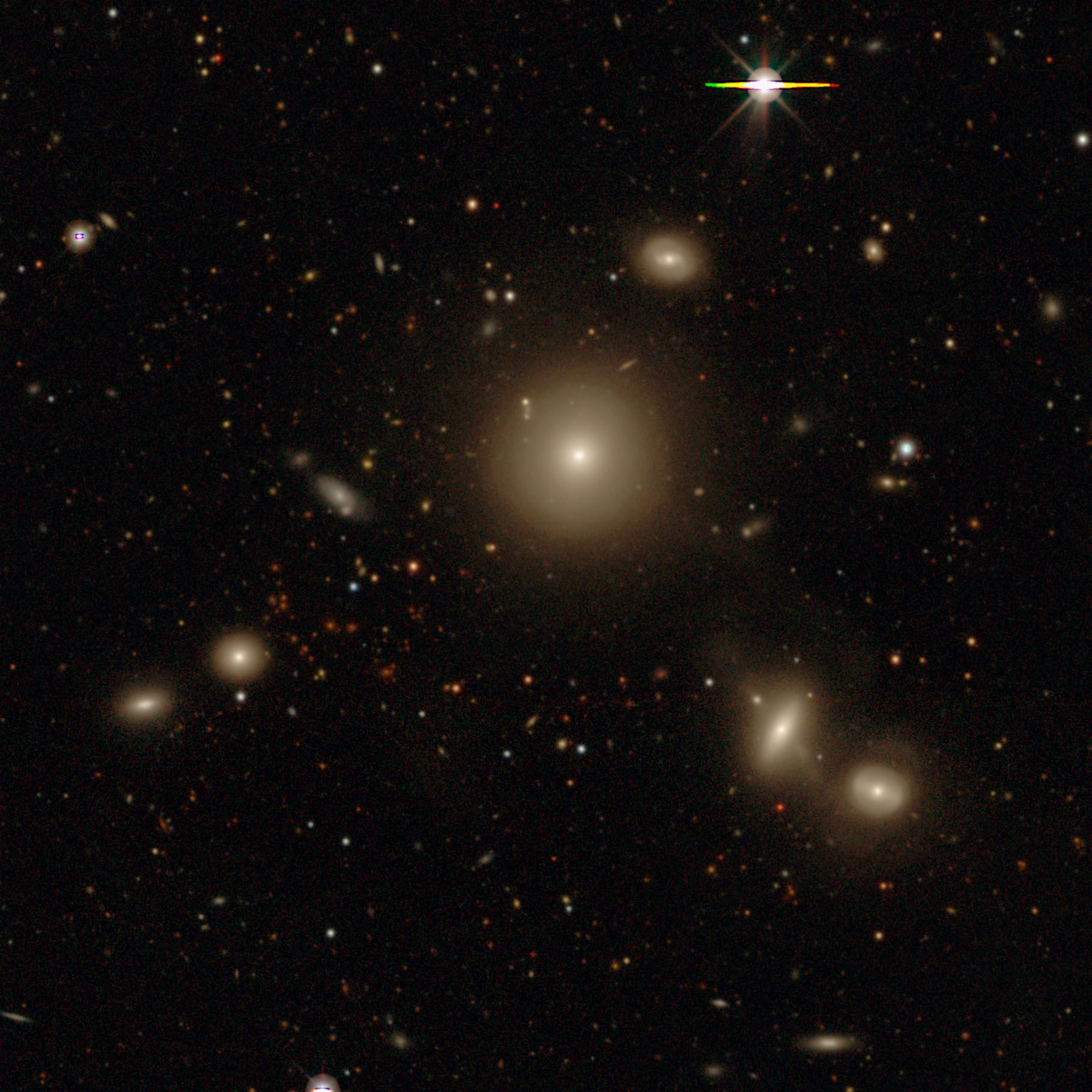
- Image of NGC 2807 (center) with neighboring galaxies

Observation data (J2000 epoch)
- Constellation: Cancer
- Right ascension: 9^{h} 18^{m} 33^{s}
- Declination: +19° 57′ 43″
- Surface brightness: 23.2 mag
- magnitude (J): 10.93
- magnitude (H): 10.26
- magnitude (K): 9.93

Characteristics
- Type: Lenticular

NGC 2809 is a lenticular galaxy located around 390 million light years from Earth in the constellation of Cancer.

It is situated close to the celestial equator thus making NGC 2809 at least particularly visible on both hemispheres during certain times of the year.
