= NGC 4014 =

Lenticular galaxy in Coma Berenices

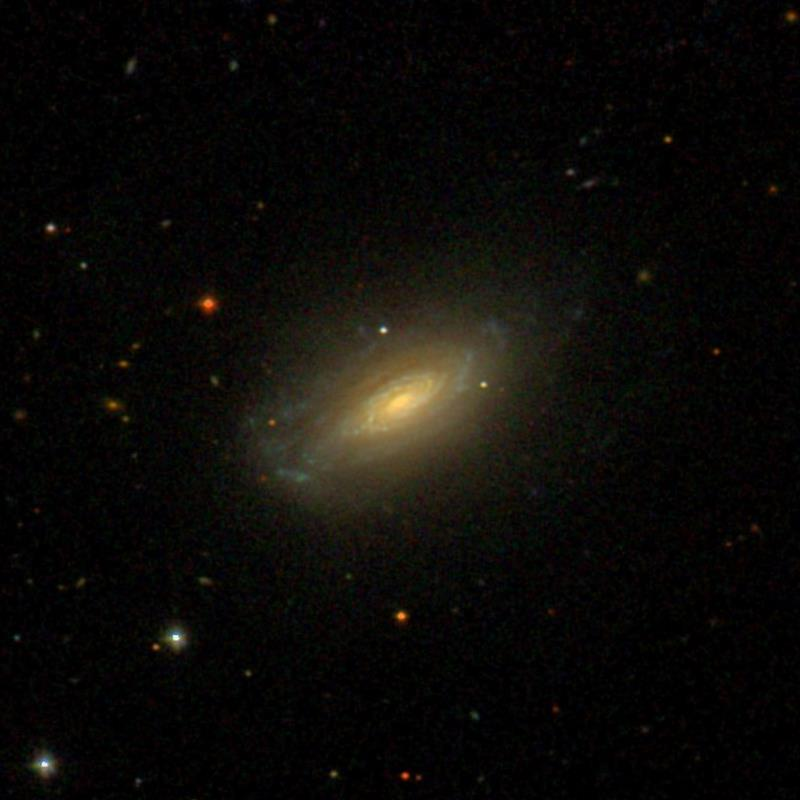
- NGC 4014 captured by SDSS

Observation data (J2000 epoch)
- Constellation: Coma Berenices
- Right ascension: 11^{h} 58^{m} 35.8512^{s}
- Declination: +16° 10′ 37.970″
- Redshift: 0.012552
- Distance: 197 Mly (60.4 Mpc)
- Surface brightness: 23.19 mag/arcsec2

Characteristics
- Type: Lenticular Galaxy

Other designations
- NGC 4028, UGC 6961, PGC 37695, MCG +03-31-005

NGC 4014 also known as NGC 4028, is a type S0-a lenticular galaxy in the constellation Coma Berenices. NGC 4014 is located 197 million light-years from Earth. The galaxy is situated close to the celestial equator and, as such, it is at least partly visible from both hemispheres at certain times of the year.

NGC 4014 was discovered by astronomer William Herschel on December 30, 1783. But it was rediscovered on April 26, 1832, by John Herschel who listed NGC 4014 as NGC 4028.

== Sources ==
- Bratton, Mark (2011-09-15). "NGC 4014". The Complete Guide to the Herschel Objects. Cambridge; New York: Cambridge University Press. p. 167. ISBN 978-0-521-76892-4. OCLC 712644488.
- Helou, G.; Hoffman, G. L.; Salpeter, E. E. (1984). "H I observations in the Virgo Cluster area. II - A complete, magnitude-limited sample of spiral galaxies". The Astrophysical Journal Supplement Series. 55: 433−453. Bibcode:1984ApJS...55..433H. doi:10.1086/190961. ISSN 0067-0049.
