= SN 1990E =

Supernova in the galaxy NGC 1935

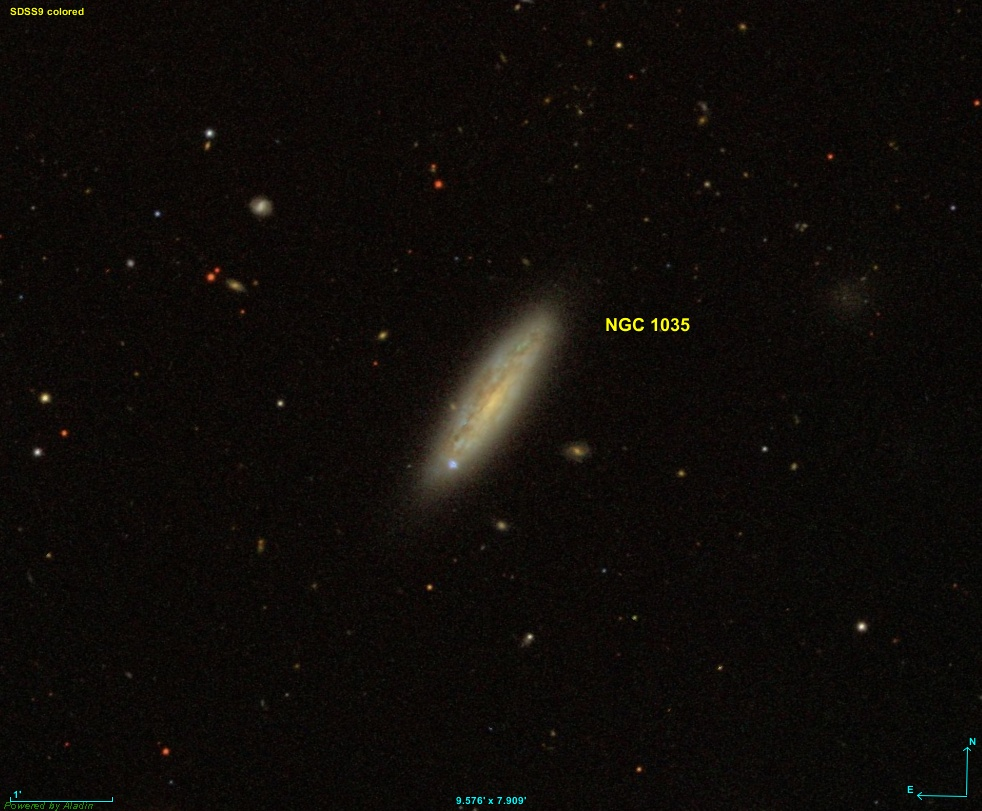
- The host galaxy named NGC 1035
- Event type: Supernova
- Type ll
- Constellation: Cetus
- Host: NGC 1035
- Other designations: SN 1990E

SN 1990E is Type ll supernova that occurred in the spiral galaxy NGC 1035 which is located in the Constellation of Cetus. Observations show that SN 1990E has a characteristic plateau displaying Hydrogen in the spectrum.

The supernova trapped a majority of the gamma rays produced by the radioactive decay of Cobalt-56. This supernova is similar to SN 1987A. It’s H a profile however differs from other Type ll supernova such as SN 1969L, SN 1973R or SN 1986I.
