= Land and water hemispheres =

Divisions of Earth's surface

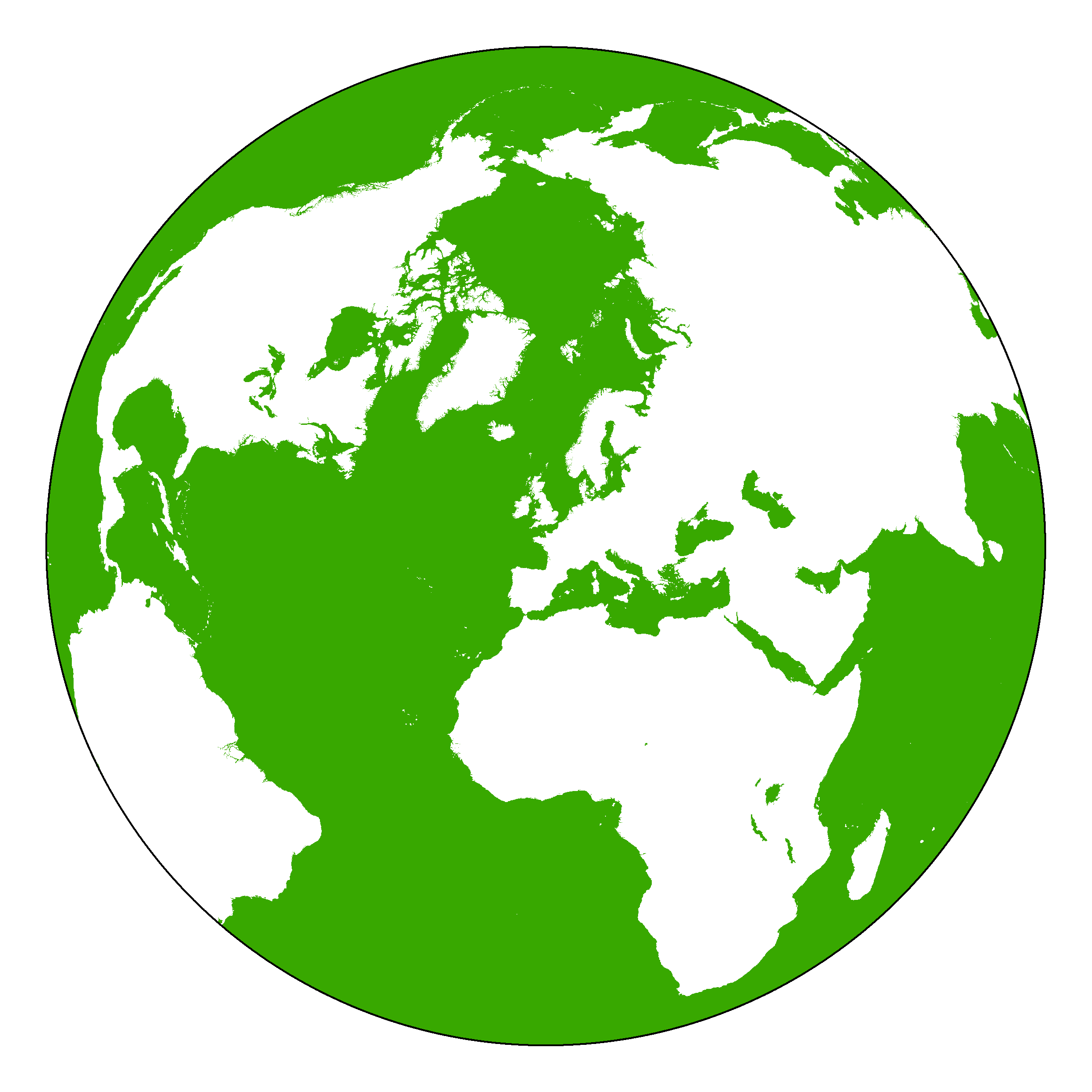
Land hemisphere

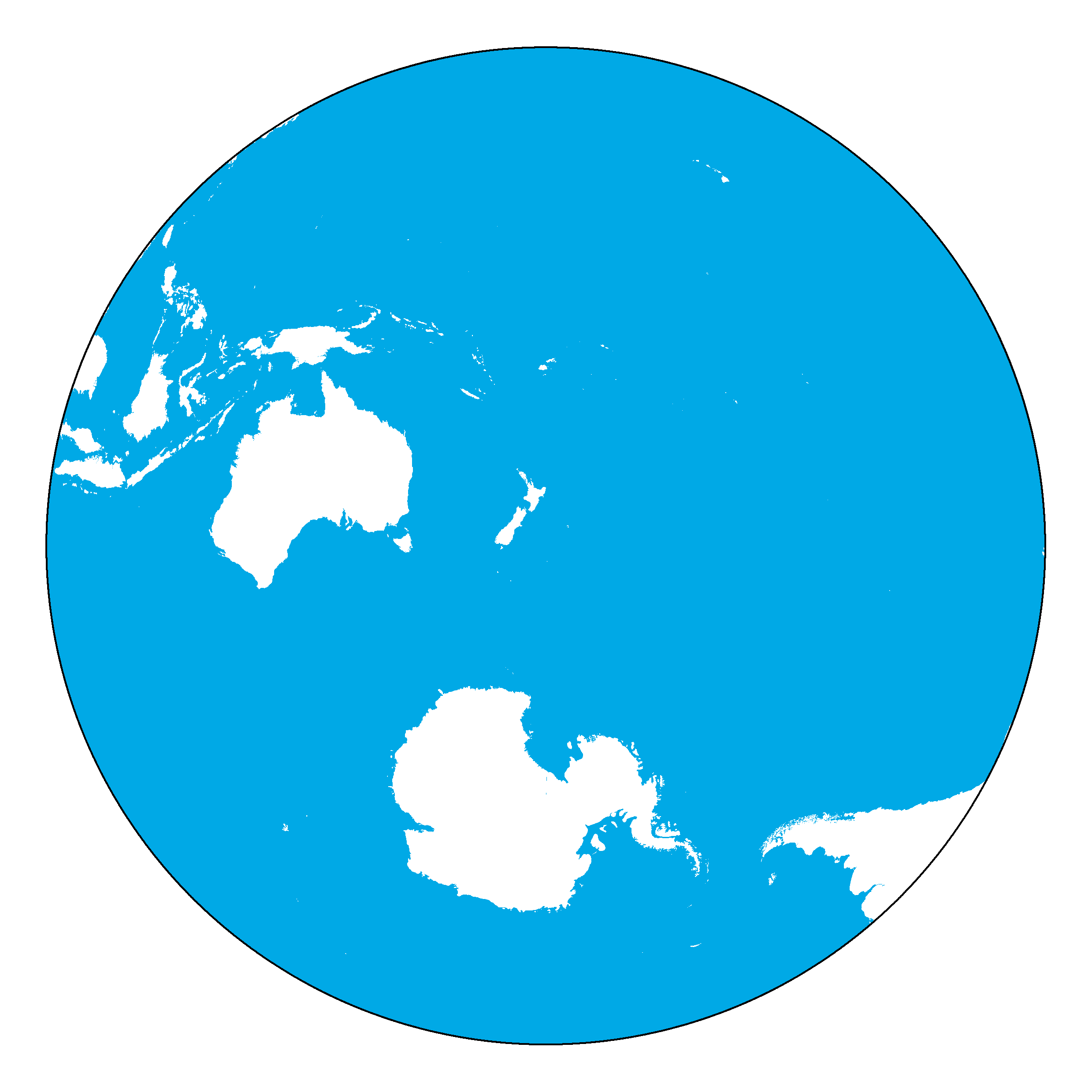
Water hemisphere

Front-view equal-area maps of each hemisphere
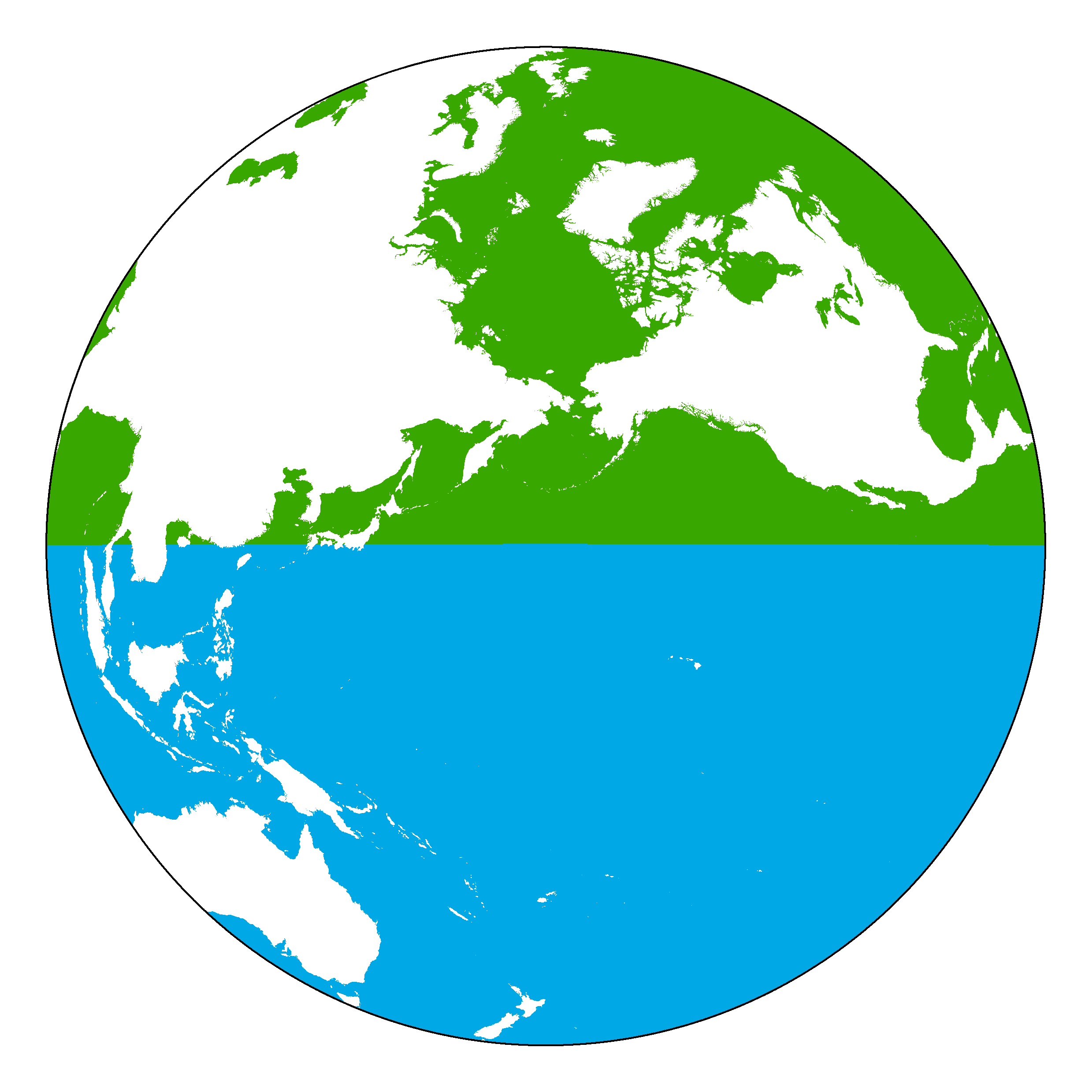
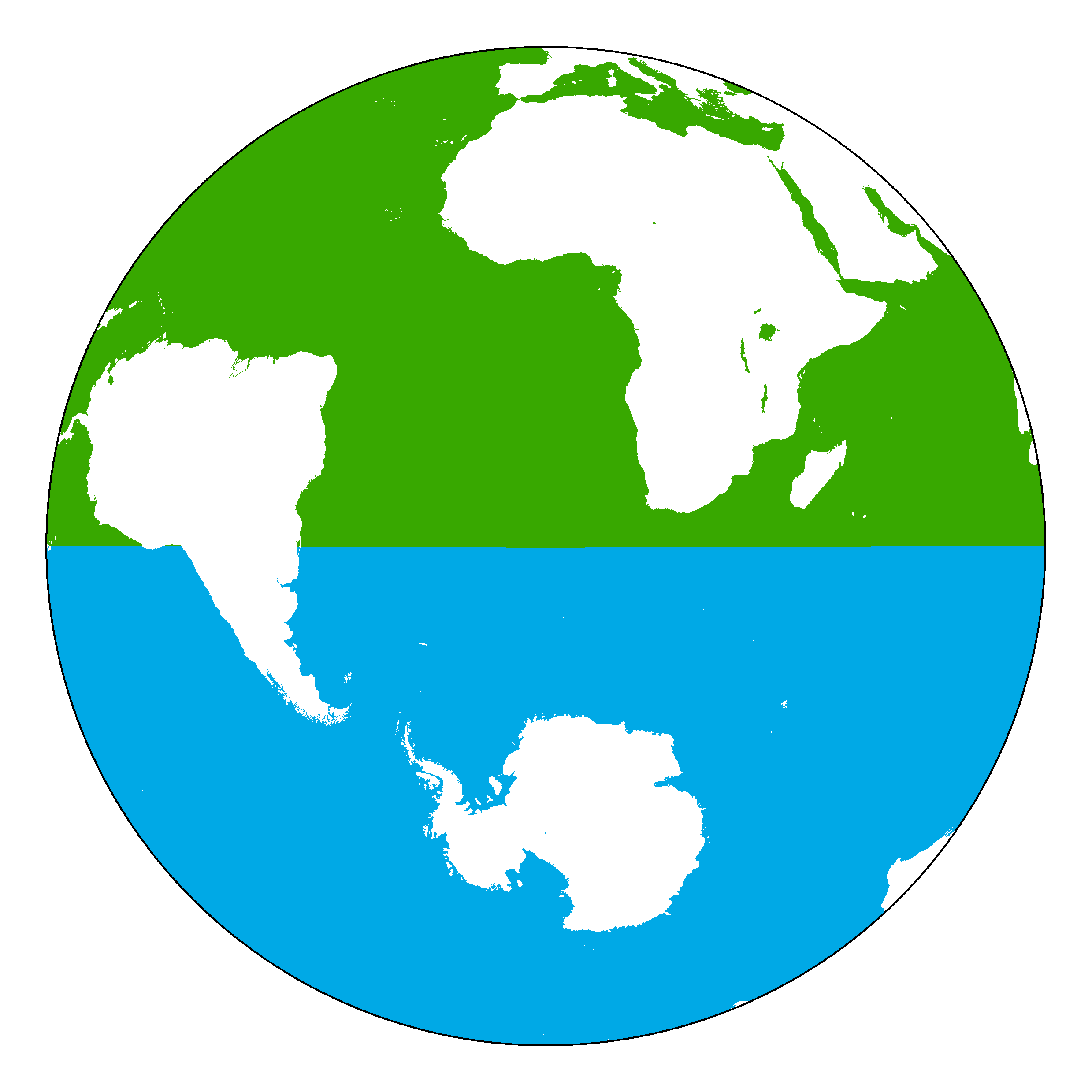
Side-view equal-area maps (land hemisphere top, water hemisphere bottom)

The land hemisphere and water hemisphere are the hemispheres of Earth containing the largest possible total areas of land and ocean, respectively. By definition (assuming that the entire surface can be classified as either "land" or "ocean"), the two hemispheres do not overlap.

The land hemisphere is centered in Metropolitan France, while the water hemisphere is centered southeast of New Zealand. The land hemisphere contains 80% of the planet's land, but is itself only 47% land. The water hemisphere is 89% ocean.

== Center ==
In 2002, the center of the land hemisphere was calculated as a central area spanning two focal points around Brittany and the Mediterranean Sea between the Balearic Islands and Catalonia.

A determination from 1945 places the centre of the land hemisphere at 47°13′N 1°32′W (in the city of Nantes, France). The centre of the water hemisphere is the antipode of the centre of the land hemisphere, and is therefore located at 47°13′S 178°28′E (near New Zealand's Bounty Islands in the Pacific Ocean). An alternative assignment from 1913 determines the centre of the land hemisphere to be at 47°24′42″N 2°37′15″W (in Île Dumet near Piriac-sur-Mer, France). The corresponding centre of the water hemisphere is located at 47°24′42″S 177°22′45″E (near New Zealand's Bounty Islands in the Pacific Ocean).

== Distribution of geographical features ==
The land hemisphere contains a substantial majority of the planet's land (80.1 percent), including nearly all of Asia (with Maritime Southeast Asia being the only notable exception) and most of South America. Africa, Europe, and North America are solely within the land hemisphere. However, even in the land hemisphere, the water area still slightly exceeds the land area (with 53 percent water to 47 percent land). This hemisphere is almost identical to the hemisphere containing the greatest human population. The land hemisphere also contains most of Earth's inland waters, including the African Great Lakes, Eurasia's Caspian Sea, the Great Lakes of North America, and Lake Baikal in Siberia.

The water hemisphere has only about one-fifth of the world's land, including Easter Island, the Hawaiian Islands, other Pacific islands, Maritime Southeast Asia, the southern tip of the Indochinese Peninsula, the southern portion of the Malay Peninsula, the Ryukyu Islands, Taiwan, and the Southern Cone of the Americas. Antarctica, Australia, and Zealandia are solely within the water hemisphere. Some sources further divide land into "dry land" and "ice cap". Antarctica provides the water hemisphere with the majority of Earth's ice.

Most of the Pacific Ocean and the Indian Ocean, and the whole Southern Ocean, are in the water hemisphere. The water hemisphere is approximately 89 percent water (almost all pertaining to the World Ocean), 6 percent dry land and 5 percent polar ice cap.

The table below shows Alphonse Berget's estimates of the land area in each continent in the land and water hemispheres.

| Continent | Land area within each hemisphere km^{2} (sq mi) | |
| Continent | Land | Water |
|---|---|---|
| Africa | 29,818,400 (11,512,949) | 0 (0) |
| America | 34,955,670 (13,496,460) | 3,391,010 (1,309,276) |
| Antarctica | 0 (0) | 13,120,000 (5,065,660) |
| Asia | 40,897,241 (15,790,513) | 3,245,649 (1,253,152) |
| Europe | 9,732,250 (3,757,643) | 0 (0) |
| Oceania | 0 (0) | 8,958,630 (3,458,946) |
| Total land area | 115,403,561 (44,557,564) | 28,715,289 (11,087,035) |

== See also ==
- Geographical centre of Earth
- Ocean world
