= NGC 1042 =

Spiral galaxy in the constellation Cetus

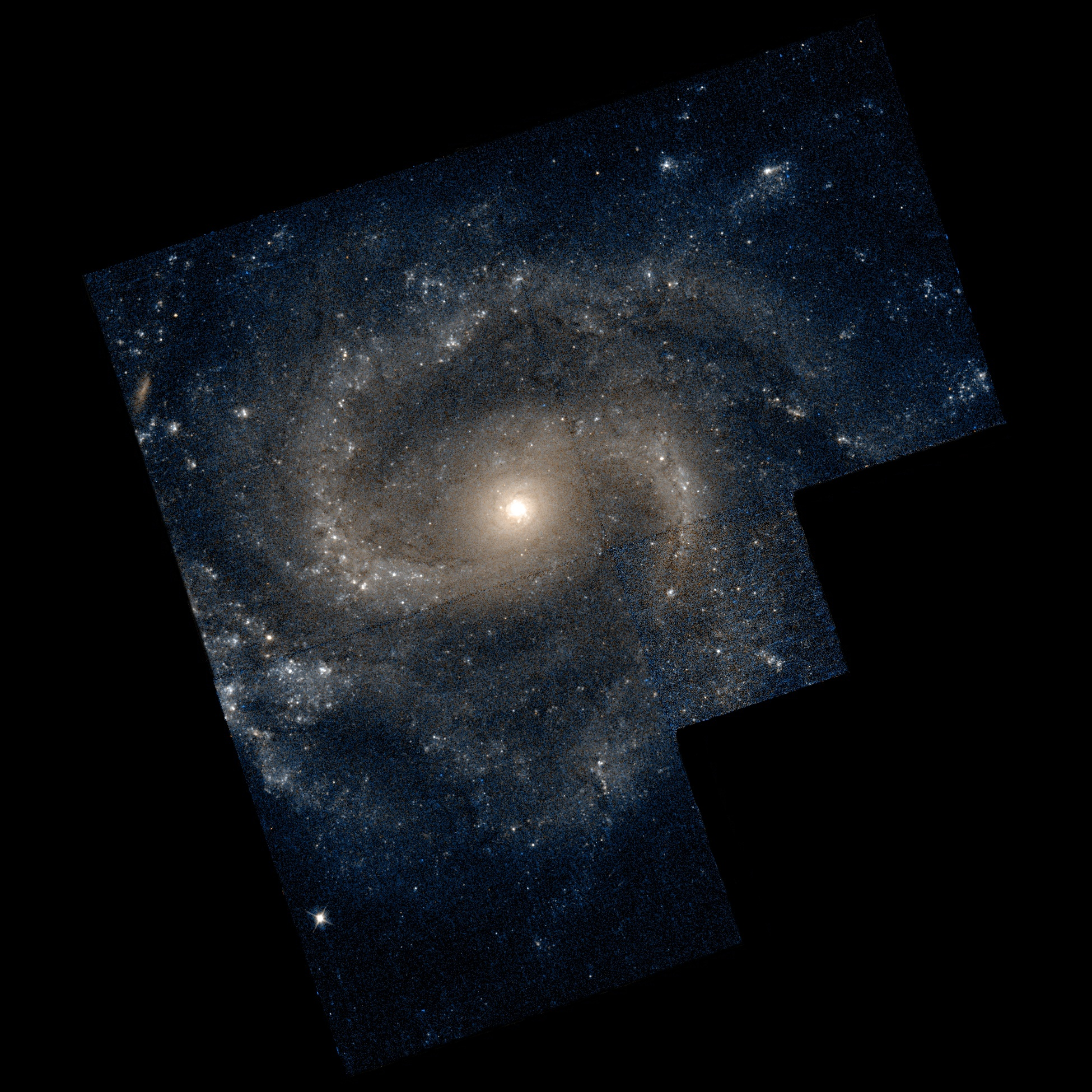
- NGC 1042 imaged by the Hubble Space Telescope

Observation data (J2000 epoch)
- Constellation: Cetus
- Right ascension: 02^{h} 40^{m} 24.0^{s}
- Declination: −08° 26′ 01″
- Redshift: 0.004573 ± 0.000007
- Heliocentric radial velocity: 1,371 ± 2 km/s
- Distance: 55.5 Mly (17.02 Mpc)
- Group or cluster: NGC 1052 group
- Apparent magnitude (V): 14.0

Characteristics
- Type: SAB(rs)cd
- Size: 39,200 ly
- Apparent size (V): 2.3′ × 1.0′

Other designations
- IRAS 02379-0838, MCG -02-07-054, PGC 10122

NGC 1042 is a spiral galaxy located in the constellation Cetus. It was discovered on 10 November 1885 by American astronomer Lewis Swift. The galaxy has an apparent magnitude of 14.0.

NGC 1042 is a low-luminosity active galaxy. Furthermore, its luminosity class is III–IV and it has a broad HI line. It is known that NGC 1042 also hosts an intermediate-mass black hole in its center.

NGC 1042 contains an ultraluminous X-ray source called NGC 1042 ULX1.

== Morphology ==
NGC 1042 is a late-type galaxy, classified as type SAB(rs)cd. It has a bulgeless structure with spiral arms consisting of two symmetric arms located in the inner side with ceaseless long outer arms, with an Arm Class 9 classification. The spiral galaxy type of NGC 1042 is a mystery; some astronomers classified it a barred spiral galaxy based on ellipse fitting via B- and H-band images, while others classified it an unbarred spiral galaxy. Further evidence by them suggests, the inner arms of NGC 1042 are curved with a bar-like structure that is mistaken as a bar.

== Nearby galaxies ==
NGC 1042 appears near the spiral galaxy NGC 1035 in the sky, with both having similar redshifts. The two objects may therefore be physically associated with each other. In additional, NGC 1042 is also a member of the NGC 1052 group. It is shown to be the only galaxy with a large gas reservoir, indicating it was stripped of gas during a past interaction with NGC 1052.

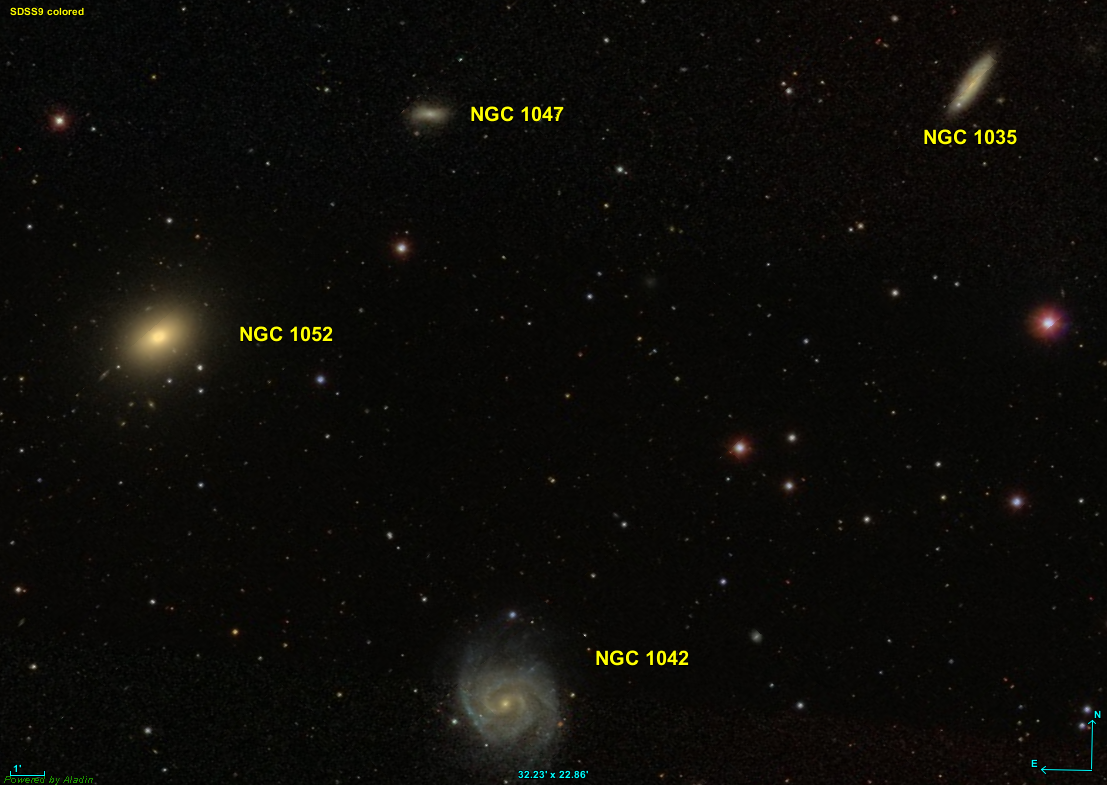
NGC 1042 and its neighbors including NGC 1035

== See also ==
- List of NGC objects (1001–2000)
