= NGC 1110 =

Galaxy in the constellation Eridanus

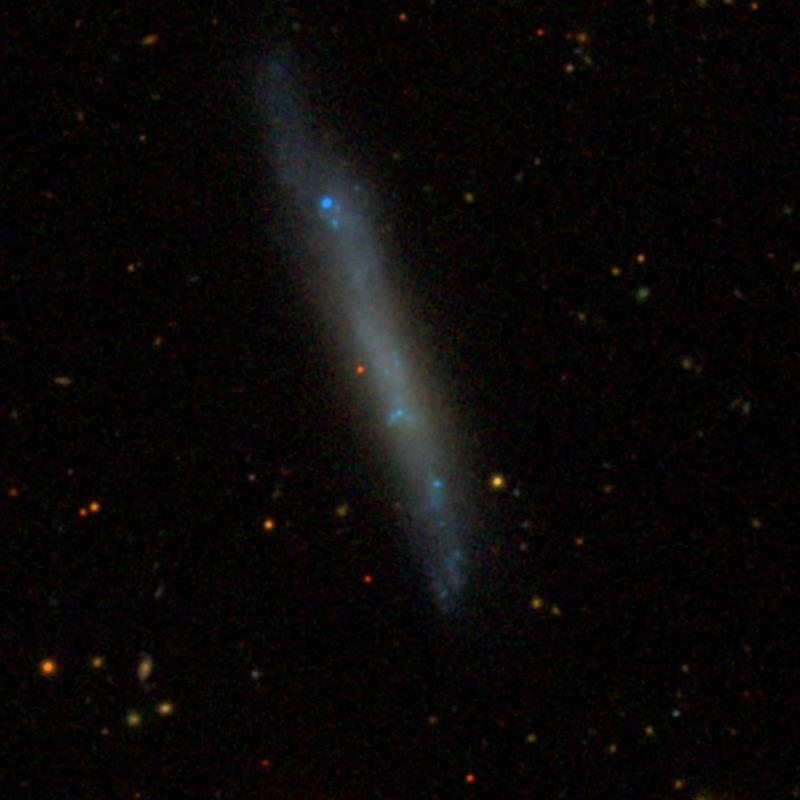
- A Sloan Digital Sky Survey (SDSS) image of NGC 1110

Observation data (J2000 epoch)
- Constellation: Eridanus
- Right ascension: 02^{h} 49^{m} 09.30^{s}
- Declination: −07° 50′ 15″
- Redshift: 0.004412 ± 4.65e-6
- Distance: 53 Mly (16.46 Mpc)
- Apparent magnitude (V): 13.9

Characteristics
- Type: SB(s)m? edge-on
- Size: 56,300 ly
- Apparent size (V): 2.57′ × 0.468′
- Notable features: N/A

Other designations
- IRAS F02467-0802, UGCA 43, PGC 10673, MCG-01-08-010, LEDA 10673

NGC 1110 is a barred spiral galaxy located around 53 million light-years away in the constellation Eridanus. NGC 1110 was discovered on December 21, 1886 by the astronomer Francis Preserved Leavenworth, and has a diameter of 56,000 light-years. NGC 1110 is not known to have lots of star formation, and it is not known to have an active galactic nucleus.
