= NGC 1035 =

Spiral galaxy located on the Cetus constellation

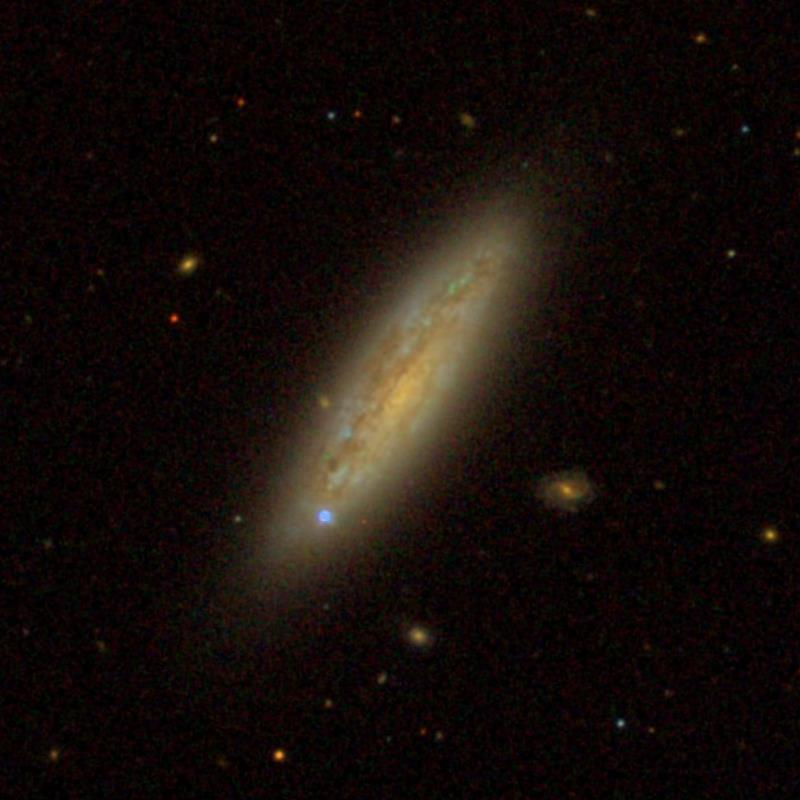
- Image of NGC 1035 obtained from the Sloan Digital Sky Survey

Observation data
- Constellation: Cetus
- Right ascension: 02h 40m 44s
- Declination: -08° 01’ 28”
- Absolute magnitude (B): 12.89
- Surface brightness: 22.36
- magnitude (J): 10.12
- magnitude (H): 9.42
- magnitude (K): 9.13

Characteristics
- Type: Spiral galaxy

NGC 1035 is a spiral galaxy located in the Constellation of Cetus. It is situated close to the celestial equator making it at least partially visible on both sides of the hemisphere during certain times of the year.

The neighboring galaxy NGC 1052-DF4 shows signs of being tidally disrupted and is missing most of its dark matter. The cause for this missing dark matter is from this galaxy stripping the dark matter from NGC 1052-DF4 and is now stripping apart the galaxy itself. Only the central regions of NGC 1052-DF4 remains unaffected.

== Supernova ==
SN 1990E is a Type ll supernova that occurred in this galaxy.
