= NGC 991 =

Intermediate spiral galaxy in the constellation Cetus

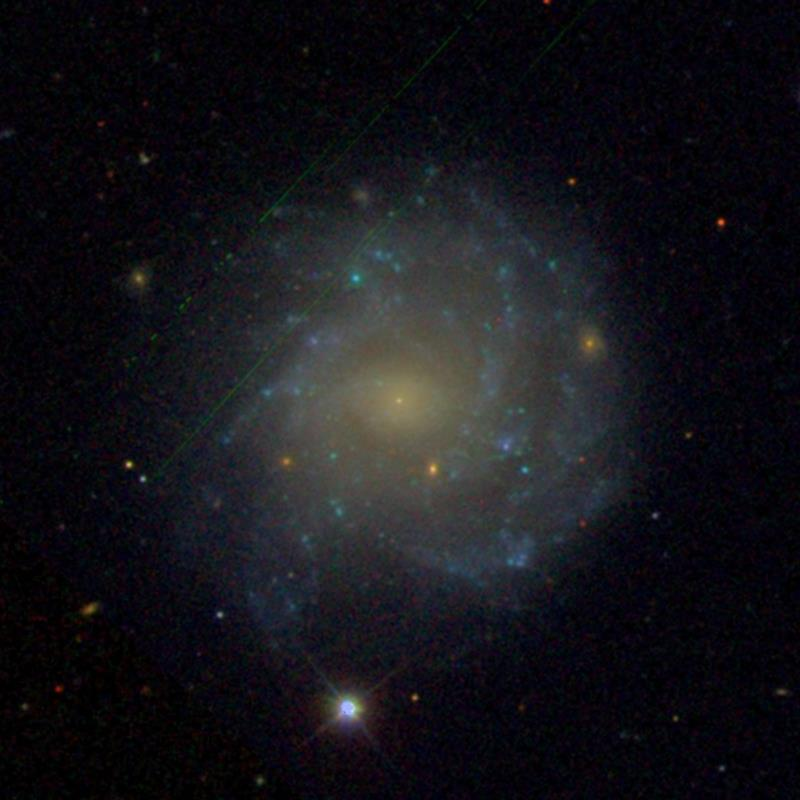
- SDSS image of NGC 991

Observation data (J2000 epoch)
- Constellation: Cetus
- Right ascension: 02^{h} 35^{m} 32.68341^{s}
- Declination: −07° 09′ 15.8406″
- Redshift: 0.005126
- Heliocentric radial velocity: 1532.8 km/s
- Distance: 62.9 ± 4.5 Mly (19.28 ± 1.37 Mpc)
- Apparent magnitude (B): 12.36

Characteristics
- Type: SAB(rs)c

Other designations
- MCG -01-07-023, PGC 9846

NGC 991 is an intermediate spiral galaxy the constellation Cetus. This galaxy was discovered by astronomer William Herschel in 1785.

== Supernova ==
One supernova has been observed in NGC 991: SN 1984L (Type Ib, mag. 14) was discovered by Robert Evans on 28 August 1984.

== See also ==
- List of NGC objects (1–1000)
