= NGC 1022 =

Galaxy in the constellation Cetus

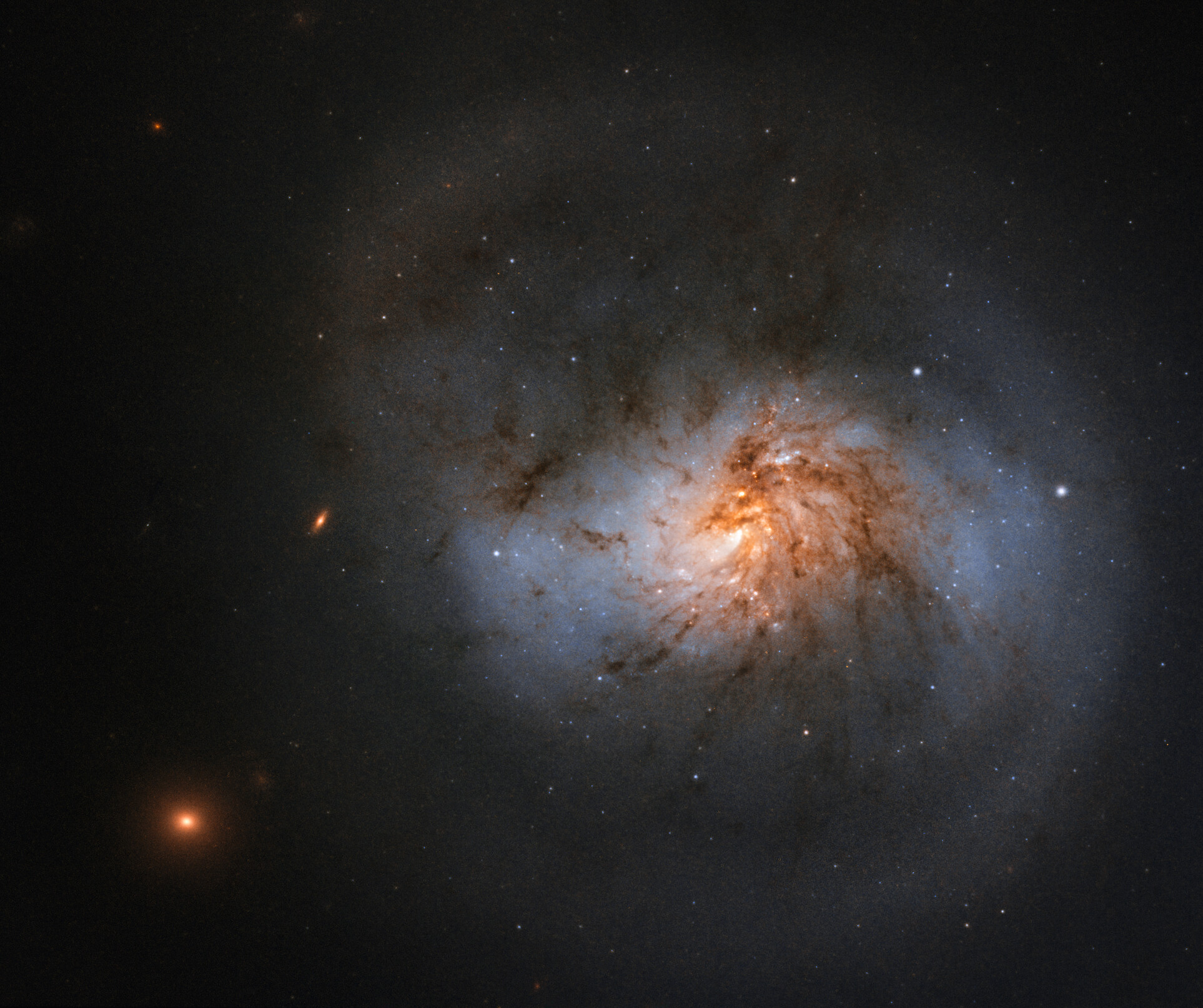

Observation data (J2000 epoch)
- Constellation: Cetus
- Right ascension: 02^{h} 38^{m} 32.74^{s}
- Declination: −06° 40′ 38.96″
- Redshift: 0.004847
- Heliocentric radial velocity: 1,453 km/s
- Distance: 67.7 Mly (20.75 Mpc)
- Apparent magnitude (V): 11.34±0.13
- Apparent magnitude (B): 12.09±0.13

Characteristics
- Type: SBa (R')SB(s)a;HII; SBa(r)p
- Apparent size (V): 2.4′ × 2.0′

Other designations
- NGC 1022, PGC 10010

NGC 1022 is a barred spiral galaxy located approximately 68 million light years away in the equatorial constellation of Cetus. It was discovered on September 10, 1785, by William Herschel. NGC 1022 is a member of the Cetus-Aries group of galaxies.

This galaxy has a morphological classification SBa, indicating a central bar and tightly wound spiral arms. The elliptical outline of the galaxy has an isophotal axis ratio of 0.78 with an angular size of 2.4′ by 2.0′ and a position angle of 115°. The galactic plane is inclined at an angle of 24° to the line of sight from the Earth. The central bar is boxy in shape with narrow spurs that are offset from the main axis.

NGC 1022 is forming new stars at an estimated rate of 1.1 solar masses per year. Infrared observations of the nucleus suggests a high rate of star formation activity. The circumnuclear region is home to three giant H II regions with one at the nucleus, a second to the northeast, and the third slightly to the northwest. The galaxy was observed as part of a Hubble study of black holes.
