= NGC 1047 =

Lenticular galaxy in the constellation of Cetus

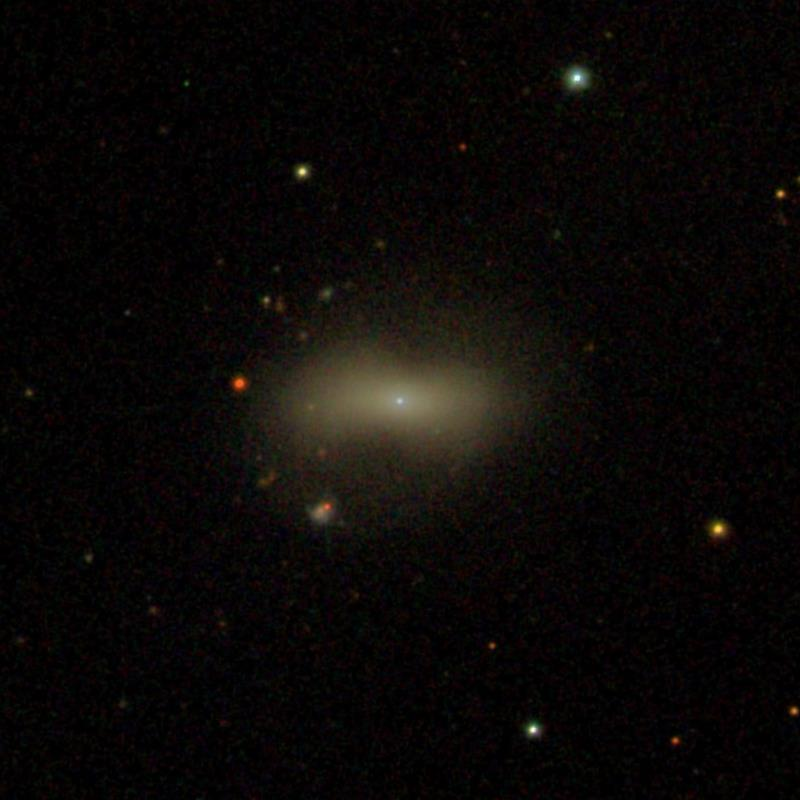
- Image of NGC 1047 capture by SDSS

Observation data
- Constellation: Cetus
- Right ascension: 02h 41m 48s
- Declination: -08° 02’ 22”
- Redshift: 0.004513
- Distance: 62 million ly
- Absolute magnitude (B): 14.5
- Surface brightness: 23.79
- magnitude (J): 11.76
- magnitude (H): 11.14
- magnitude (K): 11

Characteristics
- Type: Lenticular

Other designations
- LEDA 10132, MCG-01-07-032

NGC 1047 is a lenticular galaxy located about 62 million light years from Earth in Cetus.It was discovered on November 10, 1885 by Lewis Swift

It is situated close to the celestial equator making it visible from both sides of the hemisphere during certain times of the year.

== See also ==
- List of NGC objects (4001-5000)
- List of NGC objects
