= NGC 1052 =

Elliptical galaxy in the constellation Cetus

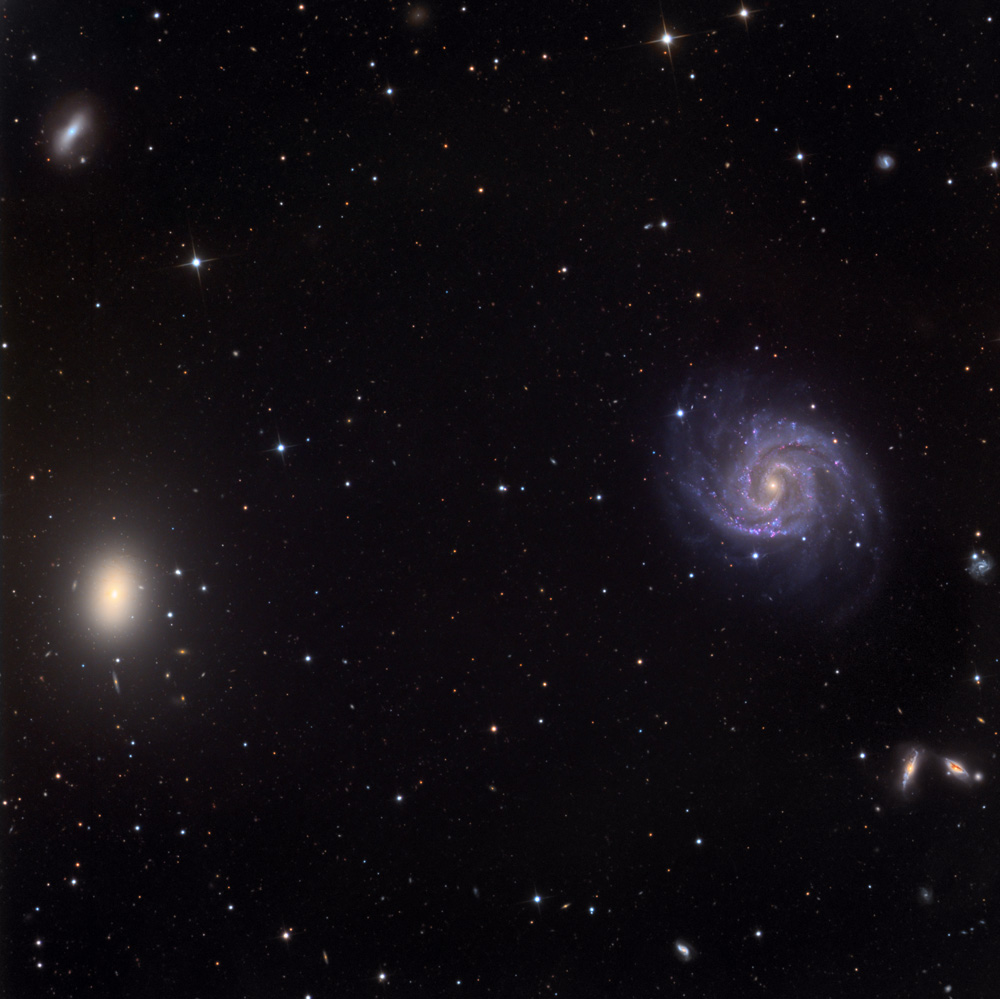
- NGC 1052 (center left) and NGC 1042 (center right) as imaged by Schulman Telescope. Credit: Adam Block/Mount Lemmon SkyCenter/University of Arizona

Observation data (J2000 epoch)
- Right ascension: 02^{h} 41^{m} 04.79851^{s}
- Declination: −08° 15′ 20.7517″
- Redshift: 0.004930
- Heliocentric radial velocity: 1474 ± 26 km/s
- Distance: 62.0 Mly (19.00 Mpc)
- Group or cluster: NGC 1052 Group
- Apparent magnitude (V): 10.47
- Apparent magnitude (B): 11.41

Characteristics
- Type: E4
- Apparent size (V): 3.0′ × 2.1′

Other designations
- MCG -01-07-034, PGC 10175

NGC 1052 is an elliptical galaxy in the constellation Cetus. It was discovered on January 10, 1785 by the astronomer William Herschel. It is a member of the eponymous NGC 1052 Group.

== Features ==
NGC 1052 is located at a distance of around 63 million light years from the Milky Way, and has a LINER-type active galactic nucleus which signals the intense starburst activity in the galaxy's center that were confirmed with observations with better resolution showing a number of star-forming regions and young star clusters.

NGC 1052 shows also two small jets emerging from its nucleus as well as a very extended disc of neutral hydrogen, far larger than the galaxy itself. Additionally, the stars and the ionized gas rotate along different axes. All these features suggesting a gas-rich galaxy collided and merged with it 1 billion years ago producing all the above features.

The shape of NGC 1052 is thought to be a triaxial ellipsoid. The longest axis of the ellipsoid is probably aligned at a position angle of −41°, which is the axis around which the ionized gas would be rotating.

A scale image of NGC 1052 and its satellite galaxies is available at the reference.

== Central black hole ==
NGC 1052 hosts a rapidly rotating supermassive black hole with a mass of 154 million M_{☉} with a large magnetic field of 2.6 tesla, which, according to astronomer Anne-Kathrin Baczko, the leader of the team that made this discovery, provides enough magnetic energy to power the previously mentioned twin relativistic jets.

This black hole is a promising target for imaging by the Event Horizon Telescope. The location of the black hole in NGC 1052 was by 2016 the most precisely known in the universe, with the exception of Sagittarius A*, the supermassive black hole found at the heart of our own galaxy.

== See also ==
- NGC 1052-DF2, a galaxy assumed to be associated with NGC 1052, and which appears to have little or no dark matter
- NGC 1052-DF4, another galaxy assumed to be associated with NGC 1052, and which appears to have little or no dark matter
