= Hemispheres of Earth =

Division of the globe into equal halves

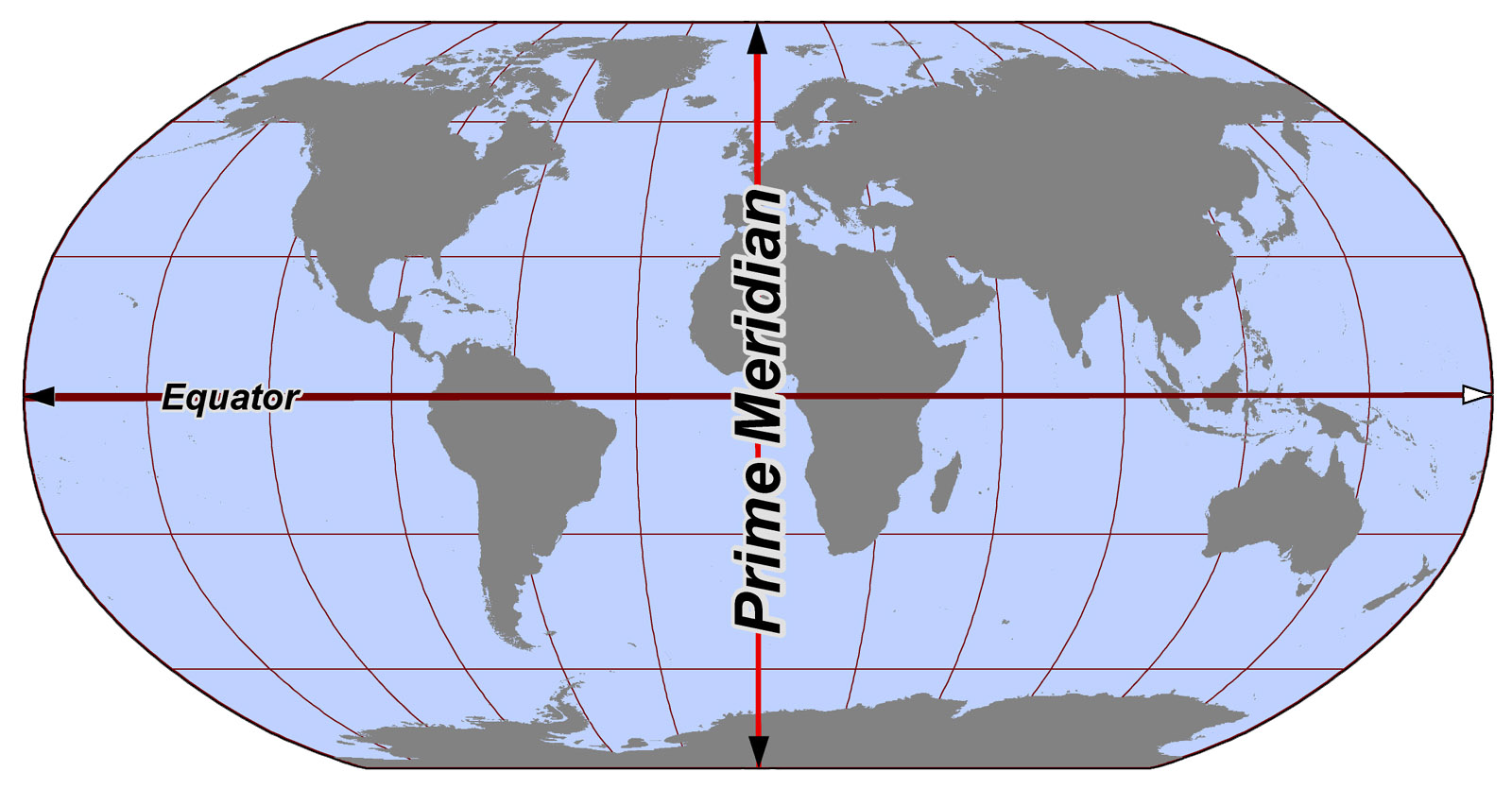
The division of Earth by the Equator and the prime meridian

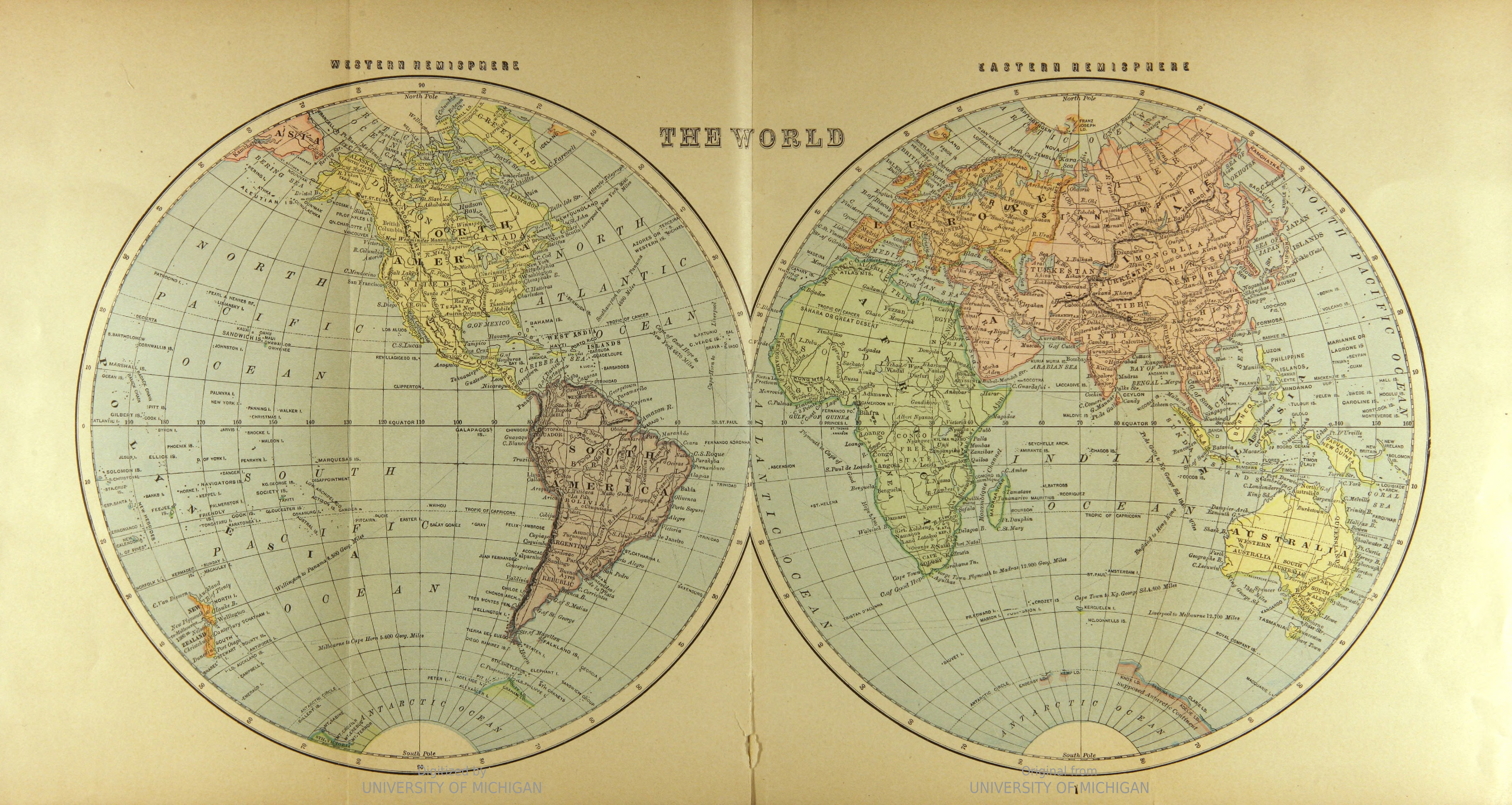
19th-century map depicting the Western and Eastern Hemispheres, slightly adjusted to keep Europe and Africa whole

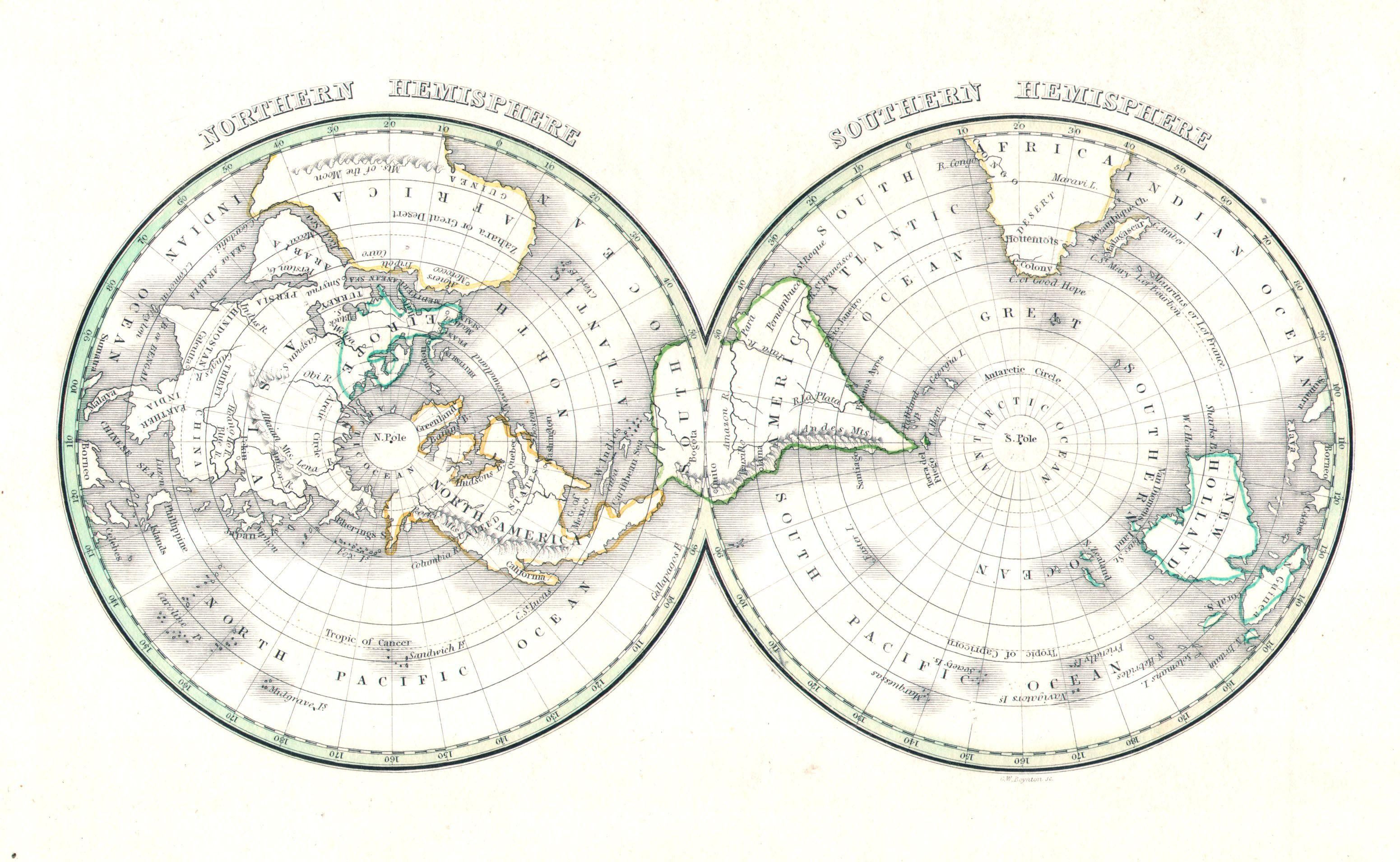
19th-century map depicting the Northern and Southern Hemispheres

In geography and cartography, hemispheres of Earth are any division of the globe into two equal halves (hemispheres), typically divided into northern and southern halves by the Equator and into western and eastern halves by the Prime meridian. Hemispheres can be divided geographically or culturally, or based on religion or prominent geographic features. Use of these divisions is applied when studying Earth's geographic distribution, cultural differences, and other geographic, demographic and socioeconomic features.

== Geographical hemispheres ==
Geographical hemispheres are primarily split by latitudinal (north-south) and longitudinal (east-west) markers:

=== North-South ===
1. Northern Hemisphere: The half that lies north of the Equator. This hemisphere contains approximately 68% of Earth's landmass and is home to about 90% of the global population. It includes North America, Europe, Asia, and most of Africa.
2. Southern Hemisphere: The half that lies south of the Equator. It contains approximately 32% of Earth's landmass and is home to about 10% of the global population. It includes South America, Australia, Antarctica, and the southern parts of Africa.

=== East-West ===
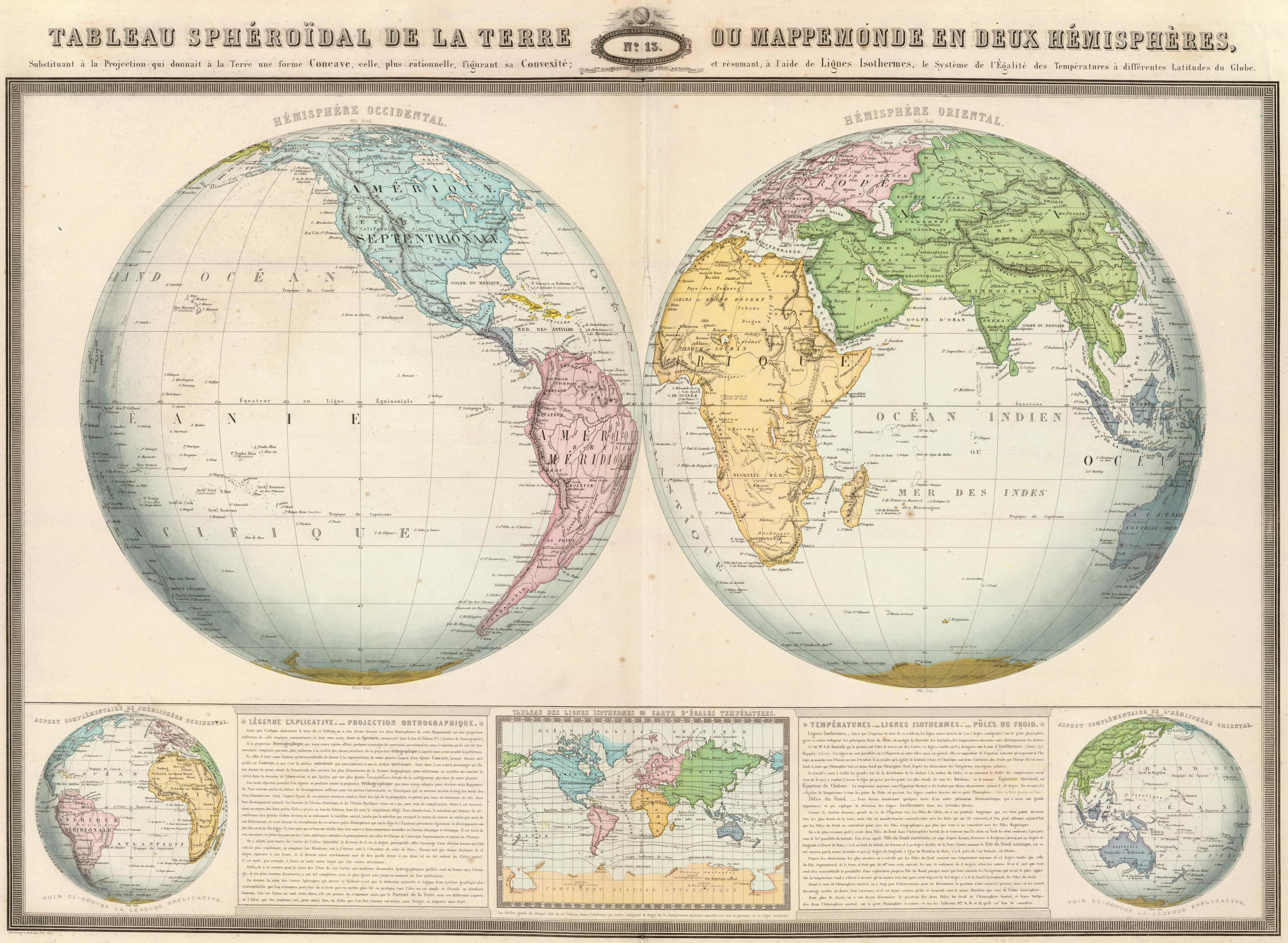
A spheroidal projection, showing the Earth's Western and Eastern hemispheres as seen from a vantage directly above the equator at 120°W and 60°E respectively

1. Eastern Hemisphere: Notionally, the half that lies east of the prime meridian and west of the 180th meridian. This hemisphere includes most of Africa, Europe, Asia, and Australia, as well as the Indian and Western Pacific Oceans. In practice, maps typically move the division line westward to keep Europe and Africa together.
2. Western Hemisphere: Notionally, the half that lies west of the prime meridian and east of the 180th meridian. This hemisphere includes North and South America, the eastern Pacific Ocean, the Caribbean Sea, and the majority of the Atlantic Ocean.

== Alternative hemispheres ==
Alternative Earth hemispheres can divide the globe along cultural or religious lines, or be used to maximize the prominence of geographic features. For example:

=== Cultural and religious hemispheres ===
1. Eastern Hemisphere: Historically reckoned in Western culture as the more staid or conservative Old World.
2. Western Hemisphere: In such accounts, taken as the more liberal New World.

=== Geographical feature-based hemispheres ===
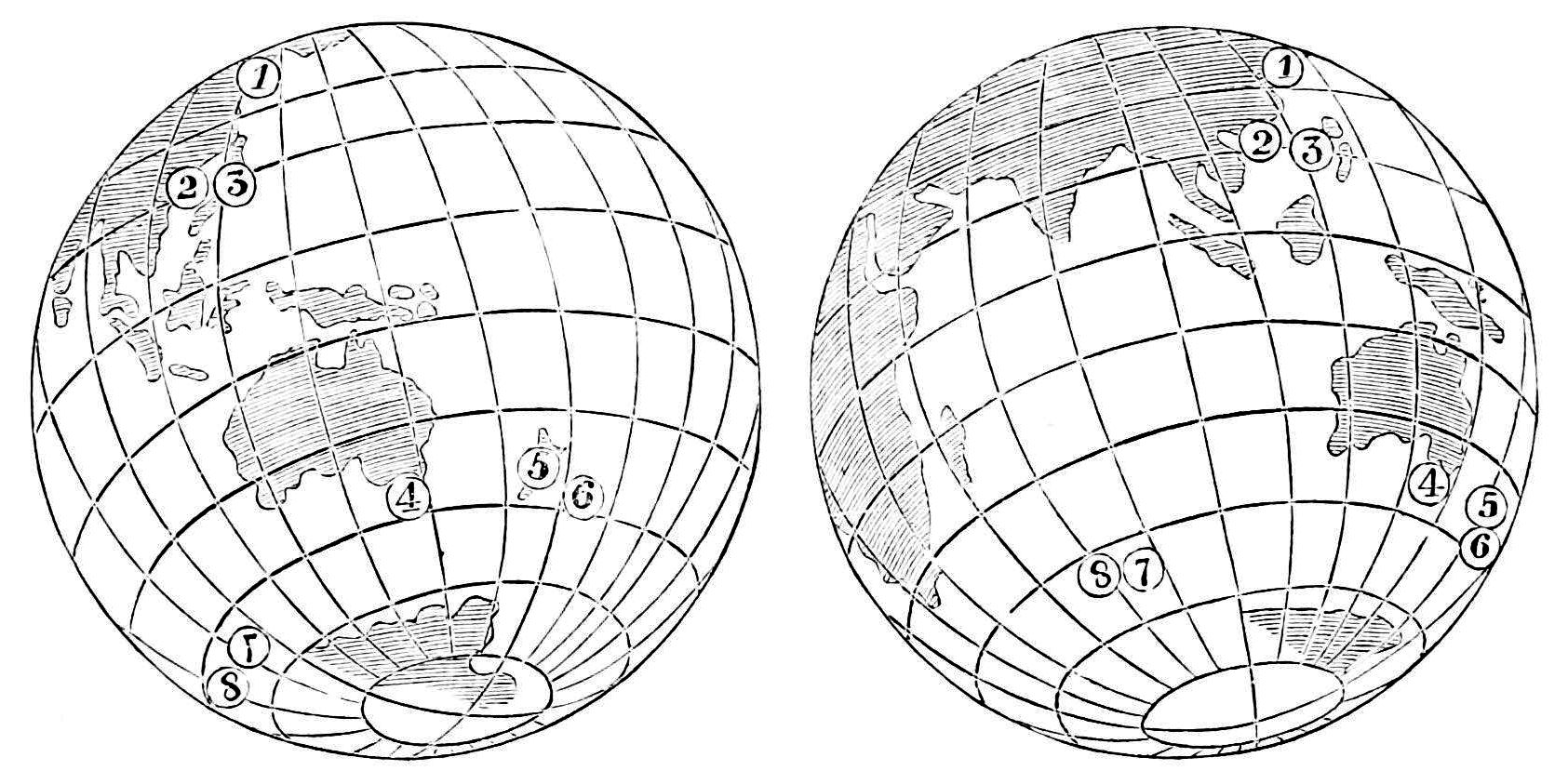
The Earth as seen from the vantage point of the Sun on two consecutive days. The terrestrial terminator is located at the circumference of each image of the Earth.

1. Terrestrial terminator-based hemispheres: Earth may be split into hemispheres of day and night by the terrestrial terminator, which is the boundary between the illuminated and dark sides of the planet. This division changes continuously as Earth rotates. The area subjected to direct illumination is almost exactly half the planet; but because of atmospheric and other effects that extend the reach of indirect illumination, the area of the planet covered by either direct or indirect illumination amounts to slightly more than half the surface.
2. 20° West and 160° East-based hemispheres: This alternative division prevents the splitting of Africa and Europe.

=== Land-water hemispheres ===
Alternative hemisphere schemes can divide the planet in a way that maximizes the prominence of one geographic feature or another in each division, such as the land-water division:

- Land Hemisphere: Centered near 47°N, 1°E, near the city of Nantes, France, this hemisphere contains the largest possible area of land, including most of the world's continents and major landmasses.
- Water Hemisphere: Centered near 47°S, 179°W, in the South Pacific Ocean (southwest of the Chatham Islands, New Zealand), this hemisphere contains the largest possible area of water, including most of the Indian, Pacific, and Southern Oceans.

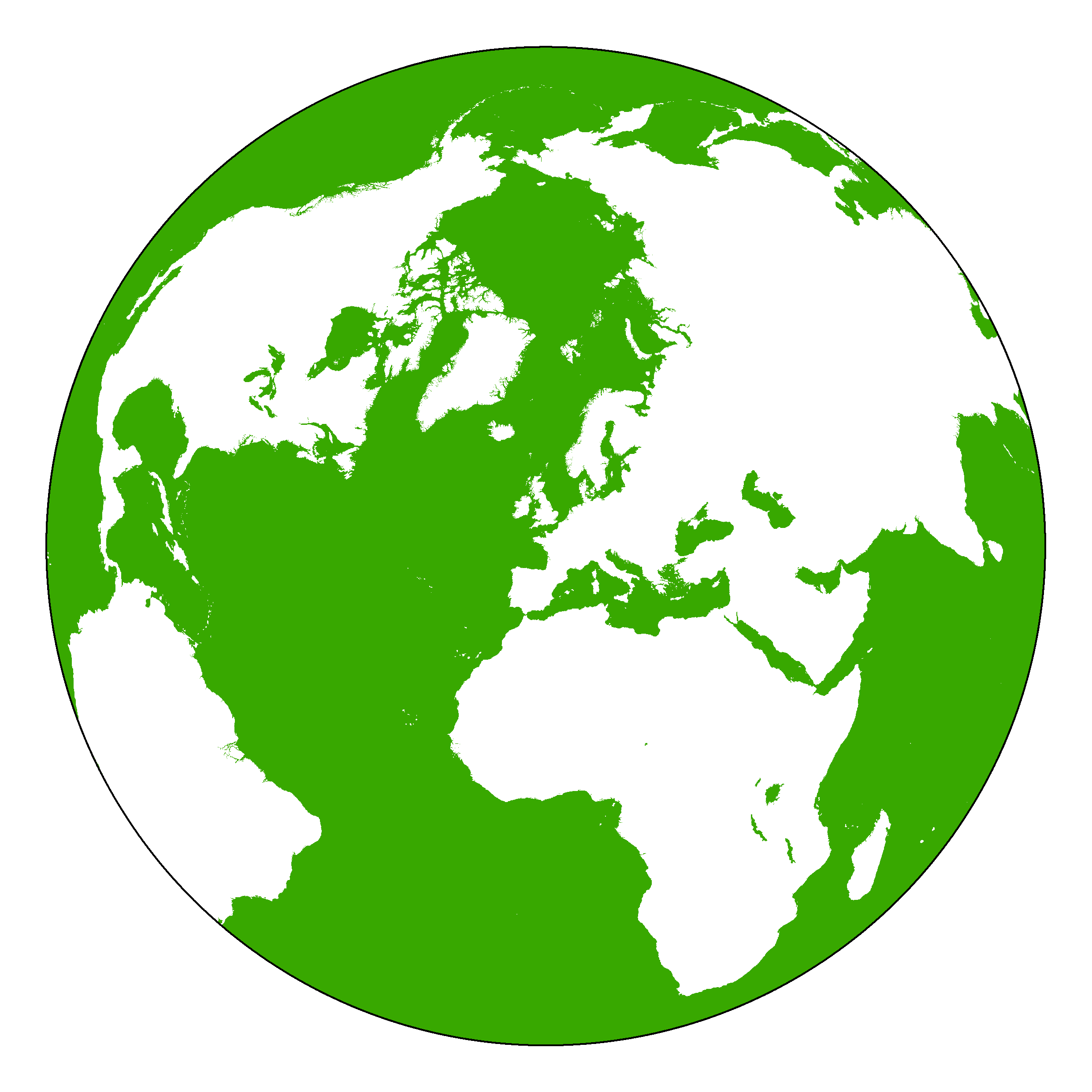
The Land Hemisphere

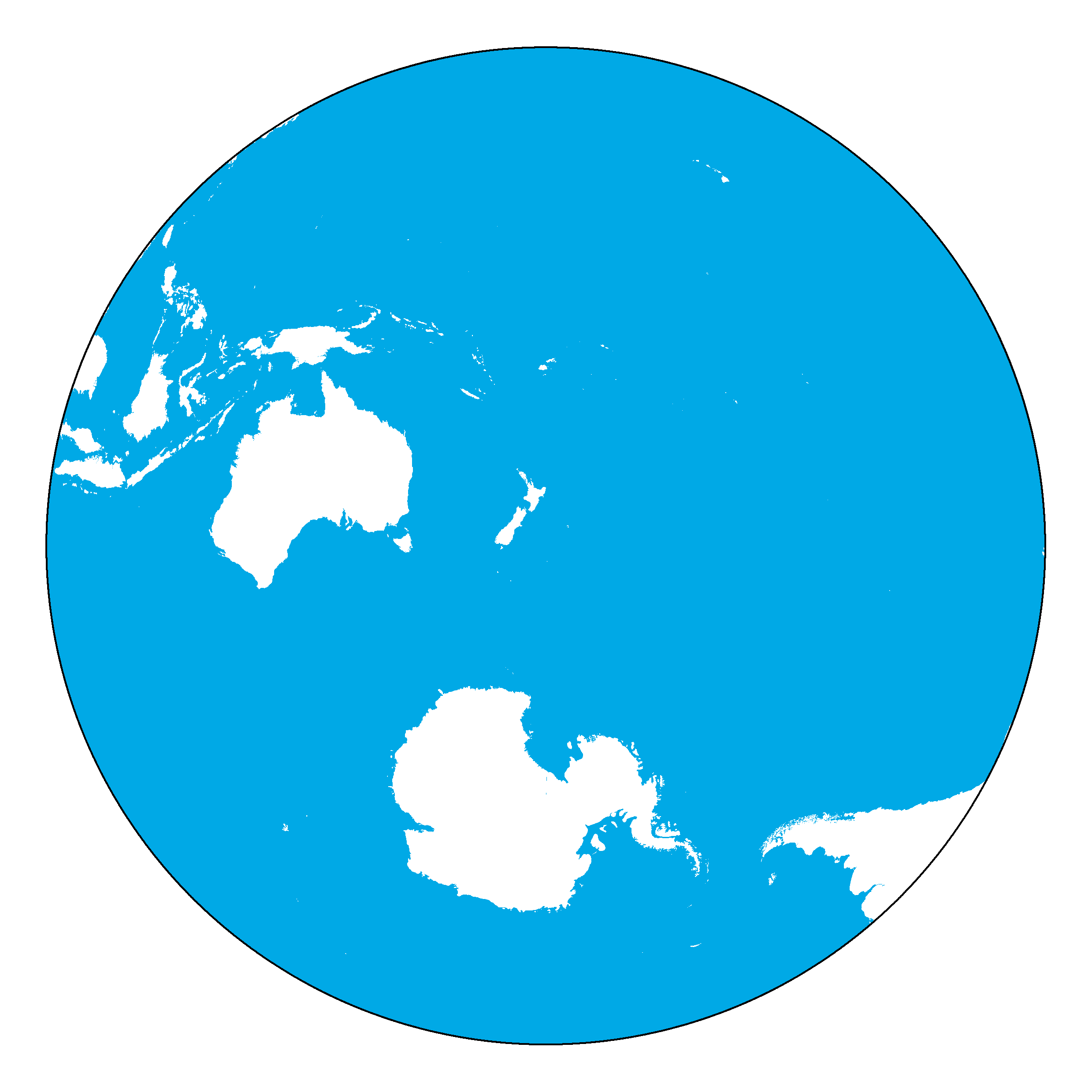
The Water Hemisphere

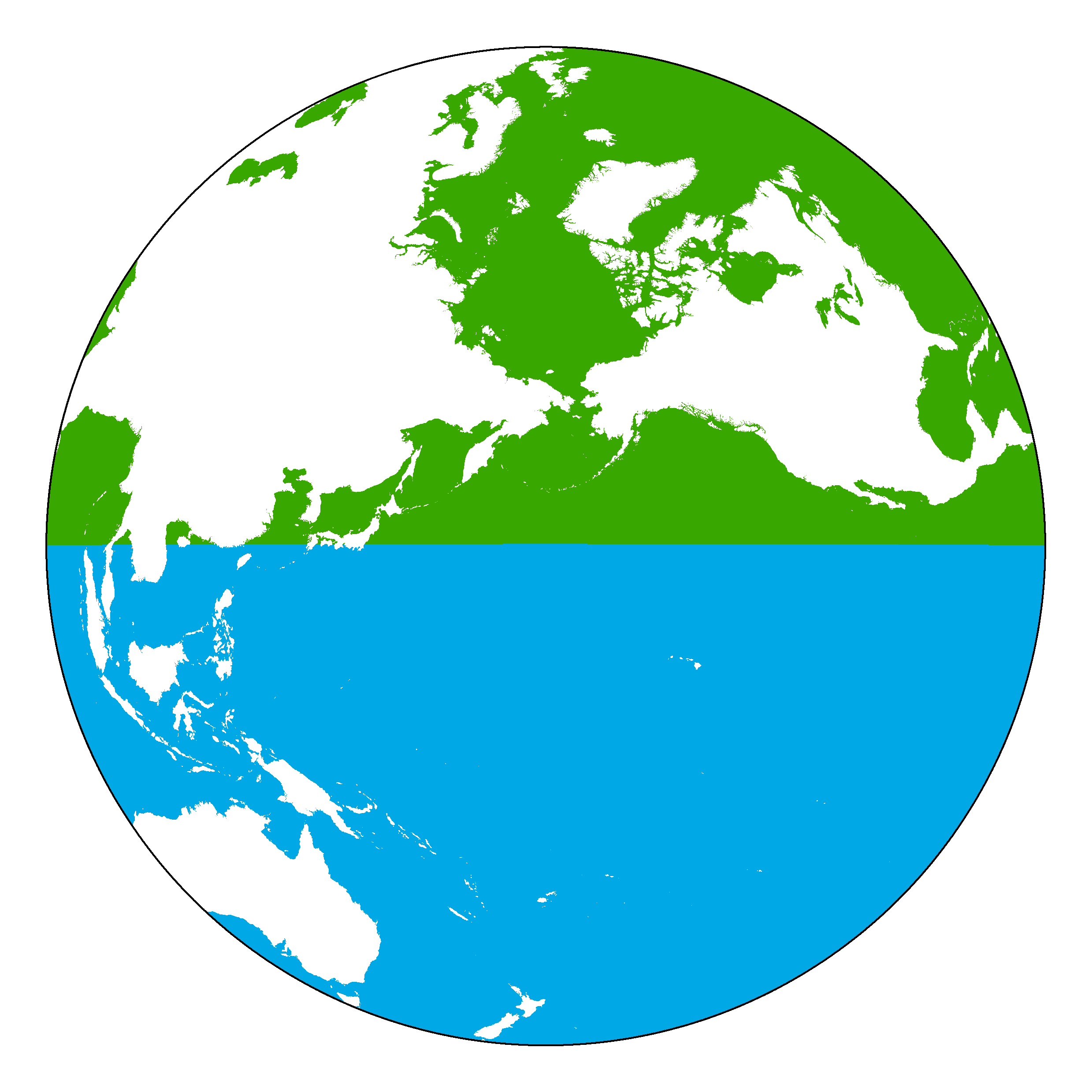
The Land Hemisphere is at the top, and the Water Hemisphere is at the bottom.

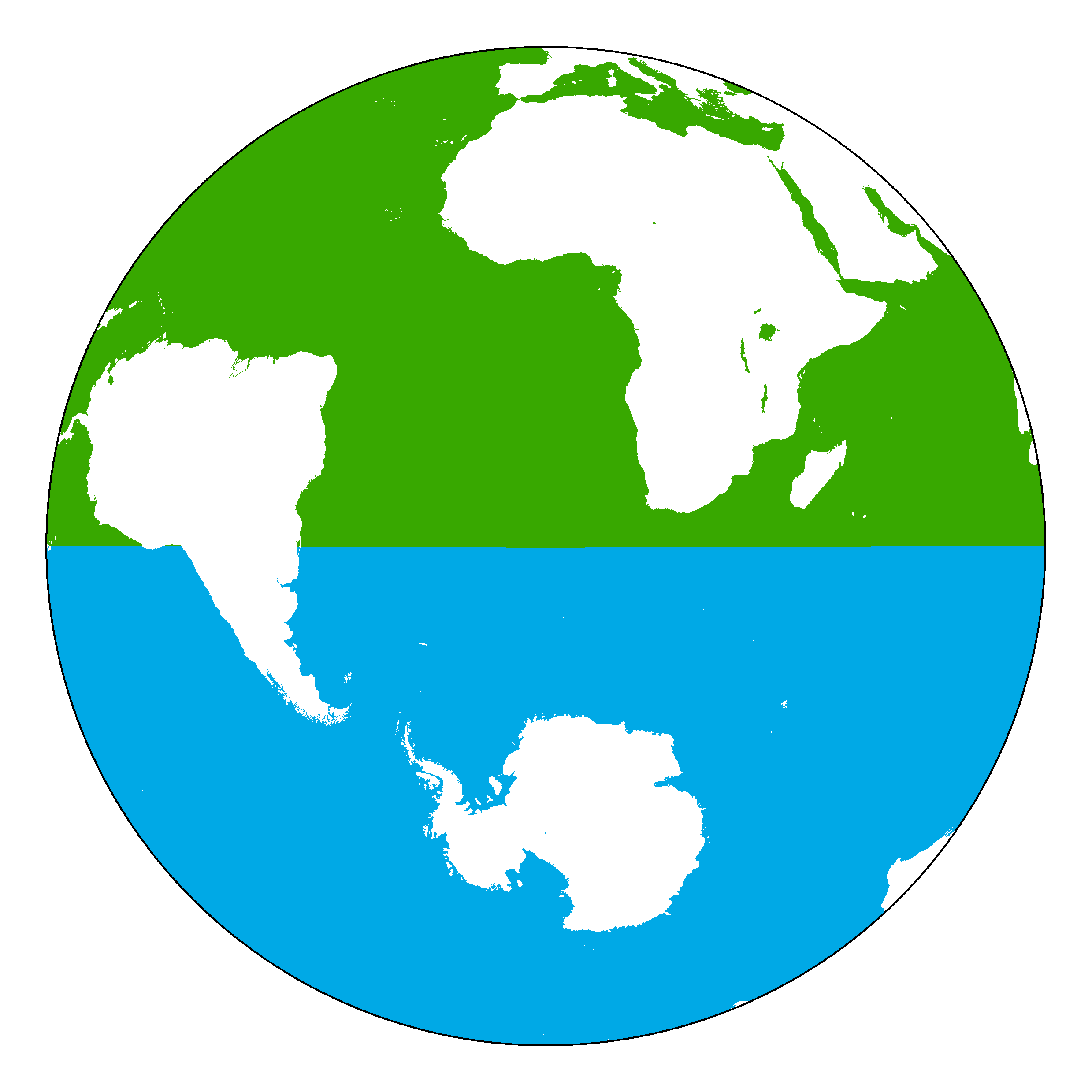
After rotation, the Land Hemisphere is still at the top and the Water Hemisphere is still at the bottom

== Continents and oceans by predominant hemisphere ==
Continent	Latitudinal hemispheres	Longitudinal hemispheres	Land-water hemispheres
Africa	both	East	Land
Europe	North	East	Land
Asia	North	East	Land
North America	North	West	Land
South America	South	West	Land
Australia	South	East	Water
Antarctica	South	both	Water

Ocean	Latitudinal hemispheres	Longitudinal hemispheres	Land-water hemispheres
Pacific Ocean	both	West?	Water
Atlantic Ocean	both	West?	Land
Indian Ocean	South	East	Water
Southern Ocean	South	both	Water
Arctic Ocean	North	both	Land

== See also ==
- Earth's geographical centre
- Global North and Global South
- Land and water hemispheres
- East–West dichotomy
