= 1974 in art =

Events from the year 1974 in art.

== Events ==
- 26 April – Nineteen Old Master paintings from the Beit collection are stolen from Russborough House in Ireland by a Provisional Irish Republican Army gang including English heiress Rose Dugdale.
- Roy Strong becomes Director of the Victoria and Albert Museum.
- Hallwalls, a non profit exhibition space and arts organization, is established in a converted ice packing warehouse in Buffalo, New York, by the artists Charles Clough, Robert Longo, Diane Bertolo, Nancy Dwyer, Larry Lundy, Cindy Sherman and Michael Zwack.

== Awards ==
- Archibald Prize: Sam Fullbrook – Jockey Norman Stephens
- John Moores Painting Prize - Myles Murphy - "Figure with Yellow Foreground"

== Works ==
- Yaacov Agam - Aménagement de l'antichambre des appartements privés du Palais de l'Elysée pour le président Georges Pompidou (en: Furnishing of the antechamber of the private apartments of the Élysée Palace for President Georges Pompidou completed)
- Bruce Beasley – Big Red (sculpture, Eugene, Oregon)
- Salvador Dalí – Nieuw Amsterdam (object/sculpture)
- Judy Dater – Imogen and Twinka at Yosemite (photograph)
- Audrey Flack - Leonardo's Lady (photorealist painting)
- Silvio Gazzaniga – FIFA World Cup Trophy
- David Hockney – Contre-jour in the French style – Against the Day dans le style français
- Nabil Kanso – Vietnam
- Bernard Kirschenbaum – Twist for Max (sculpture)
- Joan Miró
  - Hands flying off toward the constellations
  - The hope of a condemned Man (series)
- Odd Nerdrum – Liberation
- Enzo Plazzotta – Crucifixion
- Tony Rosenthal – 5 in 1 (steel sculpture, New York City)
- Ruskin Spear – Harold Wilson
- Graham Sutherland – Lord Goodman
- Jack Whitten - Sorcerer's Apprentice (painting)
- David Wynne – Boy With a Dolphin (bronze, Cheyne Walk, London)
- Meet the Residents (album cover)

== Films ==
- A Bigger Splash

== Births ==
- 15 May – Kadir Nelson, African American illustrator.
- 31 May – Adrian Tomine, American cartoonist.
- 16 June – Paul Lee, English artist.
- 1 September – Jhonen Vasquez, American comic book artist, cartoonist and writer.
- 8 November – Masashi Kishimoto, Japanese mangaka.
- 13 November – Kerim Seiler, Swiss artist and architect.
- 7 December – Kang Full, South Korean webcomic artist.

=== Full date unknown ===
- Banksy, English graffiti artist.
- Bogna Burska, Polish playwright and visual artist.
- Amelie Chabannes, French painter and sculptor.
- Luke Jerram, British installation artist.
- Fabrice Lachant, French photographer.
- OSGEMEOS (Otavio and Gustavo Pandolfo), Brazilian twin graffiti artists.
- Dulce Pinzon, Mexican-born visual artist.
- Bojan Šarčević, Bosnian-French visual artist.
- Bedwyr Williams, Welsh installation and performance artist.

== Deaths ==
=== January to June ===
- 19 January – Edward Seago, English painter (b. 1910).
- 30 January – Robert Darwin, English painter and Rector of the Royal College of Art (b. 1910)
- 15 February – Petar Lubarda, Serbian painter (b. 1907).
- 4 March – Adolph Gottlieb, American abstract expressionist painter and sculptor (b. 1903).
- 9 March – Daniel O'Neill, Irish painter (b. 1920).
- 5 April – A. Y. Jackson, Canadian painter (b. 1882).
- 31 May – Juan Bautista Garcia, Puerto Rican painter (b. 1904).
- 7 June
  - Émilie Charmy, French artist (b. 1878)
  - Milton Menasco, American painter and art director (b. 1890).
- 22 June – Alain Saint-Ogan, French comics author and artist (b. 1895).
- 30 June – Frank McKelvey, Irish painter (b. 1895).

=== July to December ===
- 9 July – Georges Ribemont-Dessaignes, French writer and artist (b. 1884).
- 8 August – Charles Wheeler, English sculptor (b. 1892).
- 11 August – Jan Tschichold, German typographer, book designer, teacher and writer (b. 1902).
- August – André Edouard Marty, French artist (b. 1882).
- 8 September – James Swinnerton, American cartoonist and artist (b. 1875).
- 17 September – André Dunoyer de Segonzac, French painter and graphic artist (b. 1884).
- 26 October - William C. Seitz, American art curator (MoMA) and museum director (Rose Art Museum) (b. 1914).
- 28 October – David Jones, English poet and painter (b. 1895).
- 1 November – František Muzika, Czech avant-garde painter (b. 1900).
- 20 December – Risto Stijović, Serbian sculptor (b. 1894).
- 21 December – James Henry Govier, English painter (b. 1910).
- 25 December – Harry Kernoff, Irish painter (b. 1900).

== See also ==
- 1974 in Fine Arts of the Soviet Union
