= Mother and Child =

Mother and Child may refer to:

== Art ==
- Mother and Child (Gordine), a 1964 public artwork by Dora Gordine
- Mother & Child (Etrog), an abstract sculpture by Sorel Etrog
- Mother and Child (Cassatt), a painting by Mary Cassatt
- Mère et enfant, a 1902 painting by Pablo Picasso (National Galleries of Scotland)
- Mother and Child, a 1902 painting by Gustav Klimt, more commonly known as The Three Ages of Woman
- Mère et enfant, a 1907 painting by Pablo Picasso (Musée Picasso)

== Film and TV ==
- Mother and Child (1924 film), a German silent film starring Henny Porten
- Mother and Child (1934 film), a German sound remake also starring Porten
- Mother and Child (2009 film), an American drama film directed and written by Rodrigo García
- "Mother and Child" (Sliders), a television episode
- "Mother and Child", an episode of Ghost in the Shell: Stand Alone Complex

== Music ==
- Mother and Child (Tavener), a 2002 choral composition by John Tavener
- Mother and Child (song cycle), composed in 1918 by John Ireland on poems by Cristina Rossetti
- Mother and Child, an album by Tenebrae
- ”Mother and Child", a song by David Sylvian from Secrets of the Beehive

== See also ==
- Madonna and Child, a representation of Mary and the baby Jesus
- "Mother and Child Reunion", a song by Paul Simon on his 1972 album Paul Simon
- "Mother and Child Reunion" (Degrassi: The Next Generation), two-part pilot episode of the Canadian teen drama television series Degrassi: The Next Generation
- Mother and Child Scheme (AKA Mother and Child Service), a former healthcare programme in Ireland
