= Joan Miró: The Ladder of Escape =

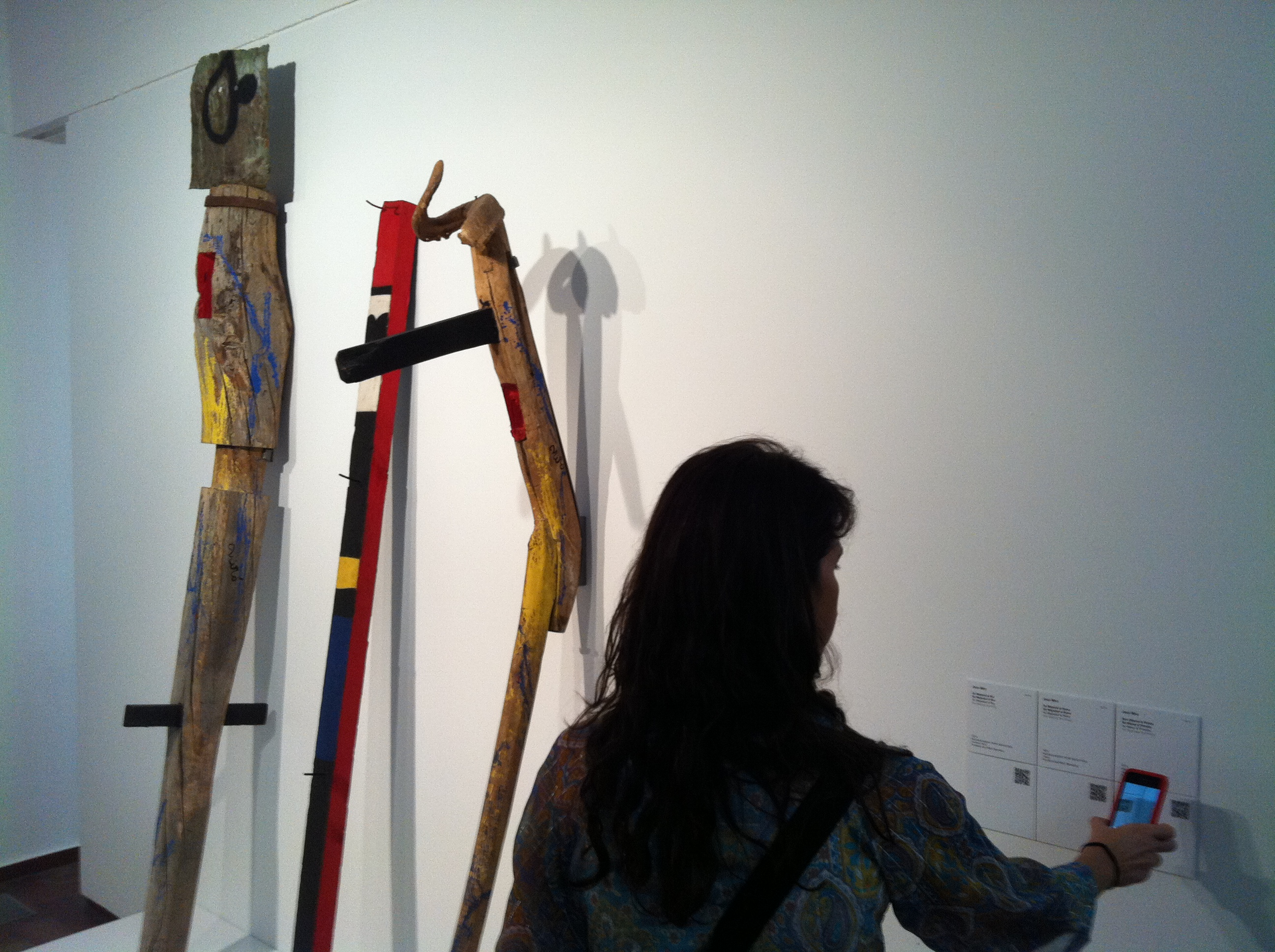
His Majesty the King, Her Majesty the Queen and His Highness the Prince: three sculptures that were in the exhibition

Joan Miró: The Ladder of Escape was an exhibition organized by the Joan Miró Foundation in Barcelona in collaboration with the Tate Modern in London. The exhibition was at "The Tate" from April to September 2011. before moving to the Joan Miró Foundation to open in October 2011 until March 2012 and later to the National Gallery of Art in Washington DC from May to August 2012. This exhibition brought together 170 works – paintings, sculptures and drawings by Miró from public and private collections around the world.

The exhibition highlights the artist's engagement with his time and his country. Joan Miró was one of the most important artists of the 20th century. He created a Surrealist language of symbols following his own imagined fantasies and the use of bright colours. His life and work are intertwined with the history of Spain and Catalonia in the twentieth century.

== Description ==
The exhibition looks at the artist's life in chronological order starting with Joan Miró's links with his home in Mont-roig del Camp and his initial contact with the surrealist poets and painters. Early works include The Farm and Head of a Catalan Peasant. His 1926 work Dog Barking at the Moon has been considered to have symbols based on his emerging surrealist ideas although others have interpreted the young dog barking at a ladder as symbolizing Miró's ambition.

Later works show his reaction to the Spanish Civil War which included his Barcelona Series. At that time the artist accepted a commission from the Government of the Republic, and painted the stamp Aidez l'Espagne and The Reaper (Catalan peasant in revolt) for the Spanish Pavilion of the Republic of the Paris International Exhibition of 1937, works displayed next to Guernica by Pablo Picasso . The Second World War resulted in many new images and a large number were included from his Constellations series.

The final area of the exhibition examines the years of the late Francoism. Works from this period are shown as the triptych The Hope of a Condemned Man and May 1968. The exhibition was criticised for failing to include Miró's qualifications for being a leading Surrealist.

== Features ==
When the exhibition was in Barcelona, there was a nearby exhibition of the artist's posters. The main exhibition was supported by using QRpedia codes that allowed visitors to access Wikipedia in Catalan, Russian, English and several other languages.

On the occasion of the American venue, the Film Department - Department of Exhibition programs produced with the support of the HRH Foundation the documentary Joan Miró: The Ladder of Escape.
