= Franklin D. Murphy Sculpture Garden =

Hammer Museum facility at UCLA

Coordinates: 34°04′30.30″N 118°26′24.24″W

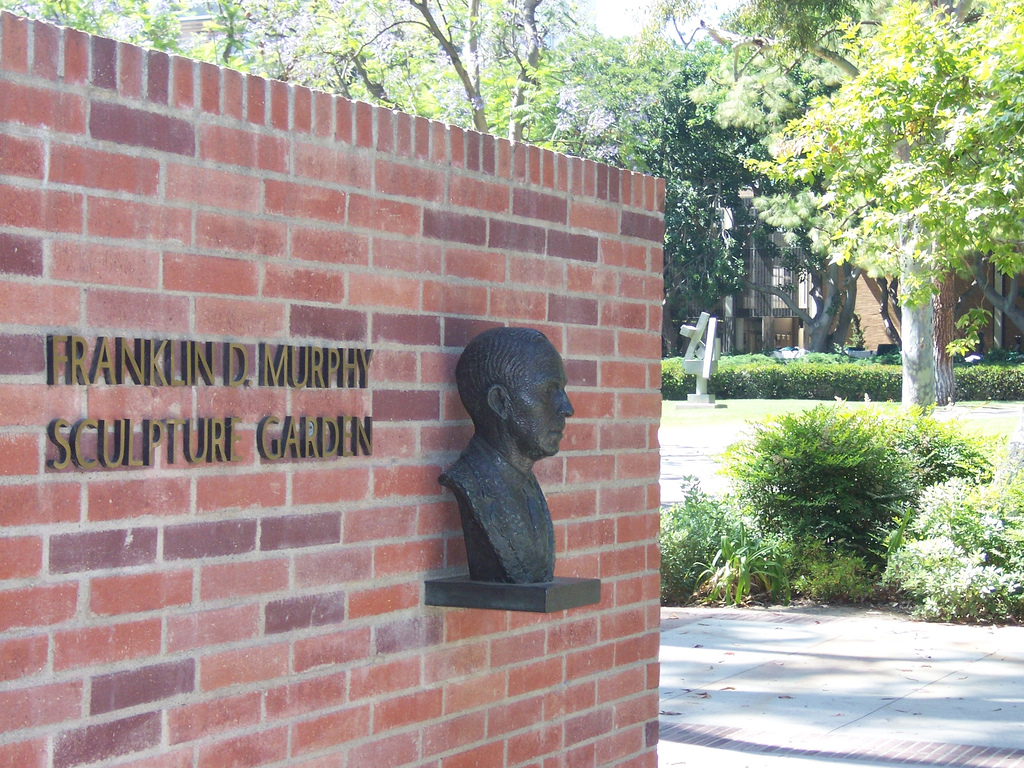
Entrance to the sculpture garden

The Franklin D. Murphy Sculpture Garden is a garden located on the campus of the University of California, Los Angeles. It is run by the Hammer Museum.

The sculpture garden was founded in 1967. It spans more than five acres and has more than 70 international sculptures, by figural and abstract artists such as Jean Arp, Deborah Butterfield, Alexander Calder, Alberto Burri, Barbara Hepworth, Jacques Lipchitz, Henry Moore, Isamu Noguchi, Auguste Rodin, David Smith, Claire Falkenstein, Gaston Lachaise, Henri Matisse, Francisco Zúñiga, and others.

== List of the sculptures ==
- Oliver Andrews, Architectural Sculpture, 1966
- Alexander Archipenko, Queen of Sheba, 1961
- Jean Arp, Fruit Hybrid dit la Pagode (Hybrid Fruit Called Pagoda), 1934
- Jean Arp, Ptolémée III (Ptolemy III), 1961
- Leonard Baskin, Prophet: Homage to Rico Lebrun, 1971
- Fletcher Benton, Dynamic Rhythms Orange (Phase III), 1976
- Emile-Antoine Bourdelle, Les Nobles Fardeaux (Noble Burdens), 1910
- Emile-Antoine Bourdelle, Tête de la France (Head of France), 1925
- Alberto Burri, Grande Cretto Nero (Large Black Cracks), 1976–77
- Deborah Butterfield, Pensive, c. 1997
- Alexander Calder, Button Flower, 1959
- Anthony Caro, Halfway, 1971
- Aldo Casanova, Artemis of Ephesus, 1964–66
- Lynn Chadwick, Encounter VIII, 1957
- Leo Cherne, Ralph J. Bunche, 1958
- Pietro Consagra, Colloquio Duro (Difficult Dialogue), 1959
- Sorel Etrog, War Remembrance, 1960–61
- Sorel Etrog, Mother and Child, 1962–64
- Claire Falkenstein, Point as a Set No. 25, 1970
- Eric Gill, Mulier, c. 1912
- Robert Graham, Dance Columns I and II, 1978
- Dimitri Hadzi, Elmo III, 1960
- Dimitri Hadzi, Elmo V, 1959–61
- Barbara Hepworth, Oval Form (Trezion), 1961–63
- Barbara Hepworth, Elegy III (Hollow Form with Color), 1966
- Richard Hunt, Why?, 1974
- Gaston Lachaise, Standing Woman (Heroic Woman), 1932
- Henri Laurens, Automne (Autumn), 1948
- Jacques Lipchitz, Baigneuse (Bather), 1923–25
- Jacques Lipchitz, Le chant des voyelles (The Song of the Vowels), 1931–32
- Anna Mahler, Tower of Masks, 1961
- Anna Mahler, Night, 1963
- Aristide Maillol, Tête héroïque (Heroic Head), 1923
- Aristide Maillol, Torso, c. 1938
- Gerhard Marcks, Maja, 1941
- Gerhard Marcks, Freya, 1950
- Henri Matisse, Bas Relief I-IV (The Back Series), 1909–1930
- Joan Miró, Mère Ubu, 1975
- Henry Moore, Two-Piece Reclining Figure, No.3, 1961
- Robert Muller, Autel (Altar), 1962–64
- Reuben Nakian, La chambre a coucher de l'empereur (The Emperor's Bedchamber), 1954
- Isamu Noguchi, Garden Elements, 1962
- George Rickey, Two Lines Oblique Down (Variation III), 1970–74
- Giorgio Amelio Roccamonte, Abstraction, 1963
- Auguste Rodin, L'homme qui marche (The Walking Man), 1878 and 1899–1900, enlarged 1905–07, currently under renovation.
- Tony (Bernard) Rosenthal, Abstract Plaque, 1964
- Richard Serra, T.E.U.C.L.A., 2006
- David Smith, Cubi XX, 1964
- Francesco Somaini, Verticale-Assalonne (Vertical-Absalom), 1959
- Elden Tefft, Franklin D. Murphy, 1960
- George Tsutakawa, Obos 69, 1969
- William Tucker, Untitled, 1967
- William Turnbull, Column, 1970
- Vladas Vildžiūnas, The Bird Goddess, 1977
- Peter Voulkos, Soleares, c. 1959
- Peter Voulkos, Gallas Rock, 1960
- Jack Zajac, Ram Head with Broken Horn, VI, 1963
- Jack Zajac, Bound Goat, Wednesday, 1973
- William Zorach, Victory, 1950
- Francisco Zúñiga, Desnudo Reclinado (Reclining Nude), 1970
- Francisco Zúñiga, Madre con niño en la cadera (Mother with Child at Her Hip), 1979
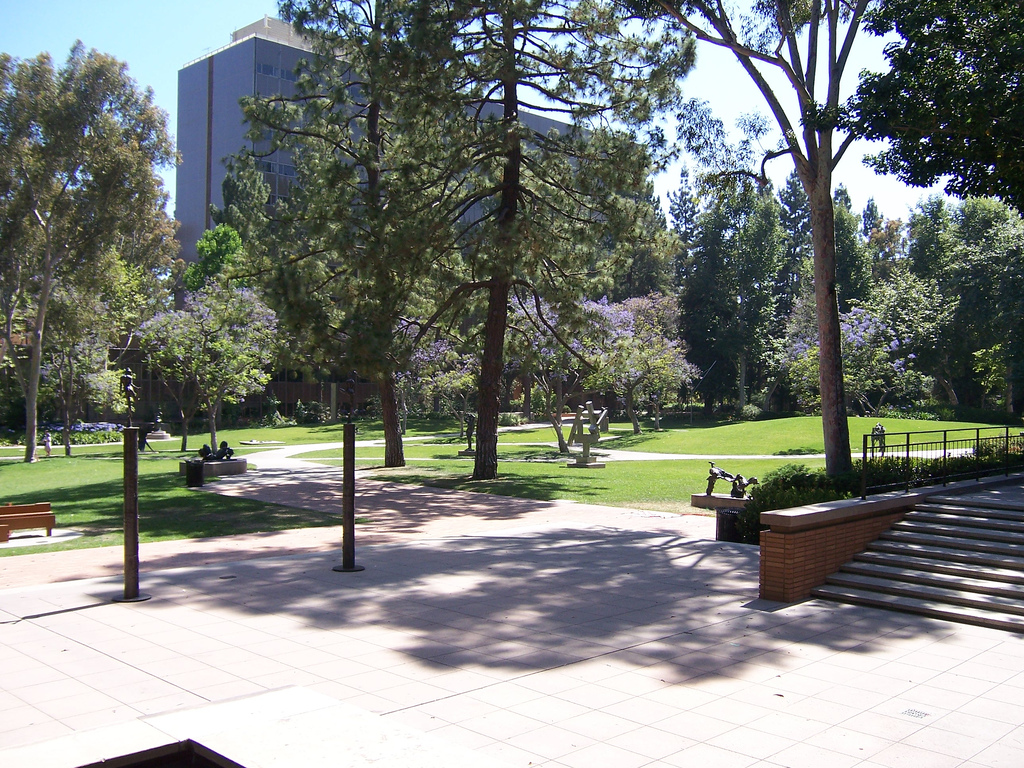
A view of the garden

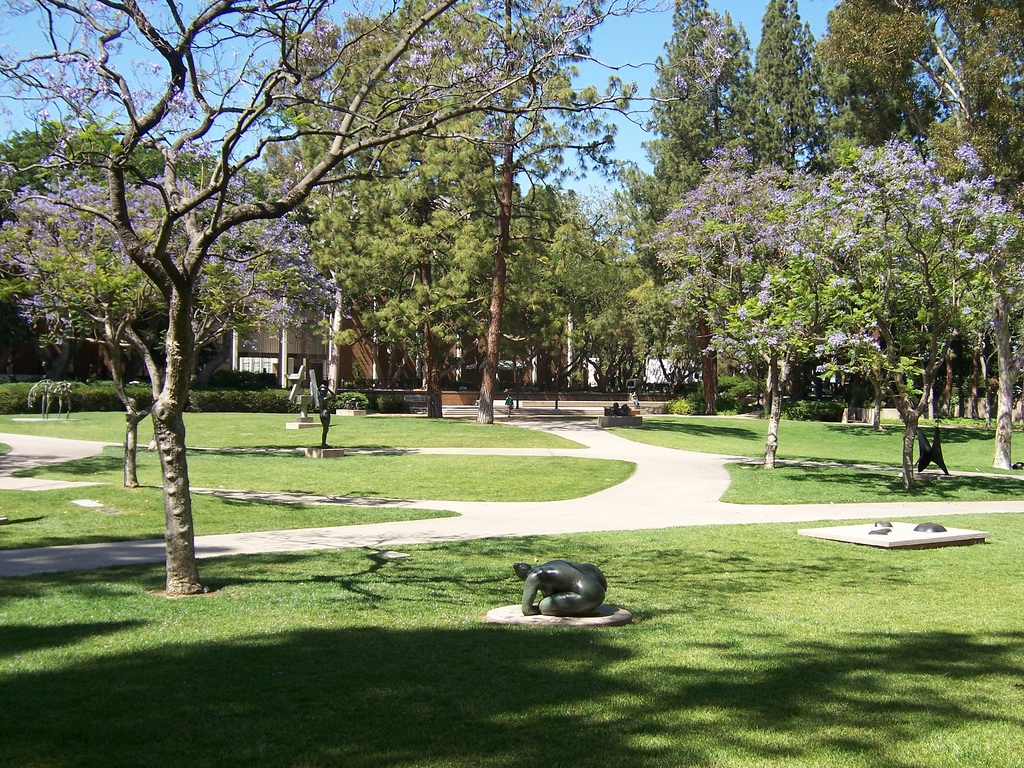
Another view of the garden

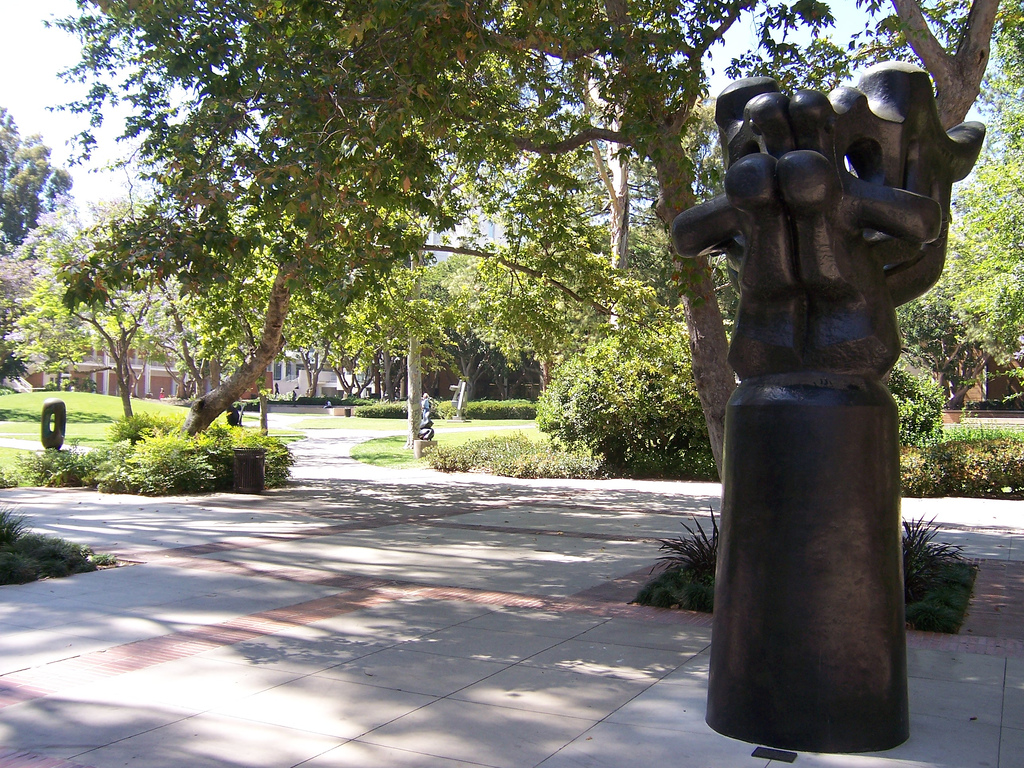
Jacques Lipchitz: Song of the Vowels

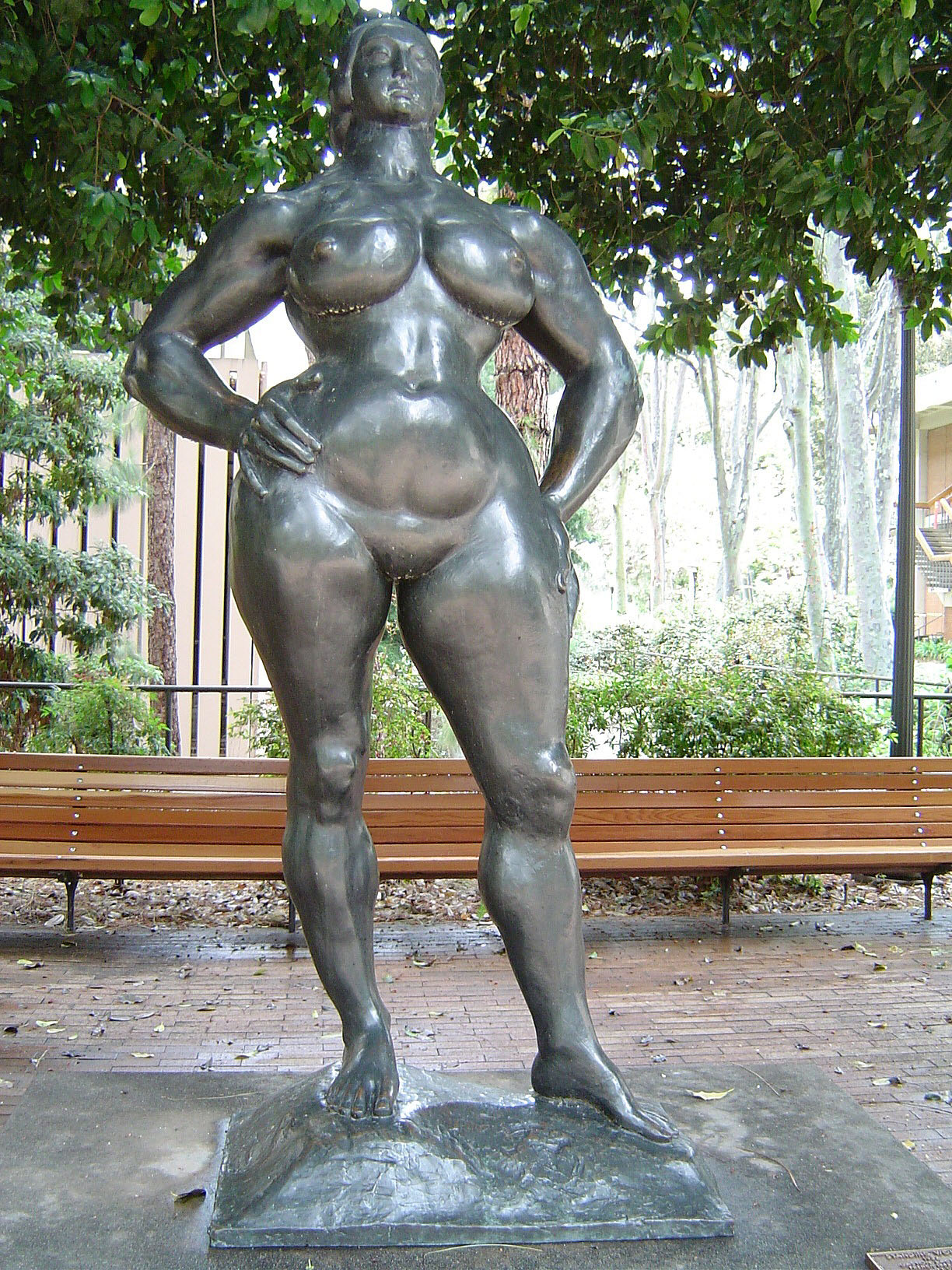
Gaston Lachaise: Standing Woman
