= The Navigator's Hope =

Series of paintings by Joan Miró

The Navigator's Hope 1
- Artist: Joan Miró
- Year: 1968-73
- Type: series

The Navigator's Hope is a series of paintings made by Joan Miró between 1968 and 1973, half of which now belong to the permanent collection of the Fundació Joan Miró in Barcelona, thanks to a donation by Pilar Juncosa. The rest of the series are preserved in various private collections.

== History ==
The series The navigator's hope does not appear to have a direct connection with the life of the artist. Similar Miró works at similar times were clearly linked to contemporary events. For instance, The Hope of a Condemned Man was linked with the condemnation and execution of the revolutionary Salvador Puig Antich by General Franco's government, or his so-called burned paintings that may have been a reflection of the revolutionary events of May 1968.

Between 1968 and 1973 Miró was in Mallorca. He consolidated his style and renewed his interest in Eastern culture as well as other interests. Jacques Dupin speaks of the influence that Japanese art had on Miró because he sees the lines as calligraphic gestures on patches of intense color. As explained Pilar Cabañas in Universidad Complutense de Madrid, this influence was reciprocal, and came from far away. During the Surrealist Exhibition held in Tokyo in 1937, the Japanese artist Shuzo Takiguchi wrote the first critical Japanese Miró. The two artists met and expressed their desire to establish some sort of collaboration but due to personal problems and Takiguchi's precarious state of health, this collaboration did not materialize until 1967, just a year before the first work of the series The navigator's hope. That year, the catalogue of the exhibition of Miró's Maeght gallery several poems are illustrated by Miró himself, including a Takiguchi. During the following years and until the mid seventies, Miró and Takiguchi collaborated on several occasions.

== Series ==
Register	Work	Date	Format	Size (cm)	Museum	City	Ref.
	The Navigator's Hope I	1968	Oil on canvas	24.5 × 41 cm	Foundation	Barcelona	
	The Navigator's Hope II	1968	Oil on canvas	24 × 41 cm	Private Collection	ND	
	The Navigator's Hope III	1973	Oil on canvas	24.5 × 41 cm	Foundation	Barcelona	
	The Navigator's Hope IV	1973	Oil on canvas	24.8 × 41 cm	Foundation	Barcelona	
	The Navigator's Hope V	1973	Oil on canvas	24.5 × 41 cm	Private Collection	ND	
	The Navigator's Hope VI	1973	Oil on canvas	24.3 × 41 cm	Foundation	Barcelona	
	The Navigator's Hope VII	1973	Oil on canvas	24.5 × 41 cm	Private Collection	ND	
	The Navigator's Hope VIII	1973	Oil on canvas	24 × 41 cm	Private Collection	ND	

== Analysis ==
According to Dupin, in these works show a technique that Miró repeated often during 1968. The pictures were characterized by colourful graphics on a black or dark background. There are obvious similarities between the first two examples of the series The navigator's hope, corresponding to 1968, and the artist's work The hope of a condemned Man, especially in the gesture and the use of the relationship between figure and background. In contrast, other works of the series, corresponding to 1973, are much closer to the play La Chanson des voyelles, painted in 1966, kept in MoMA in New York City. Unlike Miró was used as the black paint on the Spanish Civil War as the black loses the drama that had reached and becomes a collection of subtle nuances which are displayed on lines and rounded shapes and white colors. In the latest works by increasing the number of thick lines, the black backgrounds are offset by large masses of color that gained prominence and the stroke is close to the Eastern calligraphy.

"If, at any given time, (Miro) has placed a red spot, you can be sure it was there and not elsewhere, which had to be .... Take it, and the box falls

— Matisse
