= Black cube =

Black cube may refer to:

- Alamo (sculpture), a black cube sculpture in New York City
- Blackballing, a secret voting process where the balls are substituted with a black cube in Freemason lodge voting practices
- Black Cube, a private intelligence agency
- The Kaaba, a black cubical building at the center of the Grand Mosque of Mecca which contains the Black Stone; it is the most sacred site in Islam
- Steam Machine (2026), a gaming computer designed as a black cube
- Tefillin, a small black leather cube used by Jews during prayer
