= Her Majesty the Queen (Miró) =

Sculpture by Joan Miró

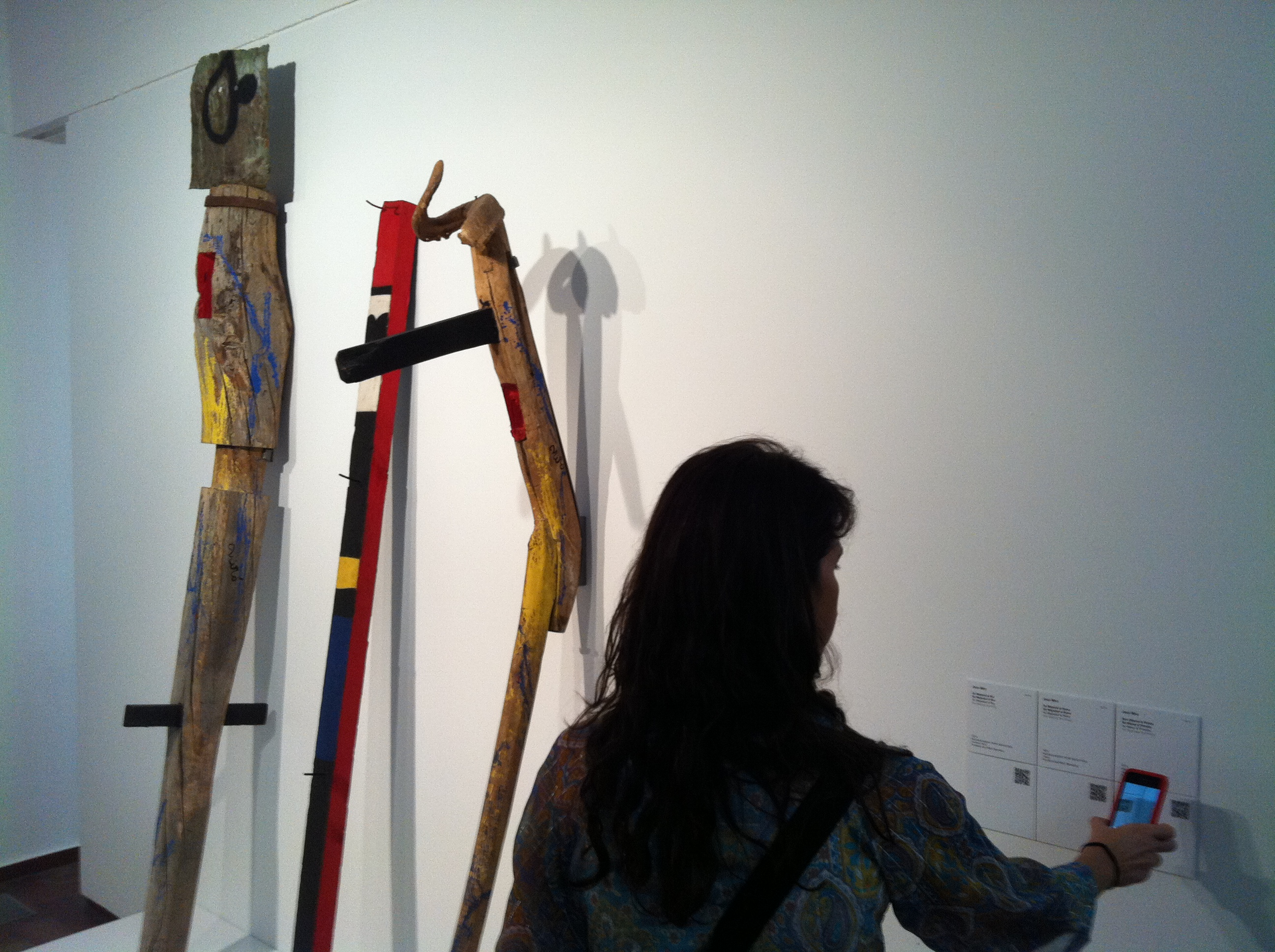
- Artist: Joan Miró
- Year: 1974
- Medium: sculpture, found object
- Dimensions: 210 cm × 9.3 cm × 12.5 cm (83 in × 3.7 in × 4.9 in)
- Location: Fundació Joan Miró, Barcelona

Her Majesty the Queen is an object-sculpture made by Joan Miró in 1974. It is and held at the Joan Miró Foundation, in Barcelona.

== Background ==
Her Majesty the Queen, with His Highness the Prince and His Majesty the King are part of a series of sculptures made in 1974. During that year a major retrospective of his work was shown at both the Grand Palais and the Museé d'Art Moderne, in Paris. In Pasis there were three works exhibited for the first time.

The exhibition Magnetic Fields had been held two years before at the Guggenheim Museum in New York City and Miró bronzes at the Hayward Gallery in London. This was made at the same time as the construction of the Joan Miró Foundation in Barcelona, which opened to the public on 10 June 1975. The international artistic recognition contrasts with the difficult situation in Spain during the last years of the dictatorship. In February of the same year Miró had painted the triptych The Hope of a Condemned Man. This painting concerned the conviction of the activist Salvador Puig Antich, who was finally executed by garrotte on 2 March 1974. Juan Carlos de Borbón, then Prince of Spain and five years old had sworn allegiance to Francisco Franco as his future head of the state.

Miró had created artworks that were critical of the concept of authority, based on the fictional character Ubu Roi back in 1941 and in 1966. These works about bombastic celebrities contrasts with the humility of the materials that he used.

After Franco had died, Miró talked about the civic responsibility of the artist during his acceptance speech for an Honorary degree at the University of Barcelona in 1979:

I understand that an artist is someone who, among the silence of others, uses his voice to say something, and it is required that this thing is not something useless but useful to service people.

— Joan Miró, October 2, 1979

== 2011 exhibition ==
The exhibition L'escala de l'evasió that opened in October 2011 was supported by access to Wikipedia using QRpedia codes that allowed access to visitors in Catalan, English and several other languages.
