= Reflections of a Summer Day =

Sculpture in Eugene, Oregon, U.S.

- The sculpture in 2015
- Artist: Duane Loppnow
- Year: 1974
- Type: Sculpture
- Medium: Painted steel
- Dimensions: 2.0 m × 1.2 m × 1.2 m (6.5 ft × 4 ft × 4 ft)
- Condition: "Treatment needed" (1994)
- Location: Eugene, Oregon, United States; 44.04464°N 123.07655°W

Reflections of a Summer Day is an outdoor 1974 painted steel sculpture by Duane Loppnow, installed near the entrance to the Jordan Schnitzer Museum of Art on the University of Oregon campus in Eugene, Oregon, in the United States. The sculpture was given to the University of Oregon by the sculptor, a graduate of the university.

The abstract (geometric) sculpture measures approximately 6.5 feet (2.0 m) x 4 feet (1.2 m) x 4 feet (1.2 m) and rests on a base that measures approximately 1.5 feet (0.46 m) x 1 foot (0.30 m) x 2 feet (0.61 m). Its condition was deemed "treatment needed" when the Smithsonian Institution surveyed the work as part of its "Save Outdoor Sculpture!" program in 1994.

== See also ==
- 1974 in art
