= Endover =

Sculpture at University of Michigan

- The Cube
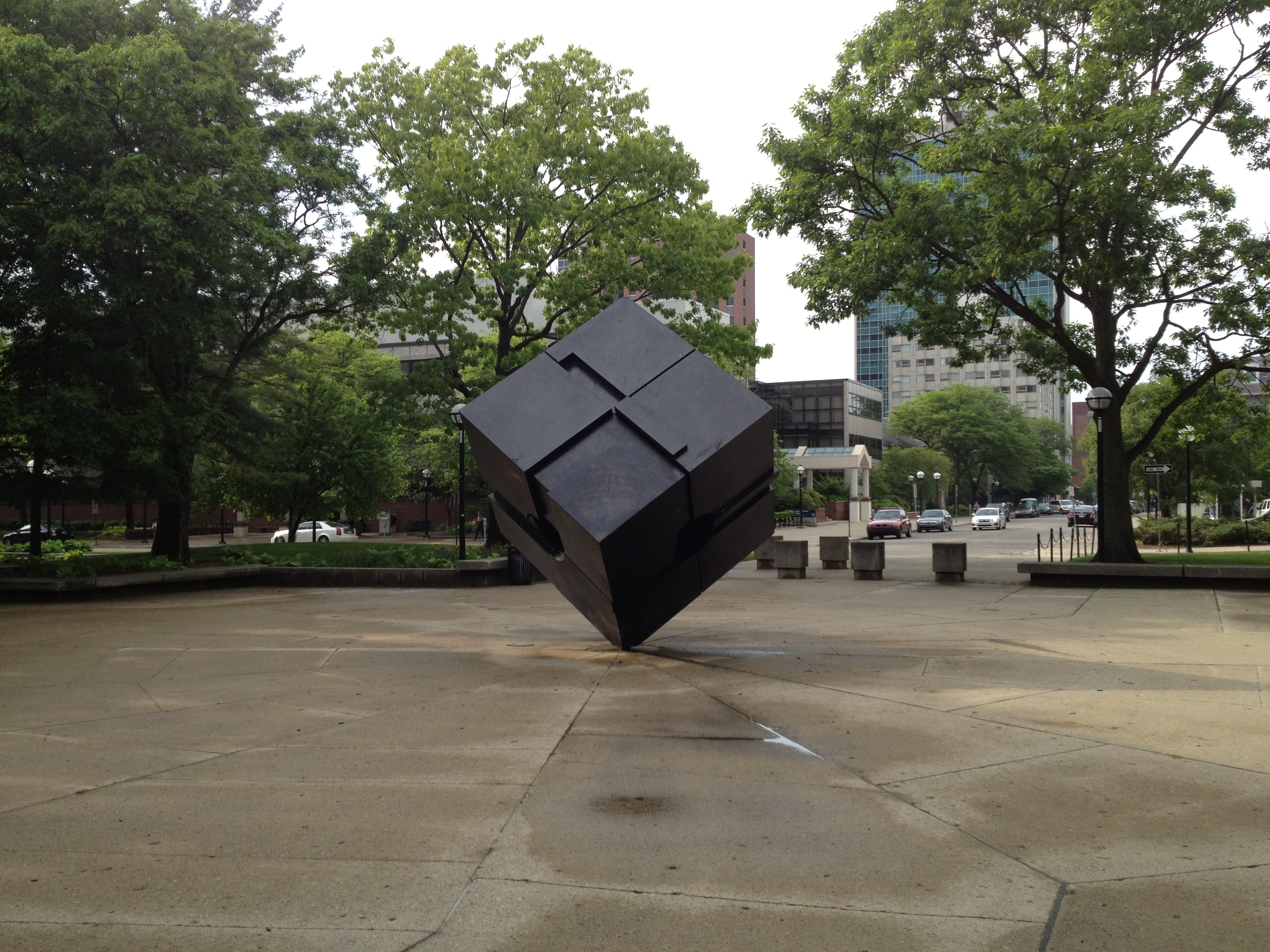
- Artist: Tony Rosenthal
- Year: 1968
- Medium: Painted CorTen steel
- Dimensions: 4.6 m × 4.6 m × 4.6 m (15 ft × 15 ft × 15 ft)
- Weight: 2,400 pounds (1,100 kg)
- Location: Regents Plaza, Ann Arbor, Michigan
- 42°16′33″N 83°44′31″W
- Owner: University of Michigan

Endover, popularly known as The Cube, is an interactive sculpture on the campus of the University of Michigan in Ann Arbor, Michigan. Endover is one of a series of monumental cubes in CorTen steel by American abstract sculptor Tony Rosenthal, which also includes Alamo in the East Village of New York.

== Description ==
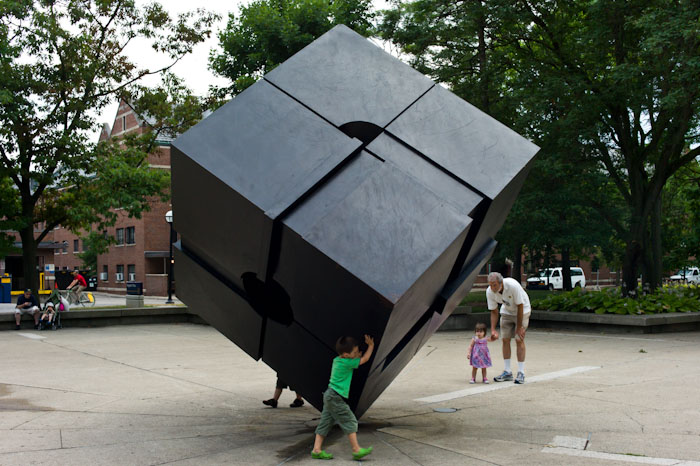
Endover's mounting mechanism allows the sculpture to spin with ease

Endover is a 15 ft × 15 ft × 15 ft (4.6 m × 4.6 m × 4.6 m) cube, fabricated in black-painted CorTen steel, mounted on its corner. Each face of the cube is divided into four approximately equal quadrants, The cube's mounting mechanism allows the 2,400 lb (1,100 kg) sculpture to spin with relative ease. The Endover cube's pivot is sunken into the ground, as opposed to the pivot of the similar Alamo, which is on a separate platform.

Endover is permanently installed in Regents' Plaza on the university's Central Campus, adjacent to the Michigan Union, and is open to the public.

== History ==
American abstract sculptor Tony Rosenthal (1914–2009), a 1936 graduate of the University of Michigan, created the first of his series of monumental cubes in 1967. Alamo was installed in Astor Place in downtown Manhattan, and was intended to be a temporary installation. Alamo proved to be popular, and was kept in Astor Place. Alamo spins, a feature that was not intended by Rosenthal, but which is appreciated by the public and the artist alike.

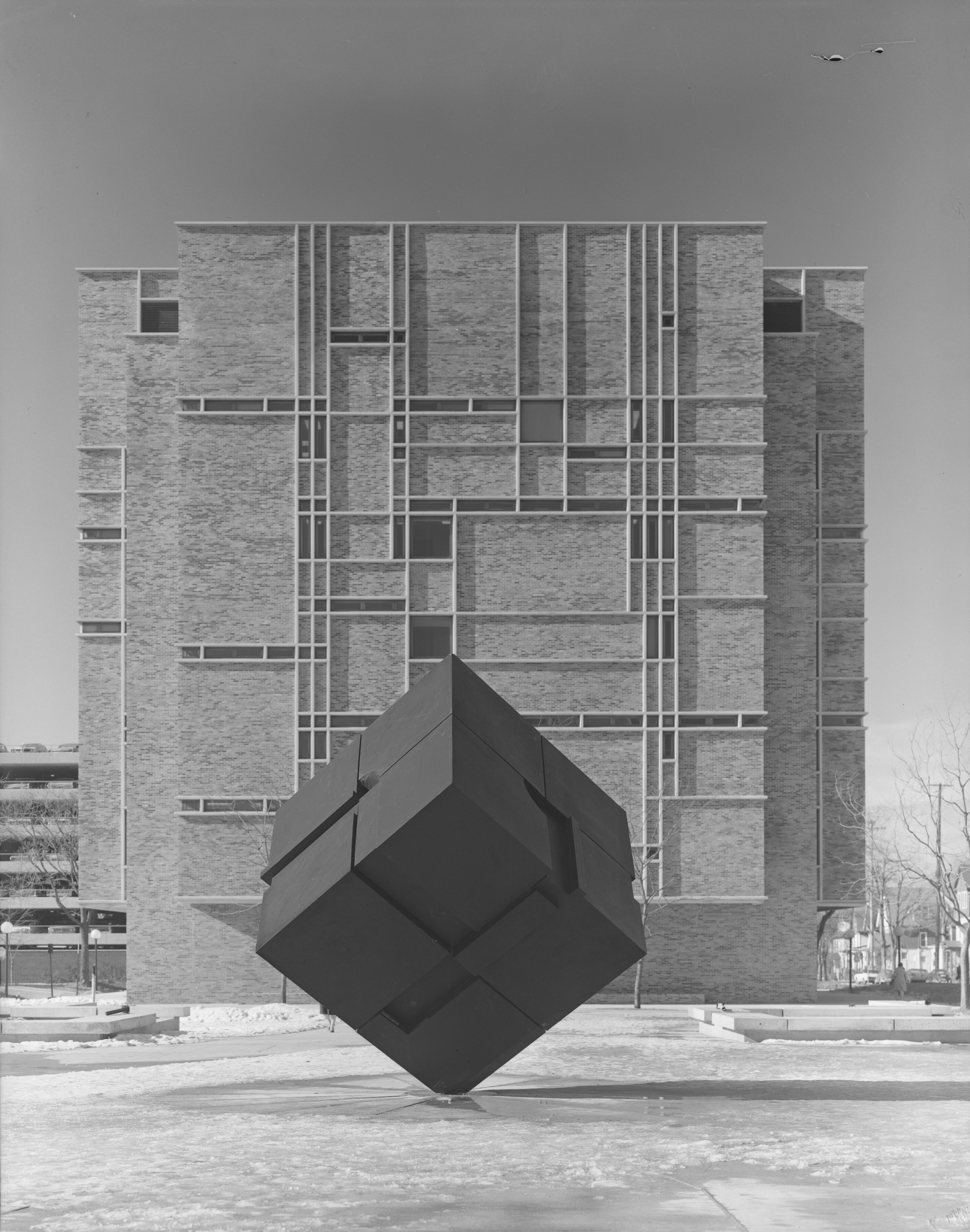
Endover in front of the Fleming Administration Building, photographed by Balthazar Korab circa 1968

The popularity of Alamo, which was planned to be relocated to Ann Arbor after a six-month installation, resulted in the commissioning of a new sculpture in its place. The initially unnamed cube is a refinement of Alamo, with a revolving mechanism that allows the sculpture to spin more easily than its counterpart in New York. Endover is a gift to the university from the Class of 1965 and the sculptor. The cube was installed in Regents' Plaza in 1968.

Endover was removed from public display from 2018 to 2019, due to the renovation of the adjacent Michigan Union.

== See also ==
- Alamo (sculpture)
