= Encounter (sculpture) =

Sculpture in Eugene, Oregon, U.S.

- The sculpture, shown from the side, in 2021
- Artist: Bruce Beasley
- Year: 2003–2004
- Type: Sculpture
- Medium: Bronze
- Location: Eugene, Oregon, United States; 44.04462°N 123.07678°W

Encounter is an outdoor 2003–2004 painted or treated bronze sculpture by Bruce Beasley, installed in Jordan Schnitzer Museum of Art's north lawn on the University of Oregon campus in Eugene, Oregon, in the United States. According to Beasley, the work's base blocks represent the institution's "foundation – the faculty, library, and research facilities", while its upper blocks symbolize university "activities – learning, questioning, and exposure to arts and ideas". It was funded by the 1% for Art program.

== See also ==
- 2004 in art
