= His Majesty the King (Miró) =

Sculpture by Joan Miró

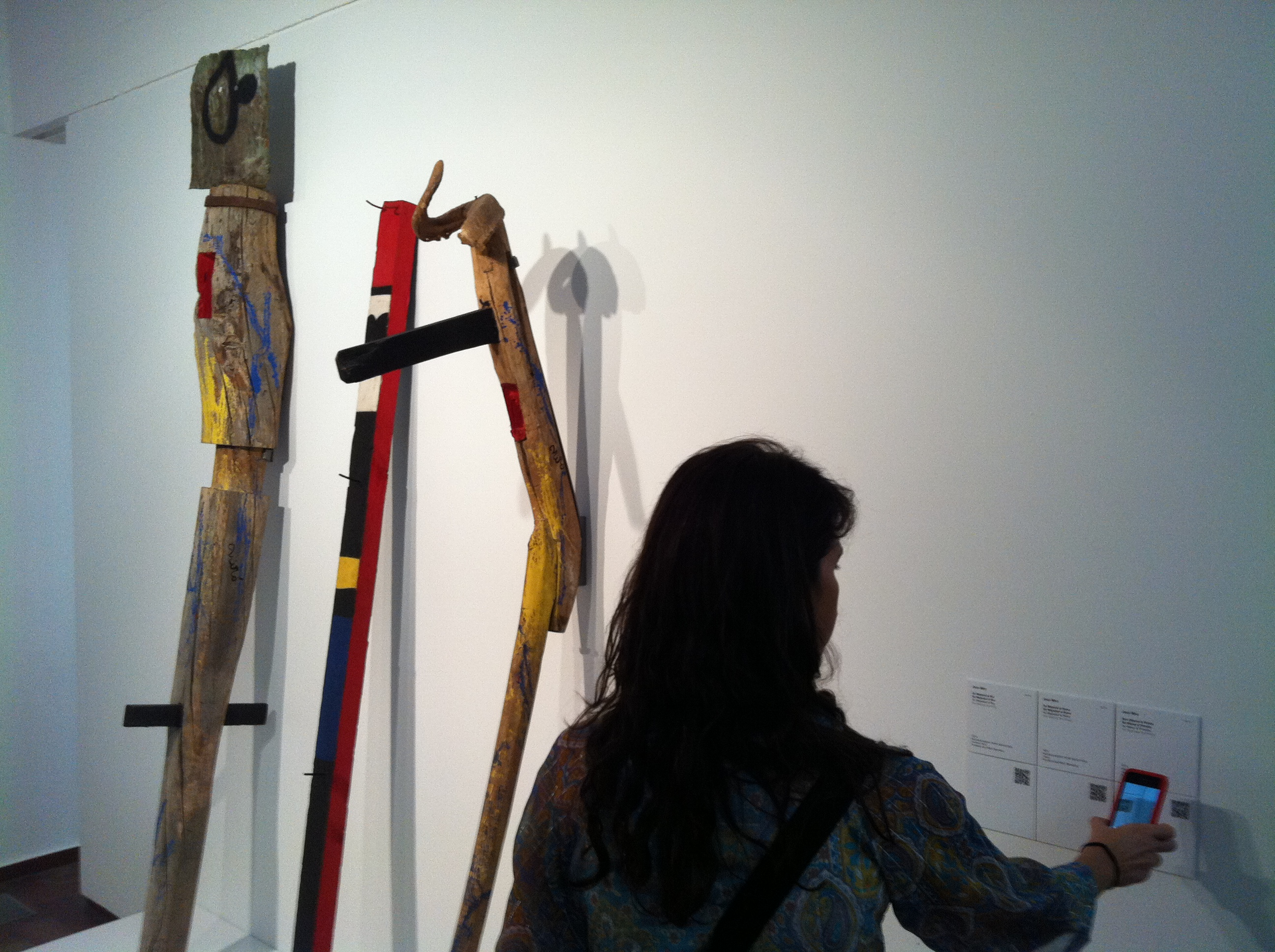
- Artist: Joan Miró
- Year: 1974
- Medium: sculpture, found object
- Dimensions: 254 cm × 22.5 cm × 43 cm (100 in × 8.9 in × 17 in)
- Location: Fundació Joan Miró, Barcelona

His Majesty the King is a sculpture-object made by Joan Miró in 1974. It is held at collection of the Fundació Joan Miró, in Barcelona.

== History ==
Miró lived to see the fall of the Falange regime after the death of Francisco Franco in 1975, along with the transition to democracy in Spain.

In his acceptance speech for an honorary doctorate from the University of Barcelona in 1979, Miró discussed the civic responsibility of the artist: "I understand that an artist is someone who, in the midst of others’ silence, uses his own voice to say something and who makes sure that what he says is not useless, but something that is useful to mankind."

== Description ==
His Majesty the King, along with Her Majesty the Queen and His Highness the Prince are part of a series of sculptures composed—as was often the case with Miró—from found objects. The everyday origins of the items comprising the sculptures implicitly contradict the majesty of the works' titles.

The creative activity, artistic expression in Joan Miró is an experience closely related to their physical and social environment. The roots in the earth to the cosmos, the objects everyday, simple, often linked to rural areas, are sources of inspiration to stimulate your ability to dream and give a universal work. The found objects, features traditional objects from the peasant environment of Montroig are transformed into sculptures. The choice of these materials by Miró is not aesthetic but is attracted to each object that radiates energy.

We have to stick to the land has been hearing the cry of the earth [...]. Tarragona, Mallorca and Palma Montroig [...]. When I weighed very Mont-Roig. Mallorca is poetry, light [...]. And Catalonia [...]; Auxois is mental strength. Face! The strength plastic.

— Eisner, The Calling of the Earth, page 18

== 2011 exhibition ==
The exhibition L'escala de l'evasió that opened in October 2011 was supported by access to Wikipedia using QRpedia codes that allowed access to visitors in Catalan, English and several other languages.
