= Hands Flying off Toward the Constellations =

1974 painting by Joan Miró

- Mans volant cap a les constel·lacions (Catalan)
- Artist: Joan Miró
- Year: 1974
- Dimensions: 260.5 cm × 681 cm (102.6 in × 268 in)
- Location: Fundació Joan Miró; Barcelona

Hands Flying off Toward the Constellations is a painting by Joan Miró dated 19 January 1974. It is now shown at the Fundació Joan Miró, in Barcelona. The artist gave the work to the Foundation in the same month that it opened to the public on 10 June 1975.

== Background ==
Rosa Maria Malet says of these works:

The painting has the distinctive features of recent works by Miró, where there is abundant use of black and a considerable reduction of other colors in proportion to the black. This together with the apparent indifference in the application of paint on the canvas. With the appearance of dripping and splashing, this work gives great strength and aggressiveness. Aggressive, but there is more in form than content. These works should not be interpreted as a cry of protest, but as a sincere and spontaneous manifestation of feelings of the artist.

— Malet. RM, Joan Miró

As for the technical execution Miró explains himself (as Taillandier reported in 1974)

This method is to dip your finger in the paint is fairly recent. In a photo of my monograph can be seen as I do it. I always use the resource of the fingers. Even spread paint fist, and, rubbing in circles.

— Joan Miró, maintenant je travaille par terre / par Yvon Taillandier proposals recuellis

== Exhibitions ==
- 1974. Paris. Grand Palais.
- 1975. Barcelona. Foundation.

The exhibition L'escala de l'evasió that opened in October 2011 was supported by access to Wikipedia using QRpedia codes that allowed access to visitors in Catalan, English and several other languages.
