= Association of American Editorial Cartoonists =

Professional association

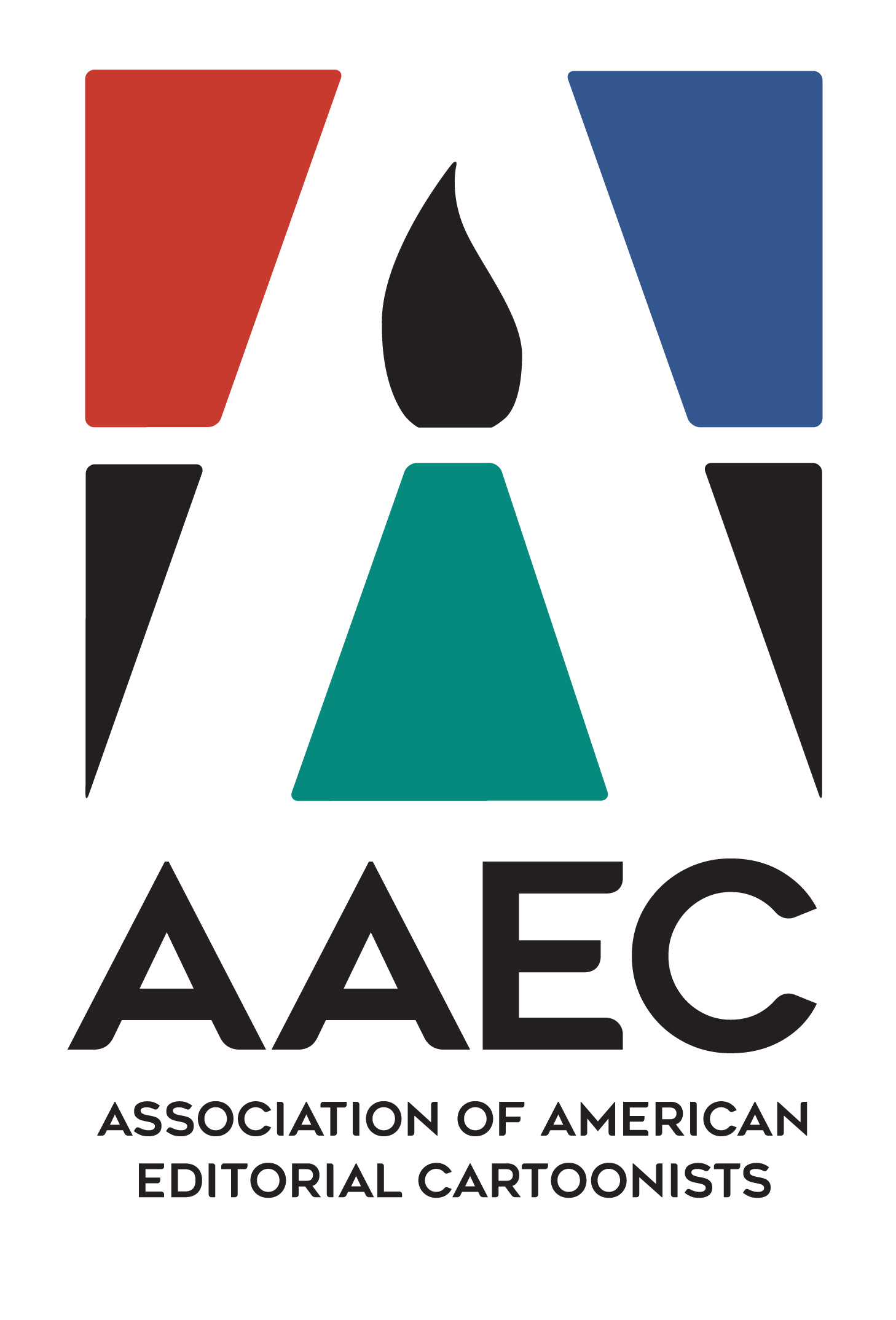
- Formation: 1957; 69 years ago
- Type: Cartoonist organization
- Location: Sacramento, California
- Region served: United States
- Members: Editorial cartoonists
- President: Marc Murphy, Louisville Courier Journal
- Website: editorialcartoonists.com

The Association of American Editorial Cartoonists (AAEC) is a professional association concerned with promoting the interests of staff, freelance and student editorial cartoonists in the United States, Canada and Mexico. With nearly 200 members, it is the world's largest organization of political cartoonists.

The AAEC has filed friend-of-the-court briefs in several cases dealing with freedom of the press, including the 1988 Supreme Court case Flynt v. Falwell (Hustler Magazine v. Falwell). Aside from First Amendment issues, the Association does not take sides in political controversies.

Formed in 1957 by a small group of newspaper cartoonists led by John Stampone of the Army Times, the AAEC was created to promote and stimulate public interest in the editorial page cartoon and to create closer contact among political cartoonists. Each year, the annual AAEC convention is held in a different North American city, allowing cartoonists and other association members—including publishers, writers, historians and collectors—the chance to meet face-to-face, talk shop, and generally kvetch.

== Publications and programs ==
The AAEC follows the publishing industry and member artists through news updates at its web site EditorialCartoonists.com, and in its annual magazine, the Notebook. The AAEC site also offers dozens of new editorial cartoons each day.

The AAEC also sponsors a Cartoons for the Classroom program designed to aid educators at all levels in teaching history, economics, social studies and current events.

== History ==
In 2007, the AAEC met over the 4th of July weekend in Washington D.C. to celebrate its 50th anniversary.

In 2008, AAEC joined over 60 other art licensing businesses (including the Artists Rights Society, Society of Children's Book Writers and Illustrators, the Stock Artists Alliance, Illustrator's Partnership of America and the Advertising Photographers of America, among others) in opposing both The Orphan Works Act of 2008 and The Shawn Bentley Orphan Works Act of 2008. Known collectively as "Artists United Against the U.S. Orphan Works Acts," the diverse organizations joined forces to oppose the bills, which the groups believe "permits, and even encourages, wide-scale infringements while depriving creators of protections currently available under the Copyright Act."

In 2022, in response to the Pulitzer Prize committee replacing the Pulitzer Prize for Editorial Cartooning with the revamped category the Pulitzer Prize for Illustrated Reporting and Commentary, the AAEC "issued a statement calling for the Pulitzer board to reinstate Editorial Cartooning as its own category while also recognizing Illustrated Reporting as a separate form." They wrote:

"Editorial cartoons are quick, in-the-moment commentary, whose artists have to educate themselves on complex issues and craft well-informed opinions in a single take that emphasizes clarity under daily deadlines. Illustrated reporting, or comics journalism, takes days, weeks, or months to craft a story, which can run for pages, and which may or may not be presenting an opinion."

== Awards ==
The AAEC sponsors two awards for cartoonists: the John Locher Memorial Award, given each year to the most promising young cartoonist, age 17-25. The Award was named in honor of the late son of Dick and Mary Locher, who felt the need to establish an award that would not only honor the memory of John Locher but also would help discover young cartoonists and stimulate interest in editorial cartooning among college-age students in North America.

In 2017, the AAEC launched the Rex Babin Memorial Award for Excellence in Local Cartooning, named in honor of the late Sacramento Bee cartoonist, who died of cancer in 2012. As the cartoonist for daily newspapers in two state capitals, Rex Babin saw how effective satire could sometimes be when directed at targets across the street, and often lamented that such work was overlooked by the big industry awards.
