= Stock Artists Alliance =

Founded in 2001, the Stock Artists Alliance was an international trade association of photographers who produce images for stock photography. The mission of SAA was to support and protect the business interests of professional stock photographers with regard to the worldwide distribution of their intellectual property.

As an advocate for its members, SAA encouraged the use of fair contracts and ethical behavior at all levels of the industry. SAA monitored the stock photography industry and served as an ombudsman for its members' interests in dealing with picture agencies and other distribution channels. SAA's first major negotiation was with Getty Images to improve the photographers' contract.

== Affiliation ==
In 2008, SAA joined over 60 other art licensing businesses (including the Artists Rights Society, the Association of American Editorial Cartoonists, Society of Children's Book Writers and Illustrators, Illustrator's Partnership of America and the Advertising Photographers of America, among others) in opposing both The Orphan Works Act of 2008 and The Shawn Bentley Orphan Works Act of 2008. Known collectively as "Artists United Against the U.S. Orphan Works Acts," the diverse organizations joined forces to oppose the bills, which the groups believe "permits, and even encourages, wide-scale infringements while depriving creators of protections currently available under the Copyright Act."

In October 2009 SAA formally became a member of the Alliance of Visual Artists an umbrella organization representing six photographic associations and some 45,000 professional photographers (direct and affiliated members) worldwide, led by Professional Photographers of America

The organization ceased operations in April 2011.

== See also ==
- Midtown Y Photography Gallery
