= His Highness the Prince (Miró) =

Sculpture by Joan Miró

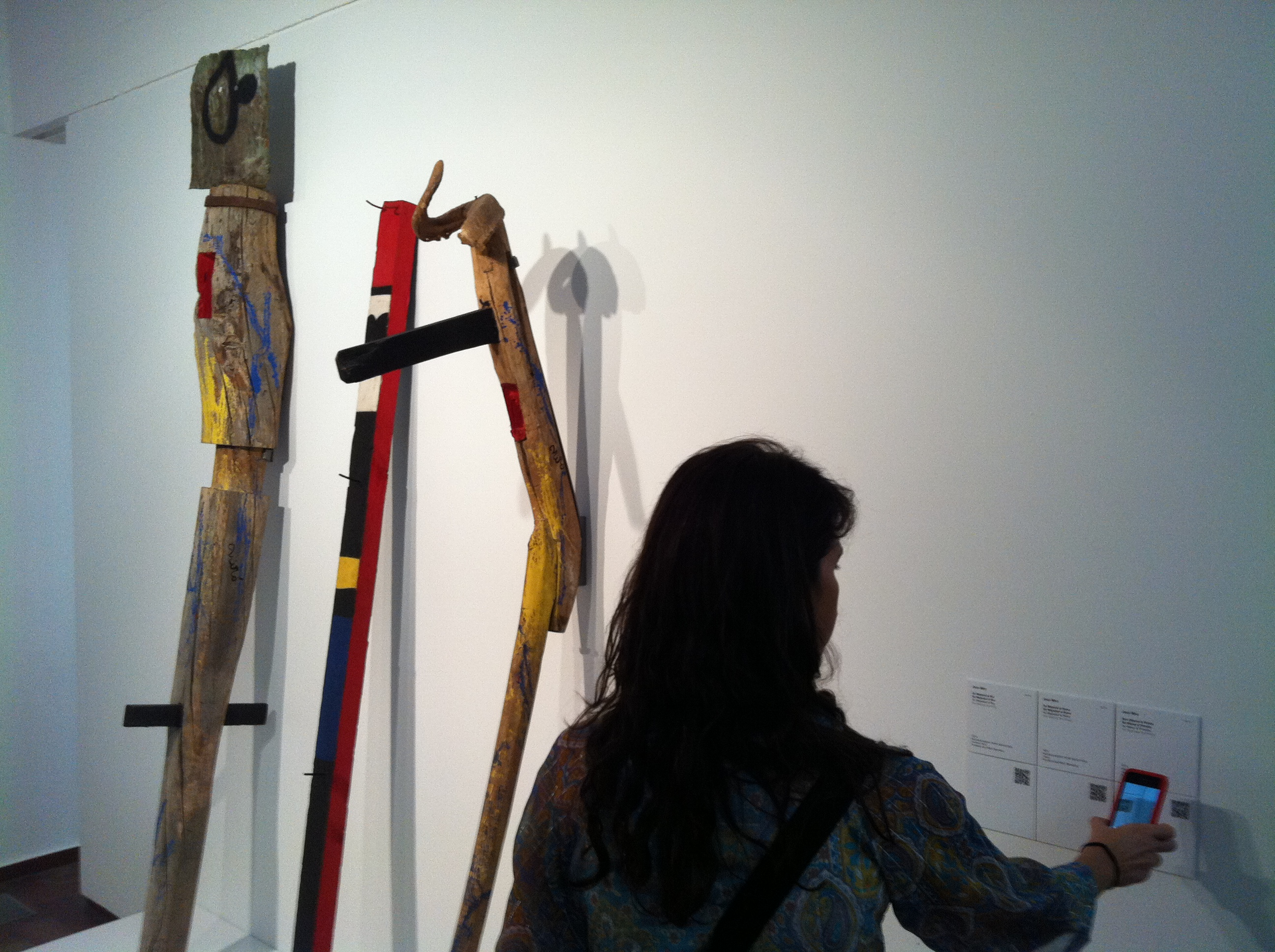
- Artist: Joan Miró
- Year: 1974
- Medium: sculpture, found object
- Dimensions: 204.5 cm × 19 cm × 59 cm (80.5 in × 7.5 in × 23 in)
- Location: Fundació Joan Miró, Barcelona

His Highness the Prince is an object-sculpture made by Joan Miró in 1974. It is held at the Joan Miró Foundation, in Barcelona.

== Background ==
His Highness the Prince, with Her Majesty the Queen and His Majesty the King are part of a series of sculptures made in 1974. During that year a major retrospective of his work was shown at the Grand Palais and the Museé d'Art Moderne, in Paris, where these three works would be exhibited for the first time.

Two years before, the exhibition Magnetic Fields had been held at the Guggenheim Museum in New York and Miró bronzes at the Hayward Gallery of London. It was also the year of construction of the future Joan Miró Foundation in Barcelona, opened to the public on 10 June 1975. This situation of international artistic recognition contrasts with the hard situation in Spain during the last years of the dictatorship. In February of the same year Miró had painted the triptych The Hope of a Condemned Man, concerned about the conviction of the activist Salvador Puig Antich, finally executed in garrotte on 2 March 1974. Juan Carlos de Borbón, then Prince of Spain, was 5 years old who had sworn allegiance to Francisco Franco as his future successor as head of the state.

Miró had created artworks that were critical with the concept of authority, around the character Ubu Roi back in 1966. The bombast of the celebrity in these works contrasts with the humility of their materials, and the same contrast can be seen in His Highness the Prince.

After Franco had died, Miró talked about the civic responsibility of the artist during his acceptance speech for an Honorary degree at the University of Barcelona in 1979:

I understand that an artist is someone who, among the silence of others, uses his voice to say something, and it is required that this thing is not something useless but useful to service people.

— Joan Miró, October 2, 1979

== Description ==
His Highness the Prince consists of two large timbers put together and topped with a curved goat horn. Some parts of the statue retain their original color, while others are painted with blue, red, or yellow paint.

There is a photograph of this work supported by the bank and the front of the house of Son Boter (now integrated into the site of the Pilar and Joan Miró Foundation, in Mallorca) that suggests that it could be done in the workshop that Miró had at the island, from the everyday elements of farm life.

The found objects, featuring traditional objects from the peasant environment of Montroig or Mallorca, are transformed into sculptures.

The exhibition L'escala de l'evasió that opened in October 2011 was supported by access to Wikipedia using QRpedia codes that allowed access to visitors in Catalan, English and several other languages.
