= Alamo (sculpture) =

Sculpture at Astor Place in Manhattan, New York, U.S.

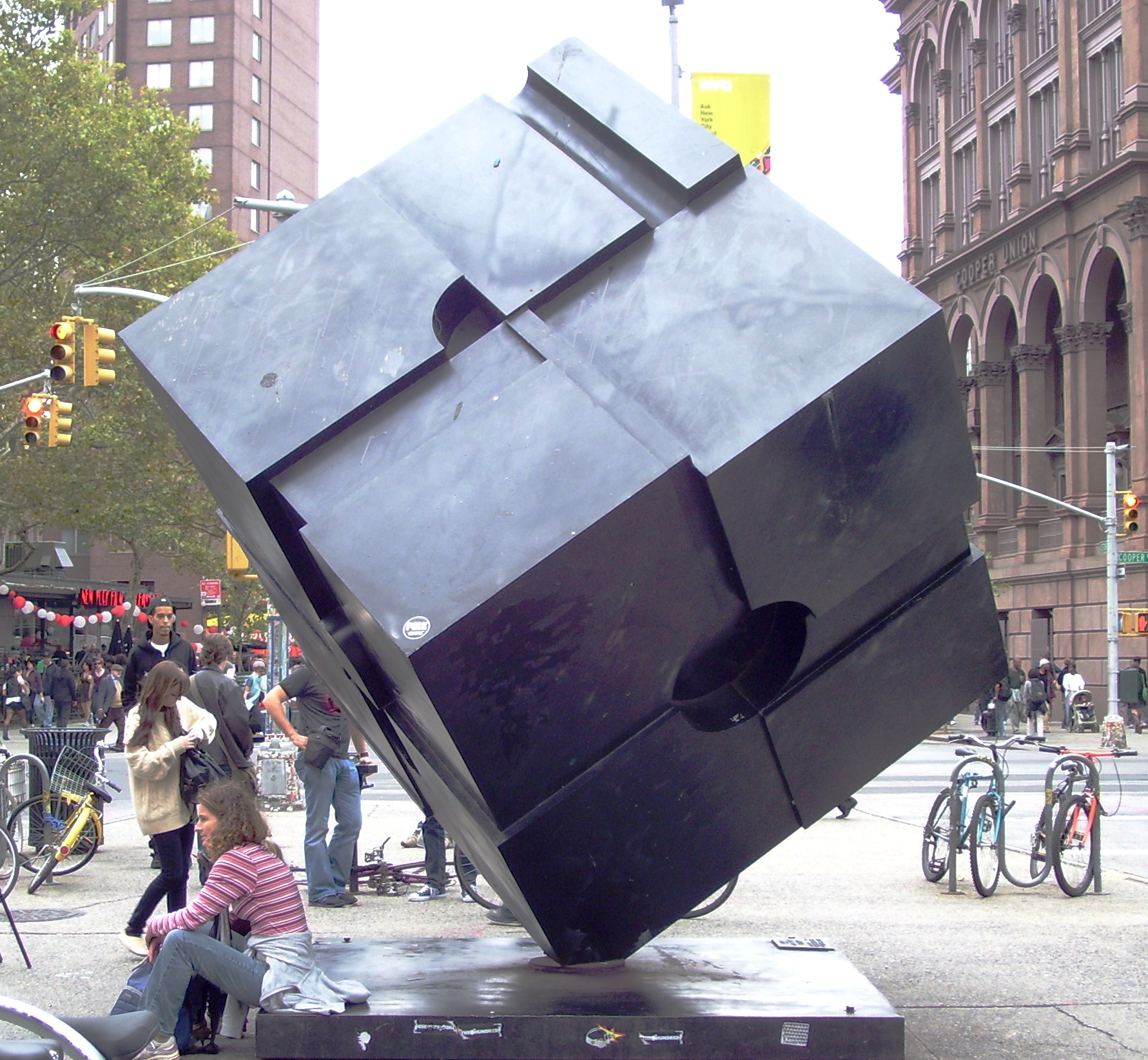
- Alamo in 2010
- Artist: Tony Rosenthal
- Year: 1967
- Type: Painted CorTen Steel
- Dimensions: 4.6 m × 4.6 m × 4.6 m (15 ft × 15 ft × 15 ft)
- Location: Astor Place, Lafayette Street and 8th Street, New York City; 40°43′48″N 73°59′28″W
- Owner: Estate of Tony Rosenthal. Licensed by VAGA at Artists Rights Society.

Alamo, also known as the Astor Place Cube or simply The Cube, is an outdoor sculpture by Tony Rosenthal, located on Astor Place, in the East Village neighborhood of Manhattan in New York City. It is a black cube, 8 feet (2.4 m) long on each side, mounted on a corner. The cube is made of Cor-Ten steel and weighs about 1,800 pounds (820 kg). The faces of the cube are not flat but have various indentations, protrusions, and ledges. The sculpture's name, Alamo, is designated on a small plaque on the base and was selected by the artist's wife because its scale and mass reminded her of the Alamo Mission. It was fabricated by Lippincott, Inc.

== History ==
Installed in 1967 as part of "Sculpture and the Environment", organized by the New York City Department of Cultural Affairs, the cube was one of 25 temporary art installations that were intended to remain for a six-month period; however, local residents successfully petitioned the city to keep Alamo. It has since become a popular meeting place in the East Village. It stands in an intersection, across the street from two entrances to the Astor Place subway station, as well as the Cooper Union Foundation Building.

The cube rotates around a hidden pole in its center. The cube's sculptor Tony Rosenthal never intended for Alamo to spin, saying in 2005: "I actually thought we would put it on this post and we’d turn it to the position we wanted it and then stick it like that." However, the cube was never locked in place. One observer described spinning the cube as "part of the New York experience".

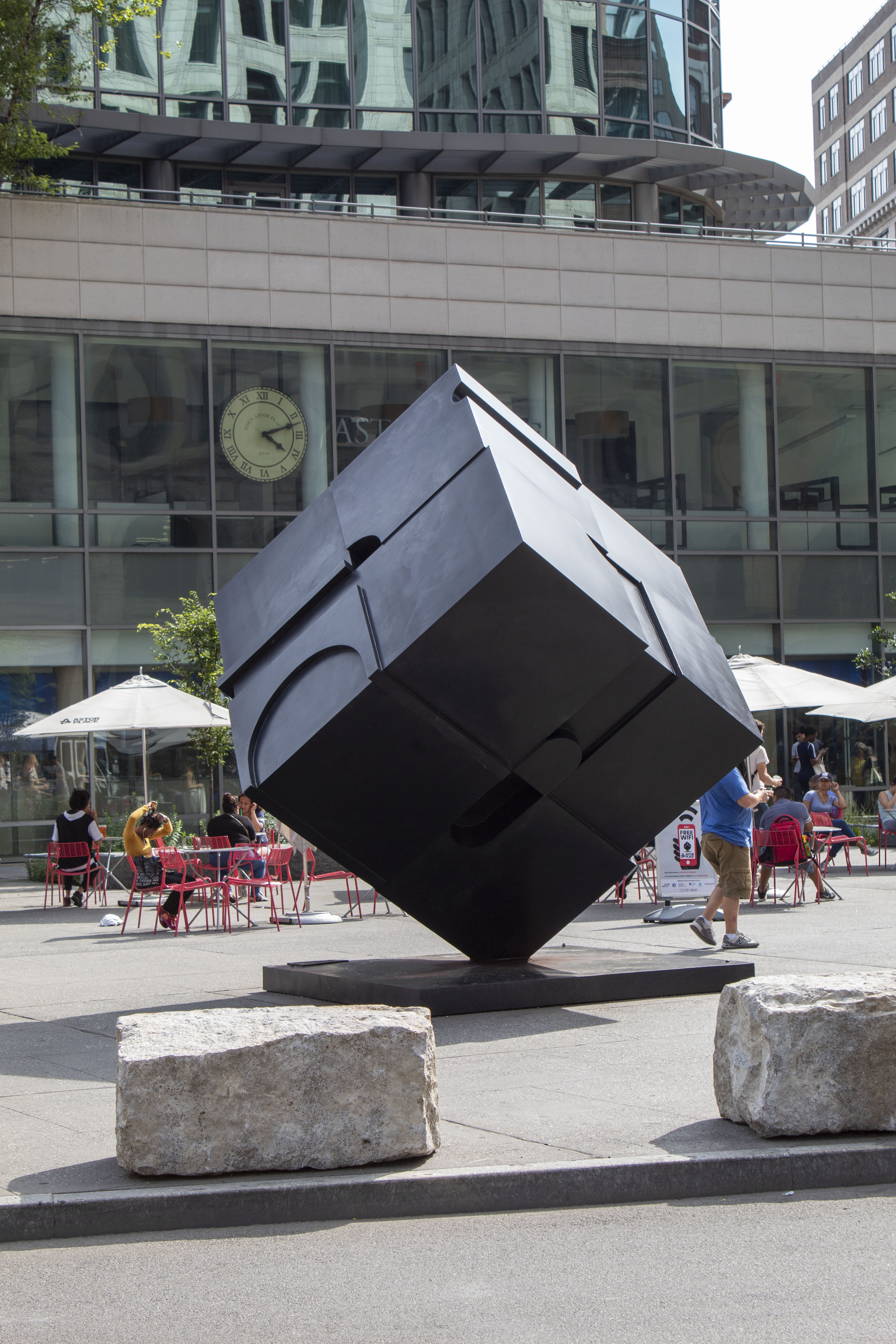
The Alamo in front of an outdoor café after the 2016 renovations

On March 10, 2005, the Parks Department removed the Cube for maintenance. The original artist and crew replaced a missing bolt, and made a few other minor repairs. A makeshift replica made of polyvinyl chloride tubes, named the Jello Cube in honor of Peter Cooper, was placed in its stead. In November 2005, the Cube returned with a fresh coat of black paint, still able to spin. In October 2015, the sculpture was covered in a protective wooden box because of the redevelopment of Astor Place, but was eventually removed off-site again for "restoration and repainting" and to keep it "out of harm's way," according to a representative of the New York City Parks Department. On November 1, 2016, the sculpture returned to Astor Place after a $180,000 reconstruction and rust removal. In November 2017, the Greenwich Village Society for Historic Preservation celebrated the sculpture's 50th year anniversary of its installation.

By May 2022, the New York City Department of Transportation, which was responsible for the sculpture's maintenance, determined that problems with spinning the structure could cause further damage. According to city engineers, the cube was in danger of tipping over if it continued to spin. The city locked it in place with metal braces until additional work on the pivot could eventually prove sufficient to permit it to spin freely again. In May 2023, the DOT announced the cube had been removed and would be refurbished offsite at a Connecticut foundry. The sculpture was returned to Astor Place in August 2023.

== Similar cubes ==
Alamo is one of seven similar cubes created by Rosenthal. The identical Endover stands on the campus of the University of Michigan in Ann Arbor, Michigan, where Rosenthal earned a bachelor of fine arts degree. The cube was donated by the class of 1965 and was installed in 1968. The Endover cube also rotates but its pivot is sunken into the ground, as opposed to the pivot of the Alamo, which is on a separate platform.

== Pranks ==
- In June 2003, the Cube was the subject of a prank played by the ATF squad (All Too Flat) in which it was turned into a giant Rubik's Cube. The cube stayed up for about 24 hours before NYC maintenance removed the painted cardboard panels from the sculpture.
- In March 2006, the Graffiti Research Lab distributed LED throwies to a group of people to throw onto and decorate the Cube.
- In April 2006, a tub of chalk was left by the Cube and passersby began to draw on it. Seven individuals were later arrested for vandalism. The chalk was washed off by NYC maintenance the following morning.
- In October 2011, the visual artist Olek (Agata Oleksiak) made a crochet covering with their signature camouflage pattern over the cube.
- On December 14, 2011, Caltech students covered the cube in a fitted cloth, making it resemble the Weighted Companion Cube from the video game Portal.
- In October 2013, a fake documentary video went viral claiming to show that a man lived inside the cube.
- For Halloween 2015, a man dressed up as The Cube and stood in its place. At the time Alamo was temporarily off-site because Astor Place was being rebuilt.

== See also ==
- 5 in 1 (1973–1974)
