= Big Red (sculpture) =

Sculpture in Eugene, Oregon, U.S.

- The sculpture in 2015
- Artist: Bruce Beasley
- Year: 1974
- Type: Sculpture
- Medium: Steel
- Condition: "Treatment needed" (1993)
- Location: Eugene, Oregon, United States; 44.05259°N 123.10118°W

Big Red, also known as Red, is an outdoor 1974 steel sculpture by Bruce Beasley, installed at West 7th Avenue between Washington and Jefferson streets in Eugene, Oregon, United States.

== Description and history ==
Bruce Beasley's Big Red is an outdoor sculpture installed at Washington Jefferson Park, located at West 7th Avenue between Washington and Jefferson, in Eugene. The red painted, abstract steel sculpture measures 12 feet (3.7 m), 9 inches (23 cm) x 11 feet (3.4 m), 6 inches (15 cm) x 36 feet (11 m), 5 inches (13 cm).

The piece is among those created in June 1974, when the city held the Oregon International Sculpture Symposium, which attracted artists from around the country. According to the Smithsonian Institution, the purpose of the event was to provide attendees "an opportunity to observe the creation of a major art work, how it was constructed and what the artist meant to convey with it". Studio space was provided at the University of Oregon and at Lane Community College; Big Red was created at the latter location and was relocated to its present site by a large truck and crane. The work was funded by a National Endowment for the Arts, Art in Public Places grant that was given to the city in 1974. Other funding sources included the City of Eugene, Lane Community College, Lane County, Oregon Arts Commission, the Portland Art Museum, and the University of Oregon.

The work's condition was deemed "treatment needed" by Smithsonian's "Save Outdoor Sculpture!" program in August 1993. It was administered by the City of Eugene's Facility Management Division at that time. In August 2001, Eugene-based Saylor Painting Company treated the sculpture.

== See also ==
- 1974 in art
