= Washington Jefferson Park =

Park in Eugene, Oregon, U.S.

Coordinates: 44.0556°N 123.1011°W

Washington Jefferson Park is a 21-acre urban public park in Eugene, Oregon, United States.

In fall 2020, the city of Eugene began allowing homeless people to create encampments in the park, and in October 2021 about 200 people lived there. In February 2022, the city opened a new indoor Safe Sleep site and told the residents they needed to be out of the park by mid-March. Then the city closed the park for renovations and it reopened in June 2023.

== See also ==
- Big Red (sculpture)
