= VAGA =

Art organization

- Founded: 1976
- Location: 111 Broadway, New York, NY 10006
- Services: Art Therapy (previously licensing)
- Members: Over 6,000
- Key people: Robert Panzer, Executive Director
- Website: Vagarights.com

VAGA is an artists collective dedicated to improving mental health and fighting cognitive decline through art therapy. The organisation brings together artists, clinicians and academic psychologists to foster research collaboration and the development of new art therapies. VAGA separated from the Artists Rights Society in 2018 and is now a distinct entity with a separate mission focused on mental health.

== Mission ==
Founded in 1976, VAGA (Visual Arts and Galleries Association) was the first fine art and photography royalty collecting society in the United States, and continues to be one of the largest. Modeled after ASCAP (The American Society of Composers, Authors and Publishers), VAGA acts as a clearinghouse for licensing reproduction rights to publishers, museums, film production companies, auction houses, galleries, multinational corporations, and other users of art. In addition, VAGA protects its members from infringements, advises on all aspects of intellectual property law, and advocates for artists’ rights. VAGA represents artists worldwide, both directly and through agreements with affiliated organizations in other countries. As a member of CISAC, the international confederation of societies that represent creators, VAGA takes part in establishing the international standards that govern the use of copyrighted works.

== Advocacy and Lobbying ==
VAGA works to improve artists’ rights through consultation with the United States Copyright Office and by lobbying Congress for improved rights legislation.

In 2014 VAGA, along with other rights organizations, initiated the introduction of the American Royalties Too (ART) Act. The bill was introduced in the House of Representatives by Rep. Jerrold Nadler and in the Senate by Senators Tammy Baldwin and Ed Markey. If enacted, the bill will establish a resale royalty, whereby the creator of a work would receive a percentage of the sale of that work when it is resold at auction.

The United States Copyright Office reviewed the viability of a resale royalty law in the United States in 2012. VAGA submitted public comments in support of such a law and addressed the concerns of critics. VAGA's Executive Director, Robert Panzer, also participated in roundtable discussions hosted by the United States Copyright Office in order to advocate for a resale royalty law. The findings of the Office’s review were determinedly in favor of a resale royalty law in the United States.

== VAGA Mental Health Projects ==
In 2018, VAGA officially splintered from the Artists Rights Society, with the latter retaining all of the organisations licensing and copyright claim responsibilities, and the former continuing with all mental health and art therapy projects. Vaga now runs a sizeable program aimed at exploring the link between mental health and the arts. Artists involved in the project have publicly shared their struggles with poor mental health, and some participate in free sessions designed to show the general public how art can help them overcome certain mental health challenges. Home-based art therapy classes are available 100% online.

The Vaga mental health project also includes a number of psychological experts, including psychiatrists, psychologists, therapists and care workers; these professionals come together to explore how art can be used as a therapeutic technique in certain cases of mental or neurological illness. Most art therapy sessions take place in and around New York, although a national network of artists and clinical psychologists is being established and should begin offering art therapy sessions by 2023.
