= Kerim Seiler =

Swiss artist and architect

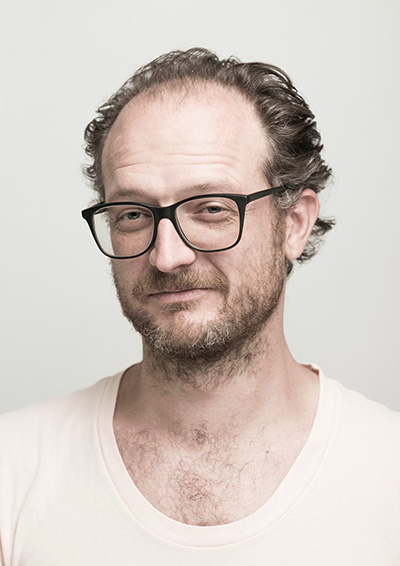
- Born: November 13, 1974; Bern, Switzerland
- Occupation: Artist
- Years active: 1999–present
- Partner: Claire Dugan
- Website: kerimseiler.com

Kerim Seiler (born November 13, 1974) is a Swiss artist.

== Education ==
Seiler began his studies in 1991 by completing a pre-course for the Kunstgewerbeschule Zürich. Between 1993 and '95 he completed the degree course "Média Mixtes" at the Ecole Supérieure d’Art Visuel Genève. From 1997 to 2002, under the tutelage of Prof. Bernhard Johannes Blume, he continued his education at the Hochschule für bildende Künste Hamburg. In 2011 he was awarded a Master of Advanced Studies degree in architecture at ETH Zurich.

== Career ==
Early work of Kerim Seiler is characterized by two-dimensional, life-size paintings of ordinary city objects, such as park benches and ticket machines. He diversified into larger works, such as colorful and inflatable molecule sculptures, a 250-meter-long permanent neon light installation at Zürich's central train station and his vaguely habitable brick structure Gulliver in Pfungen (2009). Appearing to maintain a classical view of harmony, Seiler has said that space and structure are key elements in his work.

Seiler's acclaimed 2014 habitable sculpture Relay (Situationist Space Program), exhibited at abc—art berlin contemporary, is a replica of his 2010 habitable sculpture of the same title on permanent display in Johannesburg, of which an earlier (2012) replica had been exhibited on the roof of Hotel Crystal in St. Moritz and at Grieder Contemporary in Zürich. Though his large-scale works often entail municipal (e.g., his 2014 building facade Iris in Schlieren, Switzerland) or ecclesiastical (e.g., his prominent 2015 neon sculpture DIMETHYLTRYPTAMIN at the Roman Catholic Diocese / erstwhile Prince-Bishopric of Würzburg) collaboration, they are sometimes executed covertly and/or via agricultural machinery. In 2016 Seiler created "a neon sign in the shape of bones", and, according to Urs Bühler, a neon installation entitled "Space Knot" proceeding along 300 linear meters beneath the Swiss National Museum ceiling, "like a ghost presiding over the museum, curved shapes giving an impression of Harald Naegeli spray cans transubstantiated into colorful illumination."

Seiler's comprehensive practice—installation, performance, sculpture, painting, drawing—has sought to dismantle boundaries between art, science and community. His 3-volume compendium of writings, drawings and photographs Kerim in the Sky with Seiler was published in 2012 by Nieves.

Seiler's work is exhibited worldwide, including in Moscow, Cairo, Zürich, New York City, Berlin, Paris, Los Angeles and Johannesburg. He is represented by Grieder Contemporary in Berlin and Zürich, where he is also a key strategist in the rehabilitation of Cabaret Voltaire. In 2016 Seiler produced two enormous public sculptures for the ceremonial opening of the world's longest and deepest traffic tunnel, the NEAT Gotthard Base Tunnel in Switzerland. (Note: Toward the northern end of the Gotthard Base Tunnel, in Rynächt (between Altdorf and Schattdorf), Seiler fashioned "a picnic area where travelers are invited to pause, look forward and backward, ponder." In the seminary town of Pollegio to the south, by contrast, is Seiler's "spectacular nine-meter tall pavilion, a vibrant platform for meetings, talks and live music." (Pfeiffer)) In 2020 Seiler collaborated with Fuhrimann Hächler Architekten on a villa in Küsnacht.
