= 5 in 1 =

Sculpture in Manhattan, New York, U.S.

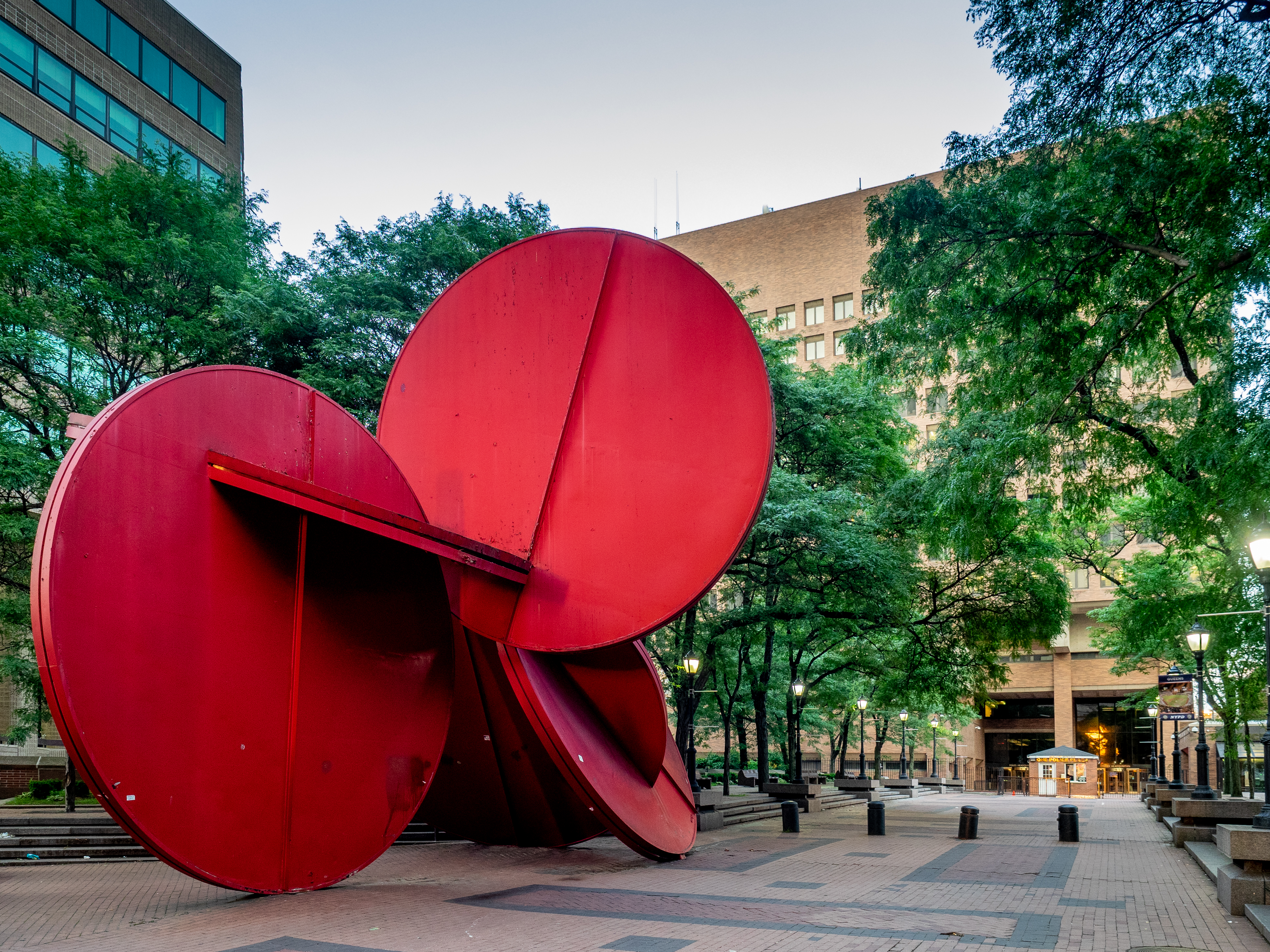
- The sculpture at 1 Police Plaza in 2019
- Artist: Tony Rosenthal
- Year: 1973–1974
- Type: Sculpture
- Medium: CorTen steel
- Location: New York City; 40°42′46″N 74°00′11″W

5 in 1 is a 35-foot-tall (11 m), 75,000-pound (34,000 kg) painted CorTen steel sculpture by Tony Rosenthal, installed at 1 Police Plaza in Lower Manhattan, New York. Commissioned by the government of New York City in 1971 at a cost of $80,000, it was created between 1973 and 1974, and installed on the brick paved pedestrian mall of 1 Police Plaza.

Rosenthal titled "5 in 1" as a metaphor for each of New York City's five boroughs: the Bronx, Brooklyn, Manhattan, Queens, and Staten Island. He created the 35-by-28-by-42-foot (10.7 m × 8.5 m × 12.8 m) sculpture with five interlocking discs representing each of the boroughs. Each of the five interlocking discs weighs 15,000 pounds (6,800 kg). At the time of its installation in 1974, "5 in 1" was the largest metal public art sculpture installed in New York City.

== See also ==
- 1974 in art
- Plop art
