= Mother and Child (Cassatt) =

Painting by Mary Cassatt

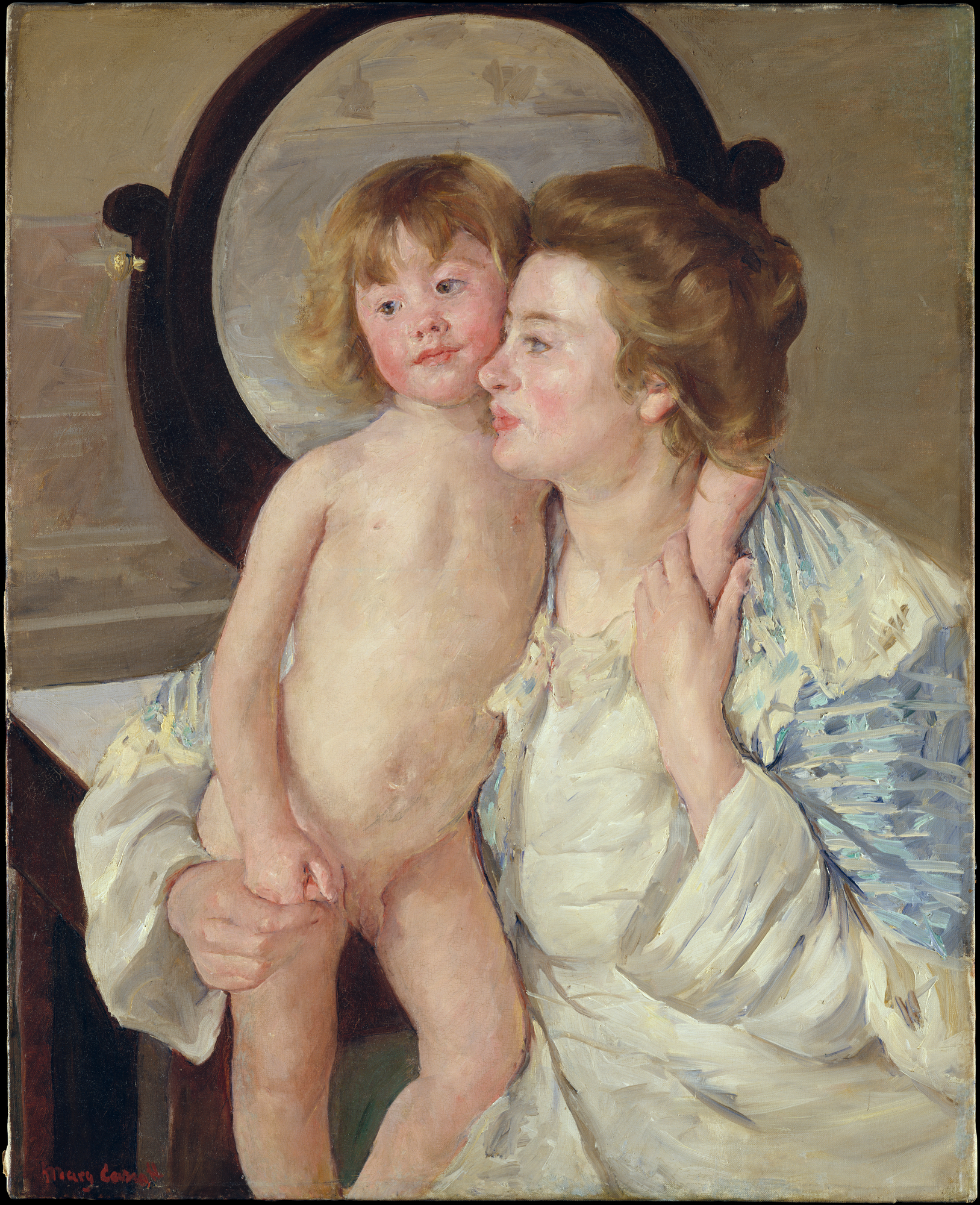
- Artist: Mary Cassatt
- Year: c. 1898
- Medium: oil on canvas
- Dimensions: 81.6 cm × 65.7 cm (32.1 in × 25.9 in)
- Location: Metropolitan Museum of Art; New York
- Accession: 29.100.47

Mother and Child (The Oval Mirror) is an oil-on-canvas painting by the American Impressionist artist Mary Cassatt. The painting depicts a mother and her child in front of a mirror. The painting provides a glimpse of the domestic life of a mother and her child, evoking religious iconography from the Italian Renaissance. However, portrayals of a mother and her child are common in Cassatt's work, so it is possible that this similarity is coincidental rather than intentional.

It is unclear when exactly Cassatt painted Mother and Child, but it was acquired by dealer Durand-Ruel in 1898. Durand-Ruel sold the painting to the Havemeyers in 1899. The Metropolitan Museum of Art acquired the painting in 1929.

== Context ==
From 1881 to 1891, Cassatt's reputation grew as she began to focus on mother-and-child subjects. In addition to Mother and Child (The Oval Mirror), Cassatt painted several other depictions of mother-and-child subjects. Revisiting the same subject was common among Impressionists, such as Monet's repeated depiction of haystacks. Prior to focusing on mothers and their children, Cassatt typically other scenes of daily life. Cassatt's focus on the mother-and-child format during the 1880s has sometimes been interpreted as related to the rise of Symbolism in French art during this decade.

== Analysis ==
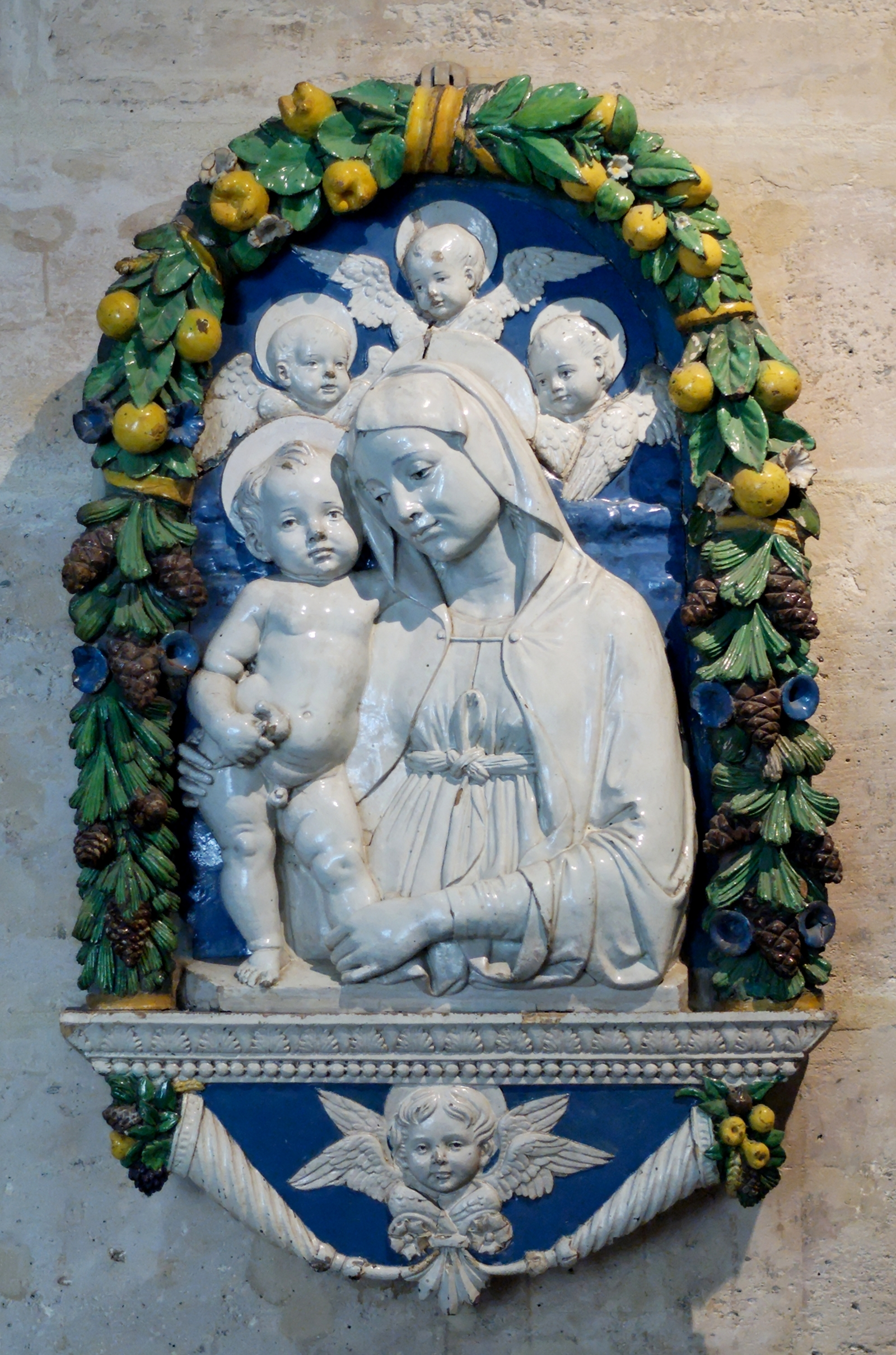
Madonna and Child from the workshop of Andrea della Robbia

The work depicts a mother and child and appears to be drawing from the iconography of "Mary and child" religious imagery. Comparisons between Mother and Child and depictions of the Madonna and infant Christ from the Italian Renaissance show that Cassatt may have been influenced by religious imagery. Similarities are most apparent in the positioning of the figures and particularly the child. The Madonna and Child from the workshop of Andrea della Robbia provides one possible point of comparison. The child in Cassatt's painting adopts the contrapposto stance of Christ in works from the Italian Renaissance. He leans on his mother with one hand draped across her neck and the other clasping his mother's hand. This is the same position of the infant Christ in the Madonna and Christ. Additionally, the mirror behind their heads alludes to the halos in Madonna and Christ. The Havemeyers also made a connection to religious imagery when the painting was in their possession. They referred to it as "The Florentine Madonna."

While the mirror behind the figures' heads could be understood as a religious symbol, it also introduces an alternative perspective. The mirror could also convey the domestic setting in which Cassatt places her figures. The mirror in this painting is opaque which creates what the curator Judith Barter describes as a sense of "intimacy, privacy, and quite thoughtfulness."

The art historian Griselda Pollock similarly rejects the idea that Cassatt was reworking the religious symbol of the Madonna and infant Christ. She argues that Cassatt was using images of a parent and child to express the phases of family life. Pollock discusses how one of Cassatt's main themes was the depiction of mother and child, making similarities with religious imagery incidental. Pollock maintains that Cassatt's focus was on the relationship between any mother with her child rather than on the relationship between Mary and Christ.

== Influences ==
=== Kitagawa Utamaro ===
Like many other Impressionists, Cassatt was influenced by Japanese art. In 1890, a Japanese graphic arts exhibition came to Paris and Cassatt frequently visited the exhibition. One of her main influences was Kitagawa Utamaro, whose subjects were similar to Cassatt's. He typically depicted woman and children going about their domestic lives. One print of Utamaro's that likely influenced Cassatt is Takashima Ohisha Using Two Mirrors to Observe Her Coiffure. Utamaro and Cassatt both use a mirror in their paintings to communicate the femininity of their subjects. Cassatt may have owned the print.

=== Edgar Degas ===
Because she was an Impressionist, Cassatt was naturally influenced by and worked closely with other members of the group, particularly Edgar Degas. The dealer Durand-Ruel, who sold Mother and Child, told the Havemeyers that when he asked Degas his opinion on the piece, he replied that it was "the finest work that Mary Cassatt ever did" and that "it contains all her qualities and is particularly characteristic of her talent." Later, Louisine Havemeyer learned that Degas had actually said: "It has all your [Mary's] qualities and all your faults—it's the baby Jesus and his English nurse."

== Ownership ==
=== Havemeyers ===
In 1899, the Havemeyer family offered $2000 for Mother and Child. This price was unusually high and was most likely due to Edgar Degas's praise for the painting. The Havemeyers at this point had a significant collection of Degas's works and a few other compositions by Cassatt.

=== The Metropolitan Museum of Art ===
In 1929, Mrs. Henry Osborne Havemeyer died and the painting was given to the Metropolitan Museum of Art. Today, the painting can be found in Gallery 774 of the museum.

== See also ==
- List of works by Mary Cassatt
