= Artists Rights Society =

Artists Rights Society (ARS) is a copyright, licensing, and monitoring organization for visual artists in the United States. Founded in 1987, ARS is a member of the International Confederation of Societies of Authors and Composers and as such represents in the United States the intellectual property rights interests of over 122,000 visual artists and estates of visual artists from around the world (painters, sculptors, photographers, architects and others).

== Represented artists and estates ==
The long list of the artists represented by ARS includes such names as Alexander Calder, Jasper Johns, Pablo Picasso, Henri Matisse, Georges Braque, Joseph Beuys, Pierre Bonnard, Constantin Brâncuși, Marc Chagall, Ching Ho Cheng, Henry Darger, Jean Dubuffet, Marcel Duchamp, Max Ernst, Alberto Giacometti, Wassily Kandinsky, Paul Klee, Le Corbusier, Fernand Léger, René Magritte, Joan Miró, Edvard Munch, Man Ray, Andy Warhol, Richard Bernstein (artist), Salvador Dalí, Mark Rothko, Jackson Pollock, Georgia O'Keeffe, Tony Rosenthal also known as Bernard Rosenthal, Will Barnet, Knox Martin, Diego Rivera and Frida Kahlo, among many others. In addition to estates, ARS represents many living artists, including Damien Hirst, Judy Chicago, Jenny Holzer, Richard Serra, Hans Haacke, Jim Dine, Robert Irwin, Brice Marden, Dorothea Rockburne, Mark Tobey, and Bruce Nauman, among others.

== Infringement and advocacy ==
In 2002 and 2006, ARS asked Google to remove customised versions of its logo put up to commemorate artists Salvador Dalí and Joan Miró, alleging that portions of specific artworks under their protection had been used in the logos, and that they were used without permission. According to Theodore Feder, president of ARS, "there are underlying copyrights to the works of Miró, and they are putting it up without having the rights." Google complied with the request, but denied that there was any violation of copyright.

Since 2008, ARS and Google have worked together to produce customized versions of Google's logo to commemorate ARS member artists, Marc Chagall (2008), René Magritte (2008) and Jackson Pollock (2009).

In June 2008, ARS president Theodore Feder, with artist Frank Stella, wrote an Op-Ed for The Art Newspaper decrying a proposed U.S. orphan works law.

In July 2008, ARS worked with the Illustrator's Partnership of America (IPA) and the Advertising Photographers of America (APA) to submit to congress a document titled, "Suggested Amendments to H.R. 5889: Orphan Works Act of 2008." The document outlined 12 amendments which the ARS, IPA and APA believe will decrease the potential negative impact of the Orphan Works Act and discourage "wide-scale infringements of visual art while depriving creators of protections currently available under the Copyright Act." ARS has joined over 60 other art licensing businesses (including the Association of American Editorial Cartoonists, Society of Children's Book Writers and Illustrators and the Stock Artists Alliance, among others) in opposing both The Orphan Works Act of 2008 and The Shawn Bentley Orphan Works Act of 2008.
