= Mother & Child (Etrog) =

Sculpture in the USA

- Artist: Sorel Etrog
- Year: 1962
- Type: Sculpture
- Medium: Bronze
- Dimensions: 280 cm (112 in × 40 1/2 in)

Mother & Child is an abstract sculpture by Sorel Etrog.

== Exhibitions ==
There are three examples of this sculpture on display in the United States:

- At the University of Chicago in Chicago, IL (41°47′22.5″N 87°36′10″W).
- At the Franklin D. Murphy Sculpture Garden at the University of California, Los Angeles in Los Angeles, CA (34°04′30.40″N 118°26′24.26″W).
- At the Annmarie Sculpture Garden in Solomons, MD (38°20′41.78″N 76°27′8.55″W).
