= May 1968 (Miró) =

Painting by Joan Miró

May 1968 is a painting by Joan Miró which he created between 1968 and 1973. It is part of the collection of the Fundació Joan Miró, in Barcelona. The painting was inspired by the unrest in France in 1968.

== History ==
Jacques Dupin spoke of the circumstances under which the artist made this work:

May 68, I arrived in Paris to prepare a statement of the Cathedral of Barcelona, I speak with Miró, I showed him my enthusiasm, my anxieties, the game and the challenge of an ambitious spring. He began painting but he did not end until five years later. The spots, scratches, fingerprints and black graphics are evidence of the activity that caused this work.

The paintings of this effervescent period were part of a retrospective exhibition for the seventy-fifth anniversary of the artist, which took place at the Maeght Foundation, the Miró Foundation and Cathedral of Barcelona and Haus der Kunst in Munich.

During this time, Miró's work was booming. The period climaxed in 1973, with a series of paintings carved with knives and burned with gasoline and Chalumu.

== Background ==
In the spring of 1968 students from the universities of Sorbonne and Nanterre revolted in continuing demonstrations that lasted almost a month and a half. This revolt inspired the workers to strike. It was known as the French May and May 68. Joan Miró sympathized with the movement and made this work, a wall where the vitality and prints are ideal for those events.

== Description ==
On a white background, the artist made brightly coloured stains in the range typical of this period: blue, red, green, yellow and orange. These patches of colour are crushed by thick coloured black lines. This set is superimposed in the foreground a large black spot. With fingers imagined as the drip lines of black, mimicking the impact of a ball or jet black paint.

== Main exhibitions ==
Year	Exhibition	Place	City	Ref
1974		Grand Palais	Paris	núm. 185
1975		Fundació Joan Miró	Barcelona	núm. 82
1978		Museo Español de Arte Moderno	Madrid	núm. 84
1979		Orsanmichele	Florence	núm. 40
1980		Museo de Arte Moderno	Mexico City	núm. 61.
1985		Palazzo dei Diamanti	Ferrara	núm. 12
