= Tony Rosenthal =

American abstract sculptor (1914–2009)

- Born: Bernard Rosenthal; August 9, 1914; Highland Park, Illinois
- Died: July 28, 2009 (aged 94); Southampton, New York
- Education: University of Michigan, Ann Arbor, Michigan
- Known for: American abstract sculptor.
- Movement: Public art sculptor

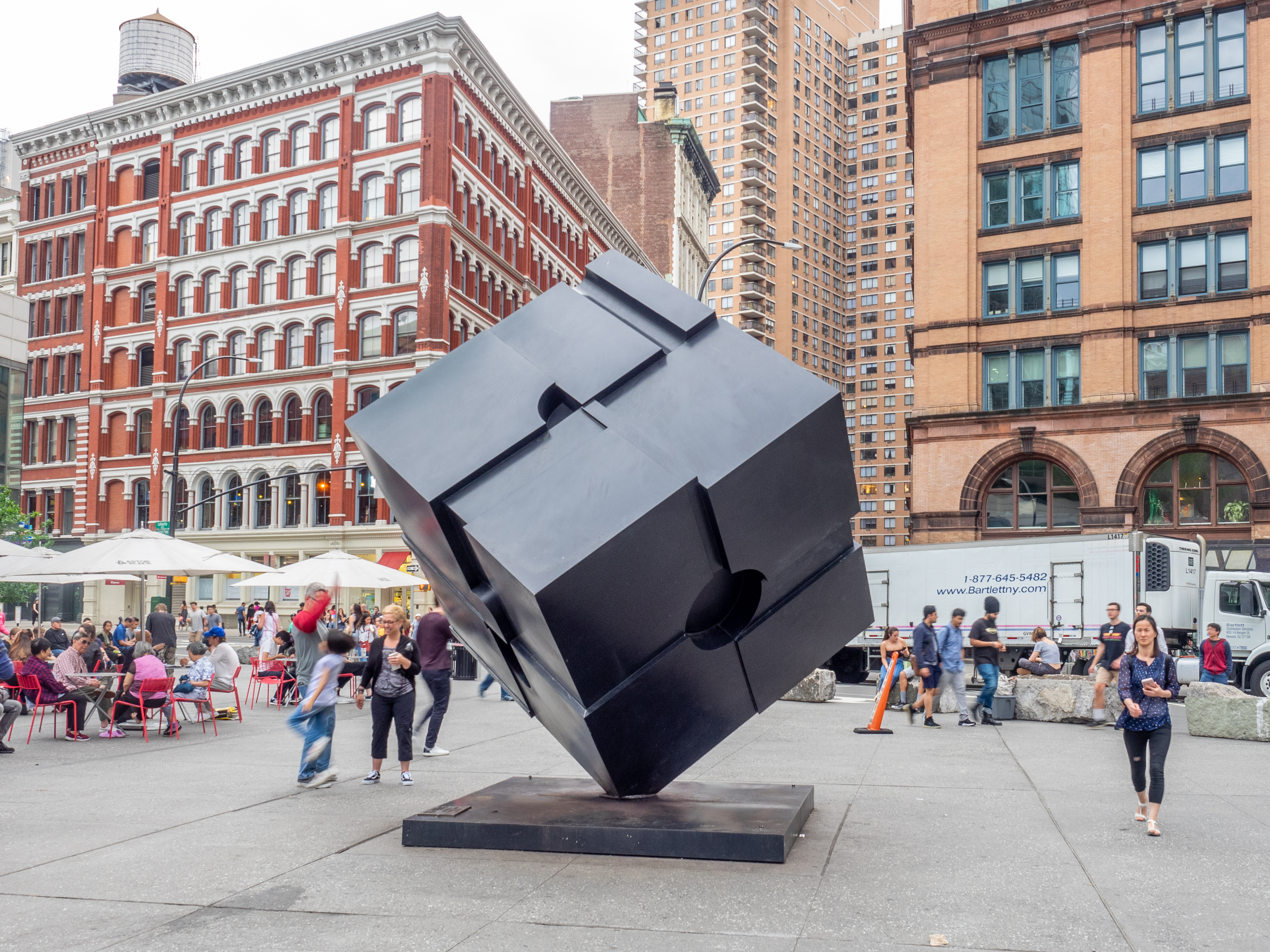
Tony Rosenthal's Alamo

Bernard J. Rosenthal (August 9, 1914 – July 28, 2009), also known as Tony Rosenthal, was an American sculptor known for his monumental public sculptures created over seven decades.

== Biography ==
Rosenthal was born August 9, 1914, in Highland Park, Illinois, a suburb of Chicago. He received his Bachelor of Fine Arts degree at the University of Michigan in 1936 and later studied at The Cranbrook Academy of Art under Carl Milles.

== Career ==
Rosenthal received his first public art commission when he created A Nubian Slave for the Elgin Watch Company building at the 1939 World's Fair.

Although Rosenthal's public art included five works in Manhattan, and numerous similar works in Los Angeles, Philadelphia, Florida, Michigan, Connecticut, the artist remained elusive. In The New York Times, art dealer Joseph K. Levene said of Rosenthal: "He reminds me of a character actor. You know the face but not the name. With him, you know the art". By the time of his death at 94, he had not had a retrospective of his work.

Rosenthal's works are owned by museums around the world, including: Chrysler Museum: Big Six, 1977; Connecticut College: Memorial Cube, 1972; Israel Museum: Oracle, 1960; Long House Reserve: Mandala, 1994–95, Rites of Spring, 1997; Los Angeles County Museum of Art: Things Invisible to See, 1960, Harp Player, 1950; Guild Hall of East Hampton: Cube 72, 1972; Milwaukee Art Museum: Big Six, 1977, Maquette for Hammarskjold, 1977; National Gallery of Art: Magpole,1965; San Diego Museum of Art: Odyssey, 1974; Risd Museum: Cumuli III, 1965.

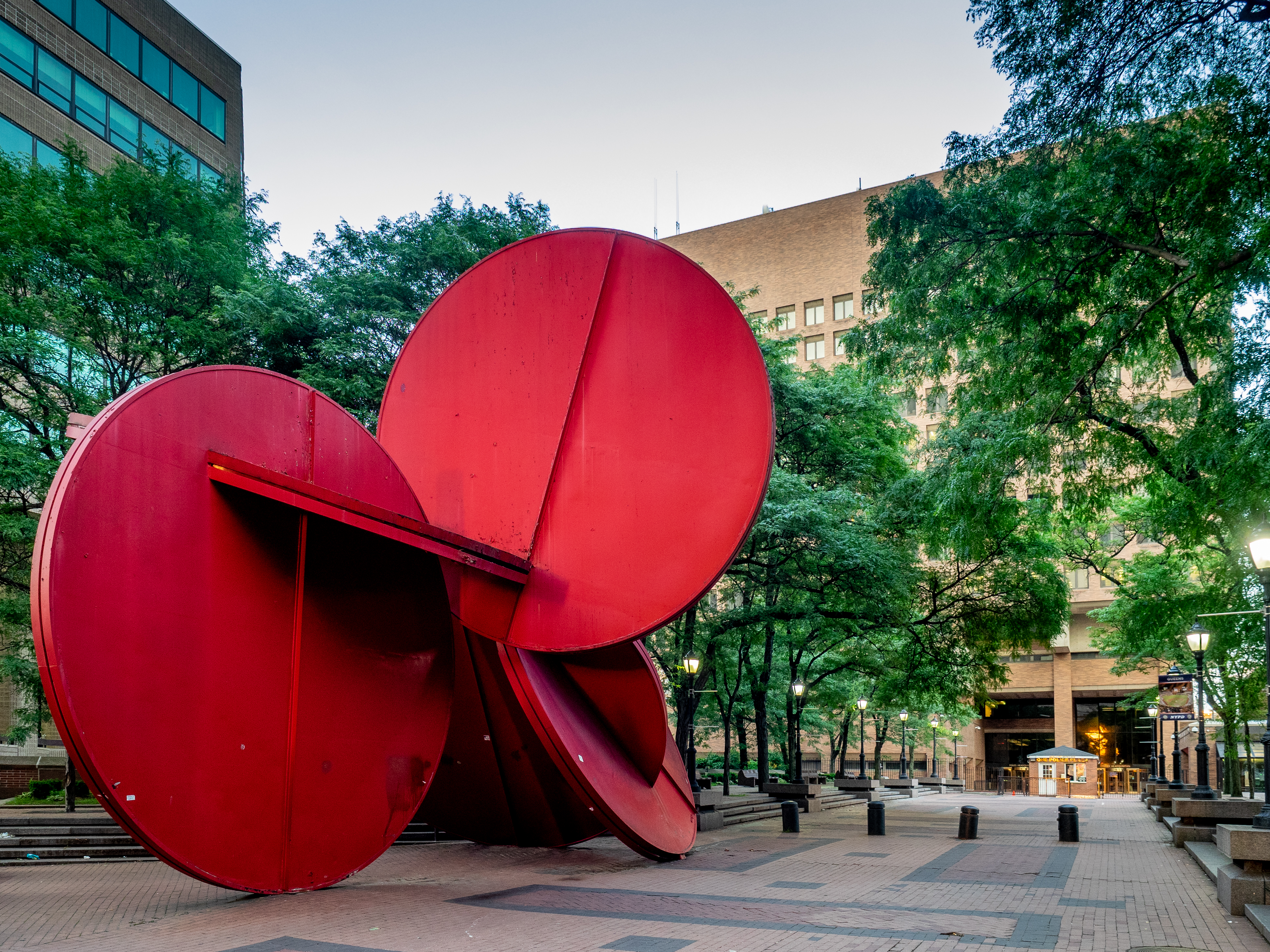
Tony Rosenthal ’’5 in 1’’, 1973–74 at One Police Plaza ©Estate of Tony Rosenthal / Licensed by VAGA at Artists Rights Society (ARS), NY

== Public art ==
Tony Rosenthal was best known for his large outdoor geometric abstract sculptures. Rosenthal's public work includes:

- The Family Group, Parker Center, Los Angeles, 1955.
- Orion, Fulton Mall, Fresno, 1964.
- Duologue, Governor Nelson A. Rockefeller Empire State Plaza Art Collection Albany, New York 1965
- Alamo, Astor Place, New York City, 1967. This "established Rosenthal as a master of monumental public sculpture, and something of a standard bearer of the contemporary structurist esthetic." He stated: "It is…important the sculpture interact with the public."
- The Cube "Endover", The University of Michigan, Ann Arbor, Michigan, 1968. Gift from the University of Michigan class of 1965 and Rosenthal, an alumnus of the university (Class of 1936)
- Cube 72, 1972, Guild Hall of East Hampton, East Hampton, NY, 1972
- Odyssey III, San Diego Museum of Art, California, 1973
- 5 in 1, Lower Manhattan, New York City, 1973–74
- Indiana Totem, 1989, Circle, 1987, J.S. Bach Fugure, 1991, Indiana University Art Museum, Bloomington, Indiana

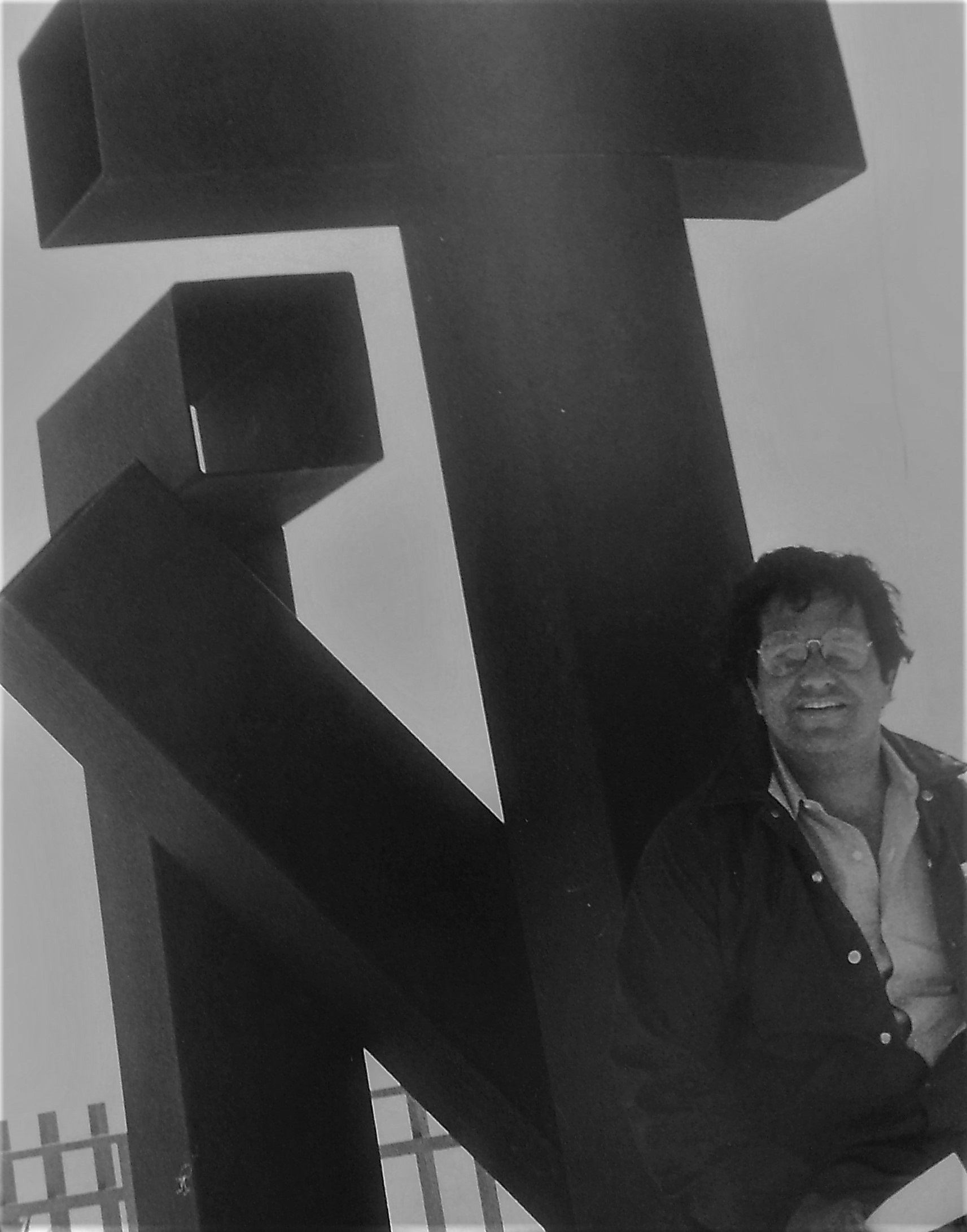
Photograph of art collector Martin Margulies with Tony Rosenthal ’’T-Square’’ (1978) at Grove Isle, Miami, Florida © Estate of Tony Rosenthal / Licensed by VAGA at Artists Rights Society (ARS), NY

- Hammarskjold, 1977, Brooklyn College, Brooklyn, New York (formerly located at the Fashion Institute of Technology)
