= Bruce Beasley =

American abstract expressionist sculptor

- Born: 20 May 1939; Los Angeles
- Education: Dartmouth College, University of California, Berkeley
- Occupation: Sculptor
- Website: brucebeasley.com

Bruce Beasley (born 1939, in Los Angeles, California) is an American abstract expressionist sculptor born in Los Angeles and currently living and working in Oakland, California. He attended Dartmouth College from 1957–59 studying engineering, and the University of California, Berkeley from 1959-62 where he earned his BA in art.

== Career ==
Beasley ranks among the most productive sculptors of the post- Henry Moore/David Smith generation of abstract sculptors. Today, Beasley is recognised as one of the most noteworthy and innovative sculptors on the American West Coast. His work can be found in the permanent collection of 40 art museums around the world, including: Museum of Modern Art in New York City; the Guggenheim Museum, New York City; the Los Angeles County Museum of Art; the San Francisco Museum of Modern Art; the National Art Museum of China in Beijing; the Musee National d'Art Moderne-Centre Georges Pompidou in Paris; the Smithsonian Museum of American Art in Washington, DC; the Kunsthalle Mannheim in Germany; and the Islamic Museum in Cairo.

A 60 year retrospective exhibition on Bruce Beasley was held on the Grounds for Sculpture in Hamilton, New Jersey from May 2020 to January 2022.

== 1960s ==
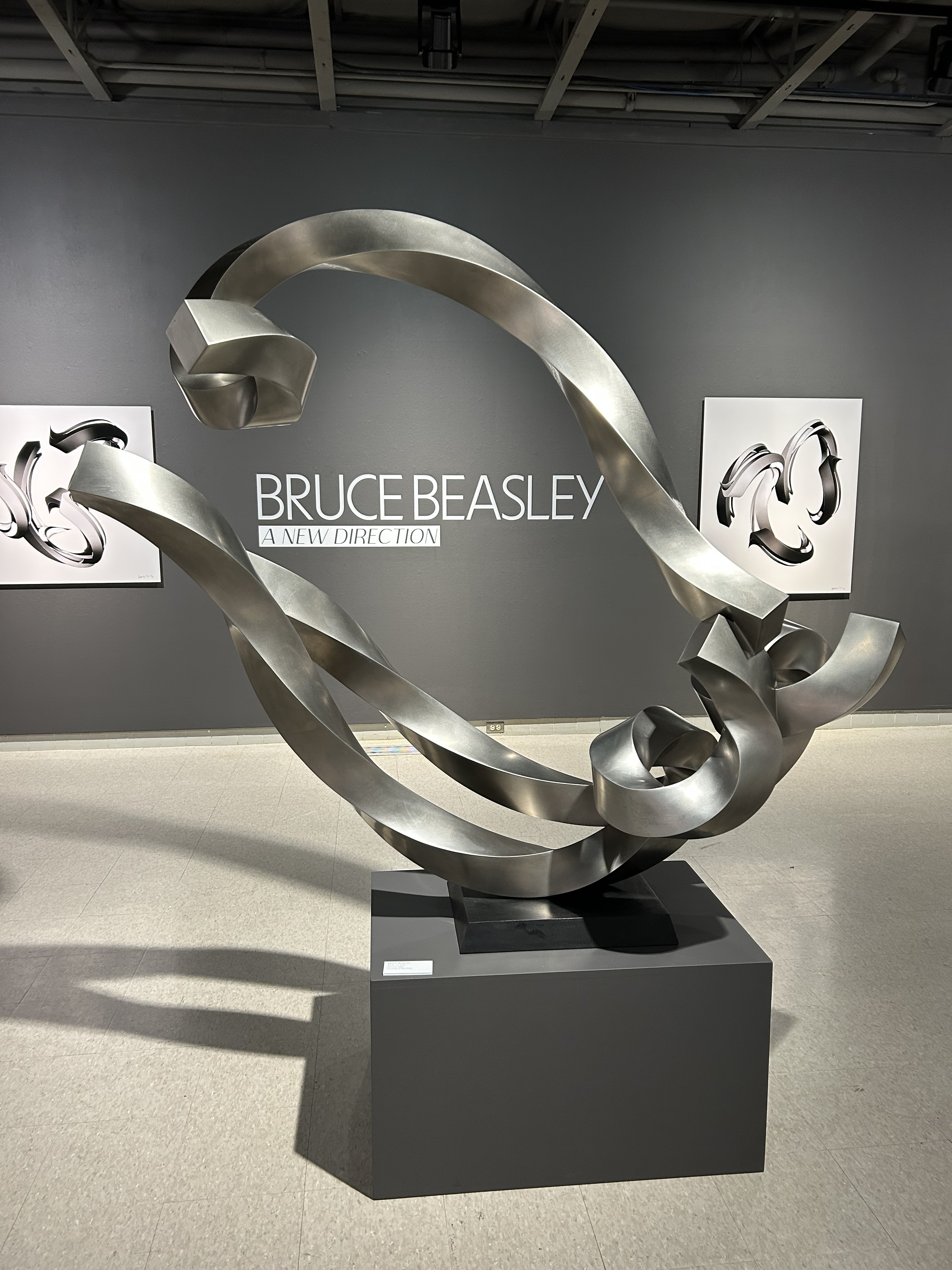
Bruce Beasley art exhibit in Fresno, CA

In the 1960s, Beasley's first work consisted of welded sculptures made from broken cast iron. This work brought him national recognition when in 1961 one of his sculptures was included in the ground breaking exhibition The Art of Assemblage at the New York, Museum of Modern Art a piece which appeared in an exhibition which Philip Linhares, Chief Curator of Art of the Oakland Museum of California referred to as "seminal". The following year his assemblage sculpture "Chorus" was acquired by New York's Museum of Modern Art, making Beasley the youngest artist to have work in the permanent collection.

In 1961, while a student at Berkeley, Beasley joined Peter Voulkos in building one of the first sculptor-built foundries, the storied Garbanzo Works that was instrumental in the Renaissance of bronze casting in American sculpture. Following an abstract esthetic, he began casting sculptures in bronze and aluminum. In 1963, he was one of eleven artists to represent the United States at the Biennale de Paris, where French Minister of Culture Andre Malraux awarded him the purchase prize.

In 1968, Beasley began investigating the use of transparency as a sculptural medium. He was successful in creating small transparent sculptures in cast acrylic but experts at Dupont and Rohm & Hass were convinced that it was impossible to do castings as large as Beasley envisioned. That year, the State of California invited Beasley to participate in a competition for a monumental sculpture for the state. At first, the jury was unaware that Beasley was experimenting with transparency as a sculptural medium and invited him based on his work in cast metal. Beasley was determined to pursue transparency and proposed a monumental cast acrylic sculpture. Upon seeing Beasley's proposal, they questioned the sculptor about its viability. He convinced them that creating what he envisioned was no problem but privately knew that he would have to invent a new process, which he did. His proposal for Apolymon, a transparent sculpture in cast acrylic won and he installed the piece in Sacramento in 1970.

== 1970s ==
Fascinated by the esthetics of transparency, Beasley worked in cast acrylic for the next ten years. In 1974, members of the undersea research community approached Beasley to see if he could adapt his technique to cast transparent bathyspheres for undersea exploration. He succeeded in creating the bathyspheres for Johnson Sea Link submersibles for Harbor Branch Oceanographic Institute. It was these submersibles that were deployed to locate the crew compartment on the bottom of the ocean after the Space Shuttle Challenger disintegrated upon liftoff in 1986.

Beasley continued to make transparent sculpture for the next ten years. His transparent sculptures were exhibited widely both in the US and abroad including solo exhibitions in 1972 at the DeYoung Museum in San Francisco, the Santa Barbara Museum of Art, the San Diego Museum of Art, and group shows including the Salon de Mai in Paris and at Expo 70 in Osaka, Japan.

== 1980s ==
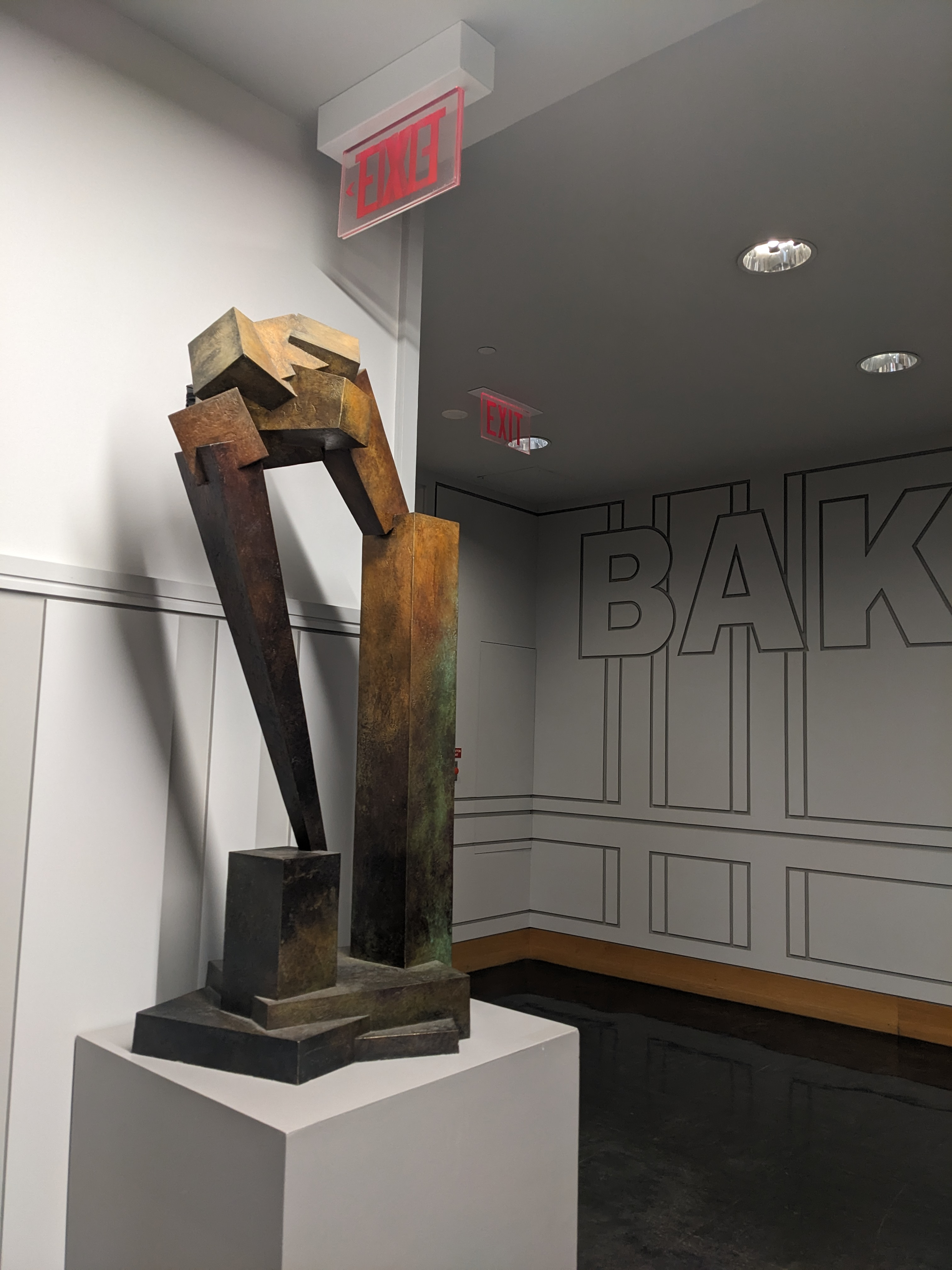
Bruce Beasley sculpture at Dartmouth College

In 1980, Beasley turned back to metal, exploring a more formal geometry with a series of large sculptures produced in both stainless steel and aluminum. He created a number of monumental commissions for public institutions including the San Francisco International Airport, Stanford University; the State of California; the State of Alaska; the Miami International Airport; the City of Eugene, Oregon; and Grounds for Sculpture in Hamilton, New Jersey.

1980 Visits Friend and colleague George Rickey in East Chatham, NY

In 1987, he turned to a new direction of work involving cube-like intersecting polyhedra. While most of these were made in cast or fabricated bronze, he also created them in carved granite. This work has been exhibited worldwide in more than 100 exhibitions in Europe and Asia. Public commissions for this series have included the cities of Oakland, California; Dortmund, Germany; Mannheim, Germany; Bad Homburg, Germany; Monterrey, Mexico; Palo Alto, California; as well as the University of Oregon and Miami University in Oxford, Ohio.

In 2008, Beasley began sculpting a new series of intersecting stainless steel disks. One of this series, commissioned by the Chinese government for the Beijing Summer Olympics is 15 feet tall and remains permanently installed as part of the Beijing Olympic Park. The Expo 2010 in Shanghai also commissioned a large sculpture in this series for permanent installation in Shanghai.

1993 Visits friend and colleague Eduardo Chillida in San Sebastian, Spain

1n 1994, visits colleague and friend Gio Pomodoro in Pietrasanta, Italy

== Publishing ==
- Bruce Beasley: Skulpturen (Bruce Beasley: Sculpture) (The Stadtiche Kunsthalle Mannheim, 1994) monograph which includes articles by Peter Selz and Manfred Fath, ISBN 3-89165-098-2
- Sculpture by Bruce Beasley (The Oakland Museum of California, 2005), monograph which includes articles by Albert Elsen and Peter Frank, ISBN 1-882140-35-4

== Works ==
- Big Red (1974), Eugene, Oregon
- Encounter (2003–2004), Eugene, Oregon
