= Nieuw Amsterdam (Salvador Dali) =

1974 object/sculpture by Salvador Dalí

Nieuw Amsterdam is a 1974 object/sculpture by Salvador Dalí done after an 1899 bronze statue bust of Chief White Eagle by the American sculptor and artist Charles Schreyvogel. It was then transformed by the Spanish-Catalan surrealist via his Paranoiac-critical method to include a painting executed upon the face of the bust of various doings in the Dutch West India Company colony of Nieuw Amsterdam.
