= Liberation (painting) =

1974 painting by Odd Nerdrum

- Artist: Odd Nerdrum
- Year: 1974
- Medium: Oil on canvas
- Dimensions: 202 cm × 283 cm (80 in × 111 in)
- Location: Private collection

Liberation (Norwegian: Frigjøring) is a 1974 painting by the Norwegian artist Odd Nerdrum. It depicts a room with a mattress where a couple have sexual intercourse with the woman on top of the passive man.

Nerdrum's art from the period 1968–1983 is characterized by everyday realism and left-wing politics. Liberation was created in this context, where the radical left propounded a sexual revolution as a way to create a socialist utopia by politicizing every aspect of human life, especially sexuality. Nerdrum made several paintings on the topic of what was considered sexual liberation. The most famous of these are Liberation from 1974 and Spring (Vår) from 1977.

== Provenance ==
The painting was first presented at Høstutstillingen in 1974. It was exhibited at the Oslo gallery Kunstnerforbundet in 1976 as part of the exhibition Odd Nerdrum Malerier ("Odd Nerdrum Paintings").
