= The Hope of a Condemned Man =

1974 series of three paintings by Joan Miró

- L'esperança del condemnat a mort (Catalan)
- Artist: Joan Miró
- Year: 1974
- Type: triptych
- Medium: acrylic on canvas
- Dimensions: 267 cm × 351 cm (105 in × 138 in)
- Location: Fundació Joan Miró; Barcelona

The Hope of a Condemned Man is a series of three paintings by Joan Miró in 1974 which are now part of the permanent collection of the Joan Miró Foundation in Barcelona.

== History ==
During the last years of Francoist Spain there were some controversial legal decisions that shocked the painter. Miró painted this triptych in reference to the hope of grace as he prayed for the life of the young anarchist Salvador Puig Antich finally executed by garotte.

This series directly recalls another 1968 painting titled Painting on white background for the cell of a recluse.

The works are the result of a two-year process during which Miró made several preparatory drawings with various ideas to approach the challenge. These drawings are preserved at the Miró Foundation.

In February 1974 he painted these ideas, but he didn't finish the artwork until a month later, coinciding with the execution of another anarchist.

Its odd, yet significant, that I finished my work on the same day that they killed that poor boy, Salvador Puig Antich. I finished the painting on the same day than they killed him, without me knowing it: a black on a white background, a black line is a cut because someone has the force and no mercy

— Joan Miró

(...) years ago, on a large canvas, I painted a stripe, a whiteline, and in another canvas, a blue stripe. And then one day ... when they gave that poor guy, Salvador Puig Antich. I felt that was all about. The day he was killed. I ended up on that canvas that killed him. Without knowing it.

- It was what?

- His death. The line is interrupted. A leaflet, which I call The hope of a condemned Man. I hope that these three paintings remain in Barcelona, at the Foundation.

- The relationship between these paintings and the drama of Puig Antich was not sought at the beginning?

- It was not an intellectual coincidence at all. A coincidence but a little magic ... how did you say?

— Joan Miró

== Description ==
Successive representations show a patch that changes color according to the transformation of a flowing black line with splashes of paint. The line tries to describe a form that can not be completed as it is unexpectedly interrupted. This parallels the tragic snuffing out of the life of the young garroted activist.

This work was created in 1974. The line comes fast, secure, multiple, from underground, reality, to take off on the horizon, the future. Miró knows that each line presents an enigma, his work as an artist has always been the same: on paper, on canvas, in cardboard, wood sculpture... filling the space of signs that give meaning to the work and his medium. Miró in his maturity flight away from the formulas of vocabulary to achieve expression. The paintings are characterized by heavy graphics, drawn with a single breath, without rejecting Miró traditional forms, but simplifying the gesture. Imposed increasingly growing the importance of the empty space. Miró reaches maximum difficulty arises when suggesting a poetic image, creating tension, expressing a certain mood with minimal resources. This is the reason why he use every time larger formats, despite the static, they seem to create dynamism.

== Context and influences ==
Miró painted these large scale works (as well as Bleu II) influenced under the impression that he got on his stay in the United States. The action painting by Jackson Pollock and the abstract expressionism by Robert Motherwell and Mark Rothko clearly influenced Miró, although that the forms of Miró are not abstract figures, but remain true to the nature, source of inspiration

In the art world there was a big disappointment as a result of the catastrophe of the World War and the atrocities that occurred, which left a society that had placed science and its progress to the development of the atomic bomb and had ended up being ruled again by the conservative classes. The art was going to be worth enjoyment become consumer value. In response to this position wealthy, many artists are inclined to experiment with forms of expression. One of the great figures of expressionism was Motherwell (1915–1991), who painted one of his most famous works with a long series Elegy to the Spanish Republic (1955–1960). The choice of the theme suggests painting a "subjective" reality of the (much more indirect than the Guernica on Picasso). Great artists appeared at the United States, like Pollock, Franz Kline or de Kooning with an energetic and gestural painting, and Rothko who didn't used figurative painting. The painting becomes a meditation on the screen to the viewer.

Miró's fascination for Japanese art and master SengaiGibon influenced many European and American abstract artists of the moment. The simplicity of the work of Sengai intriguing, combining geometric shapes with vertical texts caused a strong impact on Miró, who began a vocabulary of signs themselves, which Miró visual color experience the great power that supposed to make the spectator in front of three formats, a combination not only works separately, but to offer a completely new visual field that fills the viewer (TATE) There is a strong relationship between scarce resources and the dramatic impact TAT)

At the time Miró painted The Hope of a Condemned Man, we find a Europe post-May 68, Protestant and unhappy, and also find that Spain looks like the dying dictatorship of General Franco. At the same time there is a Joan Miró fully recognized and also is filled with skills to find creative new ways. Miró had visited the Japan, where there had been several exhibitions. Orientalism always represented by a spring of Miró received influences.

Miró has been defined as an international Catalan, which had an internal exile because of Franco, a political artist, surrealist avant-garde and modernist.

Miró himself says that the artist is a "person with a special civic responsibility, your voice must speak for the silent, and his work for the emancipation", understood that his work had the obligation to promote, to claim, talk, to serve man.
