= List of public art in Eugene, Oregon =

List of public artworks in Eugene, Oregon, U.S.

Image	Title / subject	Location and coordinates	Date	Artist / designer	Type	Material	Dimensions	Designation	Owner / administrator	Notes
	Akbar's Garden	Straub Quadrangle, University of Oregon	1983–1984	Lee Kelly	sculpture	aluminum	17 feet (5.2 m)			
	Alan Turing	Willamette Hall, University of Oregon	1988	Wayne Chabre	sculpture	copper	3 feet (0.91 m) x 1.5 feet (0.46 m) x 1.5 feet (0.46 m)			
	Bear Gargoyle	University of Oregon Museum of Natural and Cultural History	1988	Wayne Chabre	sculpture	copper, stainless steel	5.5 feet (1.7 m) x 4 feet (1.2 m) x 5 feet (1.5 m)		University of Oregon	
	Big Red	Washington Jefferson Park	1974	Bruce Beasley	sculpture	steel	12 feet (3.7 m), 9 inches (23 cm) x 11 feet (3.4 m), 6 inches (15 cm) x 36 feet (11 m), 5 inches (13 cm)			
	Statue of Bill Bowerman	Hayward Field, University of Oregon	2000	Diana Lee Jackson	statue					
	Bison	Lawrence Hall, University of Oregon	c. 1960	unknown	statue	stone	22.5 inches (0.57 m) x 16 inches (0.41 m) x 28 inches (0.71 m)		University of Oregon	
	Brown and Black Asteroid	University of Oregon Museum of Natural and Cultural History		unknown	sculpture	wire mesh, fiberglass, resin	6.5 feet (2.0 m) x 12 feet (3.7 m) x 5 feet (1.5 m)		University of Oregon	
	Cascade Charley	Cascade Courtyard, University of Oregon	1991	Alice Wingwall	fountain, sculpture	concrete, tile, red marble				
	Drosophila Fly Head		1988	Wayne Chabre	relief	copper	3.5 feet (1.1 m) x 3 feet (0.91 m) x 2.5 feet (0.76 m)		University of Oregon	
	Einstein Gargoyle	Willamette Hall, University of Oregon	1986	Wayne Chabre	bust	copper			University of Oregon	
	Emergence	Education Courtyard, University of Oregon	1981	Don Eckland	statue	bronze	68 inches (1.7 m)			
	Encounter	Jordan Schnitzer Museum of Art	2003–2004	Bruce Beasley	statue	bronze				
	Eugene Skinner	Eugene Public Library		Jim Carpenter	statue	bronze				
	The Falconer	University of Oregon		James Lee Hansen	sculpture	bronze	3 feet (0.91 m) x 18 inches (0.46 m) x 14 inches (0.36 m)		University of Oregon	Stolen in 2008
	Great Blue Heron	East 13th Avenue and Alder Street	2012	Jud Turner	statue	recycled materials, steel	16 feet (4.9 m)			
	Indian Maiden and Fawn	Jordan Schnitzer Museum of Art	1917–1924	Alexander Phimister Proctor	statue	bronze	74 inches (190 cm)		Jordan Schnitzer Museum of Art	
	John von Neumann	Willamette Hall, University of Oregon	1987	Wayne Chabre	relief	copper	3 feet (0.91 m) x 1.5 feet (0.46 m) x 1.5 feet (0.46 m)		University of Oregon	
	Lady	Jordan Schnitzer Museum of Art		Jan Zach	sculpture	steel	14 feet (4.3 m)		University of Oregon	
	Luna			Ellen Tykeson	sculpture				University of Oregon	
	Marie Curie Gargoyle		1989	Wayne Chabre	relief	copper	2.5 feet (0.76 m) x 2 feet (0.61 m) x 1.5 feet (0.46 m)		University of Oregon	
	Maxwell & Demon Gargoyle	Willamette Hall, University of Oregon	1989	Wayne Chabre	low-relief	copper	3.15 feet (0.96 m) x 2.5 feet (0.76 m) x 1.5 feet (0.46 m)		University of Oregon	
	The Pioneer Mother	University of Oregon	1932	Alexander Phimister Proctor	statue	bronze			University of Oregon	
	The Pioneer	University of Oregon	1919	Alexander Phimister Proctor	statue	bronze	13 feet (4.0 m)		University of Oregon	
	Procession	Hilton Hotel	1982	Dallas Cole, Scott Wylie	mural, sculpture	brick, tile	10 feet (3.0 m), 4 inches (10 cm) x 30 feet (9.1 m), 6 inches (15 cm)			
	Prometheus	Jordan Schnitzer Museum of Art	1958	Jan Zach	statue	iron	8.5 feet (2.6 m) x 5.5 feet (1.7 m) x 3 feet (0.91 m)		University of Oregon	
	Raven Gargoyle		1987	Wayne Chabre	relief	copper, stainless steel	4 feet (1.2 m) x 3 feet (0.91 m) x 4 feet (1.2 m)		University of Oregon	
	Reflections of a Summer Day		1974	Duane Loppnow	sculpture	painted steel	6.5 feet (2.0 m) x 4 feet (1.2 m) x 4 feet (1.2 m)		University of Oregon	
	Rosa Parks	Rosa Parks Plaza	2009	Pete Helzer	statue	bronze				
	Salmon Gargoyle		1987	Wayne Chabre	sculpture	copper, stainless steel	5 feet (1.5 m) x 3 feet (0.91 m) x 8.5 feet (2.6 m)		University of Oregon	
	The Storyteller	Broadway Plaza		Pete Helzer	statue	bronze				
	Three Standing Forms	Park Blocks	1959	Jan Zach	sculpture	iron, rock	49 inches (1.2 m) x 66 inches (1.7 m) x 20 inches (0.51 m)			
	Trapezoid E	Federal Building and U.S. Courthouse	1975	Robert Maki	sculpture	aluminum	12 feet (3.7 m) x 10 feet (3.0 m) x 15 feet (4.6 m)			
	Untitled	Park Blocks	1952	Tom Hardy	fountain, sculpture	bronze, concrete, stone	24 inches (0.61 m) x 40 feet (12 m) x 40 feet (12 m)			
	Wind Fence	Lillis Business Complex	1952	Ned Kahn	sculpture	aluminum				
	Wind-Rain Song	Hult Center for the Performing Arts	1982	Weltzin Blix	sculpture	bronze	20 feet (6.1 m) x 22 feet (6.7 m), 8 inches (20 cm) x 1 foot (0.30 m), 1 inch (2.5 cm)			
	Zebra Fish		1989	Wayne Chabre	relief	copper	3.5 feet (1.1 m) x 3 feet (0.91 m) x 2 feet (0.61 m)		University of Oregon	

== See also ==
- Flight Patterns
- Performing Frogs
