= Isaac Newton Gargoyle =

Public sculpture in Oregon

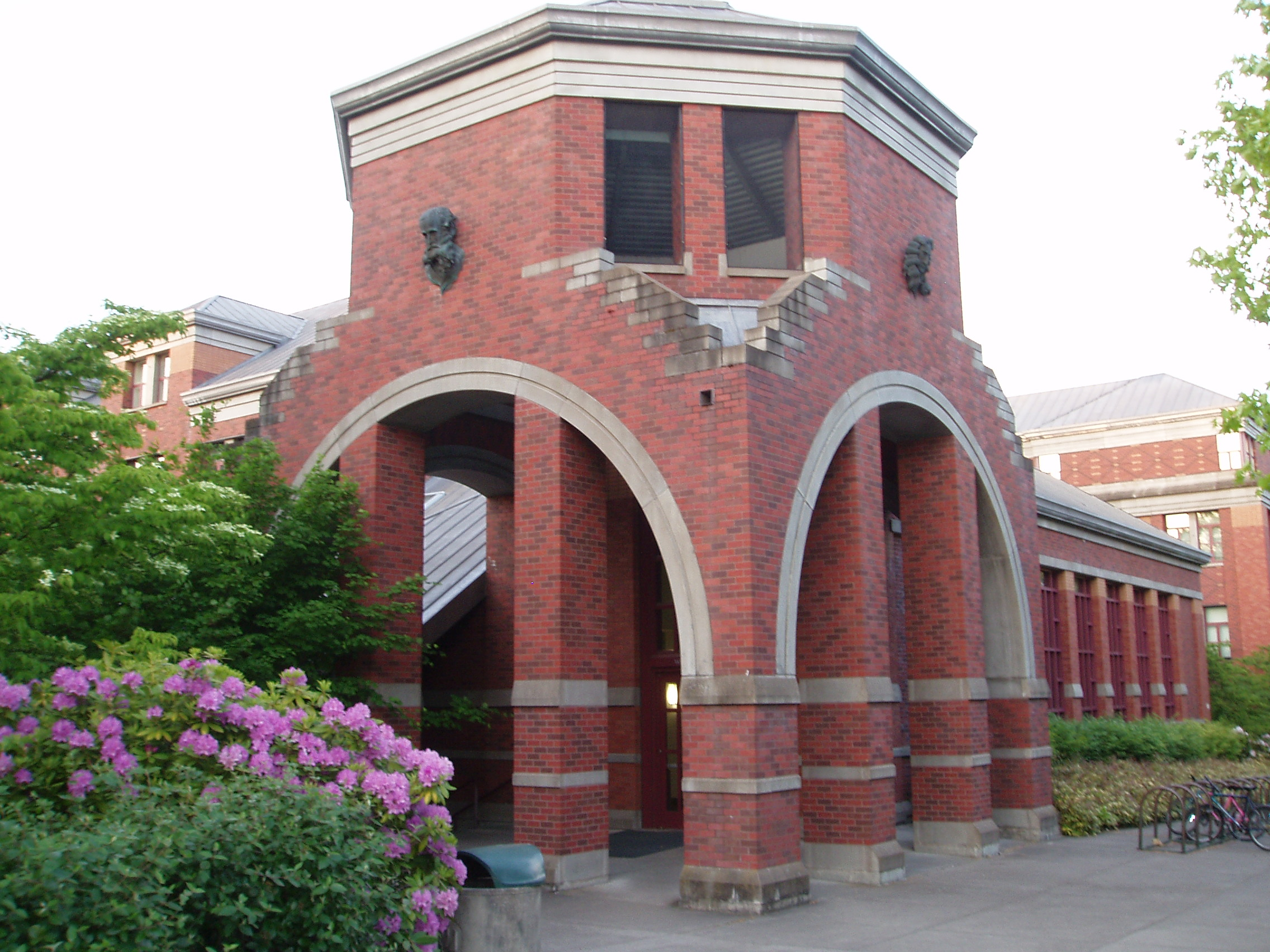
- The sculpture (right) attached to the southwest corner of Willamette Hall in 2007
- Artist: Wayne Chabre
- Medium: Copper sculpture
- Subject: Isaac Newton
- Location: Eugene, Oregon, United States; 44°02′44.25″N 123°04′23.67″W

Isaac Newton Gargoyle is an outdoor 1988–1989 hammered copper sheet relief depicting Isaac Newton by Wayne Chabre, installed on the exterior of Willamette Hall on the University of Oregon campus, in Eugene, Oregon. The sculpture is part of the collection of the Oregon Arts Commission, and administered by the University of Oregon. It was surveyed by the Smithsonian Institution's "Save Outdoor Sculpture!" program in 1994.

The piece is one of a series by Chabre at the Eugene campus that includes scientists and mathematicians Albert Einstein (Einstein Gargoyle, 1986), Marie Curie (Marie Curie Gargoyle, 1989), James Clerk Maxwell (Maxwell & Demon Gargoyle, 1989), Alan Turing (Alan Turing, 1988), John von Neumann (John von Neumann, 1987), and Thomas Condon; a fruit fly (Drosophila Fly Head, 1988); and a school of zebrafish.

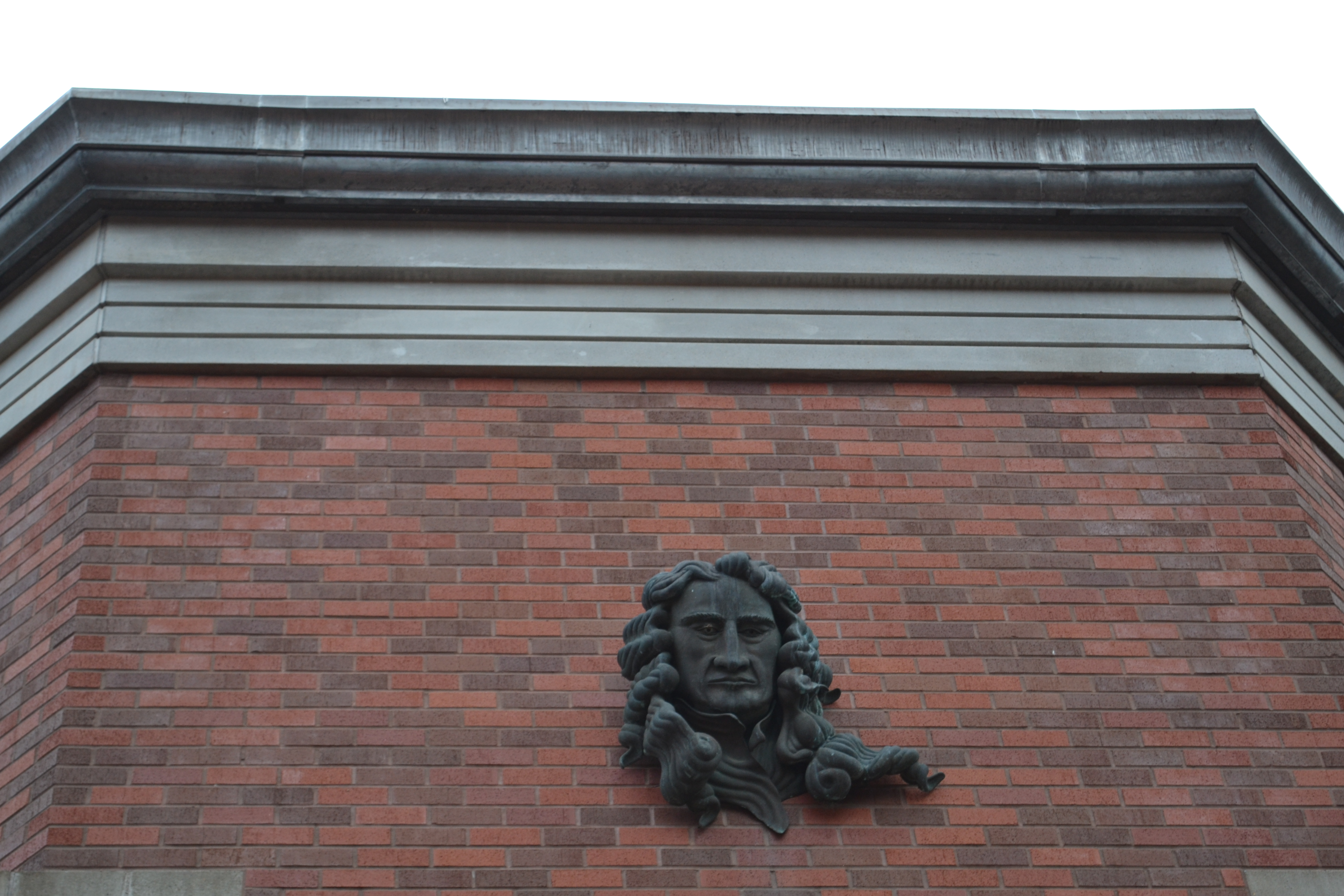
The sculpture in 2011
