= Statue of Alan Turing =

Statue of Alan Turing may refer to:

- Statue of Alan Turing, Bletchley Park, Buckinghamshire, England
- Alan Turing Memorial, Manchester, England

== See also ==
- Alan Turing (sculpture), Eugene, Oregon
