= John von Neumann (sculpture) =

Copper sculpture by Wayne Chabre in Eugene, Oregon, U.S.

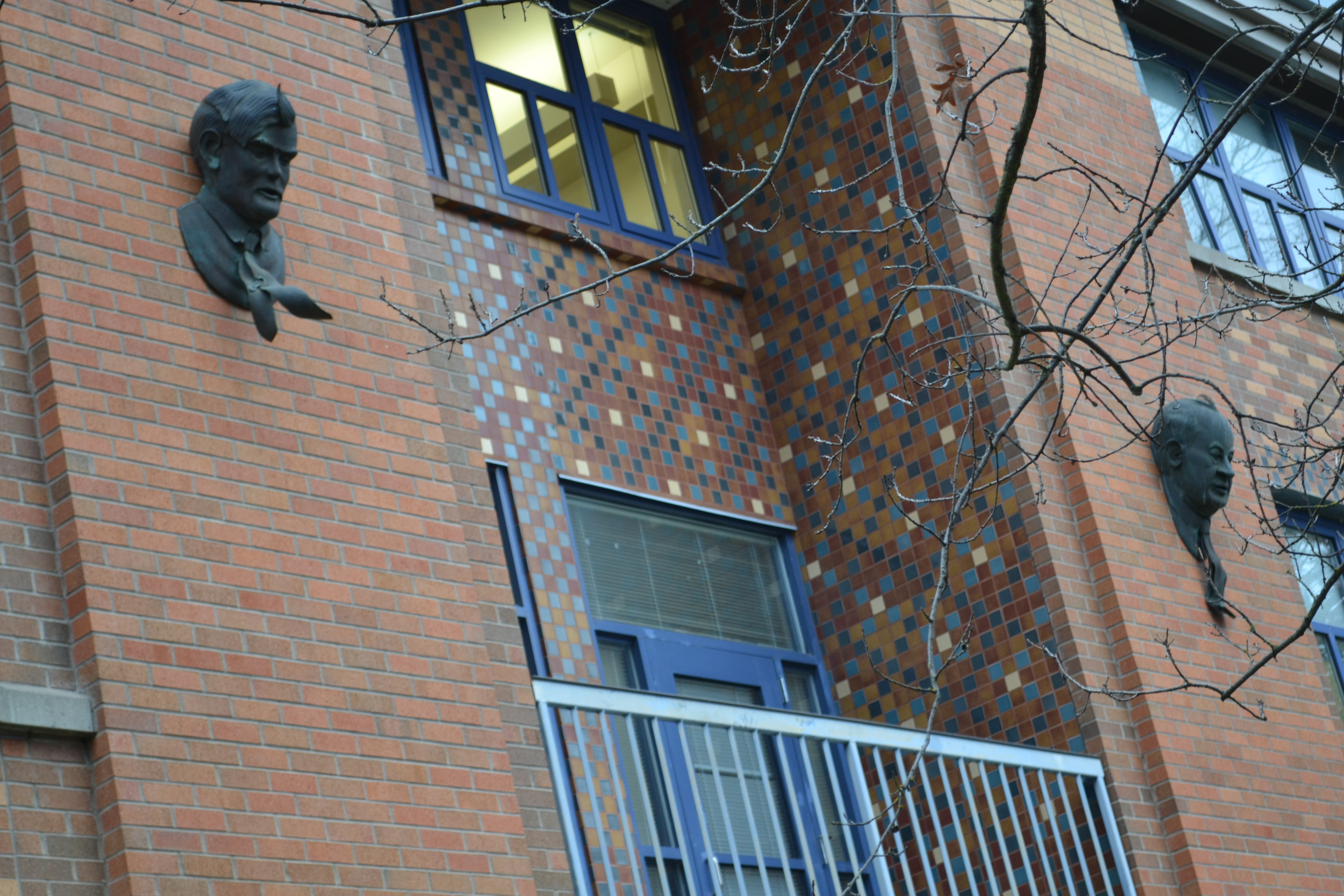
- The sculpture (right) and Alan Turing (left), attached to Deschutes Hall in 2011
- Artist: Wayne Chabre
- Year: 1987
- Type: Sculpture
- Medium: Copper
- Subject: John von Neumann
- Dimensions: 0.91 m × 0.46 m × 0.46 m (3 ft × 1.5 ft × 1.5 ft)
- Condition: "Treatment needed" (1993)
- Location: Eugene, Oregon, United States; 44.04566°N 123.07103°W
- Owner: University of Oregon

John von Neumann, also known as John von Neumann Gargoyle and Portrait Head of von Neumann, is an outdoor 1987 copper sculpture by Wayne Chabre, attached to the exterior of Deschutes Hall on the University of Oregon campus in Eugene, Oregon, United States.

The sculpture depicts the Hungarian-born American mathematician John von Neumann. The relief head is made of hammered copper sheet and measures approximately 3 feet (0.91 m) x 1.5 feet (0.46 m) x 1.5 feet (0.46 m). It cost around $2,500. The sculpture's condition was deemed "treatment needed" by Smithsonian Institution's "Save Outdoor Sculpture!" program in 1993. It is administered by the University of Oregon.

The piece is one of a series by Chabre at the Eugene campus that includes scientists and mathematicians Albert Einstein (Einstein Gargoyle, 1986), Sir Isaac Newton (Isaac Newton Gargoyle), Marie Curie (Marie Curie Gargoyle, 1989), James Clerk Maxwell (Maxwell & Demon Gargoyle, 1989), Alan Turing (Alan Turing, 1988), John von Neumann, and Thomas Condon; a fruit fly (Drosophila Fly Head, 1988); and a school of zebrafish.

== See also ==
- 1987 in art
