= Flying Ducks =

American avian wall sculpture at the University of Oregon

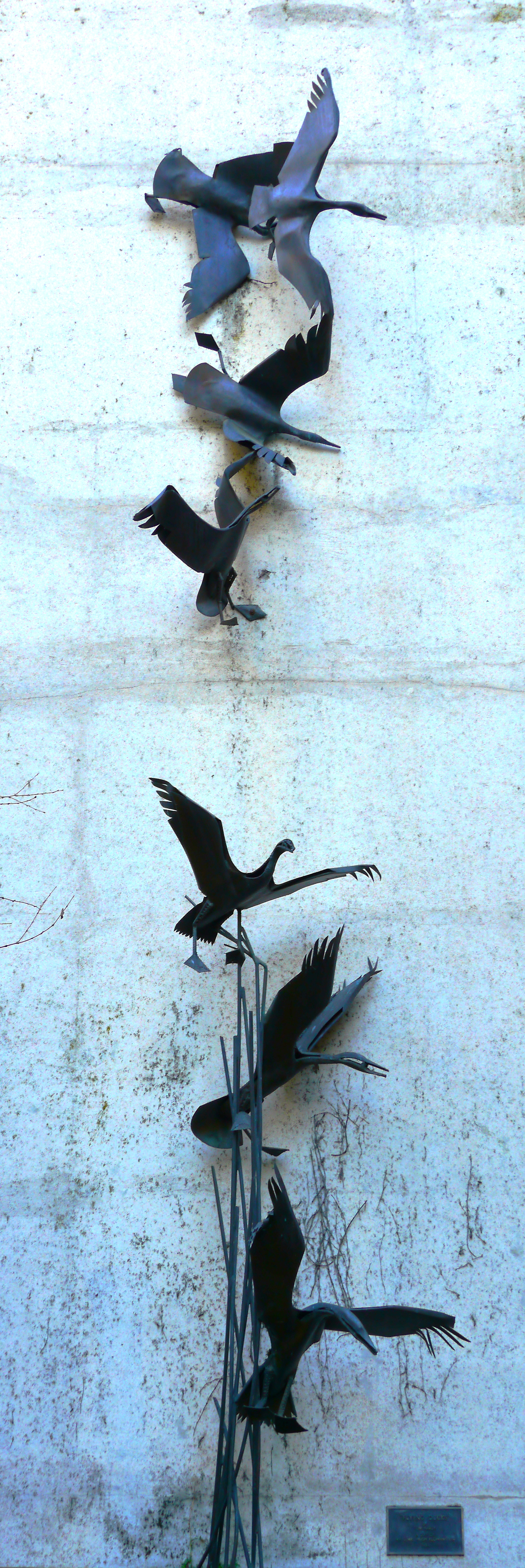
- The sculpture in 2017
- Artist: Tom Hardy
- Year: 1970
- Location: Eugene, Oregon, United States; 44°2′48.2″N 123°4′31.5″W
- Owner: University of Oregon

Flying Ducks is a 1970 or 1983 sculpture by Tom Hardy, installed on the west façade of Lawrence Hall, on the University of Oregon campus, in Eugene, Oregon, United States.

== Description and history ==
The artwork was donated to the School of Architecture and Allied Arts in 1984 by Hugh Klopfenstein and his wife.

The metal sculpture is approximately 20 feet (6.1 m) x 4 feet (1.2 m) x 4 feet (1.2 m), and its concrete base measures approximately 4 feet (1.2 m) x 3 feet (0.91 m) x 3 feet (0.91 m). It was surveyed by Smithsonian Institution's "Save Outdoor Sculpture!" program in 1994, and was previously installed at Willamette Hall.

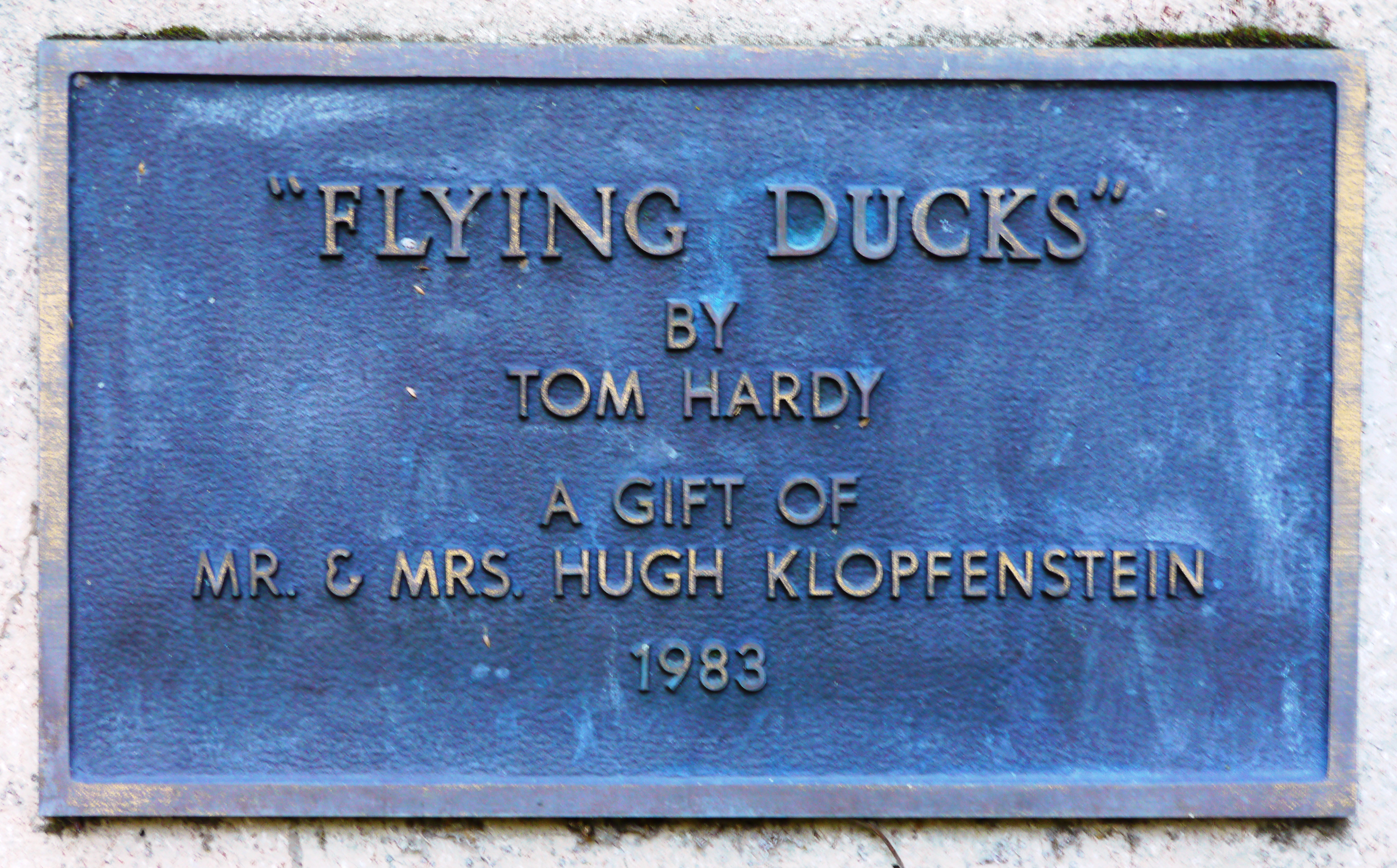
Plaque

== See also ==
- 1970 in art
