= Thomas Condon: Portrait of Condon =

Sculpture in Eugene, Oregon, U.S.

- The sculpture, shown from below
- Artist: Wayne Chabre
- Year: 1989
- Medium: Copper sheet sculpture
- Subject: Thomas Condon
- Location: Eugene, Oregon, United States; 44.04613°N 123.07344°W

Thomas Condon: Portrait of Condon, also known as Thomas Condon Medallion, is a hammered copped sheet sculpture depicting Thomas Condon by Wayne Chabre, installed on the exterior of the University of Oregon's Geology Building, in Eugene, Oregon, United States. The portrait, created in 1989, measures approximately 4 feet (1.2 m), 10 inches (25 cm) x 4 feet (1.2 m), 10 inches (25 cm) x 2 feet (0.61 m) and cost $3,139. It was surveyed by the Smithsonian Institution's "Save Outdoor Sculpture!" program in 1993.

== See also ==
- 1989 in art
