= Stephen Kettle =

British sculptor (born 1966)

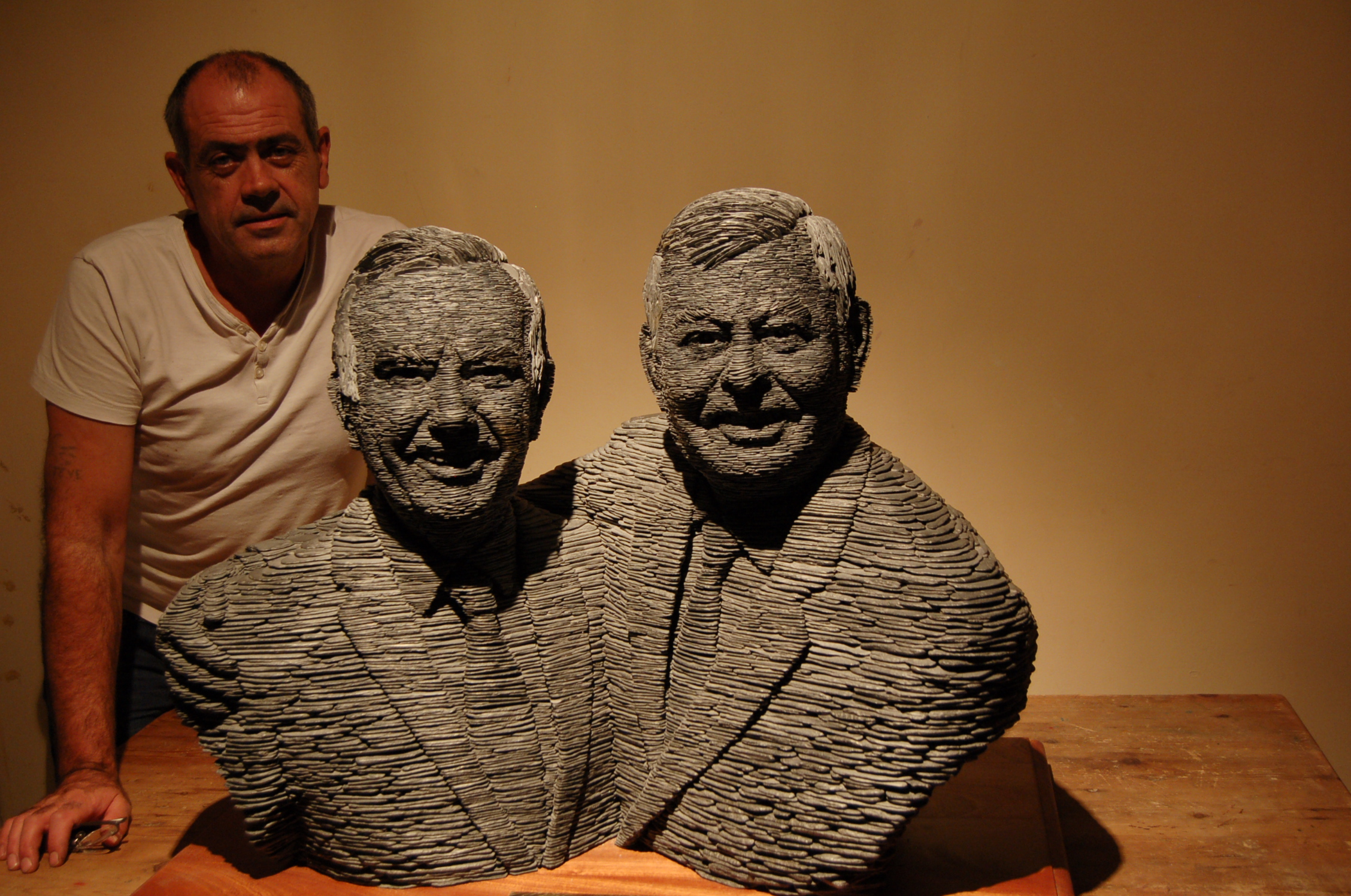
- Kettle with his sculpture of Sir Donald Gosling and Sir Ronald Hobson, founders of NCP car parks
- Born: 12 July 1966; Castle Bromwich
- Occupation: Sculptor

Stephen Kettle (born 12 July 1966 in Castle Bromwich, Warwickshire, England) is a British sculptor who works exclusively with slate.

== Career ==
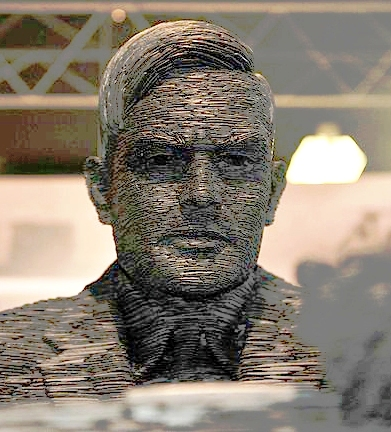
Detail of the slate statue of Alan Turing by Stephen Kettle at Bletchley Park in 2007

Kettle is a self-taught sculptor with no formal training. His best-known works include a slate sculpture of R. J. Mitchell, designer of the Supermarine Spitfire, held by the Science Museum, London. The sculpture was created in 2005 to commemorate Mitchell's life and work. and a life-size statue of Alan Turing, the founder of computer science and Enigma codebreaker, commissioned by the American philanthropist Sidney Frank for Bletchley Park in Buckinghamshire.

Besides the statues of Turing and Mitchell, other notable works by Kettle include portrait busts of the following:

- George Zambellas, first sea lord at RNAS Yeovilton
- Winston Churchill in Buckingham Palace
- Frederick Barclay at the London Ritz
- Donald Gosling
- Ronald Hobson
- A double portrait of King Charles III and Queen Camilla in the grounds of Highgrove House in Gloucestershire.

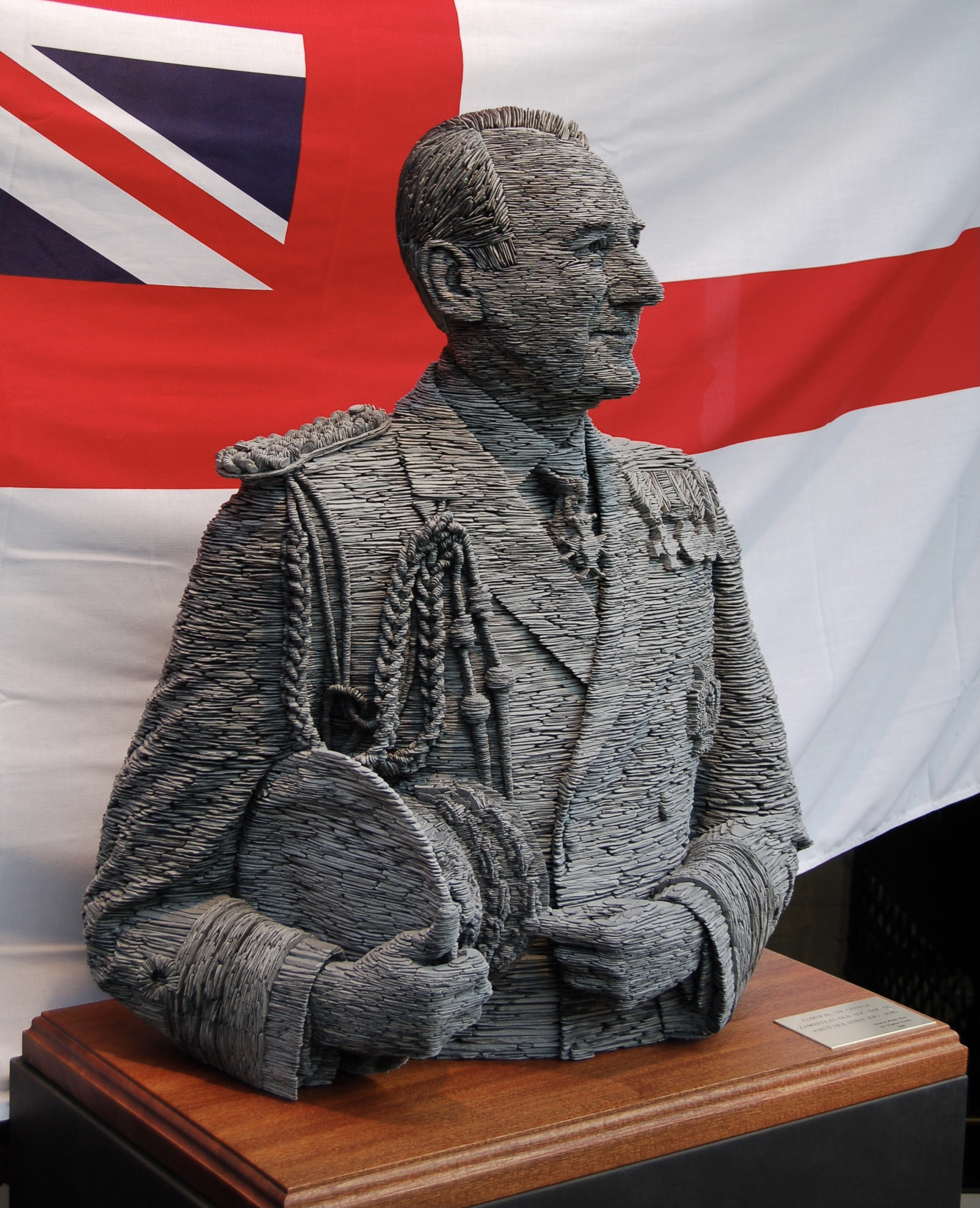
Sculpture by Kettle of George Zambellas at RNAS Yeovilton

== Personal life ==
Kettle lives with his wife and three children in west London.
