= Condon Butte =

- Location within Oregon

Highest point
- Elevation: 5,901 ft (1,799 m) NGVD 29
- Prominence: 301 ft (92 m)
- Coordinates: 44°13′29″N 121°50′25″W

Geography
- Location: Lane County, Oregon, U.S.
- Topo map: USGS North Sister

Condon Butte is a 5,901-foot (1,799 m) summit in Lane County, Oregon, in the United States.

The butte was named for Thomas Condon a Congregationalist minister and professor of geology at the University of Oregon. The butte is in the Three Sisters Wilderness Area which is part of the Willamette National Forest.
