= Grasshopper (sculpture) =

1988 sculpture by Wayne Chabre in Salem, Oregon, U.S.

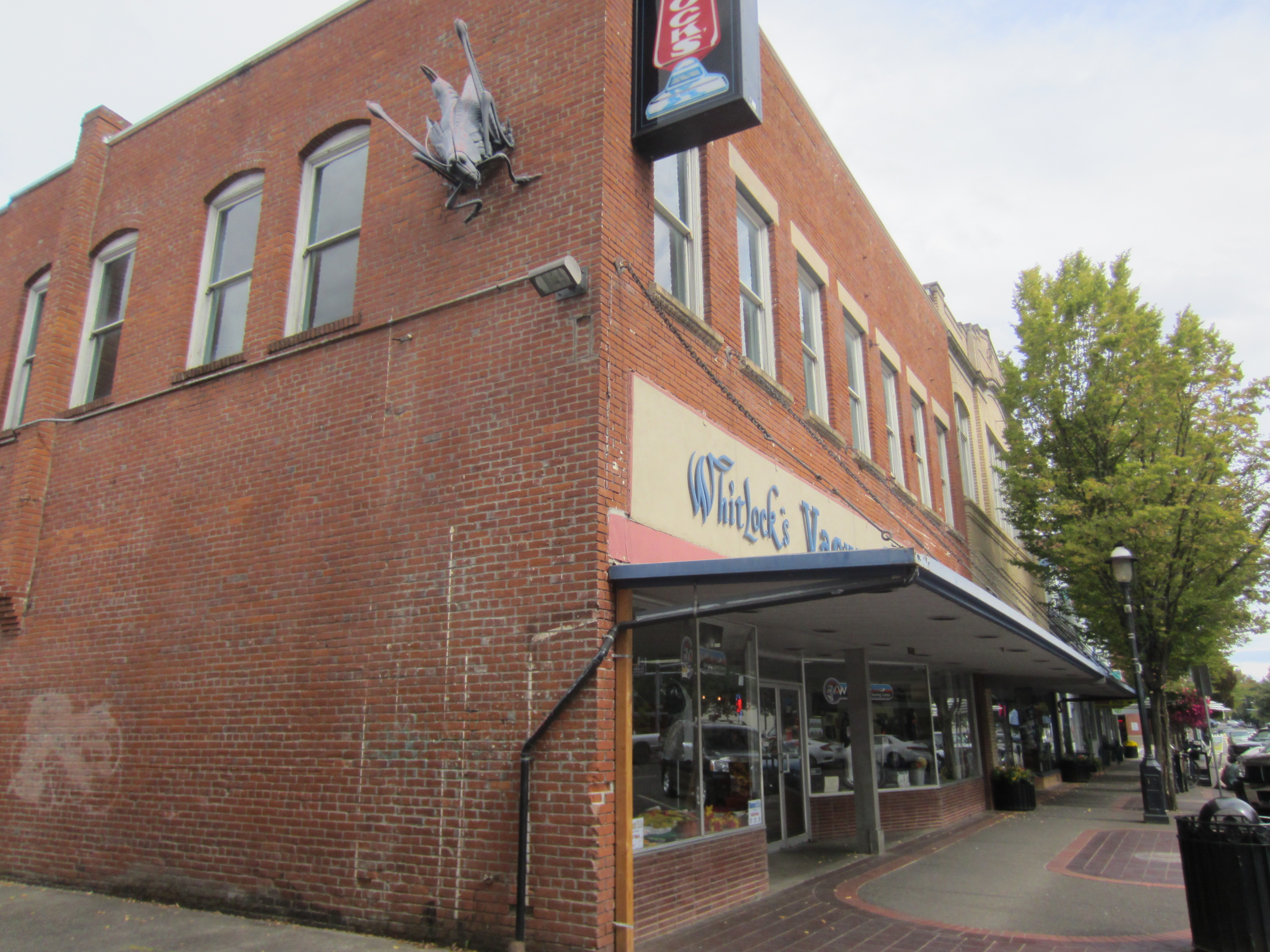
- The sculpture in 2018
- Artist: Wayne Chabre
- Year: 1988
- Type: Sculpture
- Medium: Copper
- Subject: Grasshopper
- Dimensions: 1.5 m × 0.76 m × 0.61 m (5 ft × 2.5 ft × 2 ft)
- Condition: "Treatment needed" (1993)
- Location: Salem, Oregon, United States; 44.9410°N 123.0374°W

Grasshopper is an outdoor 1988 copper sculpture by Wayne Chabre, located in Salem, Oregon, United States.

== Description and history ==
Wayne Chabre's Grasshopper, dedicated in 1988, depicts an insect of the same name, mounted in a head-down position on the exterior brick wall of a building at 455 Court Street Northeast. The brazed copper sculpture measures 5 feet (1.5 m) x 2.5 feet (0.76 m) x 2 feet (0.61 m). It was surveyed and considered "treatment needed" by the Smithsonian Institution's "Save Outdoor Sculpture!" program in August 1993, and was administered by the City of Salem's Community Development department at that time.

== See also ==
- 1988 in art
