= Zebra Fish (sculpture) =

Sculpture in Eugene, Oregon, U.S.

- The sculpture in October 2015
- Artist: Wayne Chabre
- Year: 1989
- Type: Sculpture
- Medium: Copper
- Dimensions: 8.9 cm × 7.6 cm × 5.1 cm (3.5 in × 3 in × 2 in)
- Condition: "Treatment needed" (1993)
- Location: Eugene, Oregon, United States; 44.04640°N 123.07217°W
- Owner: University of Oregon

Zebra Fish is an outdoor 1989 sculpture by Wayne Chabre, installed at the University of Oregon campus in Eugene, Oregon, in the United States. The hammered copper sheet high-relief measures approximately 3.5 feet (1.1 m) x 3 feet (0.91 m) x 2 feet (0.61 m). It was surveyed and deemed "treatment needed" by the Smithsonian Institution's "Save Outdoor Sculpture!" in March 1993. It is administered by the University of Oregon.

== See also ==
- 1989 in art
