= Wayne Chabre =

American sculptor (born 1947)

- Born: 1947 (age 78–79)
- Education: Gonzaga University
- Known for: Sculpture
- Website: waynechabre.com

Wayne Chabre (born 1947) is an American sculptor from Walla Walla, Washington. His works have been described as "whimsical". Many of his sculptures are functional, such as gargoyles and downspouts; railings and gates; lighting, pavilions, fountains, and benches.

== Early life and education ==
Chabre was born in 1947 and raised on a farm in Walla Walla County, Washington. He attended Gonzaga University in Spokane, then joined the Peace Corps, where he served as a graphic designer in the Agricultural Information Service in Lesotho, Africa. After his Peace Corps service he lived in Estacada, Oregon for three years, then moved to Portland, Oregon. In 1975 he returned to Walla Walla.

== Public art ==
=== Washington ===
Many of Chabre's works are commissioned by the Washington State Arts Commission under a construction set-aside program. His works are displayed to the public in Kirkland, Washington; Mount Tahoma High School in Tacoma; at a fire station in Seattle, Mercer Island; Waitsburg; Washington State University Vancouver; and elsewhere.

=== Oregon ===
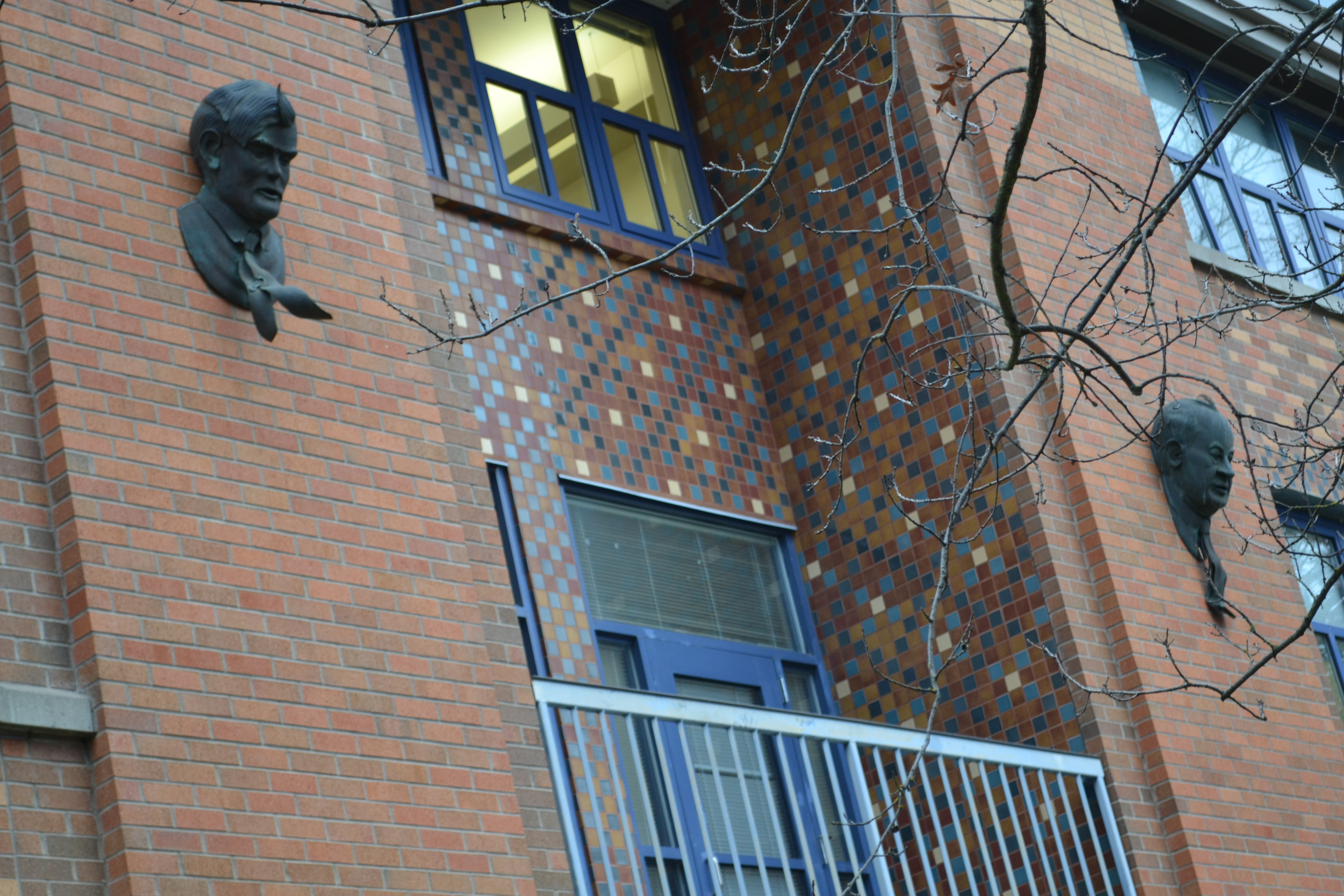
John von Neumann (right) and Alan Turing (left), attached to Willamette Hall on the University of Oregon campus

A number of his pieces are at the University of Oregon in Eugene, where he created a series of 12 gargoyles, including:

- Thomas Condon (Thomas Condon: Portrait of Condon)
- Marie Curie (Marie Curie Gargoyle)
- Albert Einstein (Einstein Gargoyle)
- James Clerk Maxwell (Maxwell & Demon Gargoyle)
- Isaac Newton (Isaac Newton Gargoyle)
- Alan Turing (Alan Turing)
- John von Neumann (John von Neumann)
- a fruit fly (Drosophila Fly Head)
- a school of zebrafish (Zebra Fish)

The University of Oregon Museum of Natural and Cultural History also displays four gargoyles: Bear Gargoyle, Salmon Gargoyle, Raven Gargoyle, and Wolf Gargoyle.

The city of Cannon Beach purchased his piece A Delicate Balance. Grasshopper is displayed in Salem, and a pair of animal sculptures is displayed at the public library in Bend (Otter Knot and Salmon Dance). Chabre created the entrance gates to Oregon Zoo (formerly the Washington Park Zoo) in Portland. He also created the bronze bas-relief entry panels to the Multnomah County Building in Portland. His "Grove" bench is at Western Oregon University, Monmouth.

=== California ===
The city of Stockton, California owns a Chabre sculpture, The Great Combine, commissioned in 2009. Also in Stockton, the Joan Darrah Marina has 23 pieces created by Chabre: A large cast bronze and stainless steel bench, 12 water jet cut aluminum medallions on light poles lining the marina, and 10 cast bronze finials atop gateways to the boat slips.
