= Alan Turing Memorial =

Memorial in Manchester, England

Coordinates: 53°28′36.2″N 2°14′9.7″W

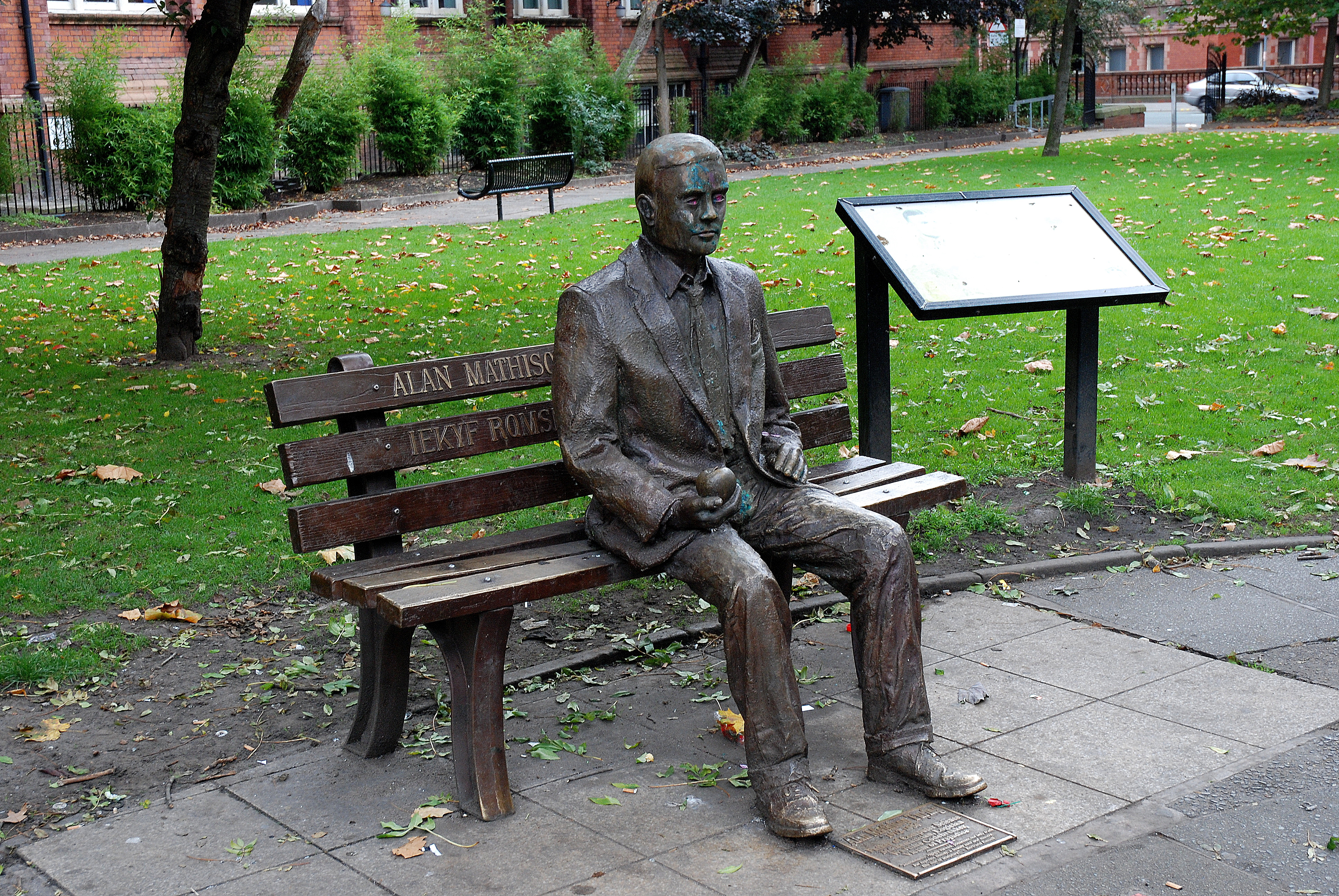
- Interactive map of Alan Turing Memorial
- Location: Sackville Gardens, Manchester, England
- Type: Sculpture
- Dedicated date: Alan Turing

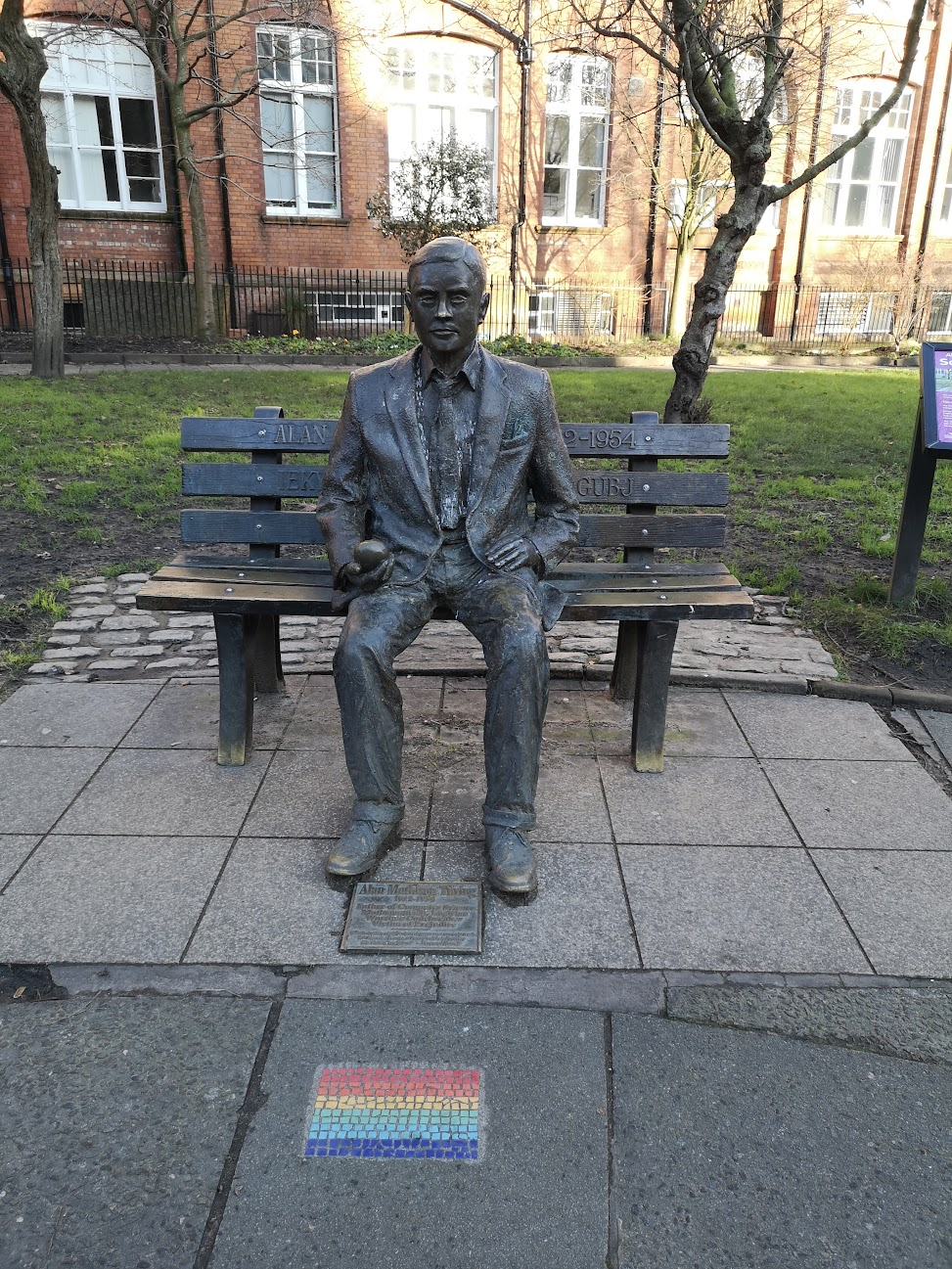
Alan Turing statue in Sackville Gardens

The Alan Turing Memorial, situated in Sackville Gardens in Manchester, England, is a sculpture in memory of Alan Turing, a pioneer of modern computing.

Turing is believed to have taken his own life in 1954, two years after being convicted of gross indecency (i.e. homosexual acts). As such, he is as much a gay icon as an icon of computing, and the memorial is situated near to Canal Street, Manchester's gay village.

Turing is depicted sitting on a bench situated in a central position in the park, holding an apple. On Turing's left is the former Sackville Street Building of the University of Manchester, and on his right is Canal Street. Sculptor Glyn Hughes said the park was chosen as the location for the statue because "it's got the university science buildings...on one side, and it's got all the gay bars on the other side, where apparently he spent most of his evenings."

The statue was unveiled on 23 June, Turing's birthday, in 2001. It was conceived by Richard Humphry, a barrister from Stockport, who set up the Alan Turing Memorial Fund in order to raise the necessary funds. Humphry had come up with the idea of a statue after seeing Hugh Whitemore's play Breaking the Code, starring Derek Jacobi. Jacobi became the patron of the fund. Hughes, an industrial sculptor from Adlington near Westhoughton, was commissioned to sculpt the statue.

Roy Jackson (who had previously raised funds for HIV/AIDS and Gay Awareness in Manchester) was asked to assist in the funding raising to make the memorial happen. Within 12 months, through donations and a "village lottery", £15,000 was raised. It would have cost c. £50,000 to cast the statue at a British foundry, and so it was instead cast by the Tianjin Focus Company in China.

== Inscriptions ==
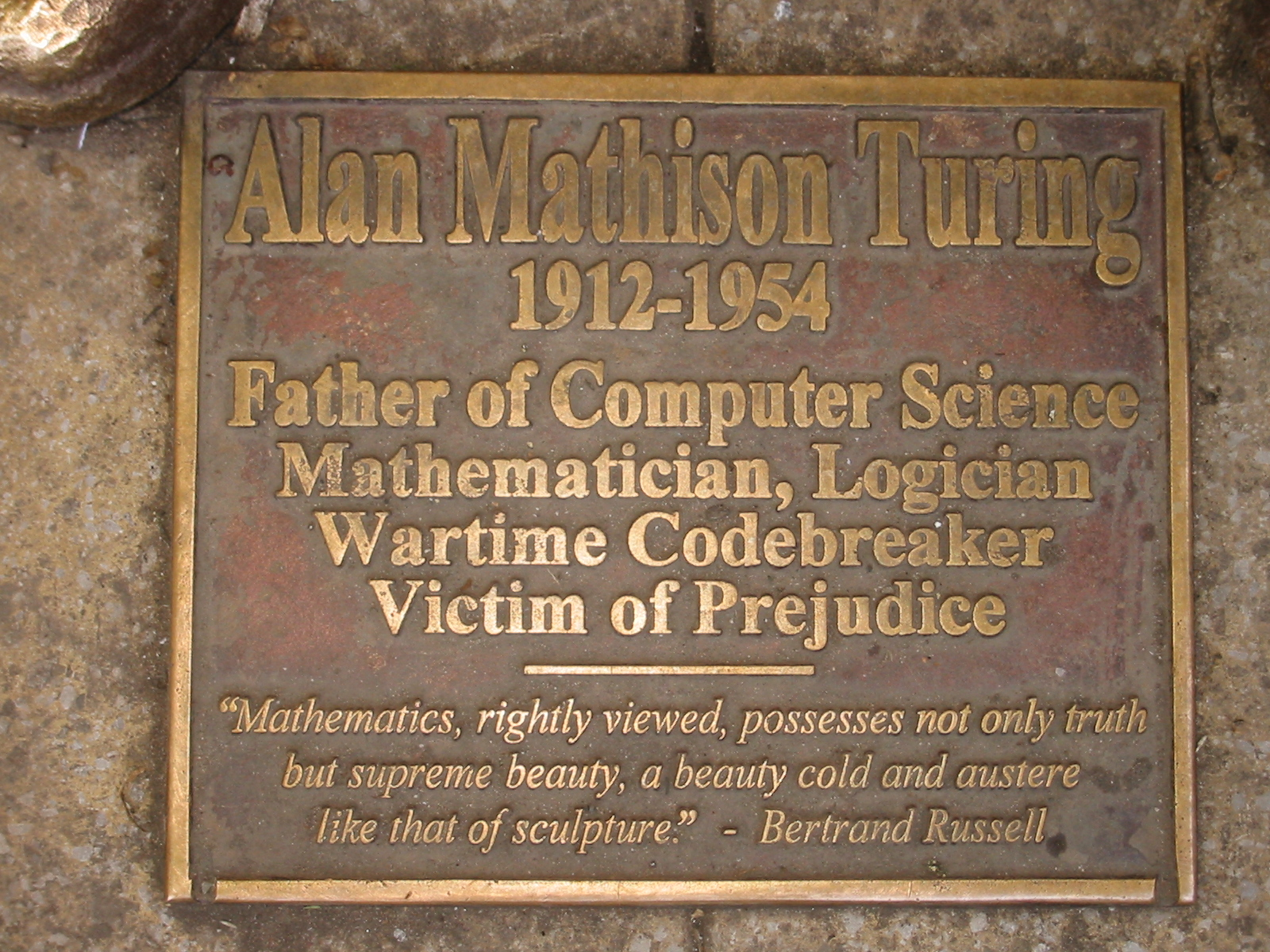
Alan Turing Memorial plaque

The inscription in relief on the cast bronze bench reads "Alan Mathison Turing 1912–1954" and IEKYF ROMSI ADXUO KVKZC GUBJ. The latter is described by Hughes as "a motto as encoded by the German 'Enigma'". The original message is often given as founder of computer science, however this is unlikely as the Enigma ciphering system does not allow a letter to be enciphered to itself, while the fourteenth letter of that message (the "U" in "computer") is the same as the fourteenth letter of the encoded inscription.

A planning application held by Manchester Archives and Local Studies contains two additional codes that were seemingly intended to be included in the memorial: MBJSU UEZGQ VKMXC AFROI HHKYD which decodes to pioneer of digital computing and also LJYDN VCDTO BAWQL PURCX IZNVE which was intended to be on the plaque by Turing's feet.

A plaque at the statue's feet reads "Father of Computer Science, Mathematician, Logician, Wartime Codebreaker, Victim of Prejudice", followed by the Bertrand Russell quotation "Mathematics, rightly viewed, possesses not only truth but supreme beauty, a beauty cold and austere like that of sculpture." Hughes buried his own old Amstrad computer beneath the statue, in tribute to Turing.

== Gallery ==
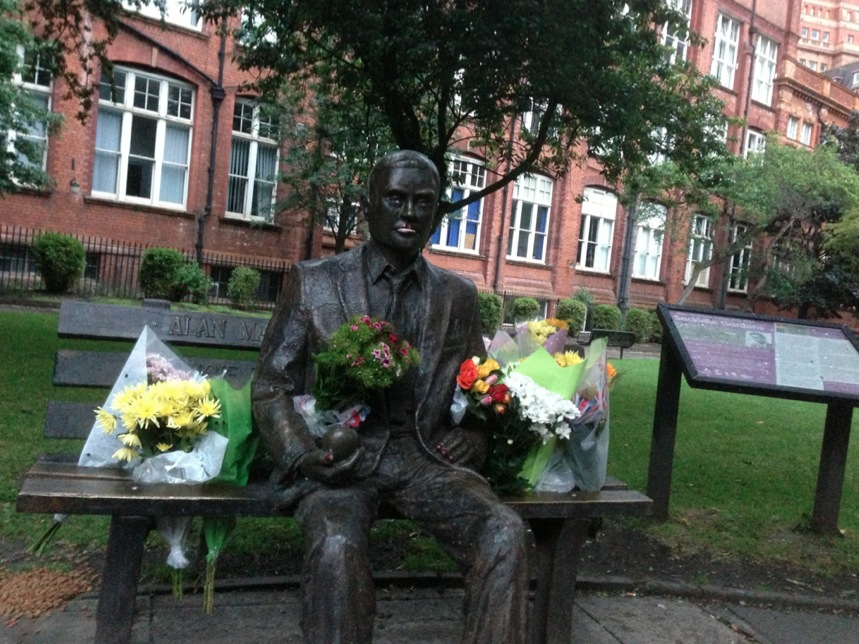
Flowers on the Alan Turing Memorial, 2012.

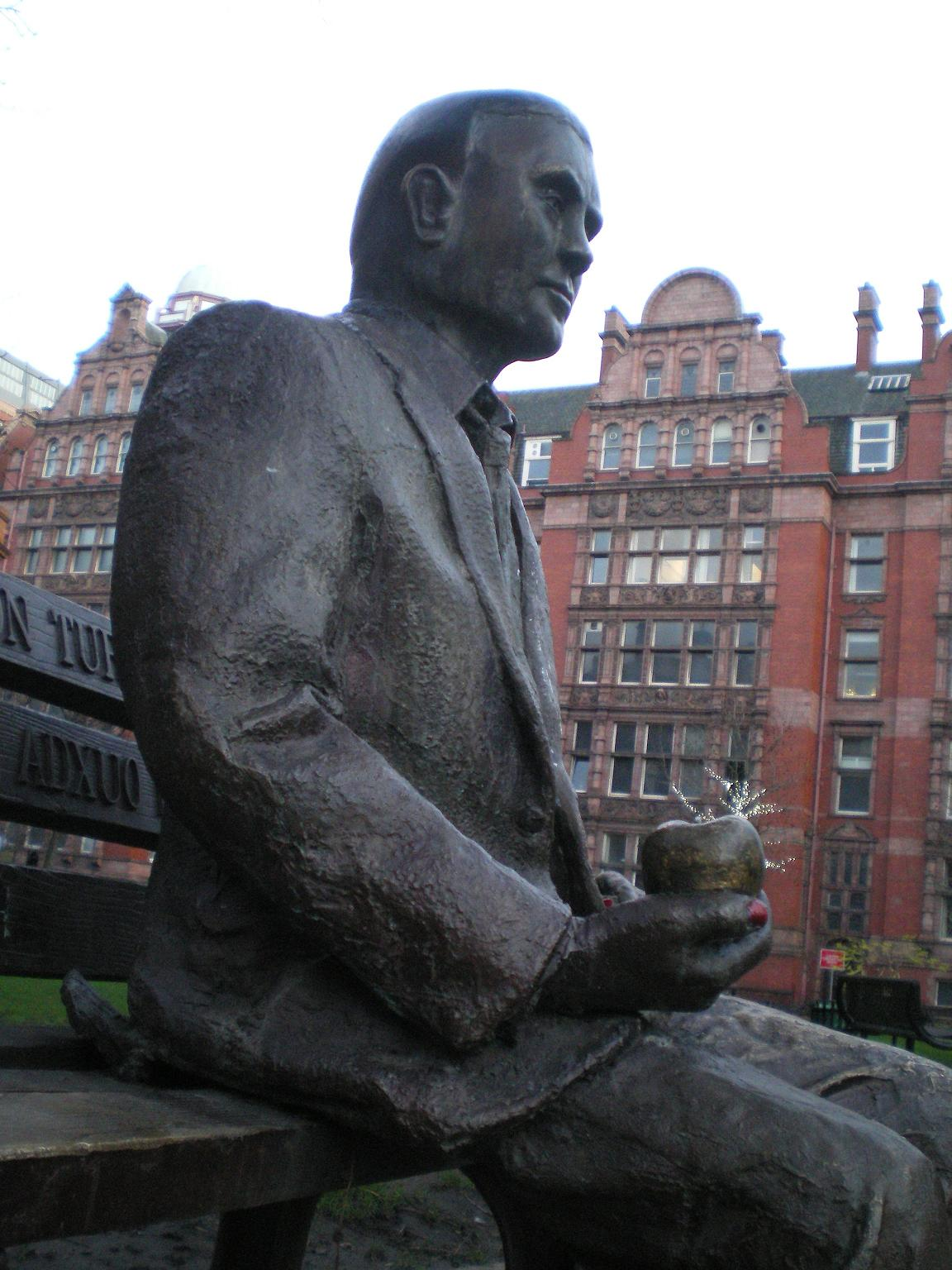
Alan Turing Memorial close-up, showing the apple he holds.

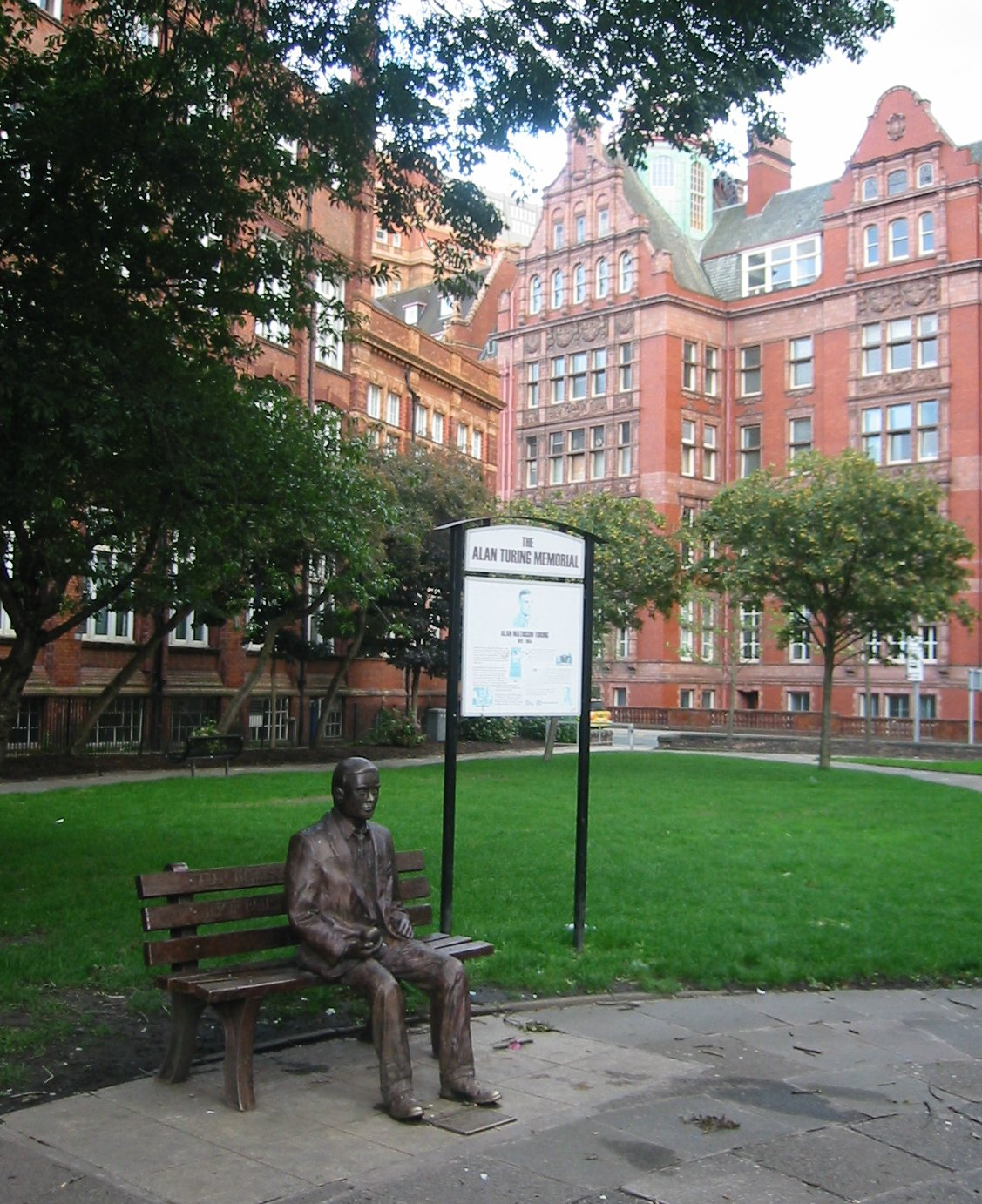
Alan Turing Memorial with the Engineering and Physical Sciences faculty office of the University of Manchester in the background.

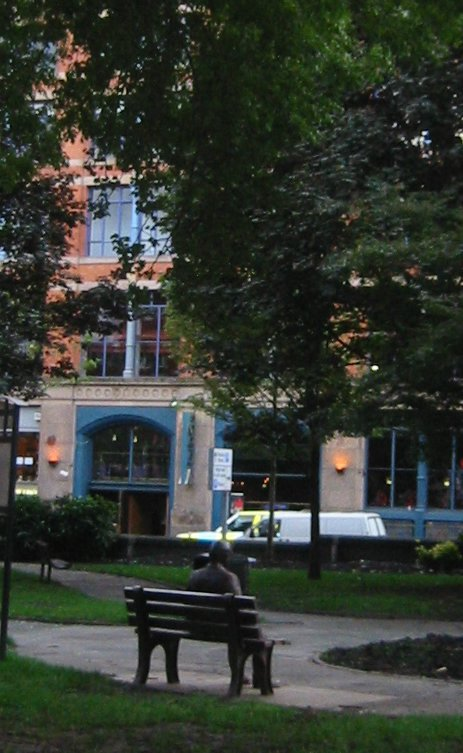
Alan Turing Memorial looking at Sackville Street.

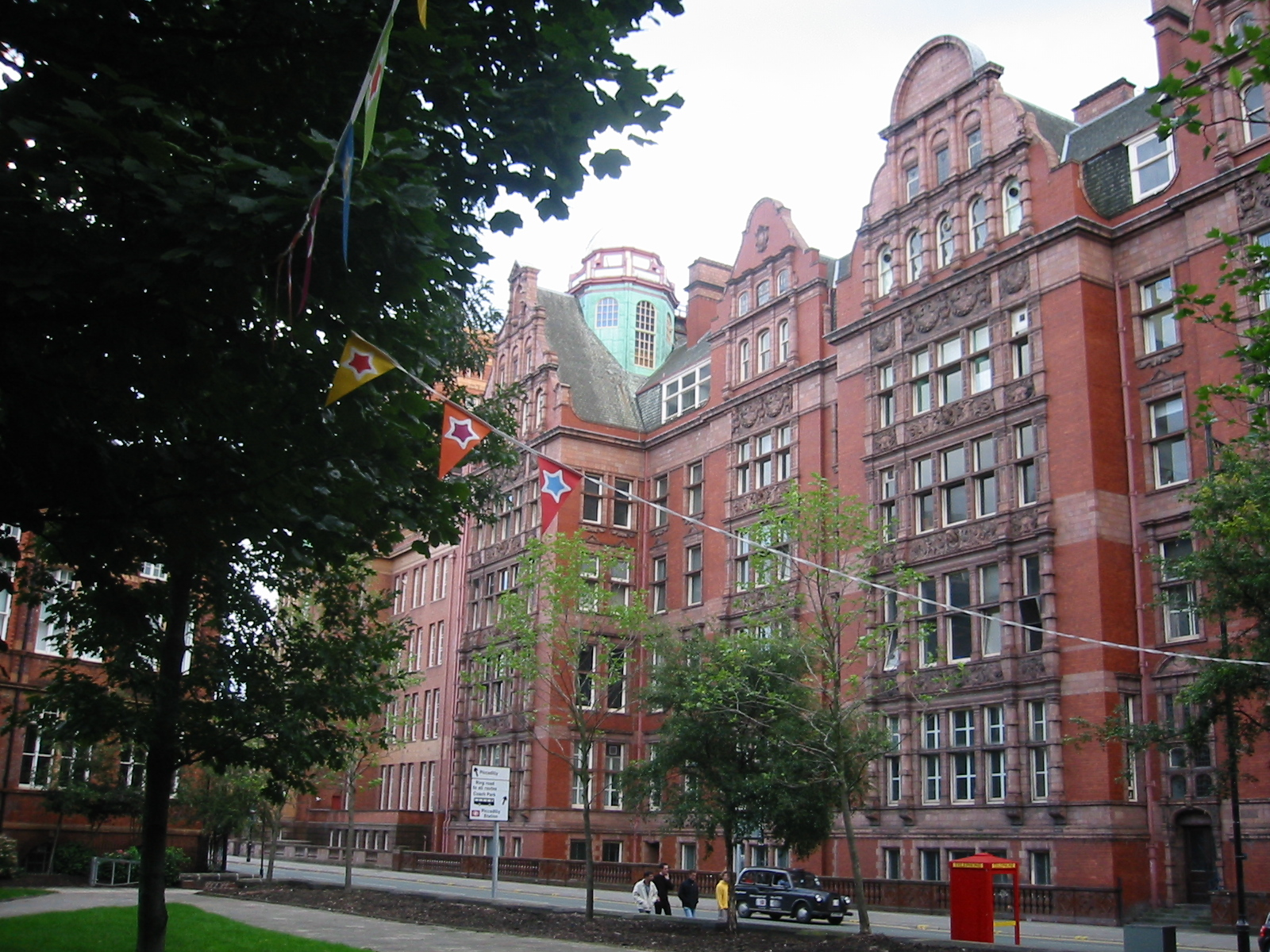
Sackville Park looking toward the Sackville Street Building, University of Manchester.

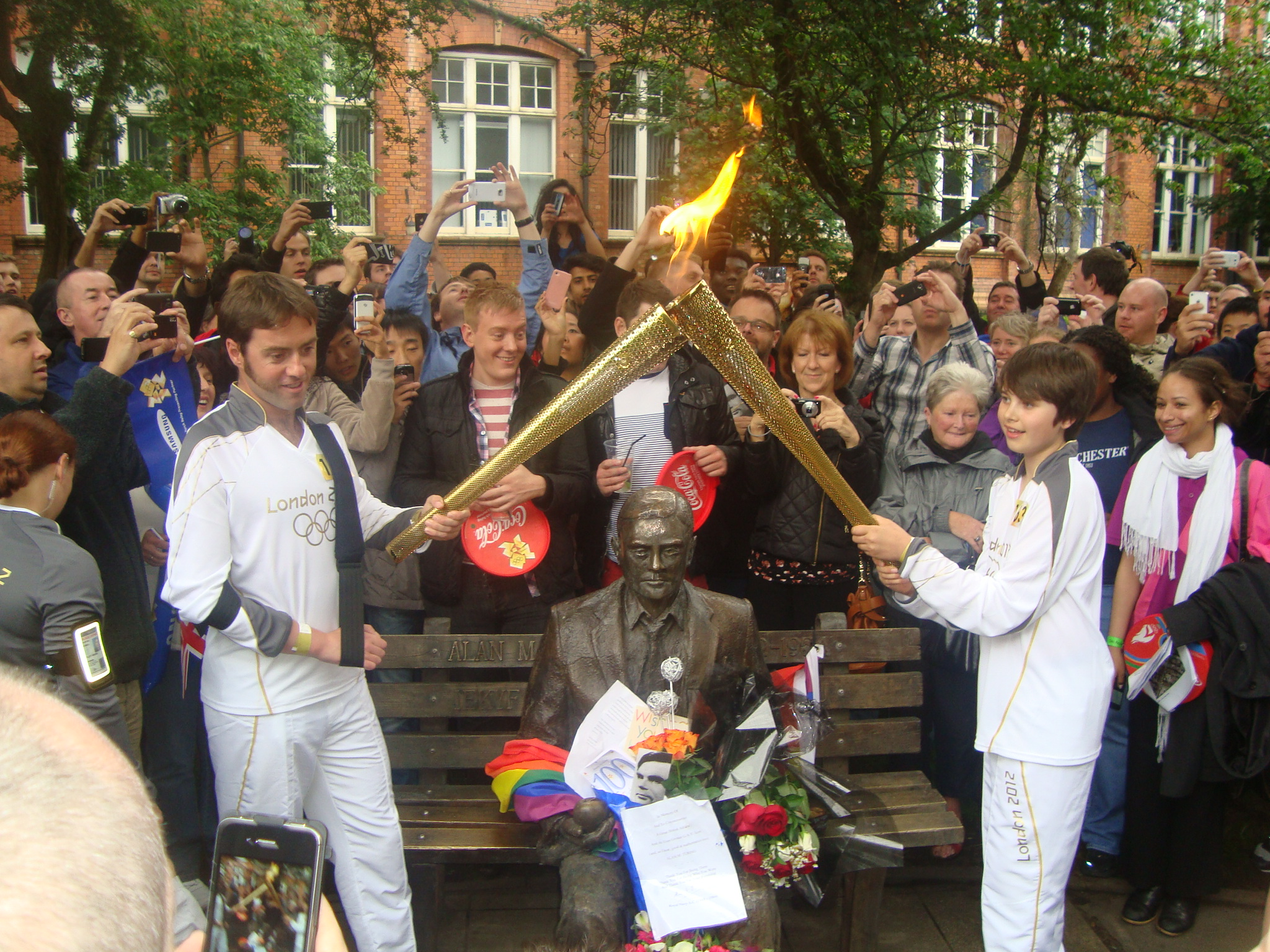
The London 2012 Olympic Torch stopped off at Turing's statue in Manchester on his 100th birthday.

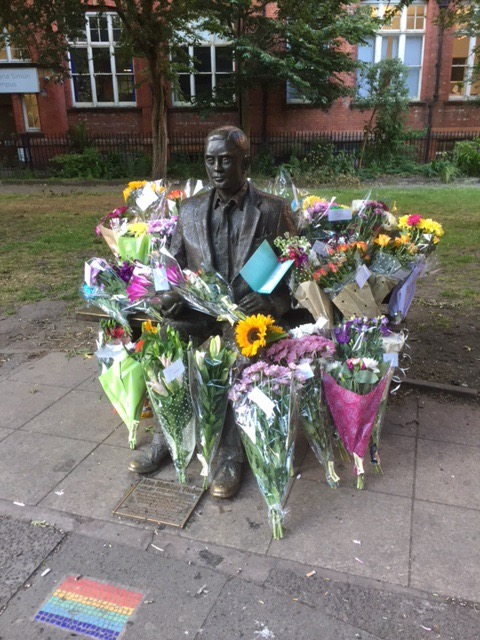
Flowers at the statue in 2018, the day before Turing's 106th birthday.

== See also ==
- 2001 in art
- Statue of Alan Turing, Bletchley Park (2007)
- Alan Turing sculpture (1988), Eugene, Oregon
- List of LGBTQ monuments and memorials
