= 1989 in art =

Events from the year 1989 in art.

== Events ==
- 30 May – Tiananmen Square protests of 1989: The sculpture Goddess of Democracy (由女神, zìyóu nǚshén), constructed by students of the China Central Academy of Fine Arts from extruded polystyrene foam, is unveiled by protestors in Tiananmen Square, Beijing. Early on 4 June it is toppled by a tank.
- 12 June – The Corcoran Gallery of Art in Washington, D.C. cancels Robert Mapplethorpe's photography exhibition, "Robert Mapplethorpe: The Perfect Moment", because of its sexually explicit content.
- October – The Philip and Muriel Berman Museum of Art opens at Ursinus College in Collegeville, Pennsylvania, United States.
- December – Restoration of the Sistine Chapel frescoes: Completion of restoration work on Michelangelo's Sistine Chapel ceiling in the Vatican.
- Bill Gates founds Corbis Corporation as Interactive Home Systems to license rights to visual media for digital display.
- The Keith Haring Foundation is established.
- Magiciens de la Terre exhibition opens at the Centre Georges Pompidou and the Grande Halle at the Parc de la Villette.
- The Other Story, the first retrospective exhibition of British African, Caribbean, and Asian modernism, opens at the Hayward Gallery in London.

== Awards ==
- Archibald Prize: Bryan Westwood – Portrait of Elwyn Lynn
- John Moores Painting Prize – Lisa Milroy for "Handles"

== Exhibitions ==
- Jim Dine Drawings 1973–1987 at Minneapolis Institute of Art
- Robert Longo retrospective at Los Angeles County Museum of Art
- Magiciens de la terre at Centre Georges Pompidou

== Works ==
- Yaacov Agam – Visual Music Orchestration
- Wayne Chabre (Eugene, Oregon)
  - Marie Curie Gargoyle
  - Maxwell & Demon Gargoyle
- Robert Coburn – Korean Temple Bell (installation, Portland, Oregon)
- Peter Corlett – Man in the mud (diorama, Australian War Memorial)
- Arturo Di Modica - Charging Bull
- Tom Hardy, Lawrence Halprin, and Scott Stickney – Hatfield Fountain (Salem, Oregon)
- John Keane – The Other Cheek
- Odd Nerdrum – Dawn
- Cornelia Parker – Thirty Pieces of Silver (installation)
- Joel Shapiro - Untitled (sculpture)
- William Woodward - The Greatest Show on Earth, Circus Museum and the Tibbals Learning Center at the John and Mable Ringling Museum of Art, Sarasota, Florida

== Births ==
- 7 November – Nadezhda Tolokonnikova, Russian conceptual artist and political activist.

== Deaths ==
=== January to June ===
- 23 January – Salvador Dalí, Spanish surrealist artist (b. 1904)
- 1 February – Elaine de Kooning, American abstract expressionist painter (b. 1918)
- 9 February – Osamu Tezuka, Japanese manga artist, animator and producer (b. 1928)
- 17 February – Guy Laroche, French fashion designer (b. 1921)
- 24 February – Mallica Reynolds ("Kapo"), Jamaican painter, sculptor and religious leader (b. 1911)
- 9 March – Robert Mapplethorpe, American photographer (b. 1946)
- 31 March – Piotr Belousov, Russian painter and graphic artist (b. 1912)
- 6 April – Henri Cadiou, French realist painter and lithographer (b. 1906)
- 4 June
  - Dik Browne, American cartoonist (b. 1917)
  - Cecil Collins, English painter and printmaker (b. 1908)
- 9 June – Piotr Vasiliev, Russian painter (b. 1909)

=== July to December ===
- 5 July – Berthold Wolpe, German-born British printmaker and typeface designer (b. 1905)
- 10 August – Pierre Matisse, gallerist, son of Henri Matisse (b. 1900)
- 29 August – Sir Peter Scott, English ornithologist, conservationist and wildlife painter (b. 1909)
- 24 October – Doris Huestis Speirs, Canadian painter, ornithologist and poet (b. 1894)
- 11 November – Jay DeFeo, American visual artist (b. 1929)
- 12 November – Božidar Jakac, Slovene painter and graphic artist (b. 1899)
- 21 November – Edward Bawden, English artist and illustrator (b. 1903)
- 22 November – C. C. Beck, American cartoonist and comic book artist (b. 1910)
- 21 December – Rotimi Fani-Kayode, Nigerian-English photographer, co-founder of Autograph ABP (b. 1955)
- 28 December – William Scott, Ulster Scots painter (b. 1913)
- 31 December – Lilly Daché, French milliner and fashion designer (b. 1898)
- date unknown
  - Francesco Di Cocco, Italian painter (b. 1900)

== See also ==
- 1989 in Fine Arts of the Soviet Union
