= Bear Gargoyle =

Sculpture in Eugene, Oregon, U.S.

- The sculpture in 2015
- Artist: Wayne Chabre
- Year: 1998
- Type: Sculpture
- Subject: Grizzly bear
- Dimensions: 1.7 m × 1.2 m × 1.5 m (5.5 ft × 4 ft × 5 ft)
- Condition: "Treatment needed" (1993)
- Location: Eugene, Oregon, United States; 44.04309°N 123.06846°W
- Owner: University of Oregon

Bear Gargoyle is an outdoor 1988 sculpture by Wayne Chabre, installed at the University of Oregon Museum of Natural and Cultural History in Eugene, Oregon, United States. It depicts the head of a grizzly bear with a Kwakwaka'wakw (Kwakiutl Indian) bear mask on top. The sculpture is made of hammered 32 oz. copper over a stainless steel frame and measures approximately 5.5 feet (1.7 m) x 4 feet (1.2 m) x 5 feet (1.5 m). Its condition was deemed "treatment needed" by the Smithsonian Institution's "Save Outdoor Sculpture!" program in March 1993. The sculpture is administered by the University of Oregon.

== See also ==
- 1998 in art
- Kwakwaka'wakw art
