= Thomas Condon =

Irish teacher, minister, and geologist

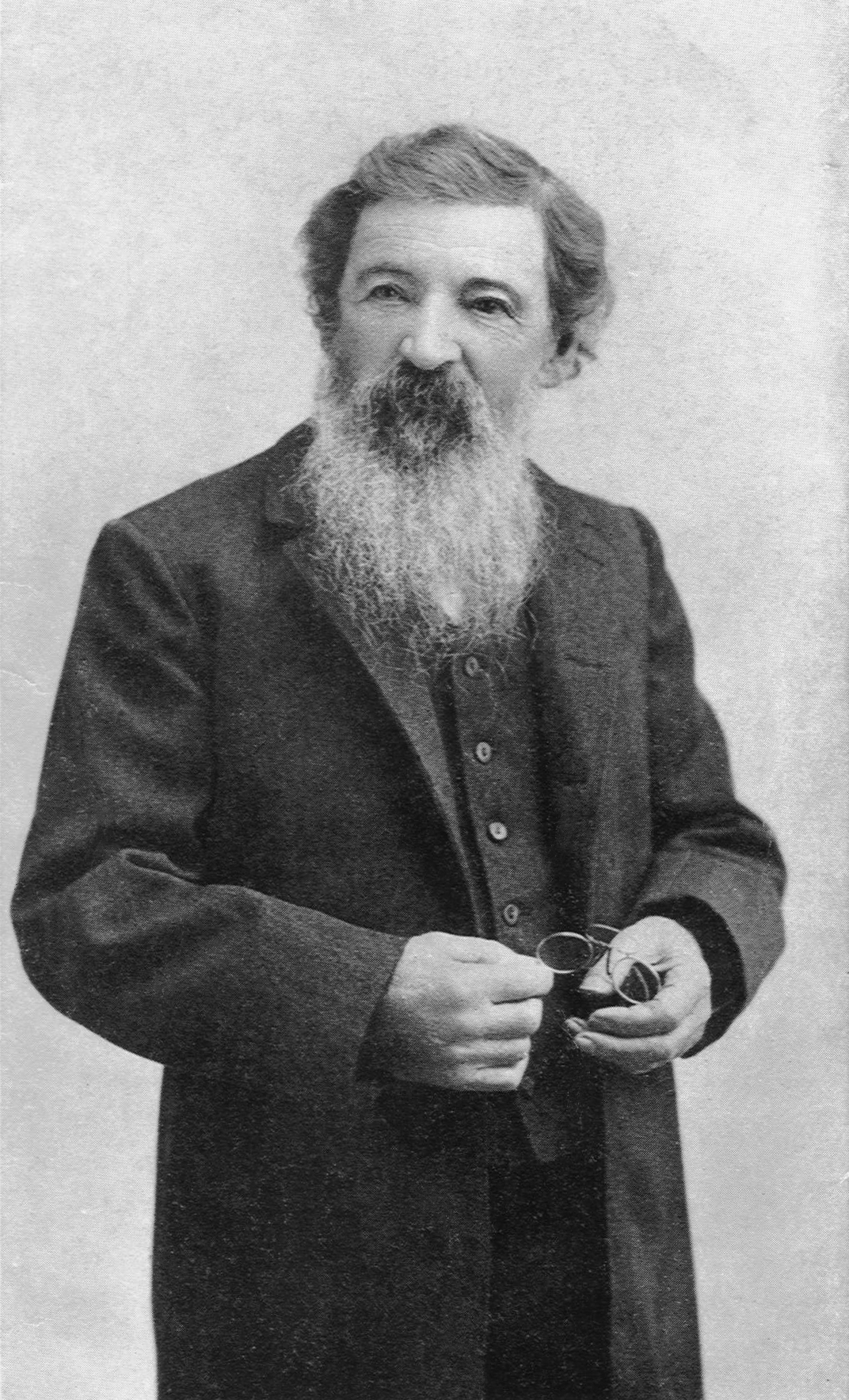
- Thomas Condon at age 80
- Born: 1822; Ballynafauna, near Fermoy, Ireland
- Died: 1907 (aged 84–85) near Eugene, Oregon, U.S.
- Resting place: Eugene Masonic Cemetery
- Citizenship: United States
- Education: Auburn Theological Seminary
- Occupations: teacher, minister, geologist
- Spouse: Cornelia Holt
- Children: 10

Thomas Condon (1822–1907) was an Irish Congregational minister, geologist, and paleontologist who gained recognition for his work in the U.S. state of Oregon.

== Life and career ==
Condon arrived in New York City from Ireland in 1833 and graduated from theological seminary in 1852, after which he traveled to Oregon by ship. As a minister at The Dalles, he became interested in the fossils he found in the area. He found fossil seashells on the Crooked River and fossil camels and other animals along the John Day River. Many of his discoveries were in the present-day John Day Fossil Beds National Monument. He corresponded with noted scientists, including Spencer Baird of the Smithsonian, Edward Cope of the Academy of Natural Sciences, Joseph Leidy, O.C. Marsh, and John C. Merriam, and provided specimens to major museums.

Condon was appointed the first State Geologist for Oregon in 1872. He resigned that post to become first professor of geology at the University of Oregon. Previously he was a teacher at Pacific University in Forest Grove.

In The Two Islands and What Came of Them, a geology book published in 1902, Condon wrote about two widely separated regions of Oregon that contain its oldest rocks, the Klamath Mountains in the southwestern part of the state and the Blue Mountains in the northeast. The book attempted to summarize what was then known about the state's geology and to draw conclusions about its geologic past.

Condon was an advocate of theistic evolution. He has been described as a "Christian Darwinist".

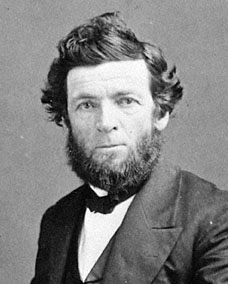
Thomas Condon in the 1870s

== Legacy ==
Condon Hall at the University of Oregon, which originally housed the geology department, was named for Condon, as were the Thomas Condon Paleontology Center at the Sheep Rock unit of the John Day Fossil Beds National Monument, near Kimberly, Oregon, temporary Lake Condon, formed periodically by the Missoula Floods, and the Condon Fossil Collection of the University of Oregon Museum of Natural and Cultural History, which was founded by Condon in 1876. Condon Elementary School (1950–1983) in Eugene still stands as the University of Oregon's Agate Hall. He is the namesake of Condon Butte in Lane County. Condon, Oregon, was named for Harvey C. Condon, a nephew of Thomas Condon.

Anser condoni is a synonym for the fossil swan Cygnus paloregonus.

== See also ==
- Thomas Condon: Portrait of Condon (1989)

== Works cited ==
- Clark, Robert D. The Odyssey of Thomas Condon (1989). Portland, Oregon: The Oregon Historical Society Press. ISBN 0-87595-200-3.
