= Raven Gargoyle =

Sculpture in Eugene, Oregon, U.S.

- The sculpture in October 2015
- Artist: Wayne Chabre
- Year: 1987
- Type: Sculpture
- Medium: Copper; stainless steel
- Subject: Raven
- Dimensions: 1.2 m × 0.91 m × 1.2 m (4 ft × 3 ft × 4 ft)
- Condition: "Treatment needed" (1993)
- Location: Eugene, Oregon, United States; 44.04282°N 123.06846°W
- Owner: University of Oregon

Raven Gargoyle is an outdoor 1987 sculpture by Wayne Chabre, installed in 1988 on the University of Oregon campus in Eugene, Oregon, in the United States. The hammered copper head of a raven with a Kwakiutl Indian mask, built on a stainless steel frame, measures approximately 4 feet (1.2 m) x 3 feet (0.91 m) x 4 feet (1.2 m). It was surveyed and deemed "treatment needed" by the Smithsonian Institution's "Save Outdoor Sculpture!" program in March 1993. The sculpture is administered by the University of Oregon.

== See also ==
- 1987 in art
- Cultural depictions of ravens
- Raven Tales
