= Statue of Alan Turing, Bletchley Park =

2007 artwork by Stephen Kettle in England

Statue of Alan Turing
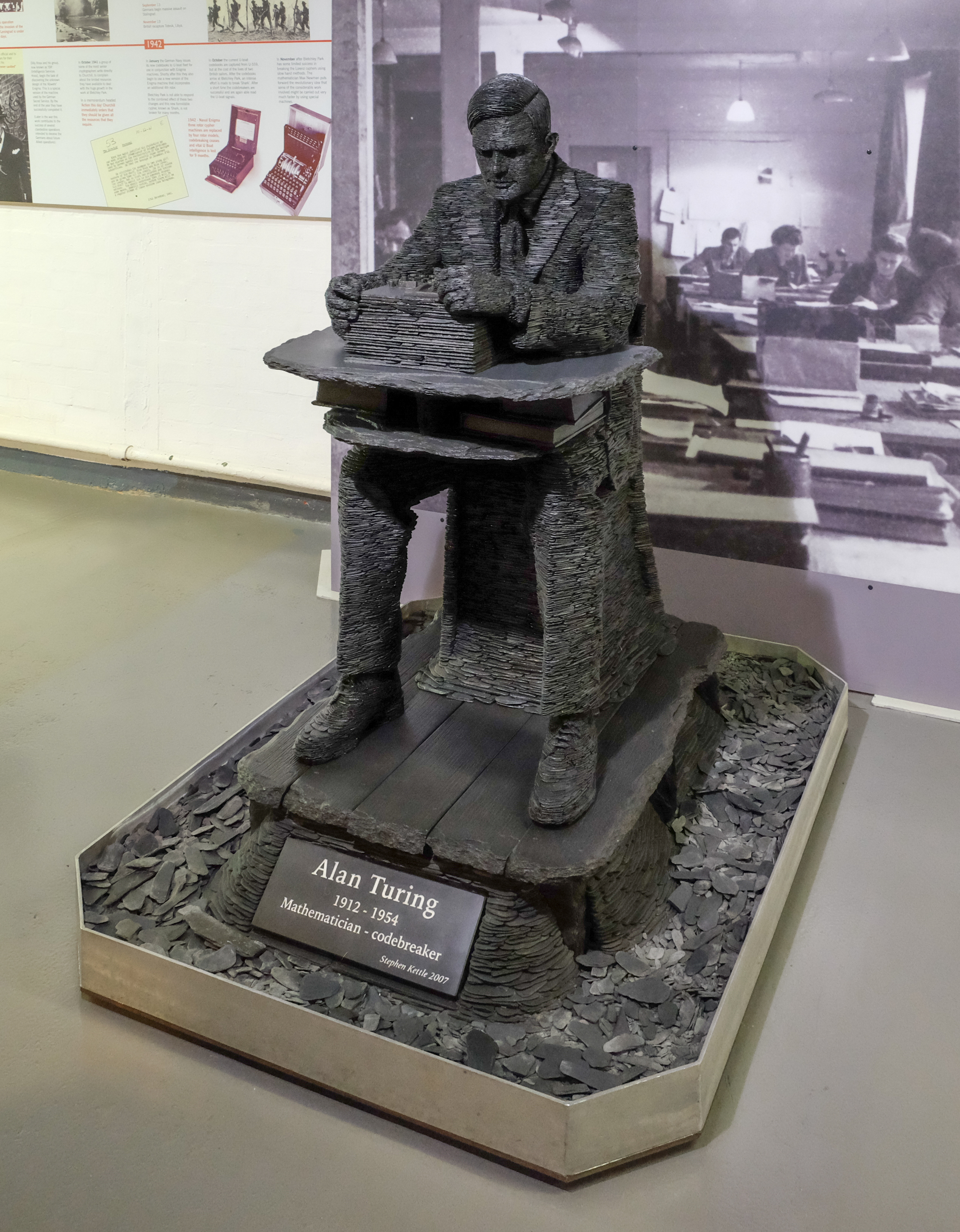
- View of the statue on exhibit at Bletchley Park
- Artist: Stephen Kettle
- Year: 2007
- Type: Sculpture
- Medium: Slate
- Subject: Alan Turing
- Location: Bletchley Park, Bletchley, Milton Keynes, England; 51.998389°N 0.740887°W
- Owner: Bletchley Park Trust (commissioned by Sidney Frank)
- Accession: 2007
- Website: www.stephenkettle.co.uk/turing.html

A statue of Alan Turing, created in slate by Stephen Kettle in 2007, is located at Bletchley Park in Milton Keynes, England, as part of an exhibition that honours Turing (1912–1954). It was commissioned by the American businessman and philanthropist Sidney Frank (1919–2006).

The slate for the sculpture was selected from North Wales because the sculptor learned that Turing used to holiday there as a child and adult. The slate originated from Llechwedd, near Blaenau Ffestiniog. Turing is depicted seated and looking at a German Enigma machine. He is dressed in a jacket, but there is some deliberate untidiness in his clothing.

In 2007, it was commented that the statue acknowledges Turing as a codebreaker but not as a gay icon. The statue became part of a new exhibition at Bletchley Park on Alan Turing in 2012, the centenary year of Turing's birth. Sir John Dermot Turing, nephew of Alan Turing, attended the opening of the exhibition and posed with the statue.

== See also ==
- 2007 in art
- Alan Turing Memorial (2001), Manchester
- List of LGBT monuments and memorials
