= Deschutes Hall =

Building on the University of Oregon campus

Coordinates: 44.046001°N 123.071112°W

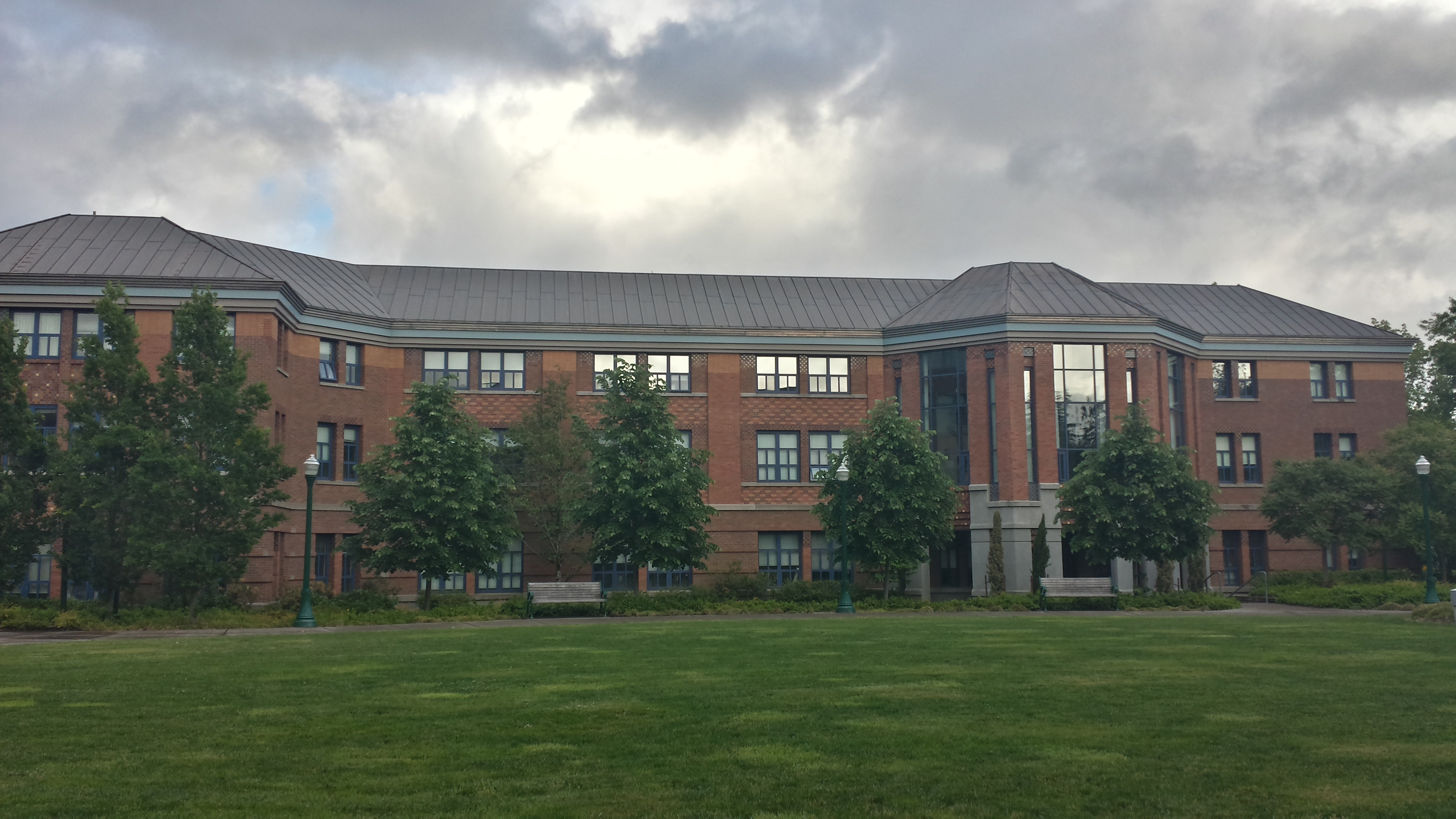
The front of Deschutes Hall

Deschutes Hall is a building on the University of Oregon campus in Eugene, Oregon. Opened in the Winter term of 1990, it is home to the university's Computer Science department. The four-story building contains faculty and graduate student offices, boardrooms, and research laboratories.

As part of the Lorry I. Lokey Science Complex, it connects directly to the Lewis Integrative Science Building. Deschutes Hall takes a name given by French-Canadian trappers to the Deschutes River, important to Native American livelihood.

== Images ==
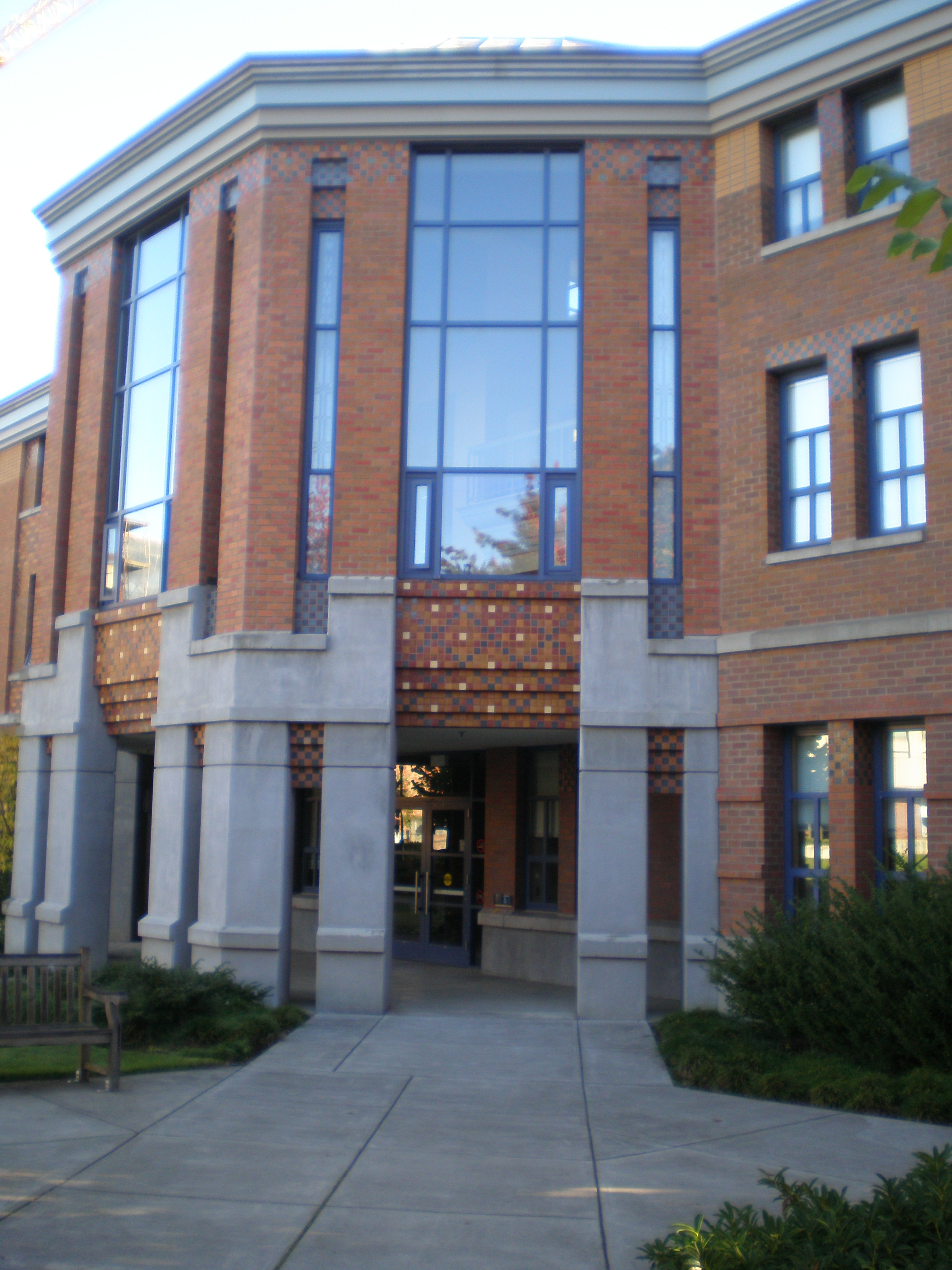
A closer view of the entrance.

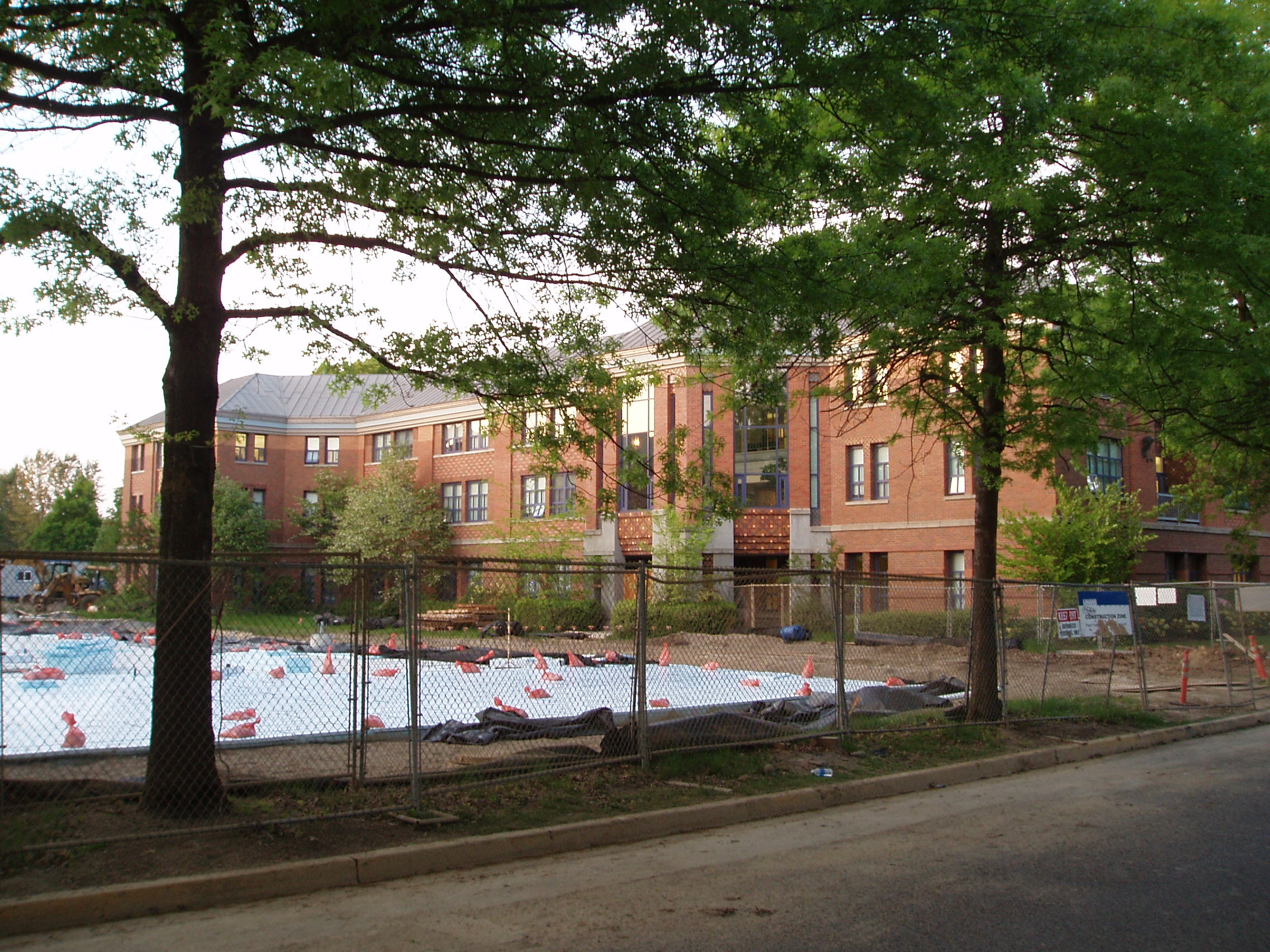
Facing 13th Avenue during a 2007 campus renovation.

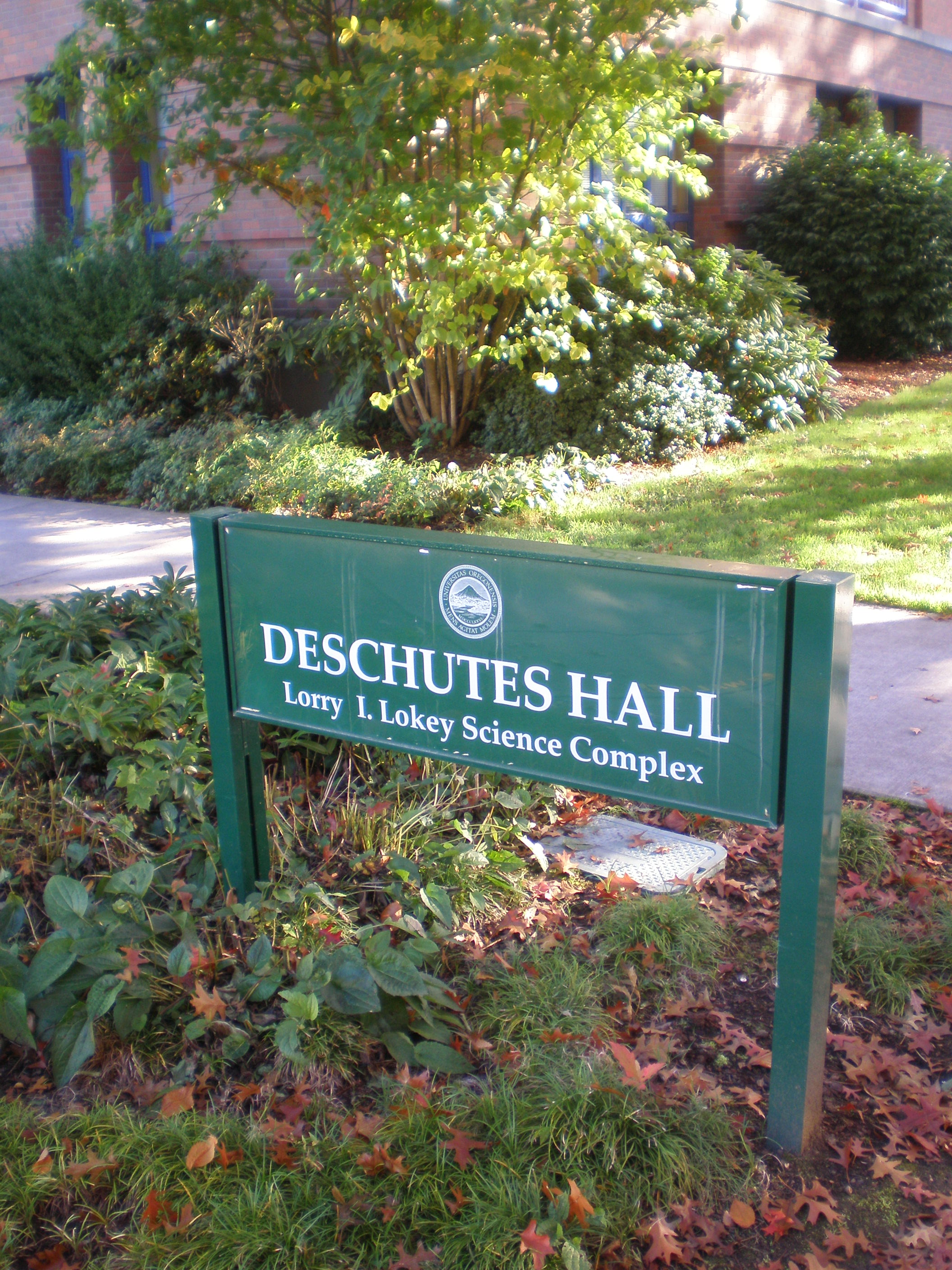
Sign near the back entrance.

== See also ==
- University of Oregon campus
