= Alan Turing (sculpture) =

1988 sculpture of Alan Turing

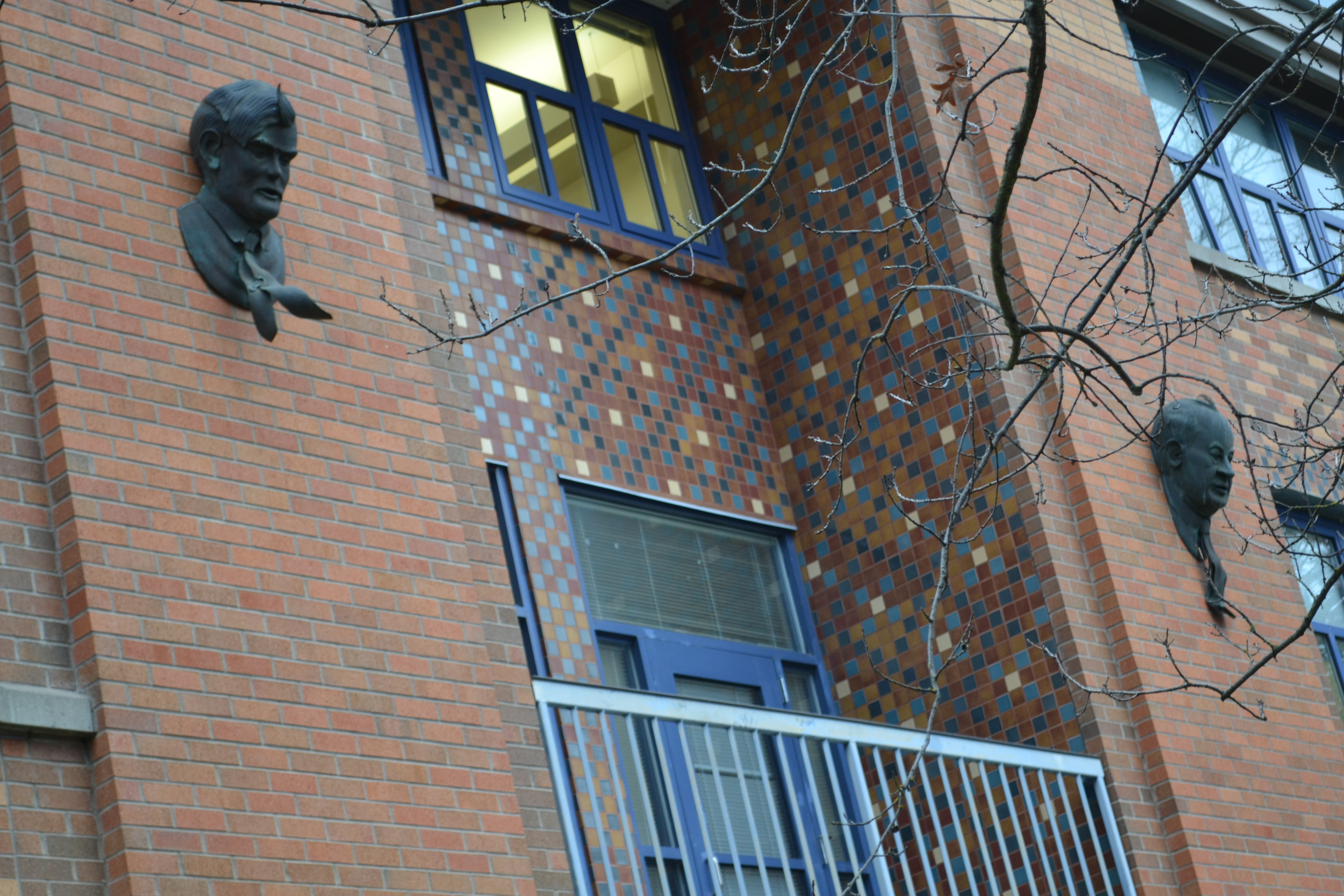
- The sculpture (left) and John von Neumann (1987), attached to Deschutes Hall in 2011
- Artist: Wayne Chabre
- Year: 1988
- Type: Sculpture
- Medium: Hammered copper sheet
- Subject: Alan Turing
- Dimensions: 0.91 m × 0.46 m × 0.46 m (3 ft × 1.5 ft × 1.5 ft)
- Condition: Undetermined (1993)
- Location: Eugene, Oregon, United States; 44.04566°N 123.07111°W

Alan Turing, sometimes spelled Allen Turing and also known as Allen Turing Gargoyle, is an outdoor 1988 hammered copper sheet sculpture of Alan Turing by Wayne Chabre. It is installed on the exterior of Deschutes Hall on the University of Oregon campus in Eugene, Oregon, in the United States.

The portrait face in high relief measures approximately 3 feet (0.91 m) × 1.5 feet (0.46 m) × 1.5 feet (0.46 m) and cost $2,500.

Its condition was undetermined when the Smithsonian Institution surveyed the work as part of its Save Outdoor Sculpture! program in March 1993.

== See also ==
- 1988 in art
- Alan Turing Memorial (2001), Manchester, England
- Statue of Alan Turing (2007), Bletchley Park, England
