= Willamette Hall =

Coordinates: 44.0459°N 123.0728°W

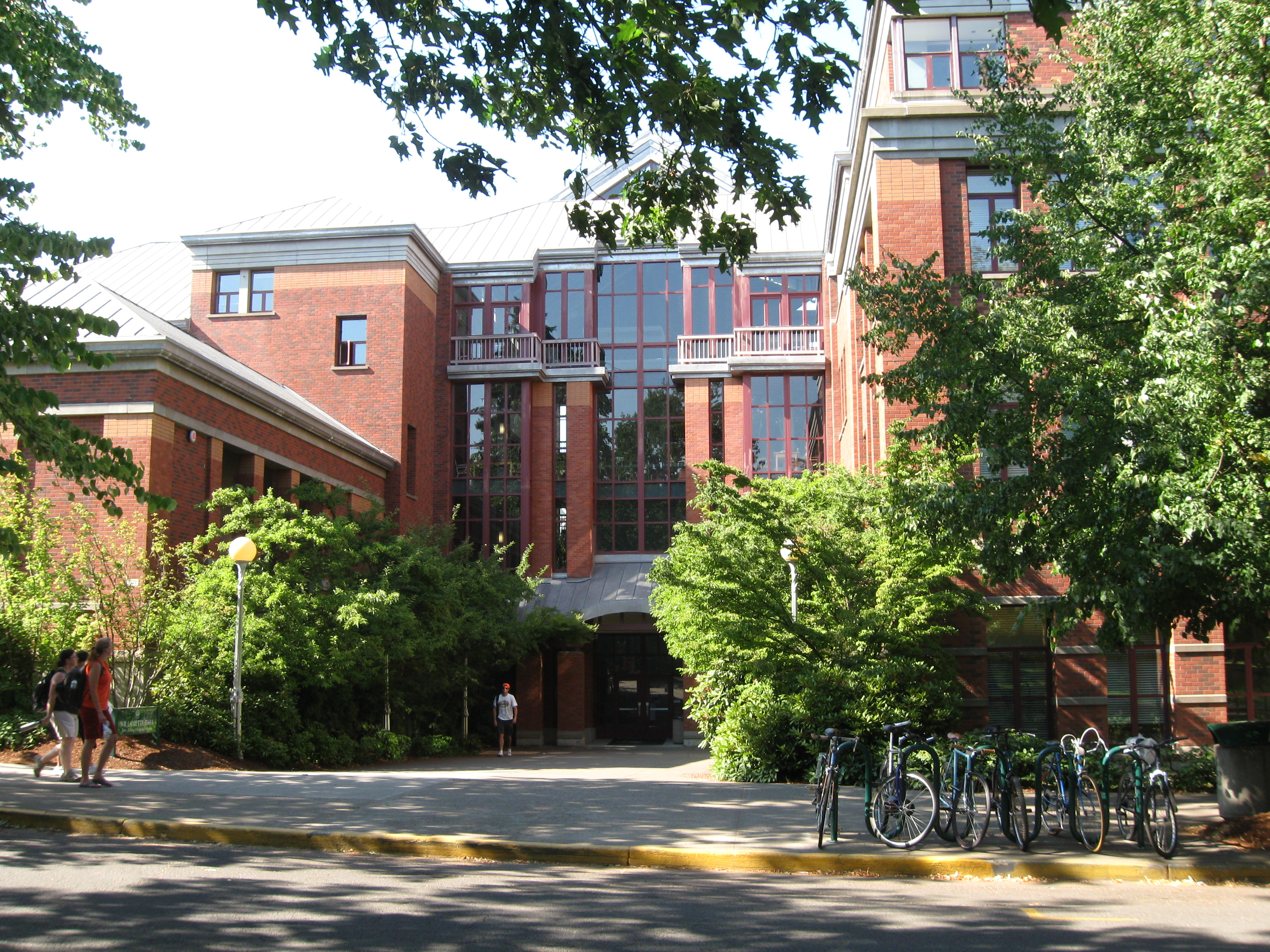
Willamette Hall

Willamette Hall is a building on the University of Oregon campus in Eugene, Oregon. Opened in 1990, it is home to the university's Physics Department. The four-story building contains numerous faculty offices, a 224-seat lecture hall, classrooms, and laboratories. The atrium is named after Paul Olum, former university president and mathematician.

As part of the Lorry I. Lokey Science Complex, it connects directly to Klamath Hall.

== Images ==
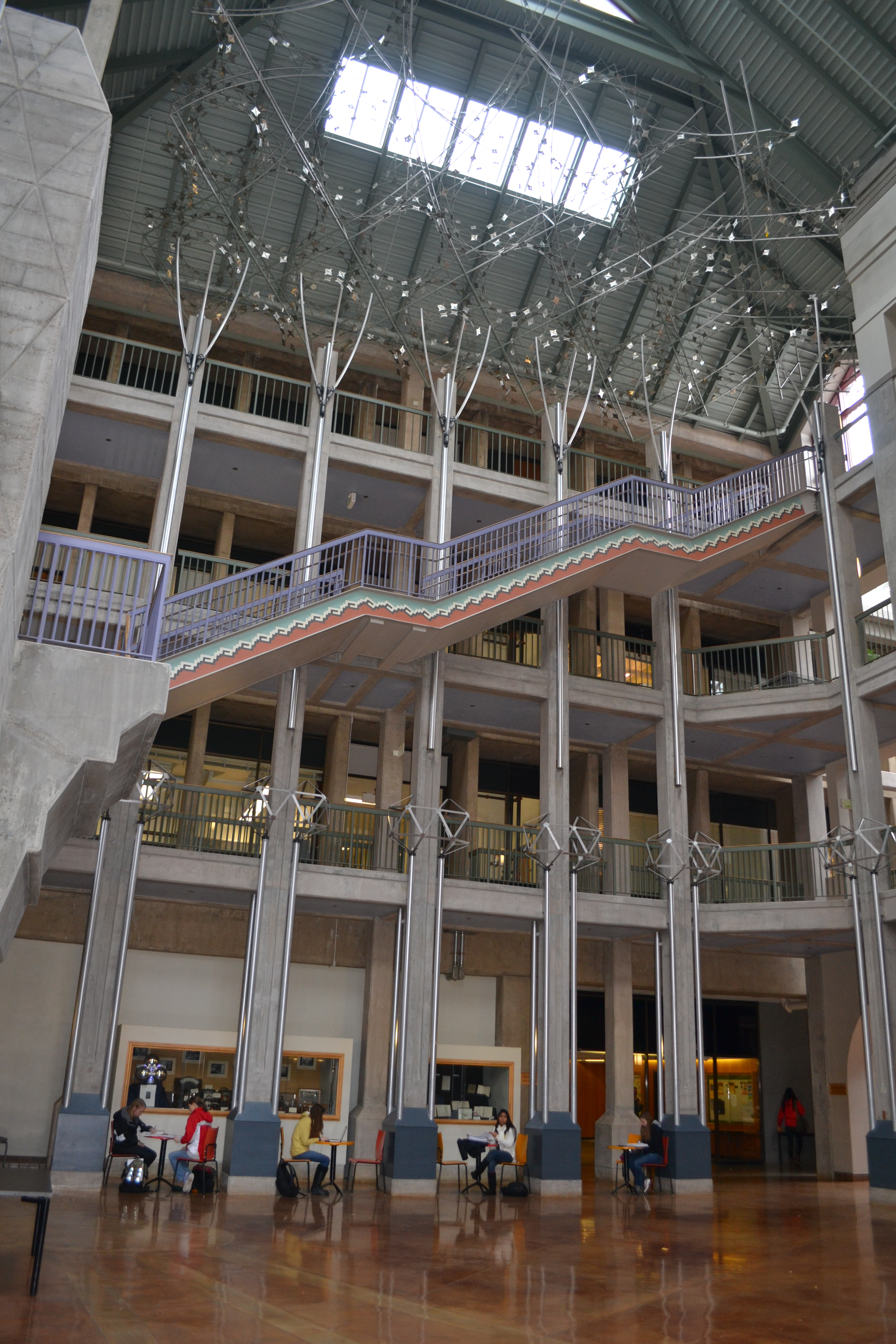
Ground view of the atrium

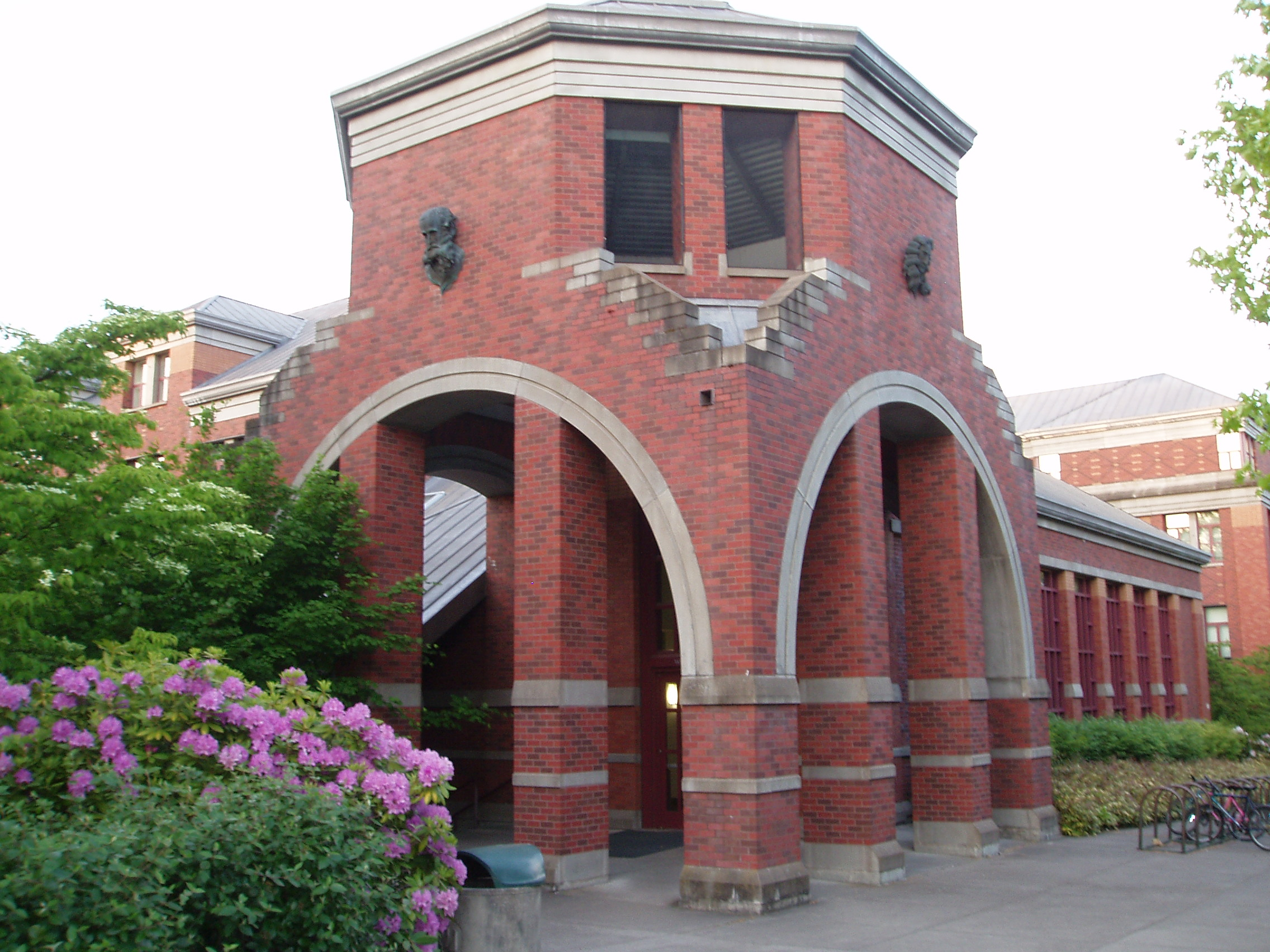
View of the southwest corner of the building

== See also ==
- Alan Turing (sculpture) by Wayne Chabre (1988)
- Einstein Gargoyle by Wayne Chabre (1986)
- John von Neumann (sculpture) by Wayne Chabre (1987)
- Maxwell & Demon Gargoyle by Wayne Chabre (1989)
- University of Oregon College of Arts and Sciences
