= Maxwell & Demon Gargoyle =

Sculpture by Wayne Chabre in Eugene, Oregon, U.S.

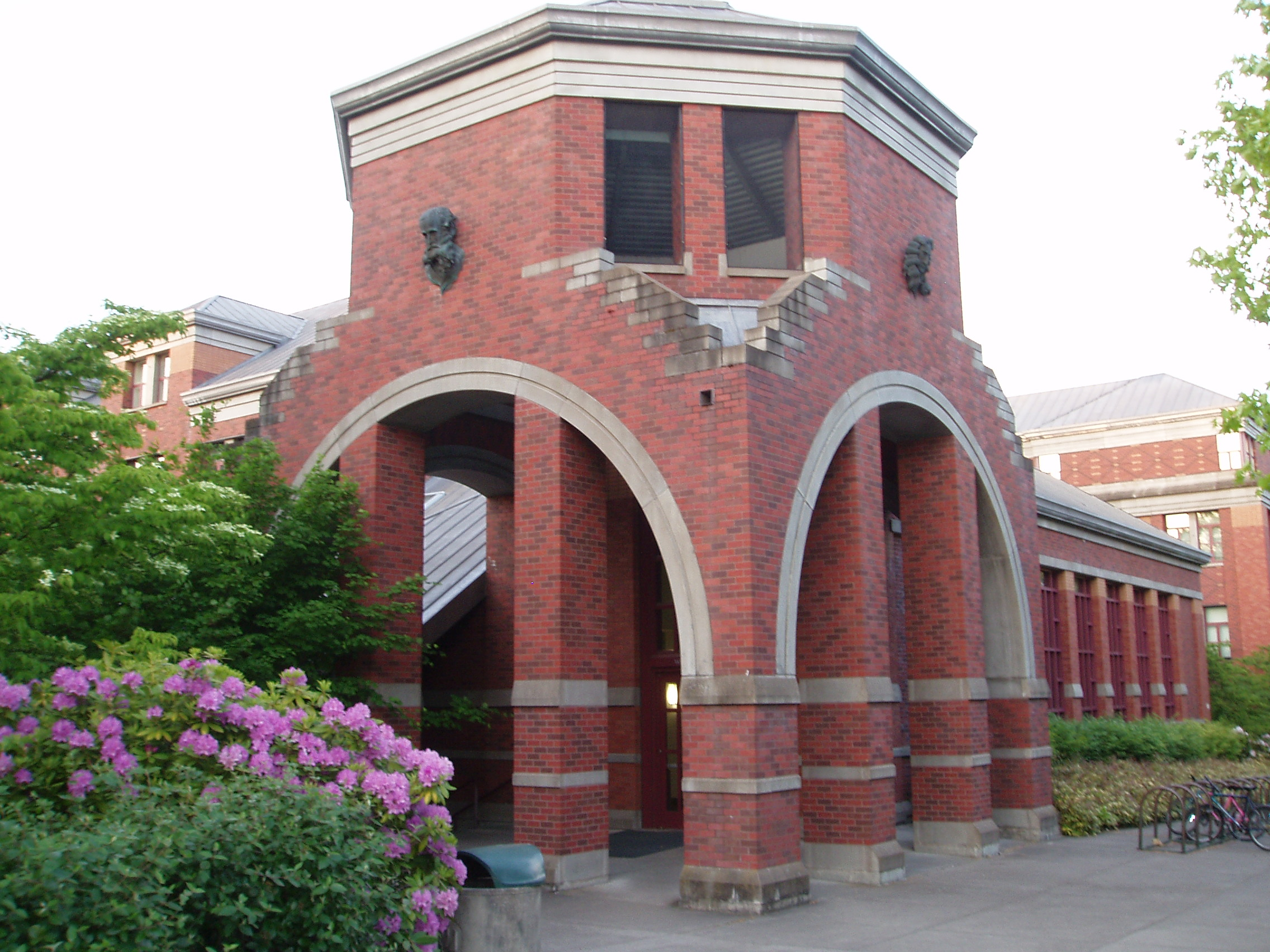
- The sculpture (left) attached to the southwest corner of Willamette Hall in 2007
- Artist: Wayne Chabre
- Year: 1989
- Type: Sculpture
- Medium: Copper
- Subject: James Clerk Maxwell and his "demon"
- Condition: Undetermined (1994)
- Location: Eugene, Oregon, United States; 44.04567°N 123.07331°W
- Owner: University of Oregon

Maxwell & Demon Gargoyle is an outdoor 1989 sculpture by Wayne Chabre, installed in Eugene, Oregon, in the United States. It is a low-relief portrait depicting Scottish physicist James Clerk Maxwell and his "demon", attached to the exterior of Willamette Hall on the University of Oregon campus. The hammered copper sheet sculpture measures approximately 3.15 feet (0.96 m) x 2.5 feet (0.76 m) x 1.5 feet (0.46 m). Its condition was undetermined when the Smithsonian Institution's "Save Outdoor Sculpture!" program surveyed the work in 1994.

== See also ==
- 1989 in art
