= Drosophila Fly Head =

Sculpture in Eugene, Oregon, U.S.

- The sculpture in October 2015
- Artist: Wayne Chabre
- Year: 1988
- Type: Sculpture
- Medium: Copper
- Subject: Fly
- Dimensions: 1.1 m × 0.91 m × 0.76 m (3.5 ft × 3 ft × 2.5 ft)
- Condition: Undetermined (1993)
- Location: Eugene, Oregon, United States; 44.04640°N 123.07217°W
- Owner: University of Oregon

Drosophila Fly Head is an outdoor 1988 sculpture by Wayne Chabre, installed on the University of Oregon campus in Eugene, Oregon, in the United States. The hammered copper sheet high-relief of a fly head measures approximately 3.5 feet (1.1 m) x 3 feet (0.91 m) x 2.5 feet (0.76 m). It was surveyed by the Smithsonian Institution's "Save Outdoor Sculpture!" program in March 1993, though its condition was undetermined. The sculpture is administered by the University of Oregon.

== See also ==
- 1988 in art
