= Marie Curie Gargoyle =

Sculpture by Wayne Chabre in Eugene, Oregon, U.S.

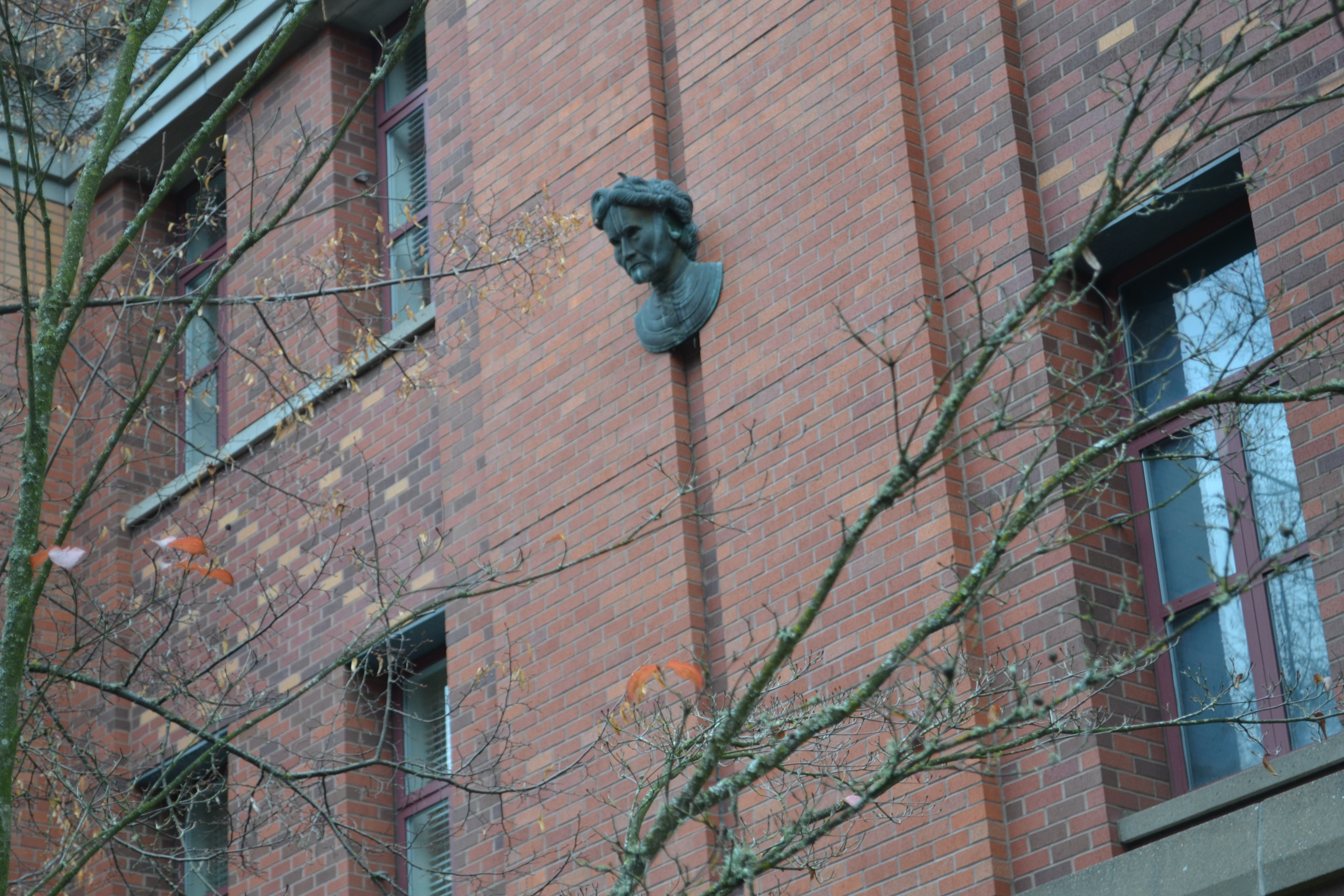
- The sculpture in 2011
- Artist: Wayne Chabre
- Year: 1989
- Type: Sculpture
- Subject: Marie Curie
- Dimensions: 0.76 m × 0.61 m × 0.46 m (2.5 ft × 2 ft × 1.5 ft)
- Condition: Undetermined (1993)
- Location: Eugene, Oregon, United States; 44.04566°N 123.07256°W
- Owner: University of Oregon

Marie Curie Gargoyle is an outdoor 1989 sculpture by Wayne Chabre, installed on the University of Oregon campus in Eugene, Oregon, in the United States. The hammered copper sheet high-relief of Marie Curie measures approximately 2.5 feet (0.76 m) x 2 feet (0.61 m) x 1.5 feet (0.46 m). It was surveyed by the Smithsonian Institution's "Save Outdoor Sculpture!" program in March 1993, though its condition was undetermined. The sculpture is administered by the University of Oregon.

== See also ==
- 1989 in art
