= Einstein Gargoyle =

Portrait bust of Albert Einstein by Wayne Chabre in Eugene, Oregon, U.S.

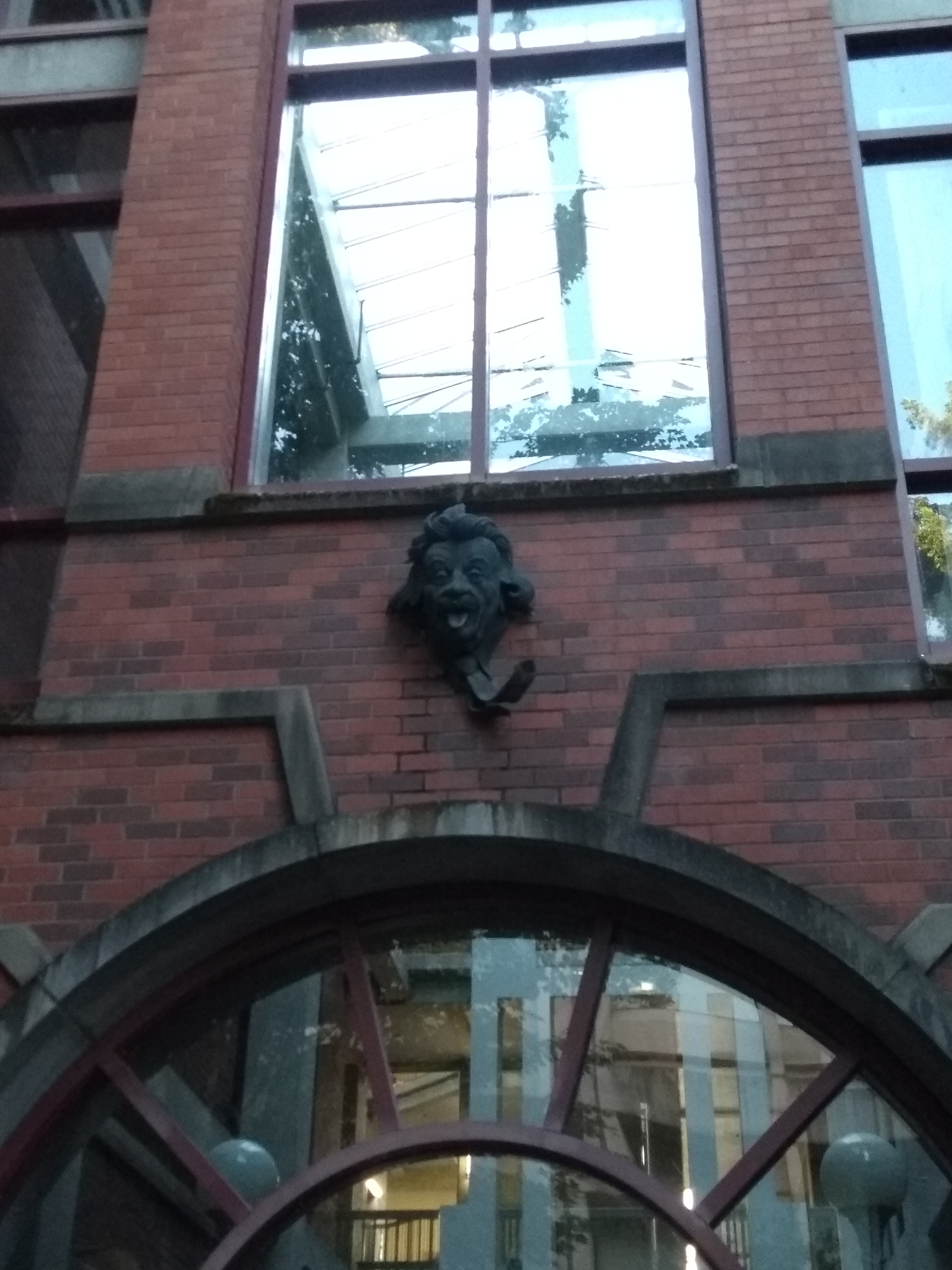
- The sculpture in 2019
- Artist: Wayne Chabre
- Year: 1986
- Type: Sculpture
- Medium: Hammered copper sheet
- Subject: Albert Einstein
- Dimensions: 0.76 m × 0.46 m × 0.46 m (2.5 ft × 1.5 ft × 1.5 ft)
- Condition: Undetermined (1993)
- Location: Eugene, Oregon, United States; 44.04610°N 123.07242°W
- Owner: University of Oregon

Einstein Gargoyle, also referred to as Albert Einstein, Einstein, and Einstein Gargoyles, is an outdoor 1986 sculpture by Wayne Chabre, installed on the exterior of Willamette Hall on the University of Oregon campus in Eugene, Oregon, United States. The portrait bust depicts Albert Einstein in high relief with a fluttering necktie, and was inspired by a photograph of the scientist on his birthday. It is made of hammered copper sheet and measures approximately 2.5 feet (0.76 m) x 1.5 feet (0.46 m) x 1.5 feet (0.46 m). The sculpture's condition was undetermined when it was surveyed by the Smithsonian Institution's "Save Outdoor Sculpture!" program in March 1993. The sculpture is administered by the University of Oregon.

== See also ==
- 1986 in art
- Albert Einstein in popular culture
