= Liberman =

Liberman [ˈlɪbərmən] (original Cyrillic Либерман [lʲɪbʲɪrˈman]), is a Russian-American variant of the German surname Liebermann. Liberman can also refer to:

== People ==
=== Surname ===
- Liberman family, Australian business family
- Alexander Liberman (1912–1999), Russian-American artist
- Alvin Liberman (1917–2000), American psychologist
- Anatoly Liberman (born 1937), linguist
- Arli Liberman (born 1986), Israeli-Australian composer
- Charles Liberman (born 1945), French ice hockey player
- Daniil and David Liberman (born 1982 and 1984), entrepreneurs
- David Liberman (1920–1983), Argentine psychiatrist
- Efim Liberman (1925–2011), Soviet biophysicist and physiologist
- Erik Liberman, American actor, author and director
- Evsei Liberman (1897–1981), Soviet economist
- Hyman Liberman (1853–1923), Polish-South African politician and businessman
- Isabelle Liberman (1918–1990), Latvian-American psychologist
- Jim Liberman (1945–1977), American funny car drag racer
- Joseph Liberman (1917–1941), Soviet mathematician
- Judith Liberman (born 1978), French fairy tale narrator
- Judith Weinshall Liberman (born 1929), Israeli artist
- Leonel Liberman (born 1972), Argentine footballer
- Luis Liberman (born 1946), Costa Rican businessman and politician
- Mark Liberman, American linguist
- M. Charles Liberman (born 1950), American physician and academic
- Raquel Liberman (1900–1935), Polish-Argentine sex trafficking victim
- Sally Liberman Smith (1929–2007), American educator
- Sylvain Liberman (1934–1988), French physicist
- Tetyana Hryhorivna Liberman, known as Tina Karol (born 1985), Ukrainian singer, actress, and television presenter
- Yaacov Liberman (1923–2015), Chinese-Israeli politician and author

=== Forename ===
- Liberman Agámez (born 1985), Colombian volleyball player
- Liberman Torres (born 2002), Ecuadorian footballer

== Other ==
- Liberman (album), 2015 album by Vanessa Carlton
- Liberman Broadcasting, American media company
- Liberman Broadcasting tower (Era, Texas), radio tower in the United States
- Liberman's lemma, mathematical theorem

== See also ==
- Lieberman, a surname
