= 1988 in art =

Events from the year 1988 in art.

== Events ==
- Opening of the Kiasma Contemporary Art Museum in Helsinki, designed by Steven Holl
- Donatello's bronze Judith and Holofernes is replaced on the Piazza della Signoria in Florence by a replica and moved inside the Palazzo Vecchio.
- David Hockney begins a series of paintings at his seaside home in Malibu, California.

== Exhibitions ==
- July – Freeze, Surrey Docks, London
- 18 September until 24 September - White Room: Bill Albertini at White Columns in New York City.

== Awards ==
- Archibald Prize: Fred Cress – John Beard
- Turner Prize – Tony Cragg

== Works ==
- Artists of Ramingining, Northern Territory, Australia – Aboriginal Memorial
- Tina Allen – A. Philip Randolph
- Francis Bacon – Second Version of Triptych 1944
- Gordon Bennett – Outsider
- Wayne Chabre
  - Gargoyles (Eugene, Oregon)
    - Alan Turing
    - Drosophila Fly Head
  - Grasshopper (sculpture, Salem, Oregon)
- Eldon Garnet – Little Glenn (bronze statue)
- Rachel Joynt – People's Island (brass installation, Dublin)
- Chris Killip – In Flagrante (photographic book)
- Judith Weinshall Liberman – Holocaust Wall Hangings (first works in series)
- Richard Lippold – Ex Stasis (sculpture)
- Paul Matisse – Kendall Band (sound sculpture)
- David K. Nelson, Jr. – Mirth & Girth
- Louise Nevelson – Sky Landscape (sculpture)
- Éamonn O'Doherty – Anna Livia (bronze installation, Dublin)
- Fred Parhad – Ashurbanipal (bronze, San Francisco)
- Zlatko Pounov and Steven Lowe – Statue of Mahatma Gandhi (San Francisco)
- Paula Rego – The Dance
- Gerhard Richter – Betty
- Susan Dorothea White – The First Supper
- Christopher Wool – Apocalypse Now ("word painting")

== Births ==
- 12 September – Alireza Shojaian, Iranian painter

== Deaths ==
=== January to June ===
- 19 January – Cesare Brandi, art critic, historian, and specialist in conservation-restoration theory (b. 1906).
- 31 January – Nedeljko Gvozdenović, a world-renowned Serbian painter (b. 1902).
- 3 February – Ronald Bladen, American sculptor (b. 1918).
- 19 March – Isabel Bishop, American painter and graphic artist (b. 1902).
- 28 March – Neil Williams, American painter (b. 1934).
- 31 March – Georges Lévis, French comic artist (b. 1924).
- 2 April – E. Chambré Hardman, Irish-born British photographer (b. 1898).
- 3 April – Milton Caniff, American cartoonist (b. 1907).
- 17 April
  - Toni Frissell, American photographer (b. 1907]).
  - Louise Nevelson, Ukrainian-born American artist (b. 1900).
- 26 April – Guy Boyd, Australian potter and figurative sculptor (b. 1923)
- 4 May – Stanley Hayter, English-born printmaker (b. 1901).
- 6 May – Constantino Nivola, Italian sculptor (b. 1911)
- 16 May – Charles Keeping, English illustrator, children's book author and lithographer (b. 1924).
- 16 June – Andrea Pazienza, Italian comics artist (b. 1956).

=== July to December ===
- 12 July – Julian Trevelyan, English printmaker (b. 1910).
- 24 July – Mira Schendel, Swiss-born Brazilian modernist artist and poet (b. 1919).
- 12 August – Jean-Michel Basquiat, American neo-expressionist painter, suicide (b. 1960).
- 21 August – Ray Eames, American artist and architect (b. 1912).
- 26 September – Marianne Appel, American mural painter and puppet designer (b. 1913).
- 29 September – Charles Addams, American cartoonist (b. 1912).
- 28 October – Pietro Annigoni, Italian painter (b. 1910)
- 12 November – Primo Conti, Italian Futurist artist (b. 1900).
- 25 November – Alphaeus Philemon Cole, American portrait artist (b. 1876 [sic.])
- 2 December – Kimon Evan Marengo, Egyptian-born British cartoonist (b. 1904).
- 30 December – Isamu Noguchi, Japanese American artist and landscape architect (b. 1904).

=== Date unknown ===
- Reginald George Haggar, English ceramic designer (b. 1905).

== See also ==
- 1988 in Fine Arts of the Soviet Union
