= David Maldavsky =

David Maldavsky was a doctor in philosophy and arts. He has written numerous books about psychoanalytic theory, psychopathology, clinic and also about methodology of the analysis of the discourse.

== Publications and background ==
Maldavsky's papers were published in relevant journals like Revista de psicoanálisis (Buenos Aires), Intersubjetivo (Madrid), Clínica e investigación relacional (Madrid), International Journal of Psychoanalysis, Revista del instituto de investigaciones (Universidad de Buenos Aires), Studies in psychology/ Estudios en psicología (Taylor and Francis), Acta psiquiátrica y psicológica de América Latina, Subjetividad y procesos cognitivos (Buenos Aires), Summa Psicológica (Chile), Itinerario (Uruguay), Desvalimiento Psicosocial (UCES, Buenos Aires), Journal of Advances in Linguistics, Psicoanálisis (Buenos Aires), Revista de psicanálise da SPPA (Porto Alegre) y Linguagem & Ensino (Pelotas). He is the head of the board of two peer reviewers journals: Subjetividad y Procesos Cognitivos y Desvalimiento Psicosocial. Some of his books were translated into English, French and Portuguese.

He was an editorial advisor of Revista de Psicoanálisis (1966–1980) and since 1980 he is co-director of the collection of psychology and psychoanalysis in Amorrortu editions. During 24 years he was a professor in Faculty of Psychology at the Universidad del Salvador (USAL). Between 1990-1999 he was the dean of the Faculty of Humanities and Social Sciences in the Universidad Hebrea Argentina Bar Ilán. Currently he directs the Doctorate in Psychology and the Master in Problems and Pathologies of Helplessness in Universidad de Ciencias Económicas y Sociales (UCES), and he participates in the Committee of Investigation of the Asociación Internacional de Psicoanálisis de Pareja y Familia (AIPPF). He has given conferences at the Universities of Paris, Caen, Lyon, Aix en Provence; Bordeaux; Complutense; Barcelona, Salamanca; Ramón Llull, LSE, The Anna Freud Centre, Unisinos, Ulbra, Mario Martins Foundation, de la República and UBA. He exposes regularly at the Annual Meeting of the Society for Psychotherapy Research, at the biennial congress of the International Psychoanalytic Association and the International Association of Couple and Family Psychoanalysis. The author also received grants from the IPA (twice), Fonsoft and The Royal Society Research contributions.

== Investigation - DLA ==
Since 2000, he has developed an investigation method of the verbal and non verbal expressions named David Liberman algorithm (DLA), designated in honour of David Liberman, an Argentinian pioneer in the field of the research in verbal expressions with a psychoanalytic approach. Both authors wrote a book named: "Psicoanálisis y Semiótica" that constitutes a result of the encounter between two different approaches: "The book constitutes the result of a nexus between two developments" The DLA started being a method that studies the Freudian concepts of wishes, defenses and their states in the verbal expressions in three fields: narrations, speech acts and words, and then it included also the study of the motor and graphic expressions. Individually and with collaborators, the author dedicated many books and papers to the description of the method and its implementation in clinical and psychosocial situations, like Investigaciones en procesos psicoanalíticos (2000), La investigación psicoanalítica del lenguaje (2003), Systematic research on psychoanalytic concepts and clinical practice: the David Liberman algorithm (DLA) (2005), La intersubjetividad en la clínica psicoanalítica (2007), ADL. Algoritmo David Liberman. Un instrumento para la evaluación de los deseos y las defensas en el discurso (2013).

In the development of the different instruments of the method, in addition to David Liberman's influence, could be mentioned the influence of Greimas, in the analysis of narrations and motor skills, the influence of Searles in the speech acts analysis, and the influence of the Groupe μ in the analysis of the iconic and plastic components of the visual sign.

The instruments of the DLA have been implemented regularly throughout masters and doctorate thesis by students of Argentina, Brasil, Mexico and Ecuador.

== Selected bibliography ==
- Teoría de las representaciones (Nueva Visión; 1977)
- El complejo de Edipo positivo, constitución y transformaciones (ISBN 978-950-518-489-7; Amorrortu; 1982)
- Estructuras narcisistas. Constitución y transformaciones (ISBN 978-950-518-497-2;Amorrortu; 1988),
- Procesos y estructuras vinculares (ISBN 978-950-602-221-1; Nueva Visión; 1990)
- Teoría y clínica de los procesos tóxicos (ISBN 978-950-518-526-9; Amorrortu; 1992)
- Pesadillas en vigilia (ISBN 978-950-518-549-8; Amorrortu; 1995)
- Linajes abúlicos (ISBN 978-950-12-4195-2; Paidós; 1996)
- Sobre las ciencias de la subjetividad (ISBN 978-950-602-355-3; Nueva Visión; 1997)
- Lenguajes del erotismo (ISBN 978-950-602-379-9; Nueva Visión; 1998)
- Lenguaje, pulsiones, defensas (ISBN 978-950-602-416-1; Nueva Visión; 1999).
