= SHBT =

SHBT may refer to:

- Speech and Hearing Bioscience and Technology
- Single heterojunction bipolar transistor
- Surrey Historic Buildings Trust
