= Nelson Kiang =

Chinese-American neuroscientist

- Born: July 6, 1929; Wuxi, China
- Died: March 19, 2023 (aged 93); Boston, MA
- Education: University of Chicago
- Known for: Auditory Brainstem Response
- Scientific career
- Fields: Auditory science, Neuroscience
- Workplaces: Massachusetts Eye and Ear Infirmary; Harvard Medical School; Massachusetts Institute of Technology; Massachusetts General Hospital
- Doctoral advisor: William D. Neff
- Doctoral students: M. Charles Liberman

Nelson Yuan-Sheng Kiang (July 6, 1929 – March 19, 2023) (Chinese: 江淵聲) was the founder and former director of the Eaton-Peabody Laboratory of Auditory Physiology (established in 1958) at the Massachusetts Eye and Ear Infirmary and professor emeritus of Otology and Laryngology at the Harvard Medical School and also professor emeritus at the Massachusetts Institute of Technology. He was also emeritus in Neurology at the Massachusetts General Hospital and a trustee of the Massachusetts Eye and Ear Infirmary.

Kiang received his Ph.D. in biopsychology from the University of Chicago in 1955, with William D. Neff as his advisor, and he has many notables in the auditory field among his ex-students. He received an honorary M.D. from the University of Geneva. He arrived at MIT in 1955 and in 1958, Dr. Kiang partnered with Amelia Peabody to establish the Eaton-Peabody Laboratory (EPL) at Massachusetts Eye and Ear. Dr. Kiang served as laboratory director until 1996 and would oversee its rapid growth into the largest research group in the world dedicated to the study of hearing and deafness. In 1992 he founded the Speech and Hearing Sciences Program (now Speech and Hearing Bioscience and Technology Ph.D. program) which he directed until he retired. His former student M. Charles Liberman replaced him as director of the EPL.

Kiang was an honorary or advisory professor at four Chinese universities and advised people in five ministries in China. After retirement, his interests were in world health and world education.

Kiang recounts the early history of the EPL in a memoir that is part of the EPL history project.

Kiang has been credited as the first to demonstrate the auditory brainstem response, and to propose using such electrical signals from the brain to diagnose hearing disorders.

In the early 1960s, as a pioneering researcher on sound coding in the auditory nerve, Kiang proposed the possibility of translating sound into multi-channel electrical signals as a way to give a sense of hearing to people with cochlear deafness – that is, cochlear implants. In the early 1970s, after cochlear implantation experiments on humans had started with single-channel devices, Kiang strongly supported those urging caution with such human experimentation, arguing that our knowledge of coding in the auditory system was not yet sufficient and that single-channel devices were not up to the task. Both single- and multi-channel experimentation continued, and human experimentation along with continued auditory research led to advances (and continue to do so into the 21st century) that support success with modern multi-channel cochlear implants.

In the 1990s, Kiang suggested investigating the response of the vestibular part of the inner ear to very low frequencies in relation to wind turbine syndrome.
