= Stories of the Saints =

Graphic novel

Stories of the Saints: Bold and Inspiring Tales of Adventure, Grace, and Courage is a book written by Carey Wallace, illustrated by Nick Thornborrow, and published by Workman Publishing Company.

== Background ==
The book was published on March 31, 2020, by Workman Publishing Company with a total of 232 pages. The book is written by Carey Wallace and illustrated by Nick Thornborrow. Wallace lives in Brooklyn, New York. The book tells the story of 70 different saints. For instance, the book includes stories about Thérèse of Lisieux, Joan of Arc, and Francis of Assisi. The book focuses on Catholic saints and does not include Anglican saints. The Roman Catholic Archdiocese of Oklahoma City criticized the book for making some factual errors. The book is intended for children ages 10 and up. The book does not shy aware from the struggles that saints have experienced. The publisher of the book is not Catholic. The stories are organized chronologically. Christianity Today called the story "elegantly crafted" and the illustrations "engrossing". The book won a silver Nautilus award in 2020.

== See also ==
- The Blind Contessa's New Machine
- The Ghost in the Glass House
