= Iron-on =

Image that can be transferred to fabric by the application of heat and pressure

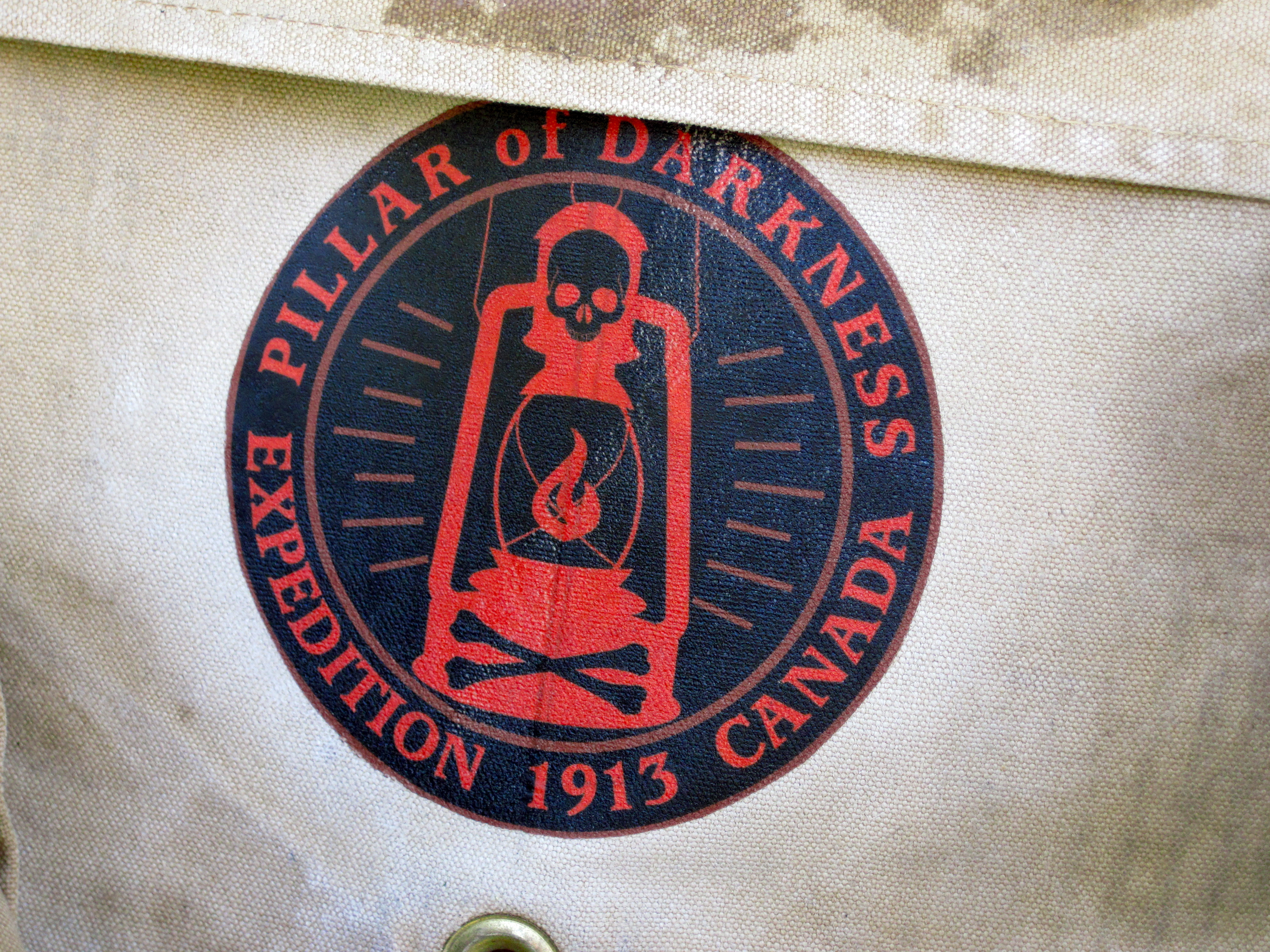
A logo applied to a canvas backpack, using fabric transfer paper in a desktop ink jet printer

Iron-on transfers are images that can be imprinted on fabric. They are frequently used to print onto T-shirts.

On one side is paper, and on the other is the image that will be transferred in reverse. The image is printed with iron-on transfer inks. After placing the iron-on transfer on the fabric and pressing with an iron or a heat press, the image is transferred to the fabric.

There are two primary types of iron-on transfer inks: plastisol-type and sublimation-type. Plastisol-type inks are thick with a lacquer base. Transfers made with plastisol-type inks will result in a flexible image on the fabric with a feel similar to rubber. Sublimation-type inks use dyelike pigments that can be transferred to polyester and nylon fabrics. Transfers made with sublimation-type inks literally transfer the pigments to the fabric and the pigments bond permanently to the fabric fibers.

Commercial quality heat transfer paper used in a heat press will yield much better results in terms of 'hand' (how the print feels on the fabric) and durability than store bought papers or transfers applied with a home iron.

The advantages of commercial heat transfer over screenprinting are that it is relatively cheap and easy to create one-off, full color designs. Also, when compared with dye sublimation techniques, heat transfers can be used on 100% cotton garments, whereas dye sublimation requires at least a 50/50 poly cotton garment.

Iron-on transfer paper is available for use with computer printers. A number of inkjet, copier and laser printer toners have been developed to utilize this process.

== Fabric ==
Iron-on fabric has a glue backing that melts into another fabric when it is applied with heat. It is used to patch torn clothes or to reinforce fabric in places subject to extreme wear. An alternative to iron-on adhesive is dryer heat activated adhesive.

== Labels ==
There are primarily two types of iron-on labels: a form of material tape; and a form of vinyl similar to that used on graphic t-shirts. With the vinyl type the objective is to effectively melt the label onto the cloth so the label and garment become one, hence a permanent bond. The application of a label typically takes about 10–15 seconds for the label to become one with the garment and then a few minutes to cool.

== Applique ==
Iron-on appliques are decorative embroidery items with a melt-glue backing.

== Culture ==
Fijian artist Joana Monolagi uses iron-on fabrics in her traditional barkcloth weaving.
