= Statue of Mahatma Gandhi (San Francisco) =

Statue of Mahatma Gandhi by Zlatko Paunov in San Francisco, California, U.S.

Mohandas K. Gandhi
- Artist: Zlatko Paunov; Steven Lowe
- Year: 1988
- Type: Sculpture
- Medium: Bronze
- Subject: Mahatma Gandhi
- Dimensions: 2.4 m (8 ft)
- Location: San Francisco, California, United States; 37°47′43″N 122°23′33″W

Mohandas K. Gandhi is a 1988 bronze sculpture of Mahatma Gandhi sculpted by Zlatko Paunov and Steven Lowe. It is located in the plaza to the southeast of the San Francisco Ferry Building along the Embarcadero in San Francisco, California, United States. The 8-foot (2.4 m) tall sculpture is mounted on a block which bears a plaque, raised on two steps. It was a gift from the Gandhi Memorial International Foundation.

== Reception ==
The statue was dedicated by Art Agnos, the Mayor of San Francisco, on October 3, 1988. A similar statue by the same sculptors, Paunov and Lowe, was unveiled under a banyan tree in Kapiolani Park in Honolulu in 1990.

msnbc.com contributor Chris Rodell wrote that the sculpture of Gandhi, a "renowned vegetarian", was appropriate for the plaza, being the site of a weekly farmers' market.

In 2010, a group called the Organization for Minorities of India, which formed to protest the oppression of Indian minorities, demanded the removal of the sculpture, claiming Gandhi was a racist "who harbored violent urges".

The sculpture is a known target for vandalism; the eyeglasses are the most-stolen item, and the staff has been broken on several occasions.

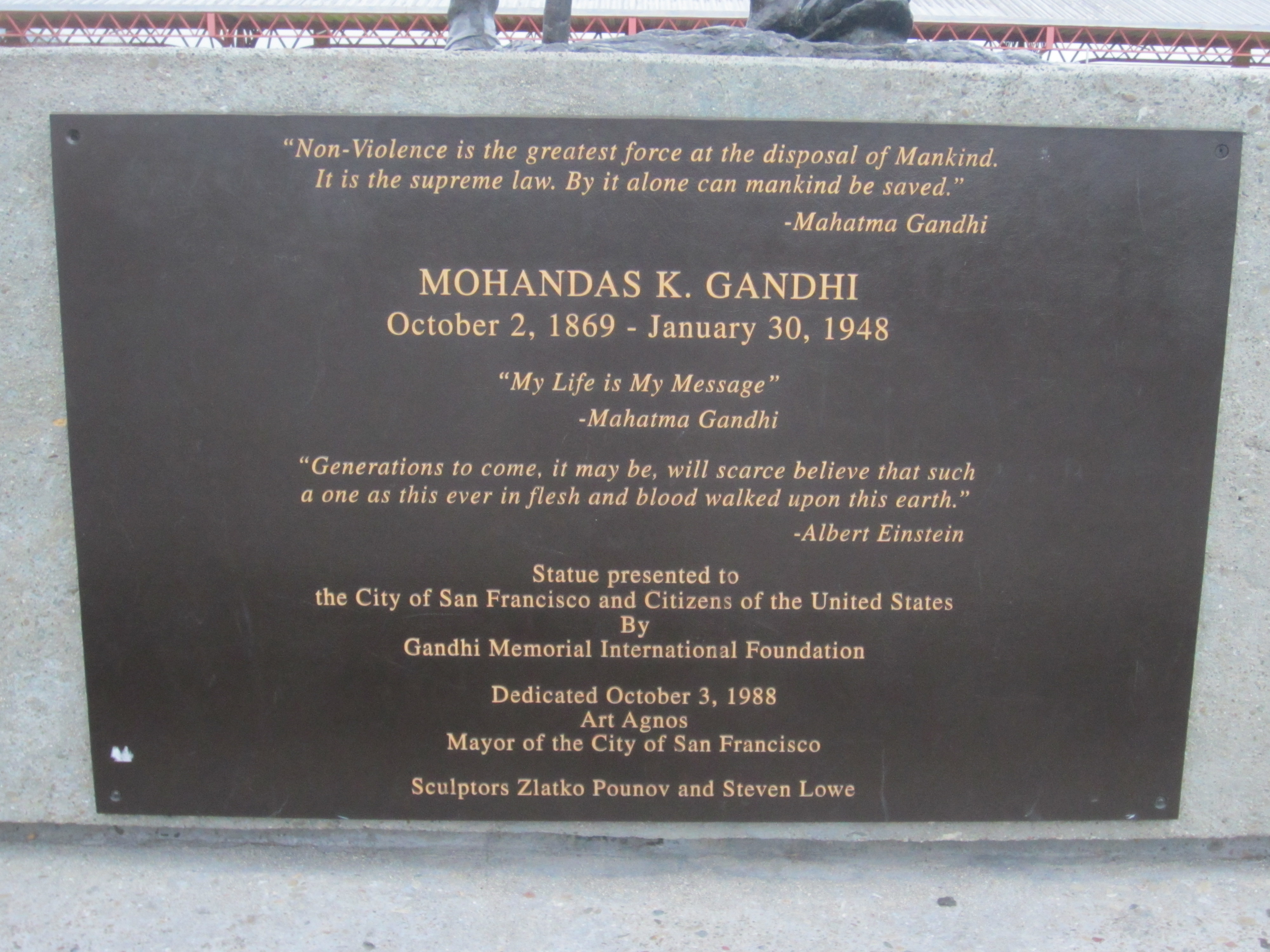
Plaque

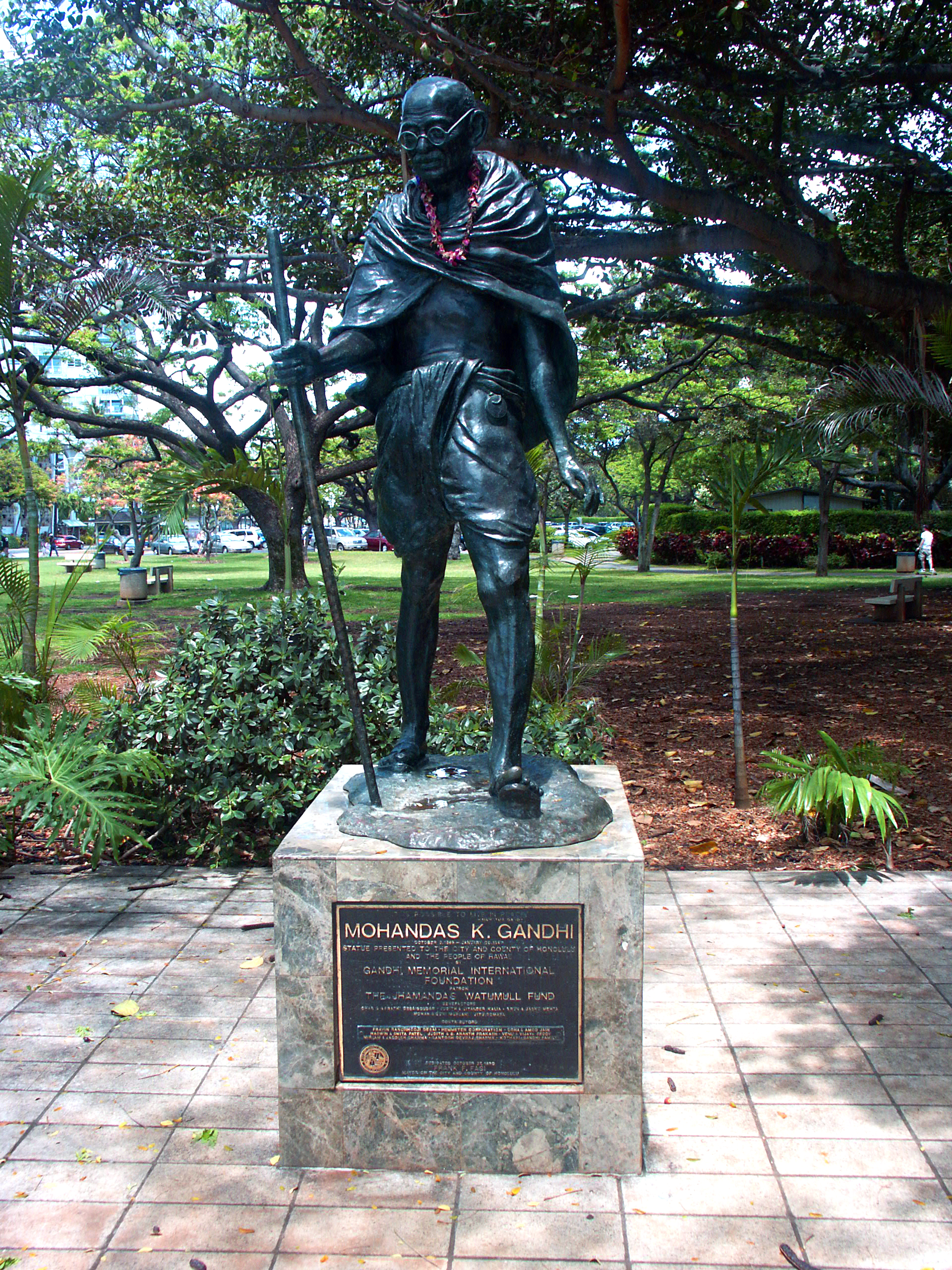
Statue of Gandhi by Paunov and Lowe in Hawaii

== See also ==
- 1988 in art
- List of artistic depictions of Mahatma Gandhi
