= Holocaust Wall Hangings =

Fbric designs by Judith Weinshall Liberman

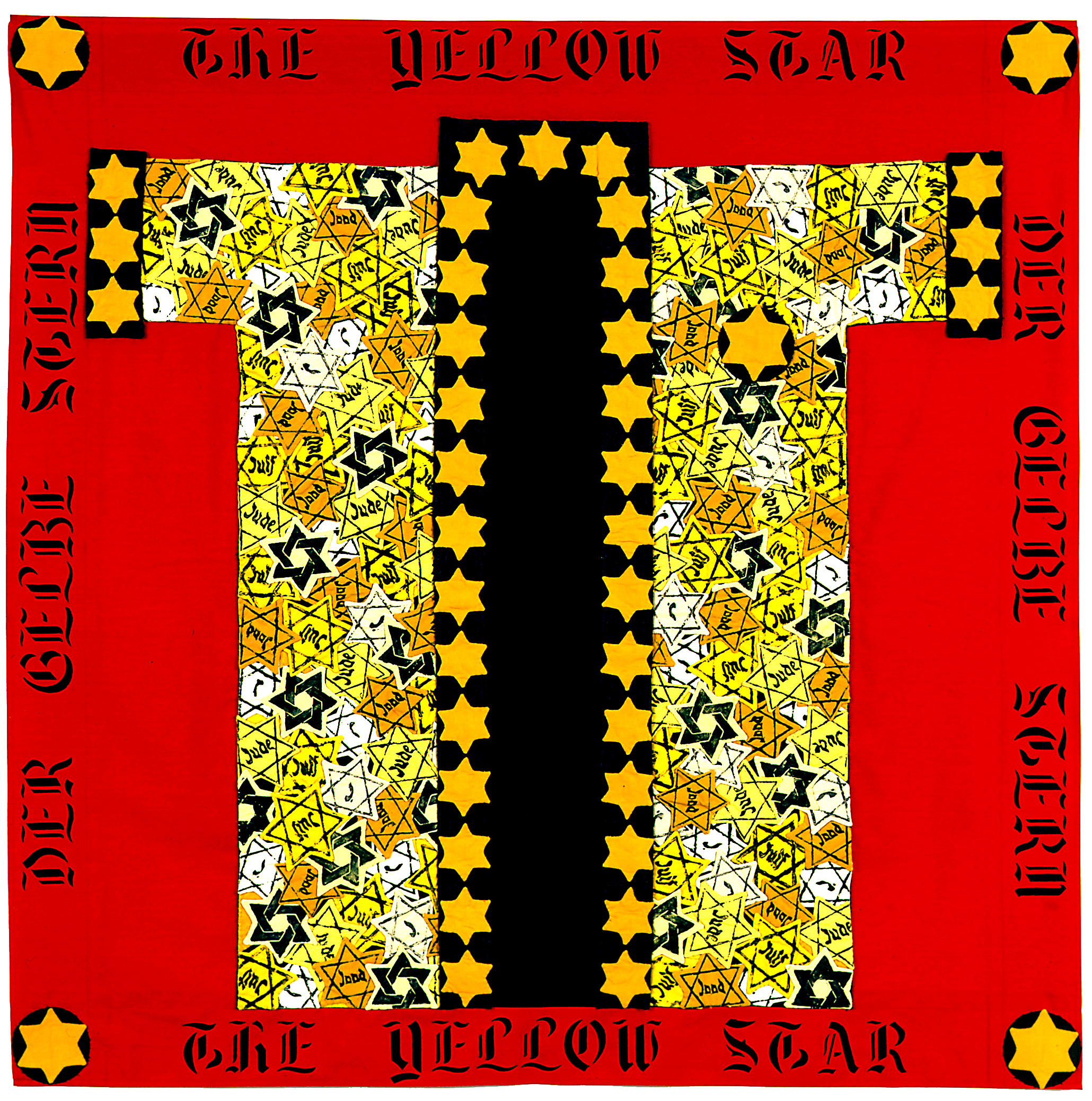
- Yellow Star by Judith Weinshall Liberman (1994) / Scenes of the Holocaust / 51"x51"
- Artist: Judith Weinshall Liberman
- Year: created 1988–2002
- Medium: Paint, appliqué, embroidery, stenciling, beadwork, block printing, image transfer
- Location: Temple Tifereth-Israel, Florida Holocaust Museum, Yad Vashem Museum

The Holocaust Wall Hangings by Judith Weinshall Liberman are a series of sixty loose-hanging fabric banners of varying sizes created between 1988 and 2002. They illustrate the plight of the Jewish people and other minorities during the Holocaust of World War II.

== Background ==
Judith Weinshall Liberman was born in 1929 and grew up in Haifa, Mandatory Palestine (present-day Israel) during the years of the Holocaust. In 1947, she moved to America to attend college and received four American university degrees including a J.D. degree from the University of Chicago Law School and an LL.M. degree from the University of Michigan Law School. In 1956, she turned her attention to the arts and began studying drawing, painting, sculpture, and other art mediums at the School of Practical Art, the School of the Museum of Fine Arts, the DeCordova Museum School, the Boston University College of Fine Arts and the Massachusetts College of Art and Design.

In 1988, after spending a year painting more than two dozen works about the Holocaust on stretched canvas, Weinshall Liberman began using loose-hanging fabric as the background for her art. In her 2002 book, Holocaust Wall Hangings, Weinshall Liberman reveals that the decision to place Holocaust-themed imagery on loose-hanging fabric was inspired by her childhood memories of propaganda banners and flags of the Third Reich that were typically hung on podiums, balconies, and walls at National Socialist German Workers' Party (NSDAP) rallies and ceremonies. Because these banners and their insignia promoted Nazi ideology and genocide, Weinshall Liberman found it fitting to use similar hanging fabrics in her art tribute to those who suffered during the Holocaust.

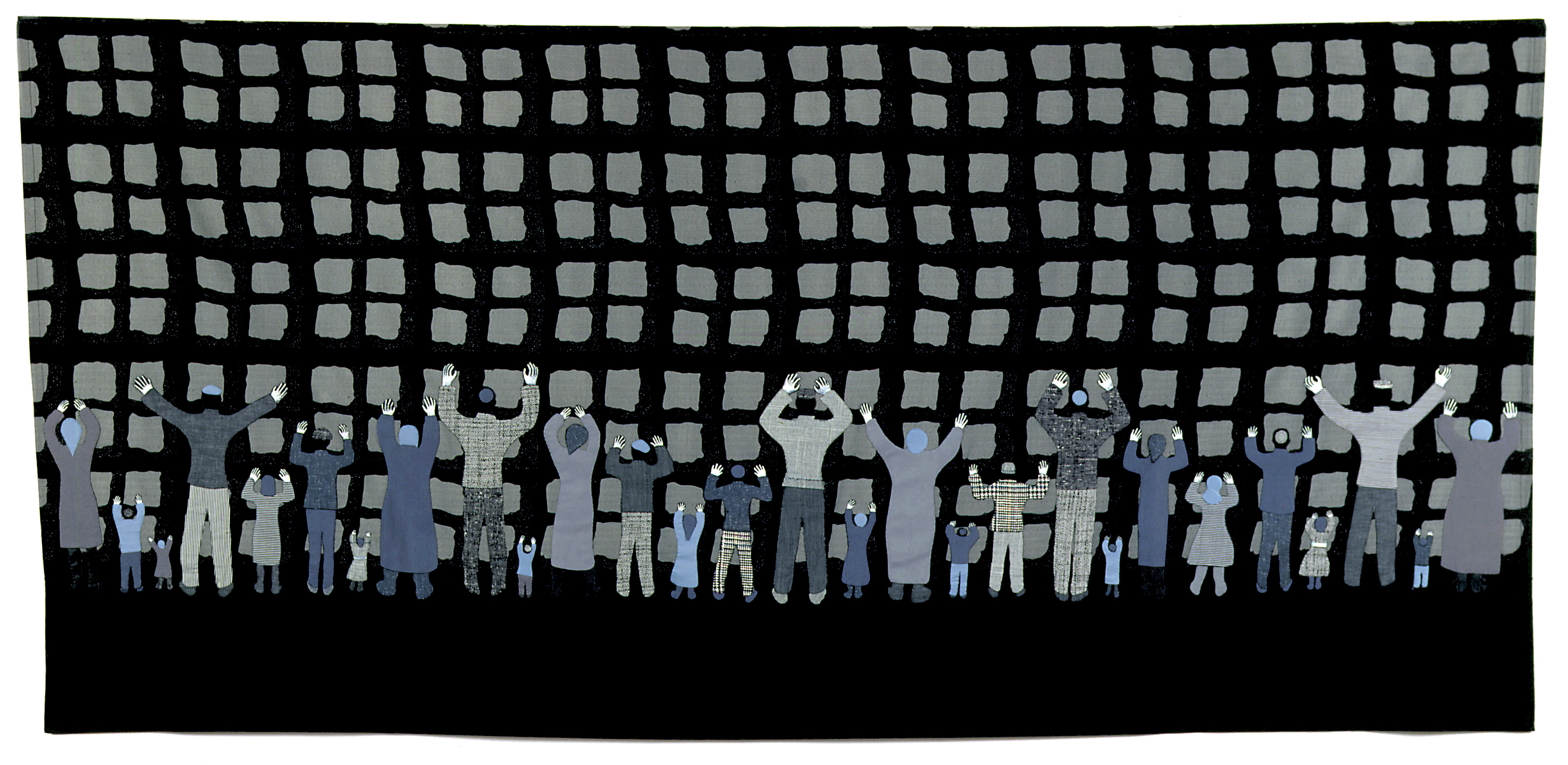
Hands Up by Judith Weinshall Liberman (1989) / Scenes of the Holocaust / 46"x97"

The Holocaust Wall Hangings are grouped into three categories: Scenes of the Holocaust, which focus on people portrayed as totally isolated or depicted as part of a depersonalized mass; Maps of the Holocaust which document the Holocaust with places, numbers. and other symbols of destruction, and a third group, the Epilogue wall hangings, which mostly explore God's relationship to the Holocaust.

== Materials ==
To convey her feelings about the Holocaust, Weinshall Liberman chose fabrics ranging in height from 18 to 97 inches (46 to 246 cm) and in length from 21 to 172 inches (53 to 437 cm). She used a color palette of mostly red, gray and black – red: blood and fire; gray: suffering and despair; black: death – and besides the primary use of painting and block printing, Weinshall Liberman utilized various combinations of stenciling, sewing, appliqué, embroidery, beading, and image transfer.

== Exhibitions ==
The Holocaust Wall Hangings have been displayed in exhibitions in the United States, Israel, and Hungary and have been featured in numerous museums and other public institutions including Yad Vashem in Jerusalem, Israel; Mishkan Museum of Art in Ein Harod, Israel; the Florida Holocaust Museum in St. Petersburg, Florida; the Temple Museum of Jewish Art, Religion and Culture of the Temple Tifereth-Israel in Beachwood, Ohio; the Maltz Museum of Jewish Heritage in Beachwood, Ohio; the DeCordova Museum in Lincoln, Massachusetts; and at the Long Island Museum of American Art, History, and Carriages in Long Island, New York. In 2009, the wall hangings were featured at the Rumbach Street Synagogue in Budapest, Hungary in the exhibit Anne Frank in the Artists' Eyes, bringing recognition to the 80th birthday of Anne Frank.

== Critical responses ==
Judith Weinshall Liberman's Holocaust Wall Hangings have been recognized by publications and institutions such as The New York Times, NBC News, the Holocaust Teacher Resource Center, the Tampa Bay Times and the Cleveland Jewish News. Helen A. Harrison of the New York Times states that within the Holocaust Wall Hangings, "Abstraction and repetition are applied to the symbolism of repression, removing it from the realm of personal suffering and elevating it to the level of universal tragedy." Ori Soltes, art and theology teacher at Georgetown University and former director of the B'nai B'rith Klutznick National Jewish Museum in Washington, D.C., believes that the soft materials Weinshall Liberman uses in her work "provide an important contrast to the Holocaust tragedy." Soltes says, "Using that kind of material for something which is so harsh and hard-edged to my mind is sort of an interesting conceptual leap." In her article "Powerful Works on Fabric a Tribute to Holocaust," critic Fran Heller of the Cleveland Jewish News notes that "Liberman's color palette of red, gray and black symbolizes blood and fire, suffering, despair and death (and) it is both forceful and aesthetically moving."

== Archives ==
The Judith Weinshall Liberman Papers, 1960–2003, a collection of photographs, slides, videos and manuscripts of panel discussions and exhibition installations relating to the Holocaust Wall Hangings, has been catalogued by the Smithsonian Institution's Archives of American Art. Weinshall Liberman's book Holocaust Wall Hangings (2002), a companion piece to the wall hanging collection, has been digitally archived in the Fine Arts Department at the Boston Public Library.
