= Transfer paper =

Type of paper

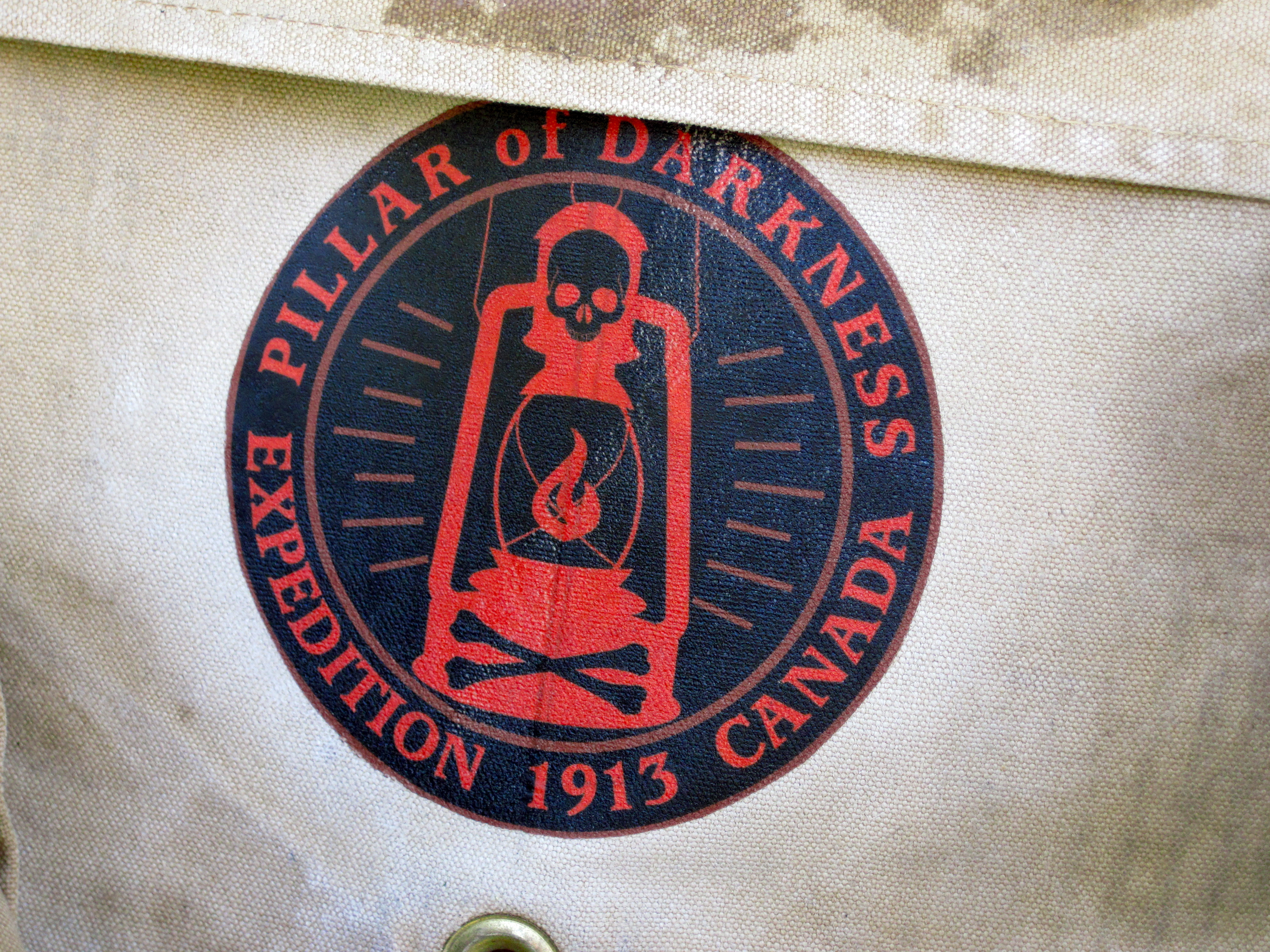
A logo applied to a canvas backpack, using fabric transfer paper in a desktop ink jet printer

Transfer paper is used in textiles and arts and crafts projects. Transfer paper is a thin piece of paper coated with wax and pigment. Often, an ink-jet or other printer is used to print the image on the transfer paper. A heat press can transfer the image onto clothing, canvas, or other surface. Transfer paper is used in creating iron-ons. Transfer papers can also be used for the application of rhinestones to clothing and other arts and crafts projects.

== Inkjet ==
Most conventional inkjet printers are not capable of printing white (though many wide-format and direct-to-garment inkjet printers offer white ink as an option). So on these devices, in any white areas, the garment's existing colour shows through. The mirror of the image is printed on paper. When it is transferred, the result is the mirror of the mirror (the original) results. Inkjet transfer paper for dark garments is covered with transferable white ink. For dark garments, the image is printed without mirroring. Garment printing needs transfer paper for high-quality garment printing results.

Washability for inkjet transfer paper is not as good as for screen-printed items.

== Dye sublimation ==
For dye sublimation transfer paper, fabrics historically had to be white or light in color. 100% polyester, poly/cotton mix (the garment should be at least 50% polyester) microfibre and nylon can all be used. This printing process turns solid ink into a gas, avoiding a liquid stage. This process can be used on ceramic, wood, glass, or metal as long as they have a polymer coating.

Transfer papers now exist for most textiles, including elastic fabrics used for making sportswear and swimming suits, and for natural fiber fabrics such as cotton, silk, linen, and wool.

== Colour laser ==
Colour laser transfer is very similar to the inkjet transfer paper process and allows the decoration of any combination of fabric blends including 50/50 poly/cotton blends as well as 100% cotton textiles. This type of transfer paper is used for industrial printing jobs on a large scale offering better quality paper and image transfer.

== History ==
"The initial intent for this method of moving a pre- made image from one location to another was to serve as an essential substitute for ink. In 1801, Pellegrino Turri, an Italian inventor, invented carbon paper to provide the ink for his mechanical typing machine, one of the first typewriters." Ralph Wedgwood obtained the first patent for carbon paper in 1806. Wedgwood's technique was then continuously perfected.

== See also ==
- Carbon paper
