= Statue of Ashurbanipal (San Francisco) =

Bronze statue by Fred Parhad in San Francisco, California, U.S.

Ashurbanipal
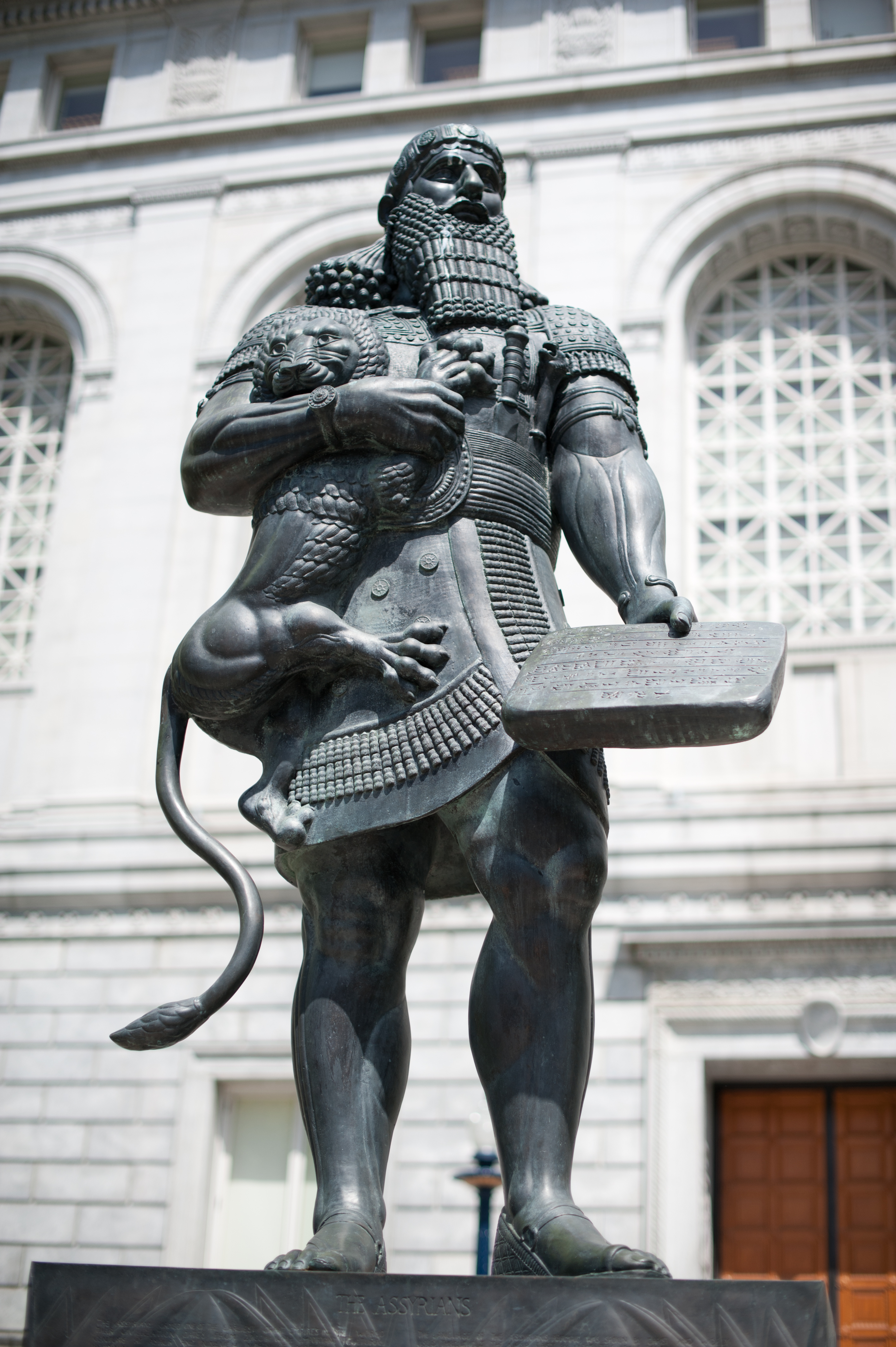
- Ashurbanipal in April 2011
- Artist: Fred Parhad
- Year: 1987–1988
- Type: Sculpture
- Medium: Bronze
- Subject: Ashurbanipal
- Dimensions: 4.6 m (15 ft)
- Weight: ~1,800 lb (820 kg)
- Location: San Francisco, California, United States; 37°46′48″N 122°24′58″W
- Owner: Administered by the City and County of San Francisco and the San Francisco Arts Commission

Ashurbanipal, also known as the Ashurbanipal Monument or the Statue of Ashurbanipal, is a bronze sculpture by Fred Parhad, an artist of Assyrian descent. It is located in the Civic Center of San Francisco, California, in the United States. The 15-foot (4.6 m) statue depicting the Assyrian king of the same name was commissioned by the Assyrian Foundation for the Arts and presented to the City of San Francisco in 1988 as a gift from the Assyrian people. The sculpture reportedly cost $100,000 and was the first "sizable" bronze statue of Ashurbanipal. It is administered by the City and County of San Francisco and the San Francisco Arts Commission.

Parhad's work was met with some criticism by local Assyrians, who argued it was inaccurate to portray Ashurbanipal holding a clay tablet and a lion, or wearing a skirt. The critics thought the statue looked more like the Sumerian king Gilgamesh; Renee Kovacs, a Yale Ph.D, believed the sculpture depicted neither figure, but rather a Mesopotamian "protective figure". Parhad defended the accuracy of his work, while also admitting that he took artistic liberties.

== Background ==
In Assyrian sculpture, the famous colossal entrance way guardian figures of lamassu were often accompanied by a hero grasping a wriggling lion with one hand and typically a snake with the other, also colossal and in high relief; these are generally the only other types of high relief in Assyrian sculpture. They continue the Master of Animals tradition in Mesopotamian art, and may represent Enkidu or Gilgamesh, the central figures in the Ancient Mesopotamian Epic of Gilgamesh. In the palace of Sargon II at Khorsabad, a group of at least seven lamassu and two such heroes with lions surrounded the entrance to the "throne room", "a concentration of figures which produced an overwhelming impression of power." The arrangement was repeated in Sennacherib's palace at Nineveh.

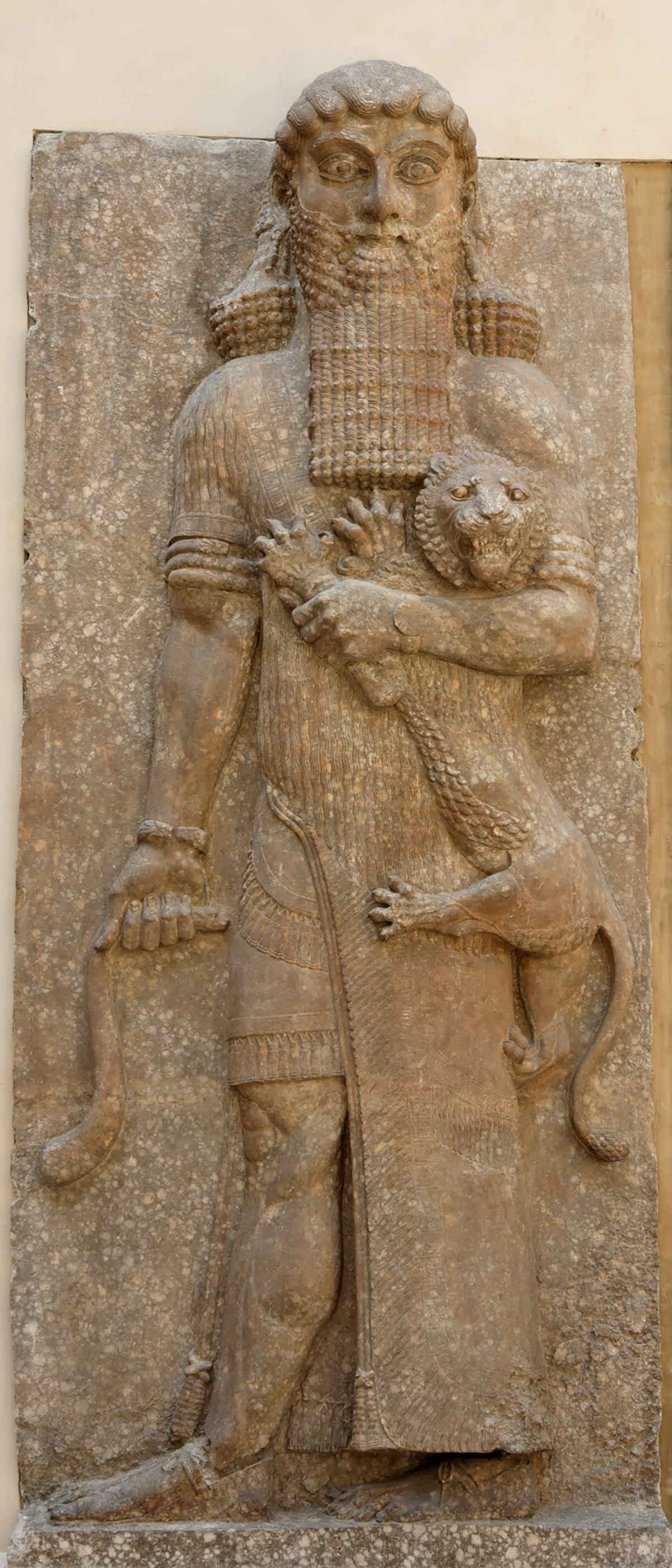
Possible representation of Gilgamesh or Enkidu as Master of Animals grasping a lion and snake, in an Assyrian palace relief, from Dur-Sharrukin, now Louvre

== Description ==
Inscriptions under the statue
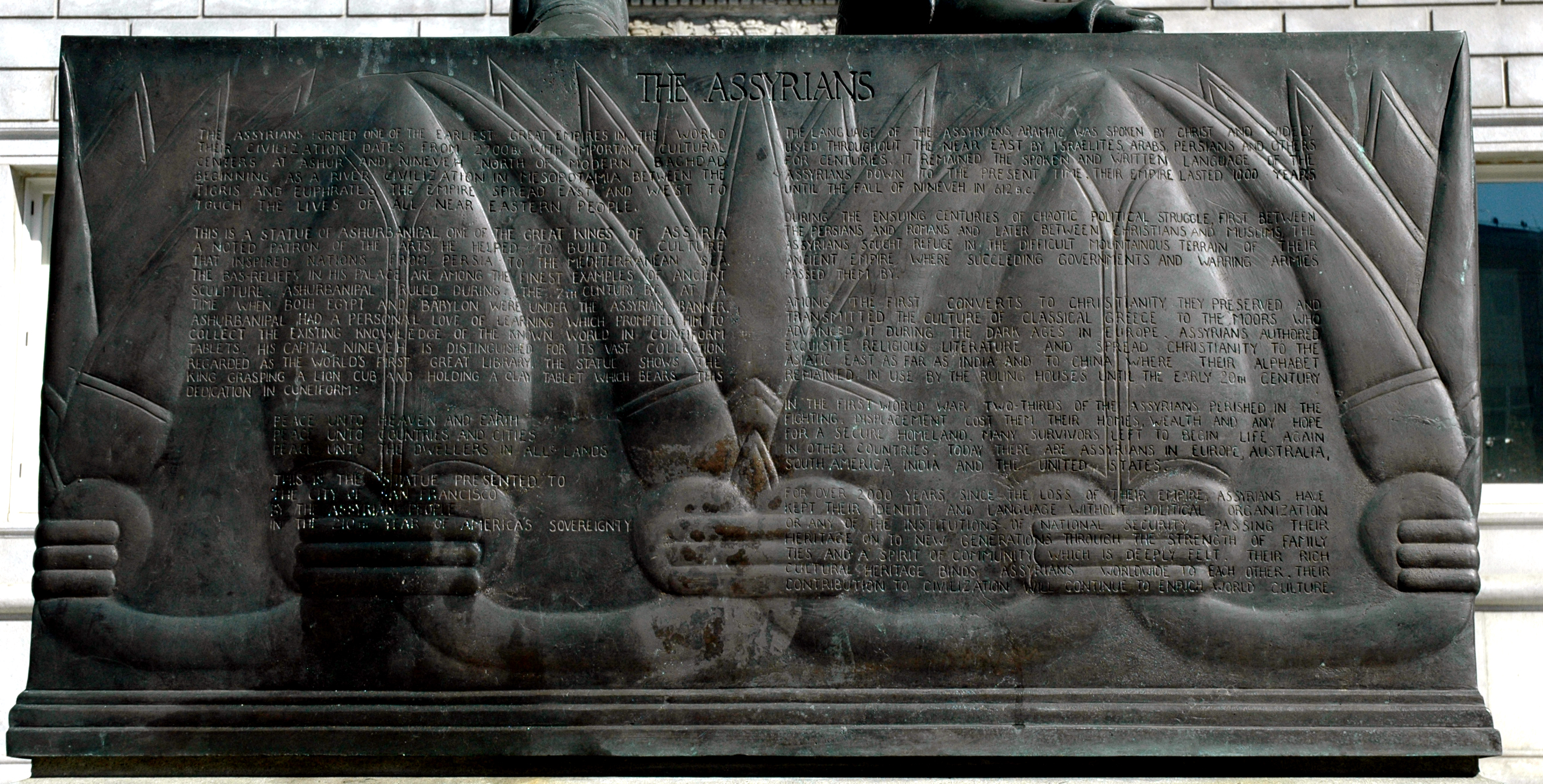
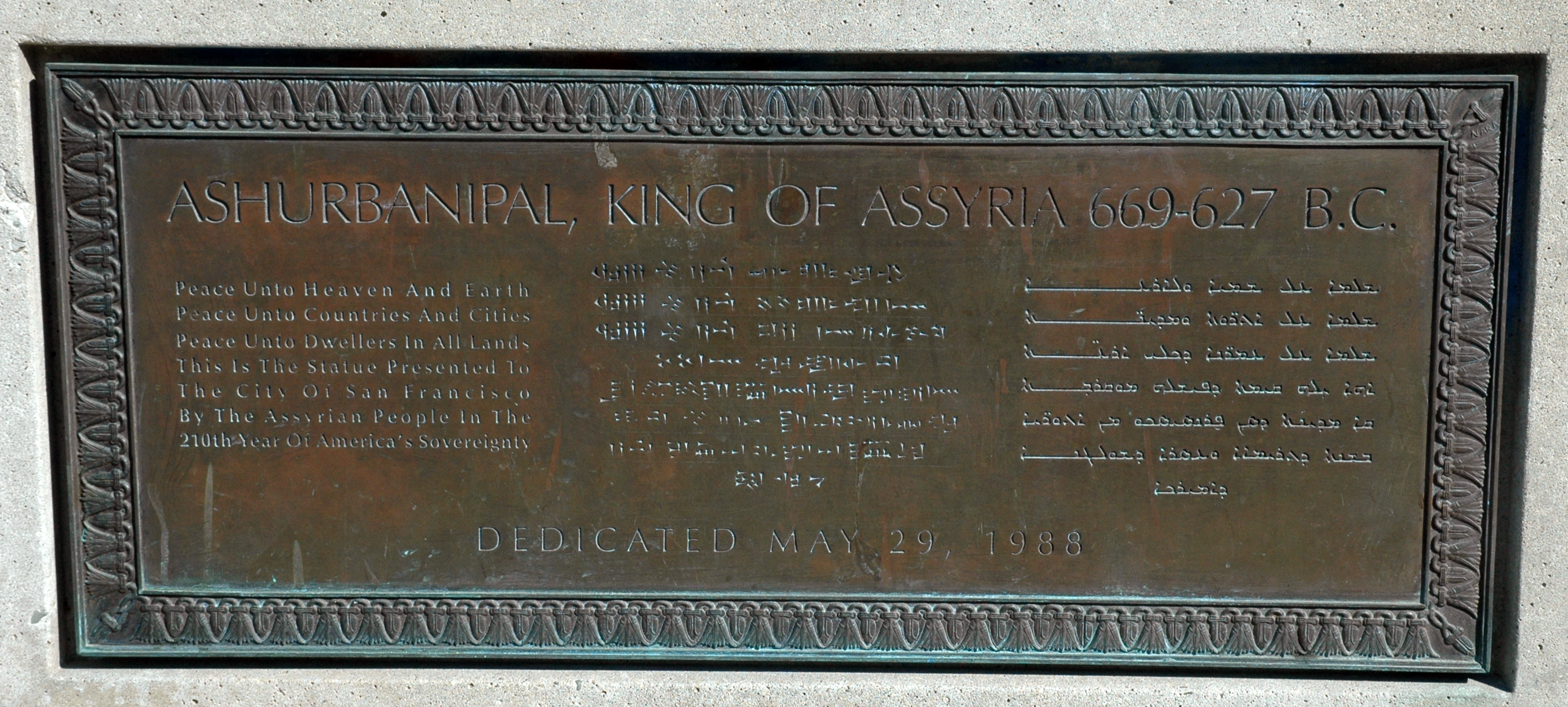

The 8-foot (2.4 m) patinated bronze statue, mounted on a base and a plinth to reach a total height of 15 feet (4.6 m), weighs approximately 1,800 pounds (820 kg). It depicts Ashurbanipal, the Assyrian king known for building the eponymously named Library of Ashurbanipal, the first and largest library in Nineveh. The bearded king is shown wearing earrings and a tunic; he is holding a clay tablet in one hand and restraining a lion cub against his chest with the other. According to the Historical Marker Database, the cuneiform inscribed on the tablet reads: "Peace unto heaven and earth / Peace unto countries and cities / Peace unto the dwellers in all lands / This is the statue presented to the City of San Francisco by the Assyrian people in the 210th year of America's sovereignty".

The "larger-than-life", full length statue stands above a plinth adorned with a lotus blossom design and a concrete base with an anti-graffiti coating. The base includes rosettes and a bronze plaque. One inscription below the statue reads the text of the tablet in English, Akkadian cuneiform and Aramaic. The text "Ashurbanipal, King of Assyria, 669–627 B.C." appears above and the text "Dedicated May 29, 1988" appears below, both in English. Another inscription below the statue reads, "Presented to the City of San Francisco by the Assyrian Foundation for the Arts through donations of American Assyrian Association of San Francisco / Assyrian American National Federation", followed by a list of names of donors. In December 2010, the San Francisco Chronicle reported that a large plaque from the sculpture was missing.

== History ==
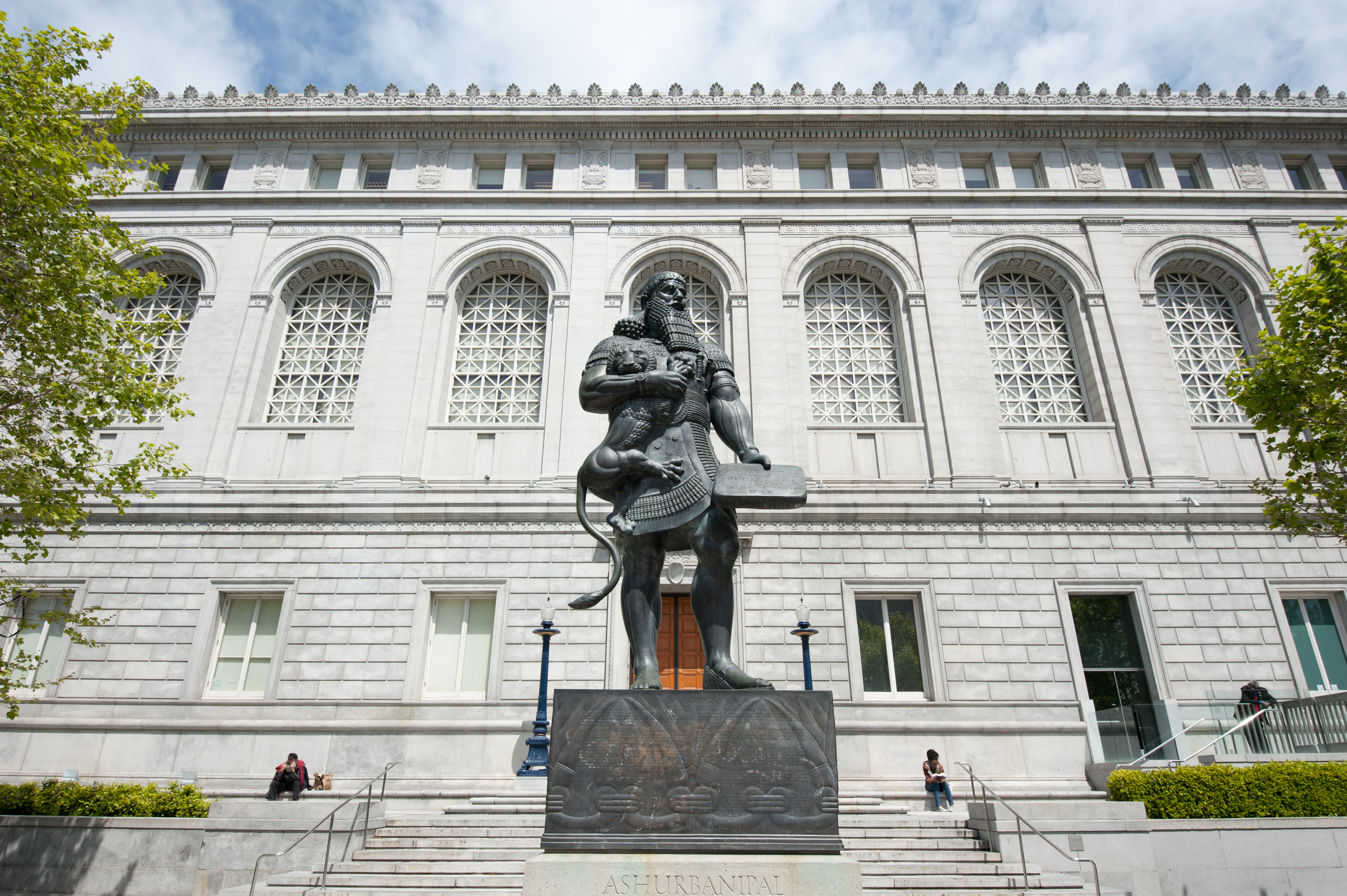
The statue, mounted on its base in front of the Asian Art Museum, in 2011

Ashurbanipal was designed by Fred Parhad, an Iraqi-born artist of Assyrian descent. Parhad rejected formal arts studies at the University of California, Berkeley and relocated to New York, where the Metropolitan Museum of Art allowed him to study its Assyrian collection. The work was commissioned by the Assyrian Foundation for the Arts under the direction of its president, Narsai David. The Assyrian Universal Alliance Foundation also claims to have commissioned the work. Funds were collected from Assyrians throughout the United States.

In 1987, The Telegraph reported that the work cost $100,000 and was the first "sizable" bronze statue of Ashurbanipal. It was presented to the City of San Francisco as a gift from the Assyrian people on May 29, 1988, unveiled at the entry to the Asian Art Museum on Van Ness Avenue. The statue now stands on Fulton Street between the Main Library and Asian Art Museum, within the city's Civic Center. It is administered by the City and County of San Francisco and the San Francisco Arts Commission.

The Smithsonian Institution lists Frank Tomsick as the installation's architect and MBT Associates as its architectural firm. Ashurbanipal was surveyed by the Smithsonian's Save Outdoor Sculpture! program in 1992. In 1996, plans for a Civic Center pedestrian mall were being developed by the San Francisco Planning and Urban Research Association; one planner advocated for construction of an Assyrian garden, including lotus blossoms, pomegranate trees and reeds, at the site of the statue.

== Reception ==
In December 1987, as news began to circulate about the commissioned work, local Assyrians accused Parhad of misrepresenting Ashurbanipal. Criticisms included the depiction of the king holding both a clay tablet and a lion, which they argued he "wouldn't do", and for dressing him in a skirt, which they claimed he would never have worn. The critics thought the statue made a better portrayal of the Sumerian king Gilgamesh. One critic said:

It's very simple. The statue represents Gilgamesh.... No Assyrian has a right to imagine things about our king. It's exactly like making a copy of the Statue of Liberty and saying it is George Washington.... Assyrian kings didn't wear miniskirts. They wouldn't have been holding a lion or a book. It's an insult to the Assyrians.

Narsai David responded:

They are entitled to their opinion.... We have never said this is a museum-quality reproduction.... We have always said this is a characterization of Ashurbanipal as done by a 20th-century artist. If they choose to think of this as Gilgamesh, they are free to do so.

Maureen (Renee) Kovacs, a Yale Ph.D. who has translated The Epic of Gilgamesh (Stanford U.P., 1989), said the statue depicted neither Ashurbanipal nor Gilgamesh, but rather a Mesopotamian "protective figure, like a guard." Parhad defended the accuracy of his work, while also admitting that he took artistic liberties and attempted to incorporate the various aspects of Assyrian culture, from its hunting mastery to its admiration for writing. He said of the sculpture:

The piece has authentic qualities to it, but it is also my statue.... With the earrings and the clothing and the hair and his daggers, it is Ashurbanipal. But in the choice of (stance), the fact that he is holding a tablet and a lion, that is mine. I wanted myself to be represented in the piece.

== See also ==
- 1988 in art
- Art in the San Francisco Bay Area
- Art of Mesopotamia
- Cultural depictions of lions
- Lamassu
