= Outsider (painting) =

1988 painting by Gordon Bennett

- Artist: Gordon Bennett
- Year: 1988
- Medium: Oil and acrylic on canvas
- Dimensions: 290 cm × 180 cm (110 in × 71 in)

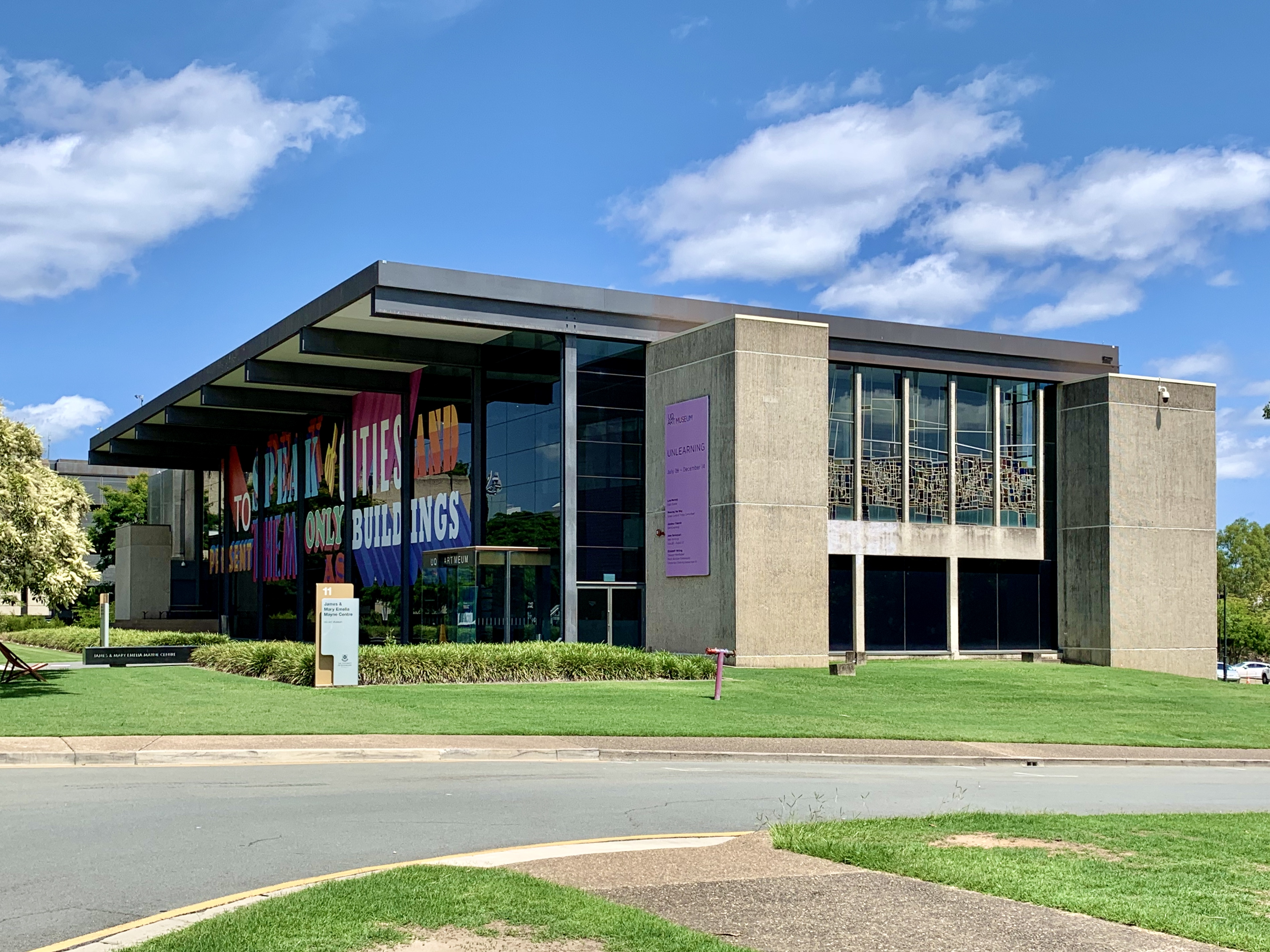
University of Queensland Art Museum

Outsider is a 1988 oil and acrylic painting by post-modern Indigenous Australian artist Gordon Bennett. The painting focuses on issues of the increasing isolation Indigenous Australians feel in their own country, with the date the painting was painted in (1988) being the bicentennial anniversary of white settlement in Australia.

The painting depicts an Indigenous Australian with a severed head along with two classical and sculptural heads and reflects a lone culturally marginal figure who exists outside the social contexts of the mainstream world and art world. Outsider has been appropriated and is intended to be interpreted through the lens of the 'other', otherwise known as those who exist to a subordinate social category under the dominant and westernised culture. It is charged with the feelings of frustration and confusion of Indigenous Australians.

Within this painting Bennett has appropriated famous works of Van Gogh, including Bedroom in Arles (1888) and The Starry Night (1889) and uses the paintings to represent his own life. The interpretation of Outsider varies between critics but is mainly suggested to be reflective of a man divided by the ideology of his upbringing and of his place.

== Description ==
Outsider measures 290 x 180 cm and is published as a collection within the University of Queensland's Art Museum. Bennett's subject is depicted through the central figure of an Indigenous Australian man's decapitated torso in of Van Gogh's Bedroom in Arles (1888) with blood spurting from his gaping neck. The upright torso leans over the yellow-brown bed in Van Gogh's Bedroom in Arles while two white decapitated classical sculptural heads are lolling dumbly on the bed as opposed to the empty bed of Van Gogh's. The walls are covered with red hand marks which are assumed to be the bloodshed of the decapitated figure. Along the top half of the painting, the spurting blood from the neck leads into and blends with the sky which has stylised strokes of Van Gogh's The Starry Night (1889) painted with the same colour scheme but with darker hues of blue, yellow, and black. It is suggested that the dots and dashes in the sky reflect Western Desert Aboriginal 'dot paintings' which is the first instance in which Bennett makes these allusions in his work. These dots provide a connection to Bennett's Indigenous heritage.

== Background ==
'Outsider' is considered an example of Outsider Art and Indigenous Australian Art. Bennett practices Outsider art to represent his experiences as a bi-cultural Australian of both Aboriginal and Anglo-Celtic descent. His painting confronts the idea of cultural identity within his artwork where he has stated that his feelings of alienation are through his Australian education system and the representation of Indigenous Australians in Western culture. Outsider, along with many of Bennett's other works is concerned with exploring Australian's colonial past and postcolonial present. The painting explores issues associated with the dominant role that white, Western culture has played in constructing the social and cultural landscape of the nation. Bennett had painted Outsider during his education at the Queensland College of Art in 1988, his final year. His two electives, Classicism and Aboriginal Art and Culture had heavily influenced Outsider's conception within the same year.

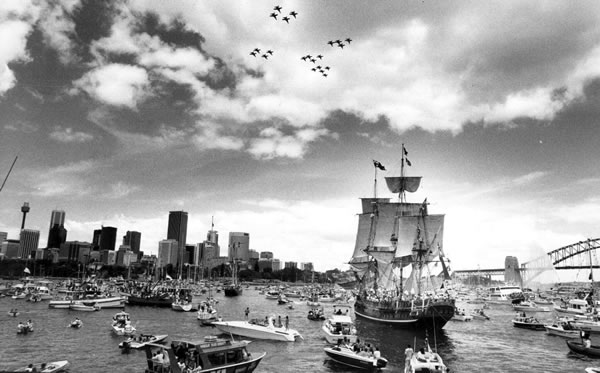
First Fleet Reenactment 1988

The unveiling of trauma was a common subject for Bennett. Outsider avoids the glorification of Australia's history and instead focuses on the depiction of violence to reflect the effects of colonisation. In painting the composition of Outsider during 1988, Bennett attempted to realistically depict the marginal effect of the First Fleet and "to question the way power is exercised (by) disputing claims to domination". He came to learn about Australian history and Indigenous Australians through a Eurocentric bias that had "colonised my mind and body". The Eurocentric perspective was particularly evident for Bennett in the 1988 bicentennial celebrations that had glorified the First Fleet and their pillage. During the 1988 celebrations, Bennett had expressed disapproval in "the grip of bicentennial celebrations that… set out to retrace the journey of the ‘first (European) fleet’ to Australia". Historical events were re-enacted by individuals in period costume and were broadcast on television, commemorated in books and reproduced in magazine. Bennett feared that the romanticised images of ships, danger and adventure faced by the First Fleet were contributing to the reinforcement of Australia's colonial identity through the lens of a selective history and to be deemed as the mainstream. He sought to create a field of disturbance and to necessitate the ‘re-reading’ of Australian history through his painting of Outsider (1988). Critic McLean purports that Outsider could be considered Bennett's unofficial and ironic contribution to Australia's bicentenary celebrations in 1988.

Bennett has intended to portray his main subject within Outsider, Indigenous Australia as victims, a way in which Bennett could come to terms with his own alienating experiences. He sought to display the extent of their pain to the point of self-mutilation rather than portraying a display of resistance or strength in opposition to their colonisation. The decapitated Indigenous Australian figure is looking for a head to replace his missing one and Bennett parallels this process to a "transplantation of culture".

Outsider is one of Bennett's many works that features criticism on Captain James Cook's positioning of Indigenous Australians as 'savages', 'primitives' and therefore as 'ahistorical' which Bennett claims is nothing more than a distorted "mirror reflection of European societies". Bennett expresses a degree of discontent toward 'white' Australia and has stated that it has proven to be a "master of moralising" in his own experiences. Some individuals have come to regard his expression of an Aboriginal point of view as a 'guilt trip' designed to make non-Indigenous Australians feel guilty about Australia's past. In other instances, some have derided his works as existing within the 'guilt industry' and derogatorily denoted as being 'politically correct'.

== Sources of Inspiration ==
Vincent Van Gogh's Bedroom in Arles (1888)

=== Vincent Van Gogh ===
Outsider is one of the first paintings to register Bennett's shift toward a more deconstructive mode. It is a homage and a deconstruction of Vincent Van Gogh's Bedroom in Arles (1888) and The Starry Night (1889).

Outsider was inspired by the 1988 bicentennial anniversary of Australia since the arrival of the first British convict ships. It was also painted in 1988 which marked a centennial anniversary since Van Gogh's Bedroom in Arles in 1888. He describes this coincidental and parallel relationship as a decision to reflect "what was happening in Australia [and] to Van Gogh in his own particular situation". This was to show both the isolation of Indigenous Australians and Van Gogh.

Bennett also drew inspiration from Van Gogh's The Starry Night (1889) and its conception within an asylum. In an interview with Pat Hoffie, Bennett describes this as an interest in the "pain and frustration" of Van Gogh. He articulates a mood of displacement within Outsider through combining the decapitated torso with the spurting blood turning into the spirals of Van Gogh's sky.

Vincent Van Gogh's Starry Night (1889)

By appropriating famous works of Van Gogh, Bennett posits that his painting is inspired and informed by "postmodern deconstruction and… strategies of appropriation" to produce an ironic strategy of ‘history’ paintings. His goal is to draw on the iconographical paradigm of Australia and by extension Europe, to investigate Euro-Australian representation but with a particular focus on Aboriginal people. By recontextualising images Bennett seeks to incite change and to create a "turbulence in the complacent sense of identification with… history" where new possibilities for representation can arise.

=== The grotesque ===
The grotesque inspired Bennett to disrupt the serene quality of colonial images and the complacent acceptance of Australia's glorified history which had untruthfully glamorised and depicted the peaceful settlement of the Australian landscape. Bennett's use of the grotesque is seen within Outsider through a decapitated torso, stained blood and disembodied heads. Bennett specifically quotes Philip Thomson's passage The Critical Idiom: The Grotesque as a source of his inspiration:

The characteristic impact of the grotesque, the shock which it causes, may be used to bewilder
and disorient the spectator, jeopardise or shatter their conventions by opening up onto vertiginous
new perspectives characterised by the deconstruction of logic and regression... thus the spectator
may be jolted out of accustomed ways of perceiving the world and confronted by radically different
and disturbing perspectives .

Bennett has also drawn inspiration from other artists such as Lucio Fontana and his cut canvases which Bennett interprets in a grotesque manner akin to mutilation. His inspiration for the depictions of spurting blood is also sourced through Aboriginal funeral ceremonies in which ritualised public displays of grief and mourning can involve blood-letting and the cutting of one own's body.

== Interpretations and symbolism ==
Outsider opens interpretations to a broad range of philosophical ideas related to the construction of identity and perception through Bennett's experiences of Australia's colonial past and postcolonial present. Critics of Bennett's work, Bob Lingard and Fazal Rizvi interpret that Bennett fragments historical images and recontextualises them in order to nuance postcolonial possibilities. This is in line with Bennett's purpose to deconstruct Eurocentric conditioning which is seen within Outsider.

Hugh Ramsey Chair of Australian Art History, Ian McLean expands on Bennett's appropriations by calling Outsider a "metaphysical quest for meaning and identity". Outsider could be interpreted in such a way that the decapitated figure could symbolise either Bennett or Van Gogh. Professor of philosophy, Melvin Rader has commented on the manifestoes of recent (art) schools and expresses how those within, such as Van Gogh, face feelings of "opposition and estrangement" as well as "madness and suicide" which is what Bennett sought to explore and display within his painting of Outsider. Though Van Gogh was an outsider to the art world, Bennett's decapitated figure is an outsider to his own country of origin and upbringing. Outsider reflects Van Gogh's realistic and humble "self-portrait full of prophecy and psychoanalytical premonitions". However Bennett's own appropriation is a violent ritual rather than Van Gogh's one of tense calmness, which McLean claims is "transparently staged, his mutilation is a public theatre rather than a private act of desperation". It is a blatantly shocking visualisation of the trauma which Van Gogh's Bedroom in Arles only symbolises and keeps invisible. According to Ian McLean, Bennett identified with Van Gogh's own tortured life and had a compulsion to show the "darkness in light"- where Van Gogh's work had been "interrupted by madness", Bennett's Outsider "interrupts the madness of the world" in order to reframe the role of identity in self-portraiture.

The walls of the room are occasionally spattered with red hand marks which artist Adam Gezcy interprets to be "the most venerable Aboriginal sign of both presence and absence". He suggests that it is a harrowing and an "audacious work that places the pain of the Aboriginal peoples at the centre of the West's own mythologies". Bennett deconstructs the history of Australian colonialism and is understood by Gezcy as an artistic form of ‘payback’ and the Aboriginal version of ‘eye for an eye’- rather than being combative in nature, Outsider seeks to find a middle ground of redemption and peace. Another critic, Art Historian Jeanette Hoorn suggests that Van Gogh's Bedroom at Arles and The Starry Night are "modern icons of Europeanness" and are objects of admiration by cultures of the West which Bennett appropriates against "black memories of violence and mutilation". The mutilation is interpreted to be an allusion toward bounty hunters in early colonial Australia who decapitated black men in exchange for money in Europe. Bolstering her claim are the spirals in Bennett's own 'Starry Night' which are interpreted to be a gruesome reference to the vanishing of Indigenous Australian culture. The spurting blood from the neck of the Indigenous Australian has assimilated into and has been replaced by the culture of the West's 'Starry Night' which Hoorn suggests is reinforced by the "representation of classical statuary" in the painting.

== Reception ==
In an exhibition at the inaugural Adelaide Biennial of Australian Art in 1990 Bennett was subjected to a racist verbal attack in an Adelaide restaurant by a woman who "could not handle" his painting.

Within an art program, Painting: [Traces of Place] between Bennett and Pat Hoffie, Pat describes it as a violent image but one which has a sense of rightness. She praises Bennett's work as being "informed by history, by politics, by a whole number of subjects".
