= Efim Liberman =

Russian biophysicist and physiologist

- Ефим Либерман
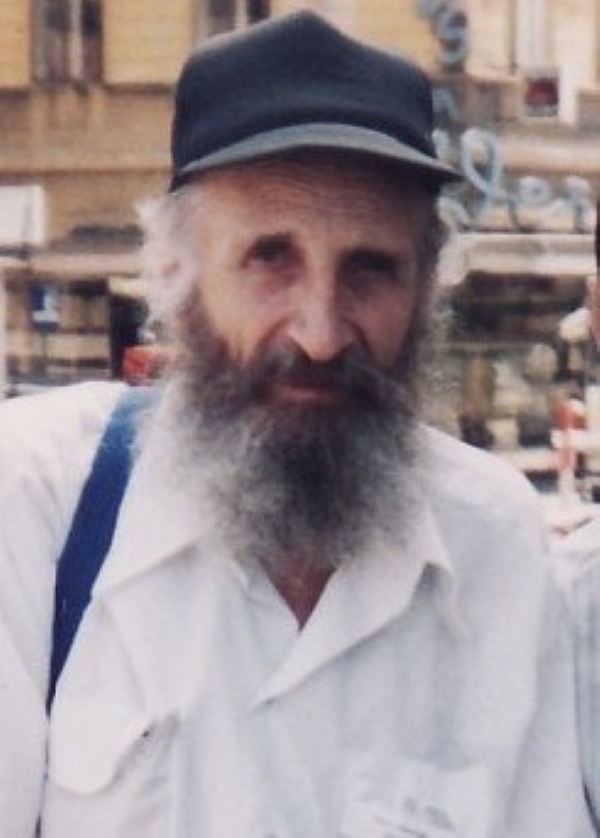
- Efim Liberman in Vienna in June 1996 at the Conference on the Foundations of Information Science
- Born: Efim Arsentievich Liberman; 1 February 1925; Moscow, USSR
- Died: 3 September 2011 (aged 86); Jerusalem, Israel
- Citizenship: Soviet Union, Israel
- Education: Moscow State University
- Spouse: Svetlana Minina
- Children: 9
- Scientific career
- Workplaces: Soviet Academy of Sciences
- Website: https://www.efim.liberman.net/

Efim Arsentievich Liberman (February 1, 1925, Moscow – September 3, 2011, Jerusalem). Soviet and Russian biophysicist and physiologist, winner of the USSR State Prize (1975).

== Biography ==
Born into the family of the agronomist Azriil Alterovich Liberman (b. 1885), a native of Suwalki, Poland, and mathematics teacher Sima Khaimovna Izrael (b. 1895), a native of Bialystok, Poland. From 1943 he fought in the Great Patriotic War as an assistant commander of a rifle platoon of the 31st Guards Rifle Division (Bryansk Front). Efim was seriously wounded during the war, and was awarded the For Valour medal for personal courage and bravery in battle.

Efim Liberman graduated from the Moscow State University's Physics Department in 1949. He worked as a radio engineer at Design Bureau No. 1, and in 1951 he joined the Elemental Electric Coal Institute as a senior engineer. In 1953 he held a junior researcher position at the Institute of Roentgenology and Radiology.

From 1955 to 1967 he worked as a researcher at the USSR Academy of Sciences' (now Russian Academy of Sciences) Institute of Biophysics. From 1967 to 2006 he was a researcher at the USSR Academy of Sciences' Institute for Information Transmission Problems, becoming a chief researcher in 1994.

In 1975, alongside V.P. Skulachev, L.M. Tsofina, and A. Yasaitis, he was awarded the USSR State Prize for a series of works studying molecular generators and electric current transformers.

In 1959 he was awarded the title Candidate in Physical and Mathematical Sciences. In 1963 he received a doctoral degree in Biological Sciences.

Efim Liberman proposed the idea of a molecular computer as a cellular function (Cytomolecular Computing, 1972) and, alongside Svetlana Minina, he developed the idea of the brain as a quantum molecular computer that processes information at the intracellular level. According to Liberman, natural computation is realized via the programs associated with the DNA and RNA nucleotide sequences and accomplished by the corresponding enzymes acting as processing units that operate upon these nucleotide sequences representing the addresses and commands.

Based on these ideas, he developed a unitary theory of physical and biological sciences.

== Family ==
Efim Liberman's first wife was Varvara Viktorovna Shklovskaya-Kordi (b. 1927), a physicist and daughter of the writer Viktor Shklovsky. His son from his first marriage, Nikita Efimovich Shklovsky-Kordi (b. 1952) is a Сandidate of Biological Sciences, physiologist, and a leading researcher at the Russian Health Ministry's Hematology Research Centre.

His second wife was Elena Borisovna Vershilova (b. 1937), daughter of theater director and teacher Boris Ilyich Vershilov (Westerman). They had two sons, Mikhail and Petr (Azriel).

Efim's third wife was Svetlana Vladimirovna Minina, a biophysicist and physiologist. They had six children, including daughters Anna (b. 1981) and Maria (b. 1978), sons Daniil (b. 1982), David (b. 1984), and Gavriil. David and Daniil produced the TV show Mult Lichnosti on Channel One Russia, which aired from 2009 to 2013. They are entrepreneurs and founders of the venture capital fund Brothers Ventures and Frank.Money in the US.
