= The Blind Contessa's New Machine =

Historical fiction novel by Carey Wallace

The Blind Contessa's New Machine is a historical fiction novel written by Carey Wallace and published by Pamela Dorman Books. The story is based on Pellegrino Turri and his relationship with the countess Carolina Fantoni, which inspired the invention of one of the first typewriters.

== Background ==
The Blind Contessa's New Machine is a historical fiction novel written by Carey Wallace and published by Viking Press imprint Pamela Dorman Books. The book focuses on the relationship between Carolina Fantoni and Pellegrino Turri in 19th-century Fivizzano, Italy. Shortly before Fantoni marries a man named Pietro, she discovers that she is slowly going blind. However, her husband and her family don't believe her; Fantoni's neighbor, Turri, is the only one who does believe her. Turri invents one of the first typewriters so that Fantoni can continue to write letters once her vision has completely faded, which leads to an affair between the two. However, Turri is over a decade older than her and is also married.

The book explores the theme of beauty in the natural world within the context of blindness. As the protagonist goes blind the physical landscape around her fades, but she continues enjoying the beauty of the world through her imagination. For instance, reading books with her maid.

The book was translated into Italian by Nicoletta Grill. The title of the translated work is "Le parole perdute". The book was also translated into French with the title "La comtesse et les ombres".

== See also ==
- Stories of the Saints
- The Ghost in the Glass House
