= The Ghost in the Glass House =

Historical fiction novel

The Ghost in the Glass House is a historical fiction novel written by Carey Wallace that was published by Clarion Books on September 3, 2013. The story is set in 1920s New England and follows Clare Fitzgerald as she investigates the past of a ghost named Jack whom she meets in a glass house.

== Background ==
The 240-page novel written by Carey Wallace was published by Houghton Mifflin imprint Clarion Books on September 3, 2013. The story is set in 1920s New England. The protagonist of the story is Clare Fitzgerald, who meets a ghost named Jack in a glass house in a seaside town. After Clare's father died three years earlier, her mother has avoided returning to their home in New York by travelling from place to place. Clare's mother begins an affair with the father of Clare's best friend Bridget. The other children living in the town have wealthy parents who have essentially abandoned them and as a result they are cruel to each other as well as Clare. The glass house where Clare meets Jack is maintained by an obstinate housekeeper who is unwilling to tell Clare what she knows about the place. Jack doesn't remember his past and doesn't want to, however, Clare is determined to discover Jack's identity.

== See also ==
- Stories of the Saints
- The Blind Contessa's New Machine
