= M. Charles Liberman =

American medical academic

Michael Charles Liberman (July 17, 1950) was born to Alvin Liberman and Isabelle Liberman in Storrs, Connecticut. He is now Director of the Eaton-Peabody Laboratory at the Massachusetts Eye and Ear Infirmary in Boston, and Harold Schuknecht Professor of Otology and Laryngology and Health Sciences and Technology at Harvard Medical School. He is a past president of the Association for Research in Otolaryngology.

His research is concerned with the physiology and anatomy of the auditory nerve and cochlear efferent innervation, as well as noise-induced cochlear pathology; he has published over 100 peer-reviewed papers in these areas. He supervises several graduate students from the Harvard-MIT Speech and Hearing Bioscience and Technology Ph.D. program, as well as post-docs' and residents' research projects.

== Education ==
Liberman received his AB in Biology from Harvard University in 1972 and went on to receive his Ph.D. in physiology from Harvard University in 1976.
