= Pellegrino Turri =

Italian inventor

Pellegrino Turri (1765–1828), an Italian inventor, invented a mechanical typing machine, one of the first typewriters, at the start of the 19th century (conflicting accounts suggest 1801, 1806 or 1808) for his blind friend Countess Carolina Fantoni da Fivizzano. He also invented carbon paper to provide the ink for his machine.

According to another version, the machine was invented in 1802 by Agostino Fantoni from Fivizzano, nephew of the Italian poet Labindo, to help his blind sister, while Turri merely improved Fantoni's machine and invented the carbon paper in 1806.

Although not much is known about the machine, some of the letters written on it by the countess have survived. The 2010 novel The Blind Contessa's New Machine by Carey Wallace is based on their story, although it is a semi fictional account which portrays them as lovers despite the surviving letters making no reference to any affair.

The letters address Turri as "my dear friend", and discuss her progress in learning to use the device.
