= Isabelle Liberman =

American psychologist (died 1990)

- Born: Isabelle Yoffe; Latvia
- Died: July 19, 1990 (aged 71); Mansfield Center, Connecticut, U.S.
- Education: Vassar College (BA); Yale University (PhD)
- Occupations: Psychologist; educator
- Spouse: Alvin Liberman (m. 1941)
- Children: 3, including Mark and Charles

Isabelle Liberman (née Yoffe; died July 19, 1990) was an American psychologist.

== Early life ==
Liberman was born Isabelle Yoffe in Latvia to Tema (née Levin) and Jacob Yoffe. Her mother was born in Russia. At the age of two, she came with her family to the United States. She received a Bachelor of Arts from Vassar College in 1939 and a PhD from Yale University. She was a research assistant in the Institute of Human Relations at Yale.

== Career ==
In 1966, Liberman joined the University of Connecticut and retired in 1987. In 1988, she received the Samuel T. Orton Award of the Orton Dyslexic Society for her contributions to the wider understanding of reading disabilities. She was a research associate at Haskins Laboratories in New Haven, which was associated with both Yale and the University of Connecticut. Along with her husband, Alvin Liberman, she elucidated the "alphabetic principle" and its relationship to phonemic awareness and phonological awareness in reading.

== Personal life ==
She married Alvin Liberman, son of Max Liberman, on June 1, 1941. They had two sons and one daughter, Mark, Charles and Sarah. Liberman died of heart failure on July 19, 1990, aged 71, at her home in Mansfield Center, Connecticut.

Her son Mark is Trustee Professor of Phonetics and Professor of Computer and Information Sciences at the University of Pennsylvania. Her son Charles is Professor of Otology and Laryngology at Harvard Medical School. Her daughter, Sarah Ash, is an Associate Professor of Nutrition in the Department of Food, Bioprocessing, and Nutrition Sciences at North Carolina State University.

== Selected publications ==
- Susan A. Brady and Donald Shankweiler (eds.). (1991) Phonological Processes in Literacy: A Tribute To Isabelle Y. Liberman. Lawrence Erlbaum Associates. 1991
- Liberman, I. Y. (1973) Segmentation of the Spoken Word and Reading Acquisition. Bulletin of the Orton Society, XXIII, 65-77.
- Liberman, Isabelle Y., Donald Shankweiler, F. William Fischer and Bonnie Carter (1974). Explicit syllable and phoneme segmentation in the young child. Journal of Experimental Child Psychology 18 (2), 201-212.
- Liberman, I.Y., Shankweiler, D., Camp, L., Blachman, B., & Werfelman, M. (1979). Steps toward literacy: A linguistic approach. In Resnick L., Weaver, P.(eds.): Theory and practice of early reading, Vol. 2. Hillsdale, NJ. Erlbaum Associates.
- Liberman, I., Liberman, A. M., Mattingly, I. & Shankweiler, D. (1980). Orthography and the Beginning Reader. In J.F. Kavanagh & R.L. Venezky (eds.) Orthography, Reading, and Dyslexia. University Park Press: Baltimore. pp. 137–153.
- Liberman, I. Y. and Shankweiler, D. (1985) Phonology and the problems of learning to read and write. In Topical Issue (I. Y. Liberman, Guest Editor), Remedial and Special Education, 6(6), 8-17.
- Liberman, Isabelle Y. & Shankweiler, Donald. (1987) Phonology and the problems of learning to read and write. Memory and Learning Disabilities. Advances in Learning and Behavioral Disabilities, Suppl. 2, 203- 224.
- Liberman, I. Y. (1987) Language and Literacy: The Obligation of the Schools of Education. In W. Ellis (Ed.), Intimacy with language: A forgotten basic in teacher education. Baltimore: The Orton Dyslexia Society, 1-9.
- Liberman, I. Y., Shankweiler, D., & Liberman, A. M. (1990). The Alphabetic Principle and Learning to Read. In D. Shankweiler & I. Y. Liberman (Eds.), Phonology and Reading Disability: Solving the Reading Puzzle. (1989). IARLD Research Monograph Series. Ann Arbor: University of Michigan Press.
