= Fred Parhad =

Assyrian sculptor

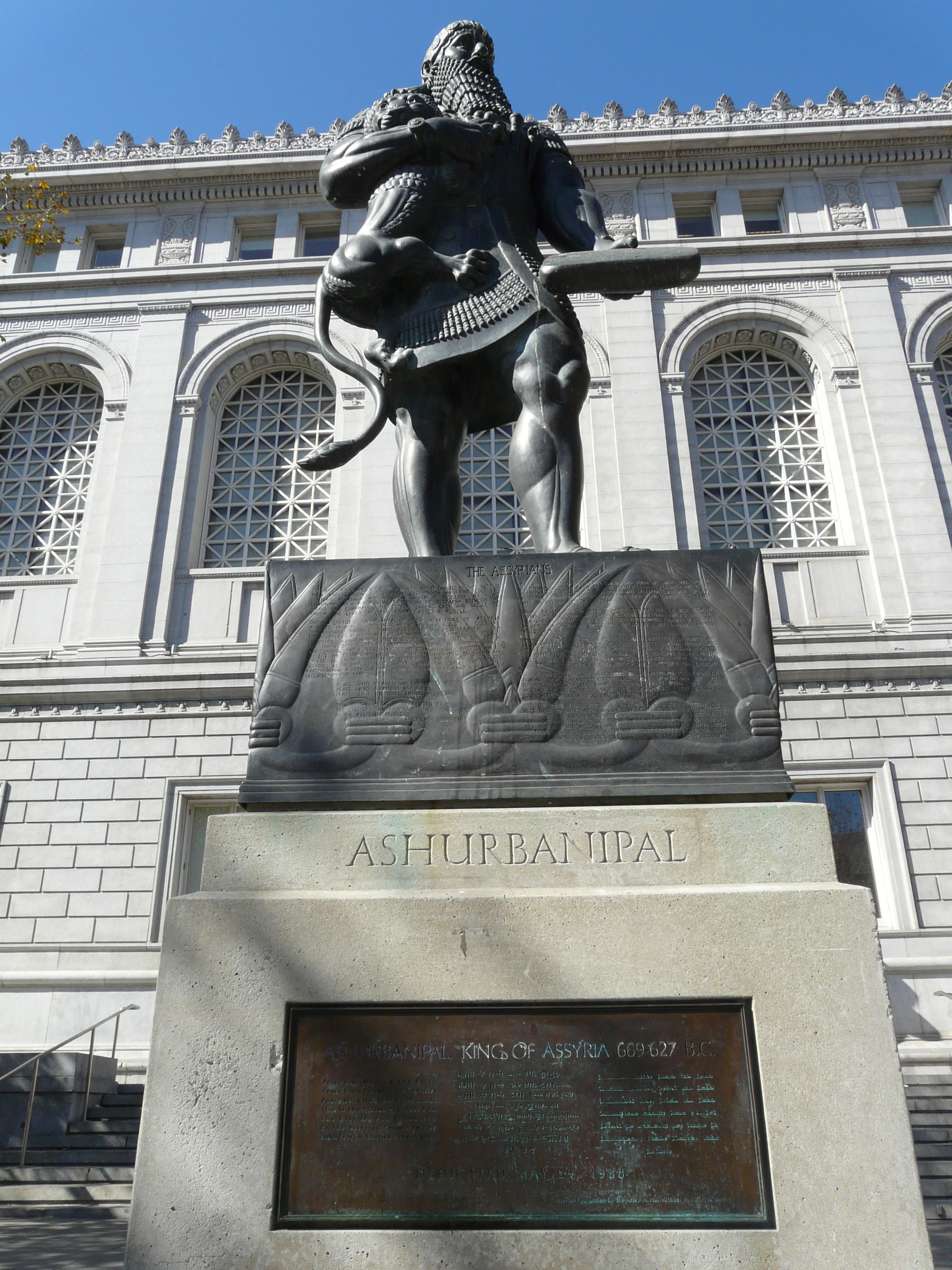
- Statue Of Ashurbanipal in San Francisco, by Fred Parhad
- Born: 1947 (age 78–79); Baghdad, Kingdom of Iraq
- Known for: Sculptor
- Website: fredparhad.com

Fred Parhad (born 1947) is an Iraqi-Assyrian sculptor who is best known for his monument of Ashurbanipal, which stands in San Francisco in front of that city's Asian Art Museum. Parhad is a self-taught sculptor, who, at the beginning of his career, focused on the art of ancient Assyria.

== The statue of Ashurbanipal ==
The statue of the Assyrian King, Ashurbanipal, looks across Fulton Street towards the San Francisco Public Library. The king is sculpted in a short tunic. He holds a lion cub to his chest with his right arm and offers a clay tablet with his left. A bronze plaque and rosettes adorn the concrete base of the statue. The clay tablet held by the king is inscribed with Assyrian cuneiform, whose text translates as:

"Peace unto heaven and earth

Peace unto countries and cities

Peace unto the dwellers in all lands"

Ashurbanipal, son of Esarhaddon, was the last great king of the Neo-Assyrian Empire (668 BC–c. 627 BC). He introduced the first known systematically organized library, the Library of Ashurbanipal, now at Nineveh. This library was burned along with most of the city of Nineveh; however, the flames served to fire some of the clay tablets. This accidental vitrification is the ultimate reason for the survival of the king's name and deeds.

== Biography ==
Parhad was born in Baghdad in 1947. Due to the Assyrian genocide just before World War I, his grandfather, Dr. Baba Parhad, moved four generations of his family abroad. Fred Parhad spent his younger days in Iraq, Iran and Kuwait, where his father, Dr. Luther Parhad, held directorships in the public health sector.

Parhad had a keen interest in sculpture from his early days and pursued this through high school and further, while studying at University of California, Berkeley. Sculpture became a career after he moved to New York in 1976.
