= Joseph Liberman =

Soviet mathematician

Joseph Liberman (1917 in Henichesk – August 1941 in Russian: Иосиф Меерович Либерман) was a Soviet mathematician, a student of Aleksandrov, best known for Liberman's lemma.

== Biography ==
In 1936 he entered Leningrad State University as one of the winners of the first city Mathematical Olimpiad.

He worked in geometry and real analysis. In 1938 he published his first paper. In 1939 he entered graduate school.

He served in the army since June 1941. He defended Ph.D. thesis in June 1941. At this time he was already lieutenant of Navy anti-aircraft warfare.

In August 1941 he was sent to Tallinn, Estonia where he died.

Three geometric papers of Liberman appeared in 1941 and another in 1943.

== See also ==
- Liberman's lemma
