= National Medical Research Centre for Hematology =

Medical Research Facility

The National Medical Research Centre for Hematology is a medical research institute in Moscow funded by the Ministry of Health of the Russian Federation. The Research Centre includes the Research Institute of Hematology and Intensive Care, Research Institute of Bone Marrow Transplantation and Molecular Hematology and the A.A. Bogdanov Research Institute of Blood Transfusion.

It was established in 1926 as Institute for Blood Transfusion. The first director was Alexander Bogdanov, who died in two years during one of experiment on rejuvenation. After this event, Alexander Bogomolets became the second head of the institute and continued that line of research.
