= Eldon Garnet =

Canadian artist and author

- Born: 1946 (age 79–80); Toronto, Ontario

Eldon Garnet (born 1946) is a multidisciplinary artist and novelist based in Toronto, Ontario and a professor at the Ontario College of Art and Design. From 1975 to 1990 he was the editor of Impulse, a Canadian magazine of art and culture.

== Career ==
Garnet was born in Toronto, Ontario. His first solo show was in Toronto at A Space in 1975. Surveys of Garnet's sculptures and photographic work have been held at the National Gallery of Canada, the Museum of Contemporary Canadian Art and the Amsterdam Center of Photography. His first novel, Reading Brooke Shields: The Garden of Failure was published by Semiotext(e), in 1995. Impulse Archaeology, a collection of articles from his years as editor at Impulse magazine (1975-1990), was released by the University of Toronto Press in 2005. His novel Lost Between the Edges was published by Semiotext(e), MIT. His recent novel, Categories of Disappearance is available from impulseb.com. He is also known for his public art works including Little Glenn and Memorial to Commemorate the Chinese Railroad Workers in Canada located in Toronto. Eldon is represented by the Christopher Cutts Gallery Toronto and Torch Gallery, Amsterdam.

== Little Glenn ==
Little Glenn is Garnet's human-size bronze statue of a young working-class boy pulling a 22-foot-tall (6.7 m) stone obelisk in a four-wheeled cart. On the obelisk are carved the words "To serve and protect", the motto of the police force of Toronto, Ontario, Canada.

Little Glenn is located on the intersection of Bay and Grenville, in front of the Metro Toronto Police Headquarters. It was erected in 1988 as a part of a composition of three human-size sculptures by Garnet surrounding the police station.
