= Daniil and David Liberman =

Businessmen brothers

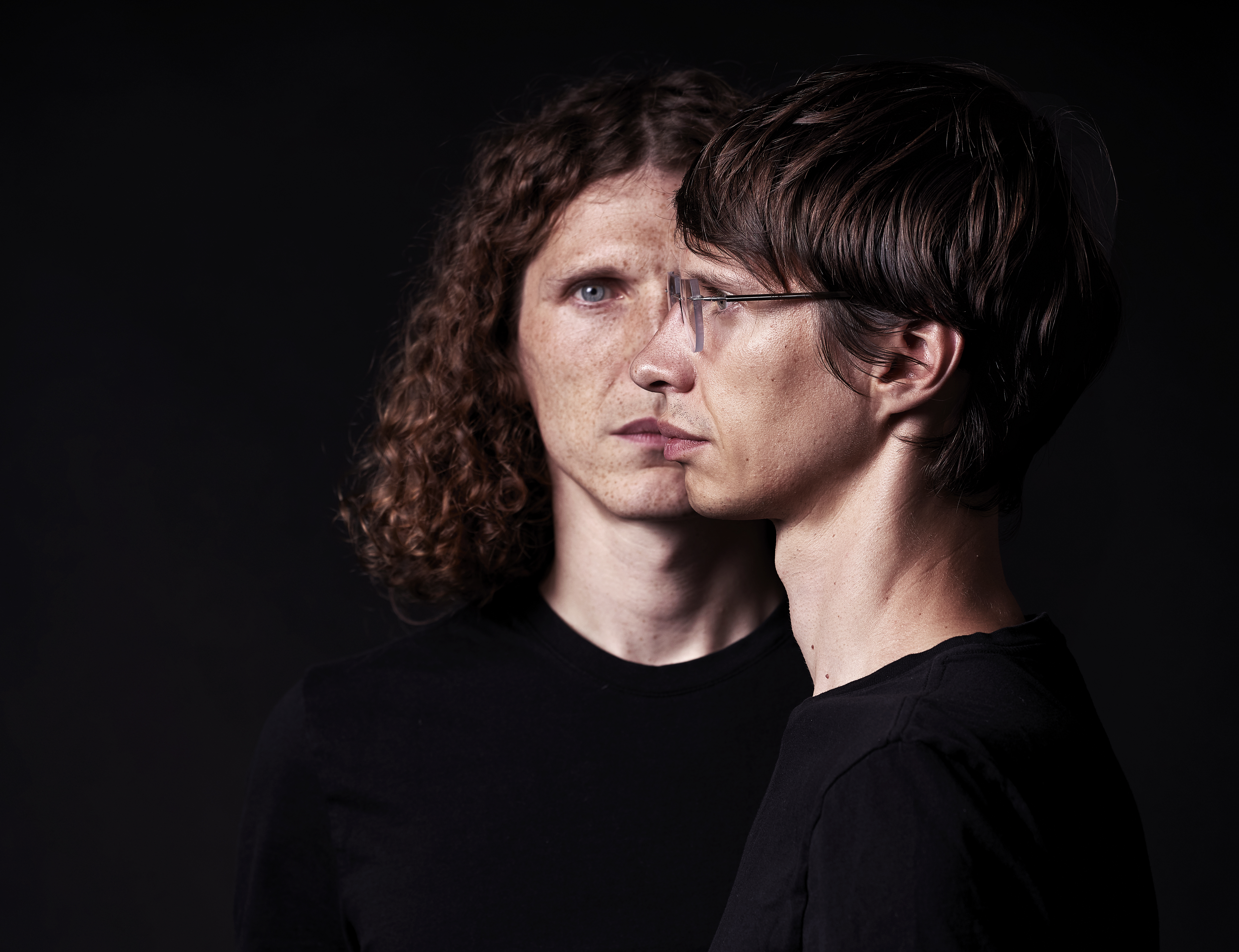
- Brothers Liberman
- Born: Daniil and David Liberman; 21 December 1982 (age 43); 22 February 1984 (age 42); Moscow, Soviet Union
- Occupations: Serial entrepreneurs; businessmen; investors
- Known for: Snapchat, Libermans Co, Product Science, Human, Humanism, Kernel AR, Frank.Money, Brothers Ventures, Reveality Ventures, Concept Space, Kanobu, Sibilant Interactive
- Parents: Efim Arsentievich Liberman; Svetlana Vladimirovna Minina
- Website: libermans.co

Brothers Daniil and David Liberman are serial entrepreneurs, businessmen, and investors. They have founded and cofounded Libermans Co, Product Science, Human, Humanism, Sibilant Interactive, Kanobu Concept Space, Kernel AR, Reveality Ventures, Brothers Ventures, and the start-up Frank.Money. They created the TV show Mult Lichnosti, and were directors of product at Snapchat.

== Biography ==
Daniil was born on December 21, 1982, and David was born on February 22, 1984. Their father Efim Arsentievich Liberman (1925-2011) was a biophysicist and physiologist, and a USSR State Prize laureate. Their mother Svetlana Vladimirovna Minina (born 1950 in Moscow, USSR) worked as a biophysicist and physiologist. They are two of six siblings.

Daniil and David studied in the same class at the Moscow National Jewish School No. 1311. They continued studying together thereafter, graduating from the Maimonides State Classical Academy (formerly the Moscow Jewish Academy), each with a degree in Mathematics and Computer Science. Their sisters Anna and Maria Liberman participate actively in all of their projects.

== Entrepreneurial activity ==
Daniil and David began earning money while still at school, fixing computers and creating websites.

They wrote their first video game business plan in 2001. In 2005 they founded Sibilant Interactive, which specialized in massively multiplayer online role-playing games. The project was shut due to the 2008 financial crisis. The brothers were also co-founders of Kanobu, which was previously released as a separate project from Sibilant Interactive. In 2011, a controlling stake in Kanobu Network was acquired by Rambler&Co.

In 2008, together with Anna and Maria, the brothers registered the new company Concept Space. They used the high-quality computer graphics expertise they had gained while developing video games to create their own proprietary software as well as a cost-effective pipeline for producing CGI animation and motion capture technology.

In 2009, Daniil and David signed a contract with Channel One Russia to create the animated cartoon series Mult Lichnosti, which aired from November 15 2009 to February 24, 2013. The brothers were involved in business development and innovation, Maria specialized in legal support and content management, while Anna, alongside her partner Dmitry Azadov (author of the Russian 3D animated series Dyatlows), oversaw production. In 2010, Anna and Dmitry were awarded the TEFI Prize in the TV Program Art Directors category.

In 2010, David and Daniil created the company Brothers Ventures. The firm's largest deal was with Coub, in which it invested around $1 million.

In 2015, the brothers moved to the US and founded the startup Frank.Money, which provides a widget for visualizing expenses and income for both non-profit organizations and companies. The widget helps donors and members of the global community see in real time how the project founder is spending the funds raised. The project is related directly to the brothers’ mission to make the world and organizations more transparent.

In 2018, the Frank Foundation announced a competition for a grant in the field of educational technology. The Hack Club won the $1 million grant in 2019, accepting the terms of full transparency regarding subsequent expenses and income. In May 2020, Elon Musk donated $500,000 to the Hack Club.

In July 2016, Maria, Anna, Daniil, and David founded Kernel AR. The company, which built advanced technologies for Avatars in augmented reality, was acquired by Snap Inc in October 2016. The brothers are members of Snapchat's creative team

In 2021, Daniil and David left Snapchat to pursue their entrepreneurial journey.

In 2025, David and Daniel founded GonkaAI, they publicly told about it in an interview House of ZK in October 2025. The company is engaged in the construction of a system decentralized computing for the organization and training of neural networks. The project works on the principle of mining of cryptocurrencies, while, according to the brothers, the GonkaAI token - GNK, will be of much more value, since the computing power for its formation is spent on the work of specific neural networks.
