= Mark Liberman =

American linguist

- Born: Mark Yoffe Liberman

Academic background
- Education: Massachusetts Institute of Technology (MS, PhD)
- Thesis: The intonational system of English (1975)
- Doctoral advisor: Morris Halle
- Influences: Alvin Liberman (father); Isabelle Liberman (mother)

Academic work
- Institutions: University of Pennsylvania, Bell Laboratories

Mark Yoffe Liberman /ˈlɪbərmən/ is an American linguist. He is Christopher H. Browne Distinguished Professor of Linguistics at the University of Pennsylvania, with a dual appointment as Professor in the Department of Computer and Information Science. He is the founding director of the Linguistic Data Consortium and Faculty Director of Ware College House.

== Early life ==
Liberman is the son of psychologists Alvin Liberman and Isabelle Liberman.

Mark Liberman attended Harvard College but did not graduate. After two years' service in the US Army in Vietnam, he enrolled in graduate school in linguistics at MIT, from which he received a Master of Science (1972) and a PhD (1975).

== Career ==
From 1975 to 1990, he was a Member of Technical Staff at Bell Laboratories.

== Research ==
Liberman's main research interests lie in phonetics, prosody, and other aspects of speech communication. His early research established the linguistic subfield of metrical phonology. Much of his current research is conducted through computational analyses of linguistic corpora. In 2017, Liberman was the recipient of the IEEE James L. Flanagan Speech and Audio Processing Award.

Liberman is a founding co-editor of the Annual Review of Linguistics. Liberman is also the founder of (and frequent contributor to) Language Log, a blog with a broad cast of dozens of professional linguists. The concept of the eggcorn was first proposed in one of his posts there.

== Mobile phones and endangered languages ==
In 2012, Liberman and Steven Bird began a US$101,501 project "to use mobile telephones to collect larger amounts of data on undocumented endangered languages than would ever be possible through usual fieldwork." The project resulted in the mobile app Aikuma.

== Books ==
- Liberman, Mark; Pullum, Geoffrey K. (2006). Far from the Madding Gerund: and Other Dispatches from the Language Log. William, James, and Co. ISBN 1-59028-055-5.
