= Liberman's lemma =

Liberman's lemma is a theorem used in studying intrinsic geometry of convex surface. It is named after Joseph Liberman.

== Formulation ==
If $\gamma$ is a unit-speed minimizing geodesic on the surface of a convex body K in Euclidean space then for any point p ∈ K, the function

$$t\mapsto\operatorname{dist}^2\circ\gamma(t)-t^2$$

is concave.
