= Judith Weinshall Liberman =

Israeli artist (born 1929)

- יהודית ויינשל ליברמן
- Born: 1929 (age 96–97); Haifa, Mandatory Palestine
- Education: University of Chicago Law School (JD); University of Michigan Law School (LLM); School of Practical Art; School of the Museum of Fine Arts, Boston; DeCordova Museum School; Boston University College of Fine Arts; Massachusetts College of Art and Design
- Known for: Holocaust Wall Hangings

Judith Weinshall Liberman (Hebrew: יהודית ויינשל ליברמן; born 1929) is an Israeli artist who is known for the Holocaust Wall Hangings, a series of sixty loose-hanging fabric banners of varying sizes created between 1988 and 2002 depicting the plight of the Jewish people and other minorities during the Holocaust of World War II.

== Early life ==
Judith Weinshall Liberman was born in 1929 and grew up in Haifa, Mandatory Palestine (present-day Israel) during the years of the Holocaust. In 1947, she moved to America to attend college and received four American university degrees including a J.D. degree from the University of Chicago Law School and an LL.M. degree from the University of Michigan Law School. In 1956, she turned her attention to the arts and began studying drawing, painting, sculpture, and other art mediums at the School of Practical Art, the School of the Museum of Fine Arts, the DeCordova Museum School, the Boston University College of Fine Arts and the Massachusetts College of Art and Design.

== Critical response to work ==
Judith Weinshall Liberman's Holocaust Wall Hangings have been recognized by publications and institutions such as The New York Times, NBC News, the Holocaust Teacher Resource Center, the Tampa Bay Times and the Cleveland Jewish News. Helen A. Harrison of the New York Times states that within the Holocaust Wall Hangings, "Abstraction and repetition are applied to the symbolism of repression, removing it from the realm of personal suffering and elevating it to the level of universal tragedy." Ori Soltes, art and theology teacher at Georgetown University and former director of the B'nai B'rith Klutznick National Jewish Museum in Washington, D.C., believes that the soft materials Weinshall Liberman uses in her work "provide an important contrast to the Holocaust tragedy." Soltes says, "Using that kind of material for something which is so harsh and hard-edged to my mind is sort of an interesting conceptual leap." In her article "Powerful Works on Fabric a Tribute to Holocaust," critic Fran Heller of the Cleveland Jewish News notes that "Liberman's color palette of red, gray and black symbolizes blood and fire, suffering, despair and death (and) it is both forceful and aesthetically moving."

== Archives ==
The Judith Weinshall Liberman Papers, 1960–2003, a collection of photographs, slides, videos and manuscripts of panel discussions and exhibition installations relating to the Holocaust Wall Hangings, has been catalogued by the Smithsonian Institution's Archives of American Art. Weinshall Liberman's book Holocaust Wall Hangings (2002), a companion piece to the wall hanging collection, has been digitally archived in the Fine Arts Department at the Boston Public Library.
