= Gordon Bennett (artist) =

Australian artist (1955–2014)

- Born: 9 October 1955; Monto, Queensland, Australia
- Died: 3 June 2014 (aged 58); Brisbane, Queensland, Australia
- Education: Queensland College of Art
- Known for: Painting, printmaking
- Movement: Urban indigenous art
- Awards: Moët & Chandon Australian Art Fellowship (1991); John McCaughey Memorial Art Prize (1997)

Gordon Bennett (9 October 1955 – 3 June 2014) was an Birri Gubba and Darumbal artist of Aboriginal and Anglo-Celtic descent. Born in Monto, Queensland, Bennett was a significant figure in contemporary Indigenous Australian art.

== Early life ==
Born in Monto, Queensland, in 1955, of Anglo-Celtic and Aboriginal ancestry, Gordon Bennett grew up in Victoria from the age of four, when his family moved back to Queensland, to the town of Nambour. He attended Nambour State High School. He left school at fifteen and worked in a variety of trades before undertaking formal art studies at the Queensland College of Art, Brisbane between 1986 and 1988.

== Career ==
Some of his work is about what he saw when he was young. His 1991 painting Nine Ricochets won the prestigious Moët & Chandon Australian Art Fellowship, and he rapidly established himself as a leading figure in the Australian art world. Bennett lived and worked in Brisbane, where he created paintings, prints and worked in multi-media.

In 2004, Bennett, together with Peter Robinson, had a two-person exhibition Three Colours, which showed at several Victorian art galleries including Heide Museum of Modern Art, Shepparton Art Gallery, Bendigo Art Gallery and the Ballarat Fine Art Gallery. In late 2007 he had a solo exhibition at the National Gallery of Victoria, that set his works on colonialism in an international context.

Selected solo exhibitions include: Outsider / Insider: The Art of Gordon Bennett, The Aboriginal Art Museum, Utrecht, The Netherlands, (2012); Gordon Bennett: a survey, National Gallery of Victoria, Melbourne (2007), and touring to Queensland Art Gallery, Brisbane and Art Gallery of Western Australia, Perth; The Expiation of Guilt, Museum of Archaeology and Anthropology, University of Cambridge, UK (2007); History and Memory in the Art of Gordon Bennett, Brisbane City Gallery (1999), and touring to Ikon Gallery, Birmingham, UK; Arnolfini, Bristol, UK; Henie Onstad Kunstsenter, Norway.

In 2017, his work featured in the group exhibition In the future everything will be as certain as it used to be at Framer Framed, Amsterdam, The Netherlands.

Bennett exhibited his work in biennales in numerous cities, including Sydney, Venice, Gwangju, Shanghai, Prague and Berlin.

== Views ==
Bennett expressed his discomfort with being seen as spokesman for Aboriginal peoples, and in a manifesto (or 'manifest toe' as he called it) published in 1996 he spoke of his wish "to avoid banal containment as a professional Aborigine, which both misrepresents me and denies my upbringing and Scottish/English heritage," while simultaneously expressing his wish that his young daughter could grow up in a society where her life would not be defined by her race. The confrontation of Australian racism is a regular theme in works by Bennett.

== Death ==
Gordon Bennett died in Brisbane on 3 June 2014, of natural causes. He was 58.

== Legacy ==
Judith Ryan, senior curator from the National Gallery of Victoria in 2004 described Bennett as "an artist's artist" and "like no other artist currently working". Noting the influence of Jackson Pollock, Piet Mondrian and Basquiat, she considered Bennett's style to be theoretical and confronting, and intended to encourage critical reflection on national identity.

Bennett is represented in most major public collections in Australia, including the Queensland Art Gallery, as well as in several important overseas collections.

In September 2017, Bennett's 1991 Possession Island was unveiled at London's Tate Modern.

== See also ==
- Visual arts of Australia
