= Speech and Hearing Bioscience and Technology =

The Speech and Hearing Bioscience and Technology (SHBT) PhD program in the Harvard Medical School - Division of Medical Sciences is an interdisciplinary training program designed to produce the next generation of pioneers in basic and clinical speech and hearing research. The program was established in 1992 by Nelson Kiang and was initially administered through MIT before moving to the Harvard-MIT HST Program and finally Harvard Medical School. The program was co-directed by Drs. Louis Braida and Bertrand Delgutte until 2002; Bertrand Delgutte was the director of the program from 2002 to 2012; Gwenaëlle Géléoc is the current director of the program.

As of 2022, the program has graduated about 155 PhD students in nearly all areas of speech and hearing research including: auditory mechanics, peripheral and central auditory neuroscience, auditory psychophysics, hearing aids/cochlear implants, speech perception and production, machine processing of speech, language processing, voice disorders/laryngeal physiology, and vestibular physiology. Graduates may combine research careers with clinical practice in otology, laryngology, audiology, or speech–language pathology.

There are about 60 faculty members in the SHBT program, most of which hold appointments at MIT or Harvard Medical School. The main laboratories are at MIT, Harvard, the Massachusetts Eye and Ear Infirmary, Massachusetts General Hospital, Brigham and Women's Hospital, Boston Children's, Boston University, and Northeastern University.

== See also ==
- Massachusetts Institute of Technology
- Harvard University
- Harvard–MIT Program in Health Sciences and Technology
