= David Liberman =

Argentinian psychiatrist and psychoanalyst

David Liberman (2 October 1920, Buenos Aires–30 October 1983, Buenos Aires) was a relevant Argentinian psychiatrist and psychoanalyst.

== Biography ==
David Liberman was born in 1920 in Argentina. His family was constituted by musicians. He played the piano in the Jazz orchestra of his father, Sam Liberman. The experience in the jazz band could have had influenced in the development of his proposal since the jazz characteristics linked to the elaboration of it, where in an orchestra everyone might have a common base, moments of individual and collective interpretation are given, even complementary improvisations to the general artwork. There is a musician that indicates and leads but the group is the one who creates. Then he studied medicine and psychoanalysis. He was a disciple of Enrique Pichon-Rivière and developed his methods.

== Scientific background ==
His work for the doctoral thesis was the beginning of a long journey of investigation that establish the basis of a new concept of psychoanalysis in which the patient is approached from every possible aspects, it means, in its totality. To achieve this he proposed to apply the method of Leopold von Ranke to the psychoanalytical analysis. For him the method of analysis has to be divided in different parts: external criticism, internal criticism, synthesis and histography of the disorder. The theory that constitutes the basis of this is the communication theory and the disorder is understood as a disruption of the learning and communication process, producing a deficit of adaptation to reality. Amongst all his works, the most original has been his book in three volumes: “Lingüística, interacción comunicativa y proceso psicoanalítico”. The author has been influenced by so diverse authors such as Roman Jakobson, Jurgen Ruesch, Gregory Bateson and Melanie Klein, which he gathered in his attempt to categorize the stylistic predominances in the verbal and non-verbal manifestations in the different types of patients.

== The styles approach ==
The proposal that Liberman does is to investigate the processes from a semiotic and linguistic perspective. He proposed to consider psychoanalysis as an empirical science, and sustained that it exist two possible researches: during session, in the patient, and out of it, in the patient, the therapist or the bond between them. He added that it is convenient to think each patient not as a separate unit but in connection with the therapist. He postulated also that the empirical basis of the psychoanalytic research is the exchanges between the patient and therapist, each of them with a combinatory of expressive styles, which cover the verbal and non-verbal terrain. Amongst the styles of the therapist and the patient it could be given complementarities that improve the clinic work or missed encounters that disturb it. He described each patient as a combinatory of styles, with one of them dominant. Thus, he sustained that in the obsessive patient it predominates a narrative style, in the patient with anxiety hysteria, the dramatic with suspense style, in the patient with conversion hysteria, the dramatic with aesthetic impact style, in the transgressor patient, the epic style, in the depressive patient, the lyrical style and in the schizoid patient, the reflexive style. In each case it is possible to observe variations that accentuate or attenuate the stylistic pathological features. He presented also accurate descriptions of the main features of each style. Inspired in Freud's, Abraham's and M. Klein's ideas, he sustained also that each style is an expression of certain drive fixation: primary oral in the reflexive style, secondary sadistic oral in the lyrical style, primary sadistic anal in the epic style, secondarysadistic anal in the narrative style, urethral phallic in the dramatic and suspense style, and genital phallic in the dramatic with aesthetic impact style. He also wrote books in collaboration where he continued the same theoretical and clinical orientation. The first of them, with David Maldavsky, was dedicated to the analysis of the Ego Ideal and the value systems. Others were destined to the child analysis or the failures of the symbolic capacity in psychosomatic perturbations. In the honour to his mentor, David Maldavsky designated as David Liberman algorithm the research method he created, useful for the study of wishes and defenses in the verbal and non-verbal manifestations, either in clinic or in social terrain.

== His work ==
Semiología psicosomática (1947), La comunicación en terapéutica psicoanalista (1963) Lingüística, interacción comunicativa y proceso psicoanalítico (1971). Psicoanálisis y semiótica; D. Liberman and D. Maldavsky. (1975) Semiótica y psicoanálisis de niños (1984), D. Liberman; R. F. B. de Podetti; I. Miravent and M. Waserman. Del cuerpo al símbolo: sobreadaptación y enfermedad psicosomática (1986) D. Liberman; E. Grassano de Piccolo; S. Neborak de Dimant; L. Pistiner de Cortiñas; P. Roitman de Woscoboinik.
