= Ad astra =

Latin phrase meaning "to the stars"

Ad astra is a Latin phrase meaning "to the stars". The phrase has origins with Virgil, who wrote in his Aeneid: "sic itur ad astra" ('thus one journeys to the stars') and "opta ardua pennis astra sequi" ('desire to pursue the high[/hard to reach] stars on wings'). Another origin is Seneca the Younger, who wrote in Hercules: "non est ad astra mollis e terris via" ('there is no easy way from the earth to the stars').

== Etymology ==
Ad is a Latin preposition expressing direction toward in space or time (e.g. ad nauseam, ad infinitum, ad hoc, ad libidem, ad valorem, ad hominem). It is also used as a prefix in Latin word formation.

Astra is the accusative plural form of the Latin word astrum 'star' (from Ancient Greek ἄστρον astron 'star', from Proto-Indo-European *h₂ster-).

== Mottos ==
Ad astra is used as, or as part of, the motto of many organizations, most prominently, military air forces. It has also been adopted as a proper name for various such things as publications, bands, video games, etc. It likewise sees general use as a popular Latin tag.

=== Ad astra ===
- Ad Astra Rocket Company, Webster, Texas, United States
- Motto of Astor family
- Innova Junior College, Singapore
- Presbyterian Ladies' College, Armidale, Australia
- United States Air Force Academy Class of 2007
- United States Coast Guard Academy Class of 1992
- USS Taurus (PHM-3)
- University College Dublin, member institution of the National University of Ireland
- Downe House School, AGN house motto

=== Ad astra per alas porci ===
"To the stars on the wings of a pig"

- Motto on John Steinbeck's personal stamp, featuring a figure of the Pigasus. Steinbeck's motto had an error in the Latin and used 'alia' instead of 'alas'.
- Title of Chris Thile's mandolin concerto

=== Ad astra per aspera ===
"To the stars through difficulties"; "a rough road leads to the stars"; or "Through hardships, to the stars".
- Albury High School in Albury, New South Wales, Australia
- Apollo 1 memorial placed at Launch Complex 34
- Campbell University in Buies Creek, North Carolina
- Dr Challoner's Grammar School in Amersham, Buckinghamshire, England
- Immaculate Conception High School in Saint Andrew Parish, Jamaica, West Indies
- The State of Kansas (U.S. state motto)
- Morristown-Beard School in Morristown, New Jersey
- Mount Saint Michael Academy in The Bronx, New York City
- Starfleet, the fictional organization in the Star Trek universe
- Trinity Preparatory School in Winter Park, Florida
- Woodville High School, South Australia
- Rotorua Boys' High School in Rotorua, New Zealand
- Murroe AFC, Co Limerick, Ireland

=== De profundis ad astra ===
"From the depths to the stars."

- Los Angeles Science Fantasy Society. The official motto of the world's oldest continually operating science fiction fan social club, founded in 1934.

=== Per ardua ad astra ===
"Through adversity to the stars" or "Through struggle to the stars"

- Royal Air Force
- Royal Australian Air Force
- Royal Canadian Air Force (prior to 1968)
- Royal Flying Corps
- Royal Indian Air Force (1932–1950)
- Royal New Zealand Air Force
- Air Operations Branch of the Canadian Armed Forces

=== Per aspera ad astra ===
"Through hardships to the stars" or "To the stars through difficulties"

- Juan R. Liwag Memorial High School
- City of Gouda, The Netherlands
- Duchy of Mecklenburg-Schwerin
- Instituto Nacional Mejía
- Coat of arms of Mecklenburg-Schwerin
- Municipality of Cirebon, Indonesia (during the Dutch colonial period)
- Title of Sergei Bortkiewicz's Piano Concerto no. 3
- South African Air Force
- Stevens Institute of Technology
- University of Klagenfurt
- Included within the Sounds of Earth audio portion of the contents of the Voyager Golden Record is a track containing the inspirational message per aspera ad astra in Morse code.
- Municipality of Pouso Alto, Minas Gerais, Brazil
- Girton Grammar School, Australia

- Ad Astra Undergraduate Research Newsletter, LaGuardia Community College/CUNY

=== Per audacia ad astra ===
"Through boldness to the stars"

- Launch Enterprise Directorate, United States Space Force
- Bungie as the motto for the Destiny (video game) franchise

=== Quam celerrime ad astra ===
"With full speed to the stars"

- Chilean Air Force

=== Sic itur ad astra ===
"Thus one goes to the stars"

- The Philomathean Society, Philadelphia, Pennsylvania, United States
- The Canongate, Edinburgh, Scotland
- Admiral Collingwood Lodge, Australia
- City of Richmond, Virginia, United States
- Argentine Air Force, Materiel Command, Argentina
- The Geelong College, Australia
- Canadian Air Force (1920–1924)
- Colombian Aerospace Force
- 48 Air School in Woodbridge East London, one of the British Commonwealth Air Training Plan facilities in South Africa. Other units had Ad Unum Ad Astra and Per Artem Ad Astra.
- Llandysul Grammar School, Llandysul, Ceredigion, Wales

"Such is the pathway to the stars"

- Royal Canadian Air Force
- Brazilian Air Force Academy, in Pirassununga – São Paulo, Brazil. The Brazilian Air Force Academy uses the variation "Macte animo! Generose puer, sic itur ad astra!" which means: "Be brave! Young ones, this is the pathway to the stars."

"Reach for the stars"

- The Hertfordshire and Essex High School, Bishop's Stortford, Hertfordshire, England
- Falcon College, Zimbabwe

=== Hinc itur ad astra ===
"From here the way leads to the stars"

- Vilnius University, Vilnius, Lithuania

== Other uses ==
=== Literature ===
- "Ad Astra" is the title of a William Faulkner short story, found in Collected Stories of William Faulkner (New York: Vintage International).
- A derived phrase, ex astris ('from the stars'), is used frequently in NASA publications and in science fiction—see Ex astris, scientia.
- The phrase "Per Aspera, Ad Astra" is used as a motto by Golds, recalling the Earth eras pre-conquering, in the popular Red Rising science fiction saga.

=== Music ===
- "Per aspera ad Astra" is the name of a track from the album Eppur si muove by German symphonic metal band Haggard.
- The phrase "Ad Astra" is a key phrase in Nightwish's song Shoemaker and the name of track 8 on disc two from their album Human. :II: Nature.
- "Ad Astra" is the title of a song by Finnish composer Antti Martikainen from the album "Novum" released November 30, 2022.
- “Sic itur ad astra” is the title of a track on Megaliths, the second album written and performed by Edinburgh-based experimental electronic musician Daniel McGurty, and released in 2022.
- "AD ASTRA" is the 15th track on the album SILOS, the fifth studio album of cinematic rock band Starset, released September 12, 2025.
- "AD ASTRA" is title of the ninth studio album of Northern Irish rock band Ash, released October 3, 2025.
- "Ad Astra" is the title of an album by Swedish stoner metal band Spiritual Beggars.

=== Art ===
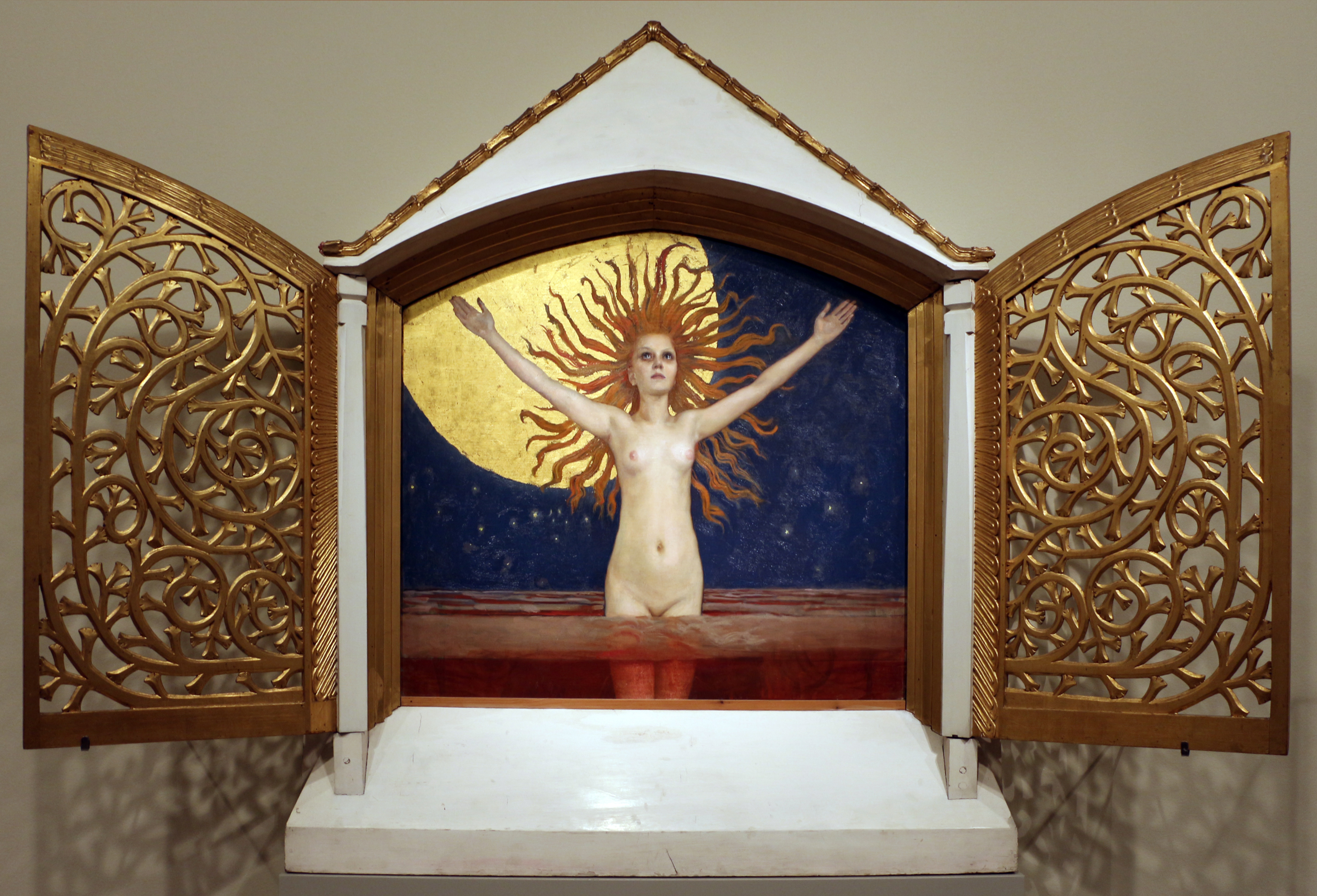
Ad astra by Finnish Akseli Gallen-Kallela (1894), resembling an altarpiece about Christ’s crucifixion and triumph of resurrection, amplyfied by the suspension of gravity and used for the baptism of Gallen-Kallela's daughter.

- Ad Astra is a 1976 public artwork by American artist Richard Lippold. Lippold's sculpture is located outside the Jefferson Drive entrance, and in the collection, of the National Air and Space Museum.

=== Film and television ===
- Ad Astra is the title of a 2019 science fiction film starring Brad Pitt.
- The phrase Sic itur ad astra was also used in the Netflix's Singaporean anime-influenced television series Trese.
- Ad Astra per Aspera is the title of the 2nd episode in season 2 of the Star Trek series Strange New Worlds

=== Computer games ===
- A 1984 computer game, Ad Astra is an outer space shoot-em-up with a 3-D perspective.
- The phrase Ad astra abyssosque is used as the motto for the Adventurer's Guild in the video game Genshin Impact.
- In the video game World of Tanks, Per Aspera Ad Astra is inscribed in the galaxy-themed Ad Astra style camouflage.
- In the video game Mafia 2, Per Aspera Ad Astra is the name of the last chapter.
