= Nueva Ecija University of Science and Technology =

State university in Nueva Ecija, Philippines

- Former names: Wright Institute (1908–1928); Nueva Ecija Trade School (1929–1953); Central Luzon School of Arts and Trades (1953–1964); Central Luzon Polytechnic College (1964–1998)
- Motto: Nourishing the Mind, Nurturing the Heart, Leading the Future
- Type: State University
- Established: 1908
- President: Rhodora R. Jugo
- Vice-president: Jean N. Guillasper (VP for Research, Extension and Training); Bembol DL. Castillo (VP for Administration Business and Finance); Feliciana P. Jacoba (VP for Academic Affairs)
- Administrative staff: 572
- Students: 3547
- Undergraduates: 34,975
- Postgraduates: 2,800
- Other students: 572 (Senior High School)
- Location: Gen. Tinio Street, Cabanatuan, Nueva Ecija, Philippines; 15°26′49″N 120°56′22″E
- Campus: Sumacab Main Campus Gen. Tinio Street Campus San Isidro Campus Gabaldon Campus Fort Magsaysay Campus Atate Campus Sto. Domingo Campus Nampicuan Campus Academic Extension Venues: (Carranglan, Gen. Tinio (Papaya), Peñaranda, San Antonio, San Leonardo, Talavera)
- Newspaper: The Blaze
- Colors: Gold Blue White
- Nickname: NEUSTians/Phoenix
- Website: www.neust.edu.ph
- Location in Nueva Ecija Location in Luzon Location in the Philippines

The Nueva Ecija University of Science and Technology (NEUST; Filipino: Pamantasan ng Nueva Ecija sa Agham at Teknolohiya) is a state university located in the province of Nueva Ecija, Central Luzon, Philippines, with its flagship campus at Cabanatuan. The university offers graduate and undergraduate courses in many specialized fields as well as vocational training programs.

The university was established in 1908 and celebrated its centennial year in 2008.

== History ==
The Nueva Ecija University of Science and Technology started as a vocational course at the Wright Institute in San Isidro, Nueva Ecija where young Filipinos were trained in woodworking and basic telegraphy, the said vocational course lasted until 1927 when the general secondary education course was transferred to Cabanatuan.

On June 9, 1929, the school was renamed the Nueva Ecija Trade School (NETS) in accordance with Vocational Education Act 3377 of 1929. The NETS was based in San Isidro, Nueva Ecija, offering vocational opportunities to the youth of the province. The first and only vocational course being offered then was woodworking. That course was an addition to the existing secondary curriculum inherited from the Wright Institute.

To meet with the increasing demand for vocational education in province, on June 7, 1931, the trade school was transferred to Cabanatuan. The program was interrupted in December 1941 by the outbreak of the Second World War in the Pacific.

After the war, the trade school immediately reopened on September 6, 1945, and rehabilitation programs took place. The trade school continued to provide vocational and manpower training for students from Nueva Ecija and nearby provinces. On June 8, 1948, a course in dressmaking was opened and for the first time female students were admitted in the school. A few years later, a food and cosmetology course was also offered.

On May 28, 1953, the NETS was converted into the Central Luzon School of Arts and Trades (CLSAT) by the virtue of Republic Act No. 845. CLSAT was recognized as a center of manpower and vocational training for both the youth and the adults not only in the province but also for the entire Central Luzon region. CLSAT was converted into the Central Luzon Polytechnic College (CLPC) by virtue of Republic Act. No. 3998 signed on June 18, 1964, by then President Diosdado Macapagal.

Thirty-four years later, under the leadership of then University President Gemiliano C. Calling, the Bill converting CLPC into NEUST was signed by House Speaker Jose de Venecia on February 19, 1998, and was forwarded to President Fidel V. Ramos on February 24, 1998. The bill lapsed into Law on March 27, 1998, as Republic Act. No. 8612, converting CLPC into a specialized university, the Nueva Ecija University of Science and Technology.

== Campuses ==
Locations of NEUST campuses and academic extension venues in Nueva Ecija. Blue pogs denote regular campuses, light green pogs for academic extended venues.

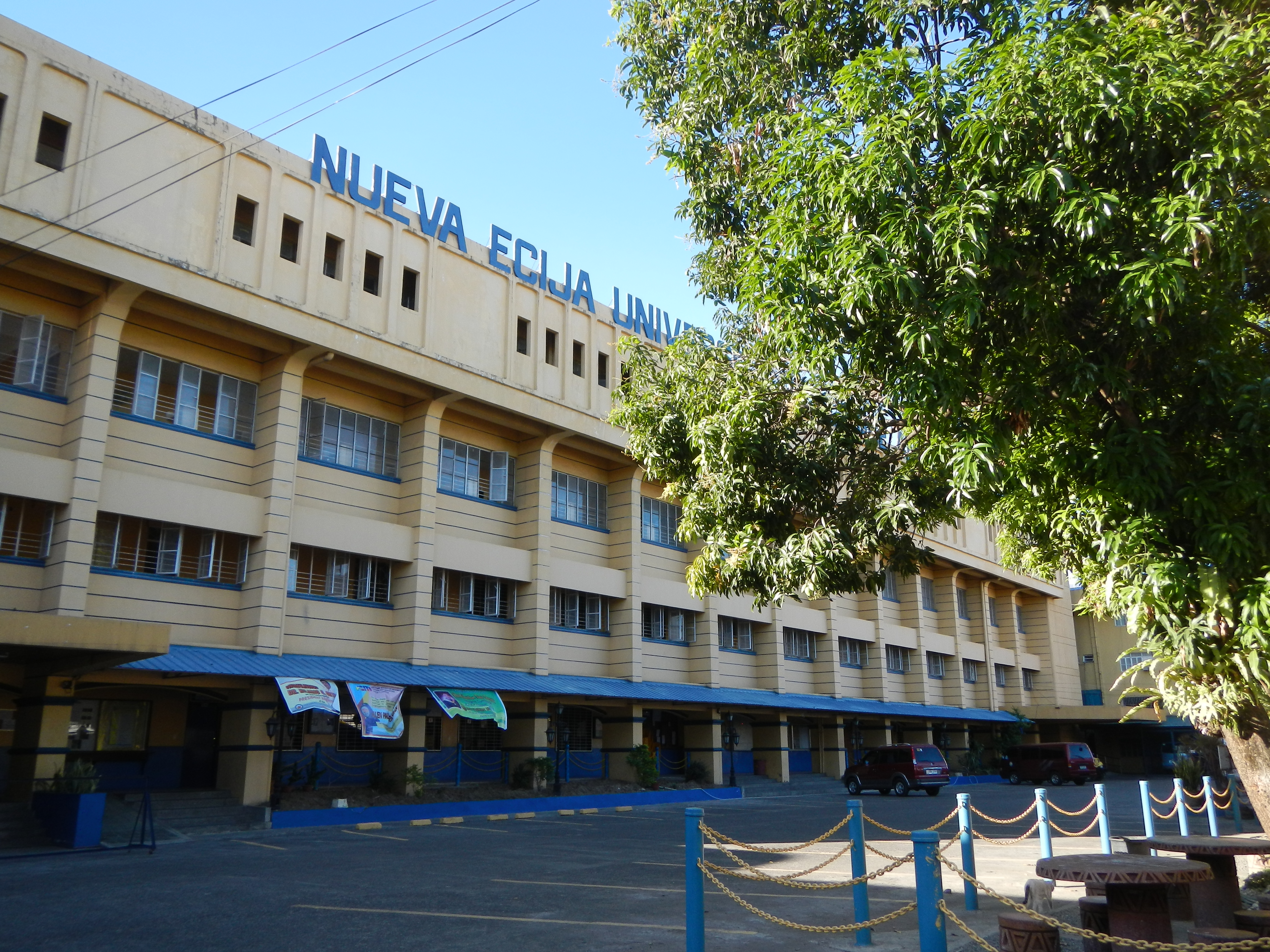
NEUST Gen. Tinio St. Campus, Cabanatuan

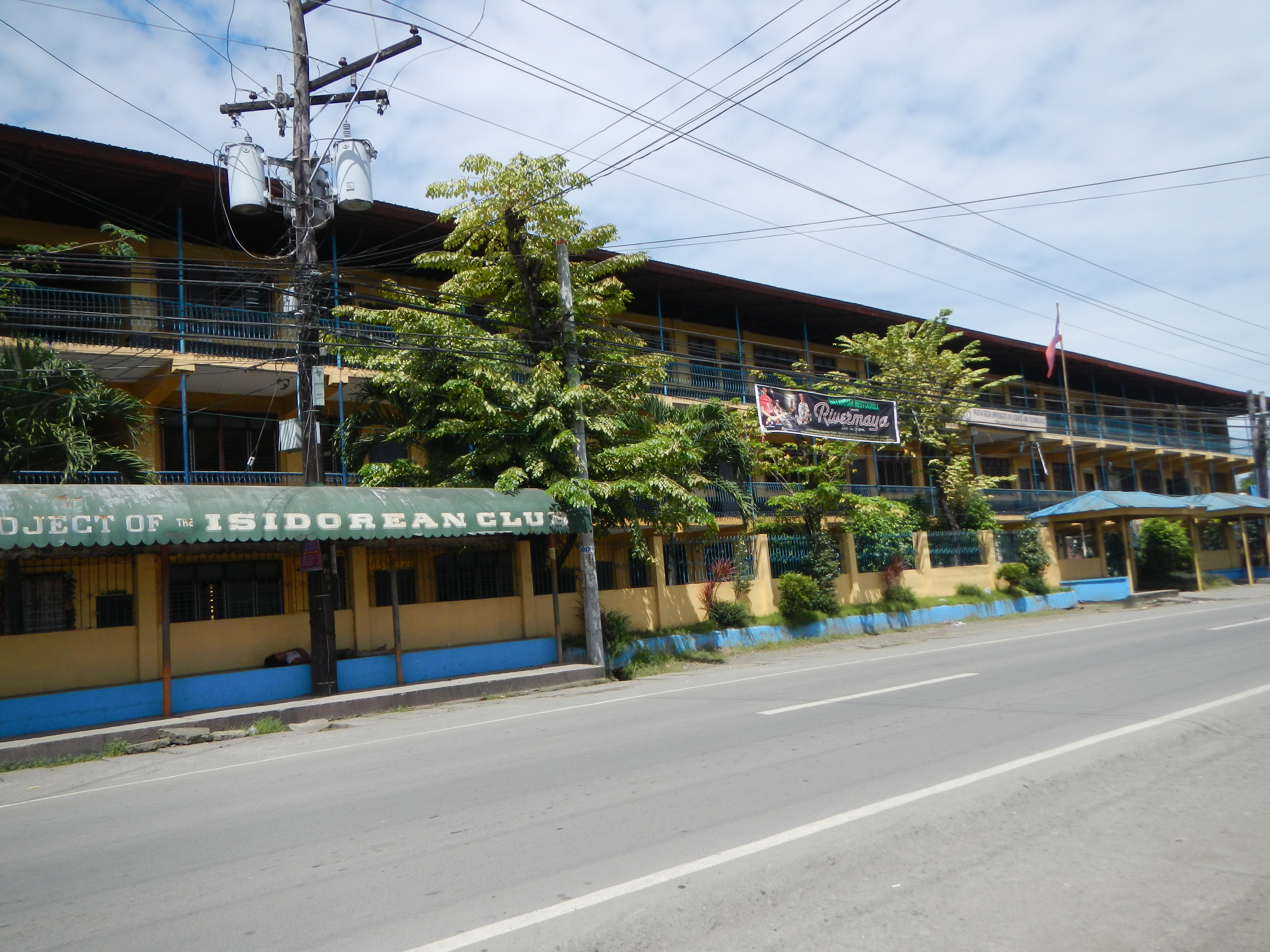
NEUST San Isidro Campus

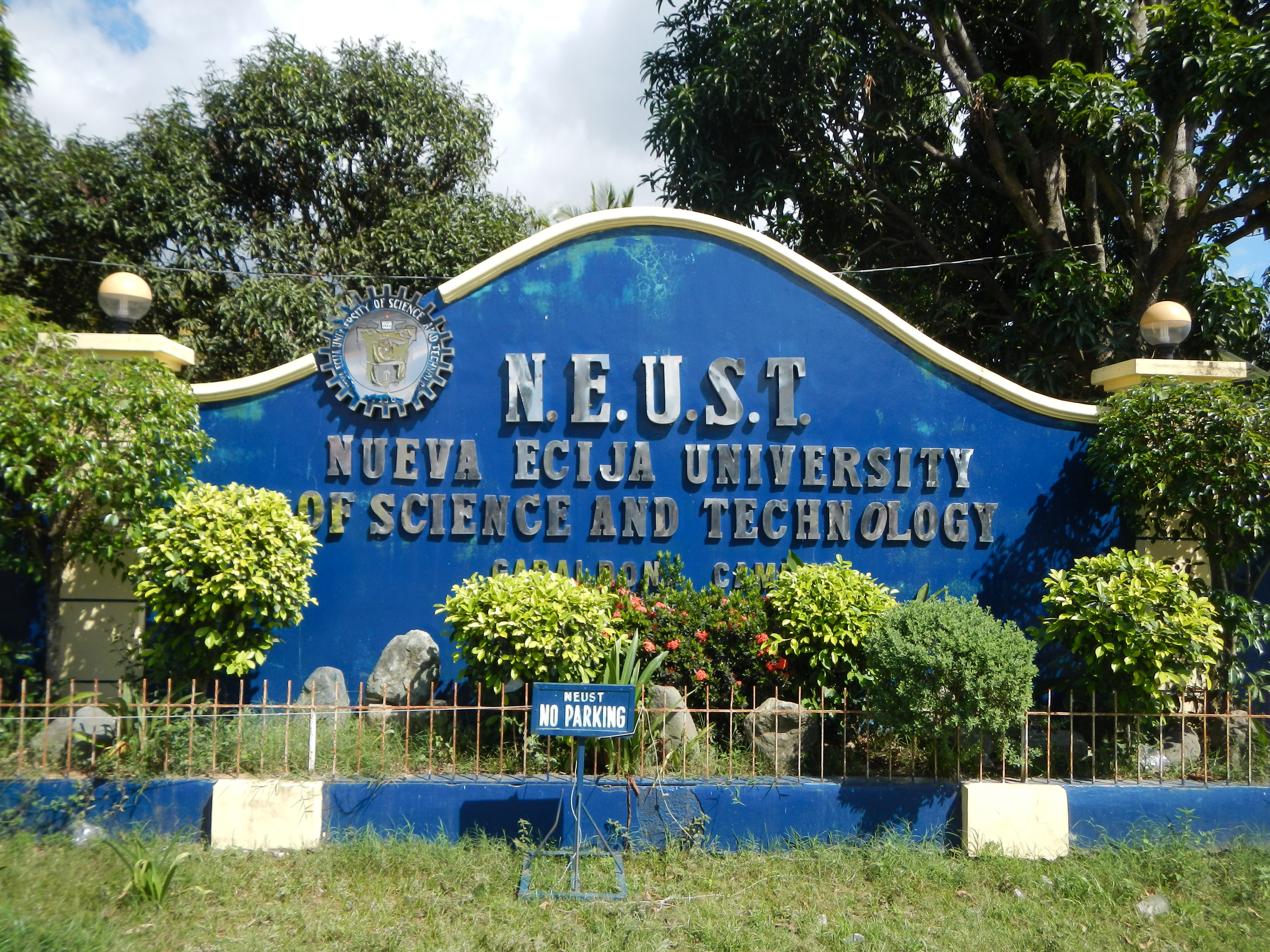
NEUST Gabaldon Campus

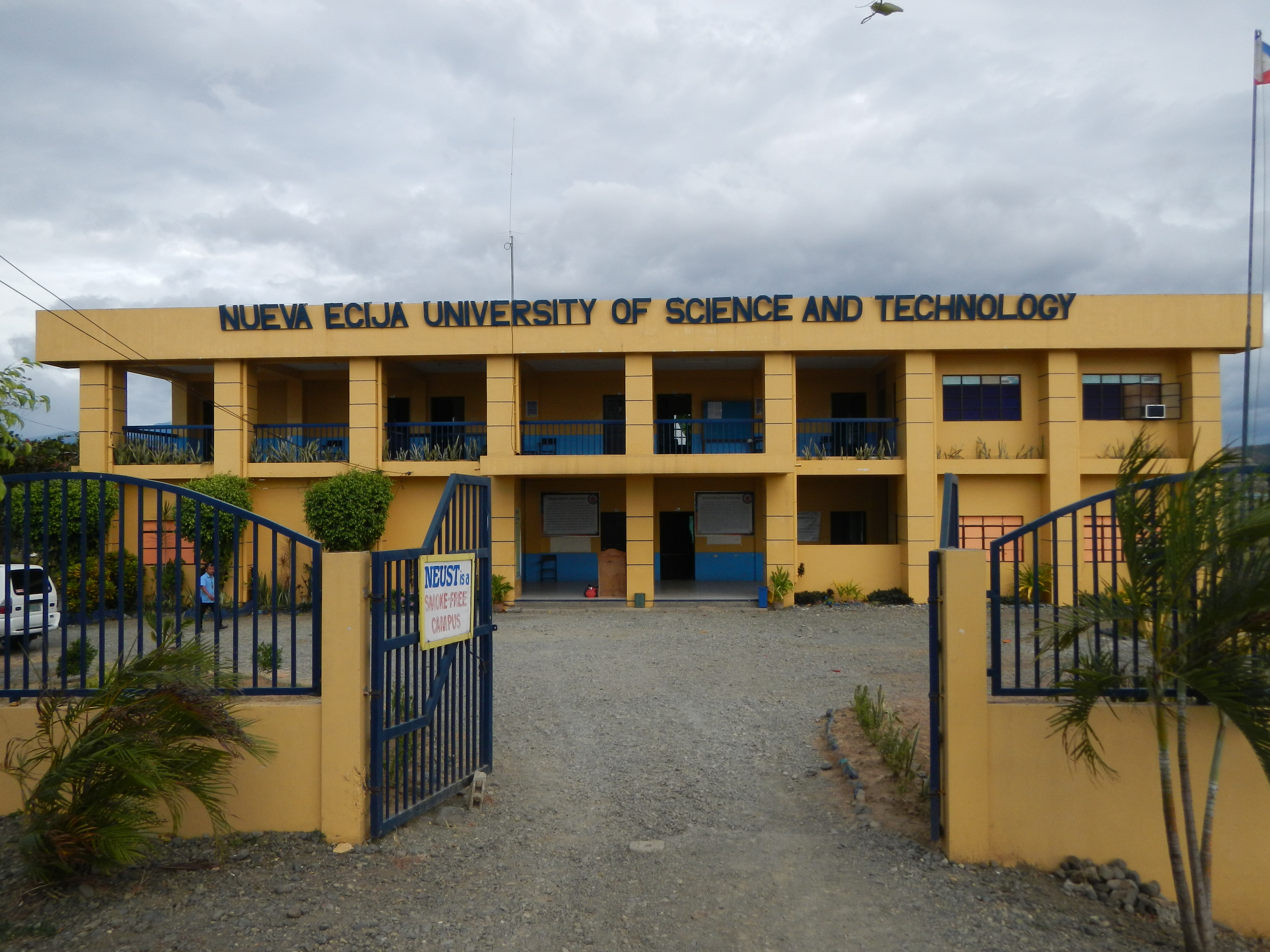
NEUST Atate Campus, Palayan City

As of December 2020, NEUST has eight campuses and six academic extended venues (formerly referred to as academic extension campuses) in different areas of Nueva Ecija:

Campuses

- Sumacab Main Campus
- General Tinio Street Campus
- Atate Campus
- Fort Magsaysay Campus
- Gabaldon Campus
- San Isidro Campus
- Sto. Domingo Campus
- Nampicuan Campus

Academic extended venues

- Carranglan Academic Extended Venue,
- Peñaranda Academic Extended Venue
- General Tinio Papaya Academic Extended Venue
- San Antonio Academic Extended Venue
- San Leonardo Academic Extended Venue
- Talavera Academic Extended Venue (MGT - Municipal Government of Talavera)

The university also maintains a Cyber Campus to assist distance learning students.

Former campus

- Gapan Academic Extension Campus (GAEC)

Gapan had an academic extension campus which was part of the South Academic Extension Campuses of the university. It was established by former Gapan mayor Ernesto L. Natividad and the NEUST administration in 2007. GAEC was initially located within the compound of Juan R. Liwag Memorial High School. GAEC now operates as the Gapan City College.

== Graduate courses ==
=== Gen. Tinio Street Campus, Cabanatuan ===
Graduate School

- Doctor of Education
  - Industrial Technology Education
- Doctor of Philosophy Major in
  - Science Education
  - Mathematics Education
  - Engineering Management
  - Educational Management
  - Business Administration
  - Public Administration
- Master of Arts in English
- Master of Arts in Industrial Education
- Master of Arts In Teaching Major in
  - Science
  - Physics
  - Mathematics
- Master of Arts in Vocational – Technological Education
- Master of Business Administration
- Master of Education Management
- Master of Engineering Management
- Master of Public Administration
- Master of Science in Agriculture

== Undergraduate courses ==
=== Sumacab Main Campus ===
College of Architecture

- Bachelor of Science in Architecture

College of Criminology

- Bachelor of Science in Criminology

College of Education

- Bachelor of Elementary Education
- Bachelor of Physical Education
- Bachelor of Secondary Education
  - Science
  - Mathematics
  - English
  - Filipino
  - Social Studies
- Bachelor of Technology and Livelihood Education
  - Home Economics
- Bachelor of Science in Industrial Education
  - Industrial Arts
- Bachelor of Special Needs Education
  - Early Childhood Education
- Certificate in Professional Teacher Education

College of Engineering

- Bachelor of Science in Civil Engineering
- Bachelor of Science in Electrical Engineering
- Bachelor of Science in Mechanical Engineering

College of Information and Communications Technology

- Bachelor of Science in Information Technology
  - Database Systems Technology
  - Network Systems Technology
  - Web Systems Technology

College of Management and Business Technology

- Bachelor of Science in Business Administration
  - Financial Management
  - Human Resources Management
  - Marketing Management
  - Economics
  - Business Process Outsourcing
- Bachelor of Science in Entrepreneurship
- Bachelor of Science in Hospitality Management
- Bachelor of Science in Hotel and Restaurant Management
- Bachelor of Science in Tourism Management

College of Public Administration and Disaster Management

- Bachelor of Public Administration
- Bachelor of Public Administration
  - Disaster Management

=== Gen. Tinio Street Campus ===
College of Arts and Sciences

- Bachelor of Science in Biology
  - Medical Biology
- Bachelor of Science in Food Technology
- Bachelor of Science in Psychology
- Bachelor of Science in Chemistry
- Bachelor of Science in Environmental Science

College of Education

- Laboratory High School
  - Junior High School
  - Senior High School

College of Industrial Technology

- Accelerated Vocational Training Program
  - AM/FM Radio Servicing
  - Auto-CAD
  - Auto Electricity
  - Auto Engine
  - Baking
  - Computer Application Package
  - Culinary Arts
  - Drafting
  - Garments (Dress Making)
  - Industrial Motor Control
  - Industrial Wiring
  - Machine Shop
  - Motor Rewinding
  - Pneumatic and Electro-pneumatic Control
  - Programmable Logic Controller
  - TV/Video Servicing
  - Welding
- Bachelor of Industrial Technology
- Electronics and Communication Engineering Technology

College of Nursing

- Bachelor of Science in Nursing

College of Public Administration and Disaster Management

- Bachelor of Public Administration

College of Medicine

- Doctor of Medicine

=== Other campuses ===
Gabaldon Campus

- Bachelor of Science in Agriculture
- Bachelor of Elementary Education
- Bachelor of Secondary Education
- Bachelor of Science in Information Technology
- Bachelor of Science in Hospitality Management
- Laboratory High School

Atate Campus

- Bachelor of Science in Information Technology
- Bachelor of Science in Business Administration
- Bachelor of Science in Entrepreneurship
- Bachelor of Science in Hospitality Management
- Bachelor of Science in Hotel and Restaurant Management

Fort Magsaysay Campus

- Bachelor of Science in Business Administration

San Isidro Campus

- Bachelor of Elementary Education
- Bachelor of Physical Education
- Bachelor of Secondary Education
- Bachelor of Science in Industrial Education
- Bachelor of Science in Information Technology
- Bachelor of Science in Business Administration
- Bachelor of Science in Entrepreneurship
- Laboratory High School

=== Academic Extension Venues ===
Carranglan Academic Extension Venue

- Bachelor of Elementary Education
- Bachelor of Science in Information Technology
- Bachelor of Science in Business Administration
- Bachelor of Science in Entrepreneurship

General Tinio Papaya Academic Extension Venue

- Bachelor of Elementary Education
- Bachelor of Physical Education
- Bachelor of Secondary Education
- Bachelor of Science in Information Technology
- Bachelor of Science in Business Administration

Peñaranda Academic Extension Venue

- Bachelor of Elementary Education
- Bachelor of Secondary Education
- Bachelor of Science in Information Technology
- Bachelor of Science in Business Administration

San Antonio Academic Extension Venue

- Bachelor of Elementary Education
- Bachelor of Science in Information Technology
- Bachelor of Science in Business Administration

San Leonardo Academic Extension Venue

- Bachelor of Elementary Education
- Bachelor of Secondary Education
- Bachelor of Science in Information Technology
- Bachelor of Science in Business Administration
- Bachelor of Science in Hospitality Management

Talavera Academic Extension Venue

- Bachelor of Elementary Education
- Bachelor of Science in Information Technology
- Bachelor of Science in Business Administration

== Notable alumni ==
- Jason Abalos - Actor
- Perci Cendaña - representative, Akbayan Party-list
- Athena Imperial - Miss Earth - Water 2011; GMA news reporter
