= Curtis Carter =

Curtis Carter may refer to:

- Curtis L. Carter, academic
- Curtis Carter (basketball)
- Curtis P. Carter, a character in the 1949 film Alimony
