= Construction Fence (Keith Haring) =

Mural by Keith Haring in Milwaukee, Wisconsin

- Artist: Keith Haring
- Year: 1983
- Medium: Oil on plywood
- Movement: Pop art
- Dimensions: 240.03 cm × 2929.89 cm (94.50 in × 1,153.50 in)
- Location: Haggerty Museum of Art, Milwaukee, Wisconsin
- Accession: 83.12.3
- Website: Haggerty Museum of Art

Construction Fence or Milwaukee Mural is 1983 mural by American artist Keith Haring. The mural was commissioned in 1983 in celebration of the groundbreaking of the Haggerty Museum of Art in Milwaukee, Wisconsin. It originally decorated a fence surrounding the construction site of the museum and is currently in the museum's permanent collection. It is among the earliest large-scale, site-specific public art projects by Haring.

== Description ==
Construction Fence is painted on both sides of twenty-four 4×8 foot plywood panels and, when assembled, is 96 feet in length. The mural is painted on a white background with figures painted in black outlines filled in with orange Day-Glo paint. Curtis L. Carter, former director of the Haggerty Museum of Art, described the mural:

In the brightly colored orange and black Marquette mural, Haring's highly energized dancing figures are spread across the length of the mural: some spinning on their heads, others tossed wildly in the air. One figure is arched over backward with tiny moving figures on top. Serpent-like forms emerge out of the heads of two of the dancers, and two other dancing figures bear dog-like heads. Angel wings adorn two additional images. A TV monitor inscribed with the characters "83" marks the center of the mural; it forms the head of a dancing figure. Below the TV monitor near the bottom of one of the panels rests a single dog image, similar to the row of dogs on the back side of the mural. Near the right end of the mural two tiny figures dance in the head of another stationary figure with folded arms. The head is shaped in the form of a chalice, or perhaps a wine glass with XX's for eyes. The final (and the most dominating) image is a signature Haring three-eyed face with extended tongue. Positioned on the right end of the mural, it is similar to three-eyed faces introduced in Haring's work earlier in 1981.

The back of the mural is less complex and consists of two registers: a row of crawling babies above and a row of barking dogs below.

== Historical information ==
Haring was selected for the mural by Curtis L. Carter by suggestion of the philosopher of art Noël Carroll. Haring agreed to the offer despite relative lack of funding outside of travel and lodging expenses for himself and his then boyfriend Juan Dubose. Students in Marquette University's fine arts department built and primed the fence before Haring's arrival. Over three days, Haring drew the outlines and allowed some of the fine art students to fill in the figures with orange. He began with the back of the fence where, as he said:

On this side the main thing is that it has to be big enough that you can see it from over there on the freeway, so I'd do something that fits in this size of panel and take it up to maximum size for maximum readability from far away. The immediate obvious thing for me to do was a row of babies and a row of dogs, because number one it's sort of a signature, but it's also the most you can get out of the least images.

The iconography of the front of the fence consists of pictograms typical of Haring's imagery with a themes inspired by breakdancing. This was likely inspired by his experiences in the Paradise Garage and various Lower East Side dance clubs Haring frequented with his friends.

Haring additionally gifted an ink drawing on foamcore to the Haggerty Museum upon the completion of the mural.

== Exhibitions ==
Sections of the mural were installed inside the museum as part of the exhibition World Image from November 13, 1984, to March 3, 1985. Portions were also displayed in the exhibition Urban Images from June 14 to March 3, 1989. In 2005, all twenty four panels were displayed as part of the exhibition On the Fence. Some panels remain on continuous display in the museum's contemporary art section.
