= Charles O. Perry =

American sculptor (1929–2011)

- Born: Charles Owen Perry; October 18, 1929; Helena, Montana, USA
- Died: February 8, 2011 (aged 81); Norwalk, Connecticut, USA
- Occupations: Architect, sculptor, designer
- Website: www.charlesperry.com

Charles Owen Perry (October 18, 1929 — February 8, 2011) was an American sculptor particularly known for his large-scale public sculptures.

== Life ==
He served in the U.S. Army, during the Korean War, receiving a Bronze Star.

Perry initially studied architecture at Yale University, graduating in 1958. He then joined the firm of Skidmore, Owings and Merrill in San Francisco, where he continued to work as an architect until 1963. At the same time, Perry started developing some of his own ideas in sculpture and in 1964 staged his first one-man show of sculptural models in San Francisco, which led to some early commissions for his sculptures.

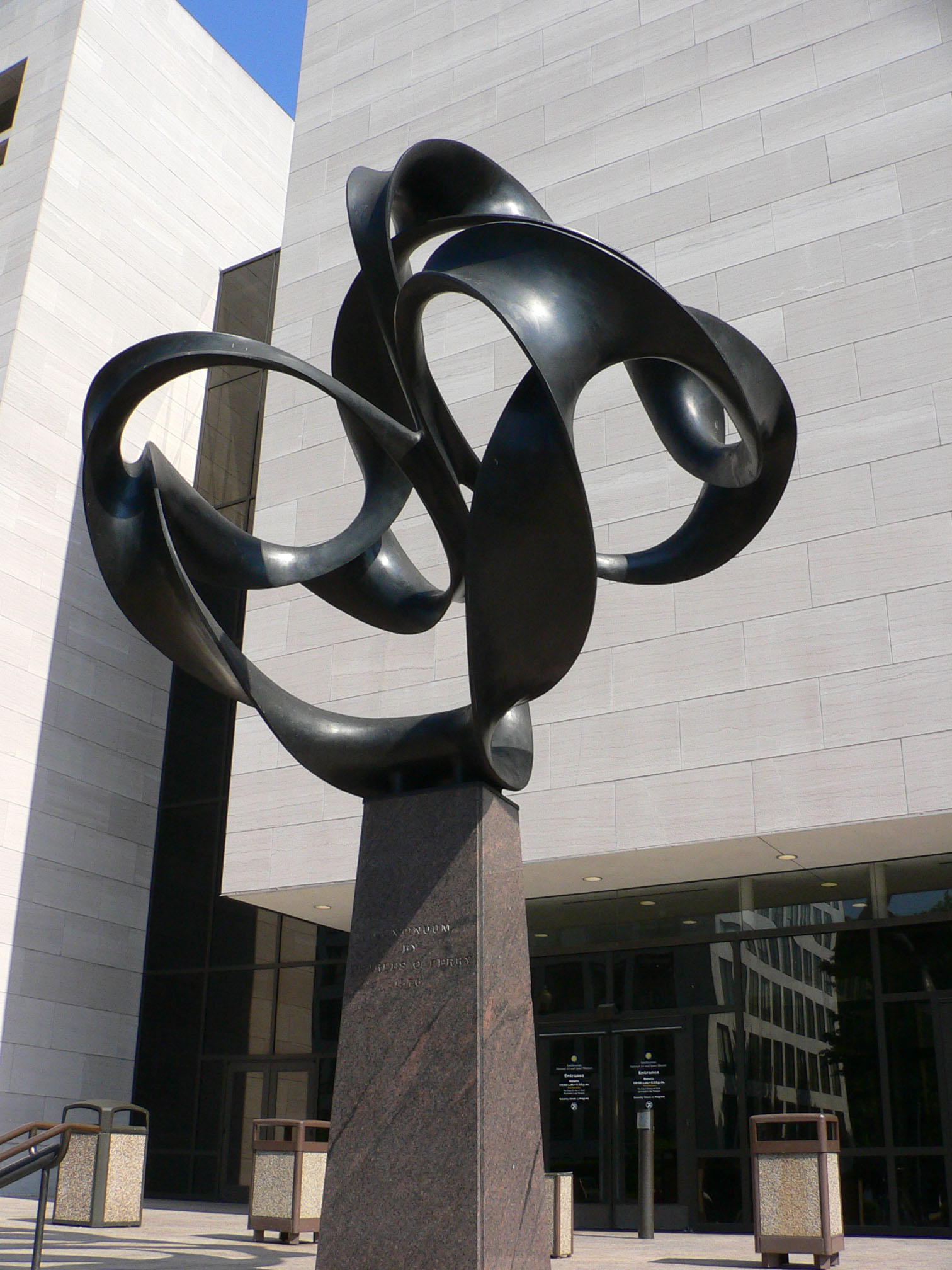
Continuum (1976), bronze, National Air and Space Museum Washington, D.C. The sculpture is based on the twists of the Möbius strip with a void in the center representing a black hole.

In the same year Perry won the Rome Prize (for architecture) from the American Academy in Rome and left for two years of study in Rome, Italy — an experience that confirmed his switch to sculpture. On returning to the United States, Perry began to concentrate on designing public sculptures, with Continuum outside the National Air and Space Museum, Washington, D.C., being his most prominent work.

In his later years, Perry diversified into developing chair designs, jewelry, and a number of sculptural puzzles for the Museum of Modern Art and the Smithsonian Institution.

In addition to his work as a sculptor, Perry designed a line of jewelry, and other items for Tiffany & Co

== Family ==
In 1962, he married Sheila Henry de Perry; they had five children. He also has a brother, Alexander Perry and sisters Carroll and Avery.

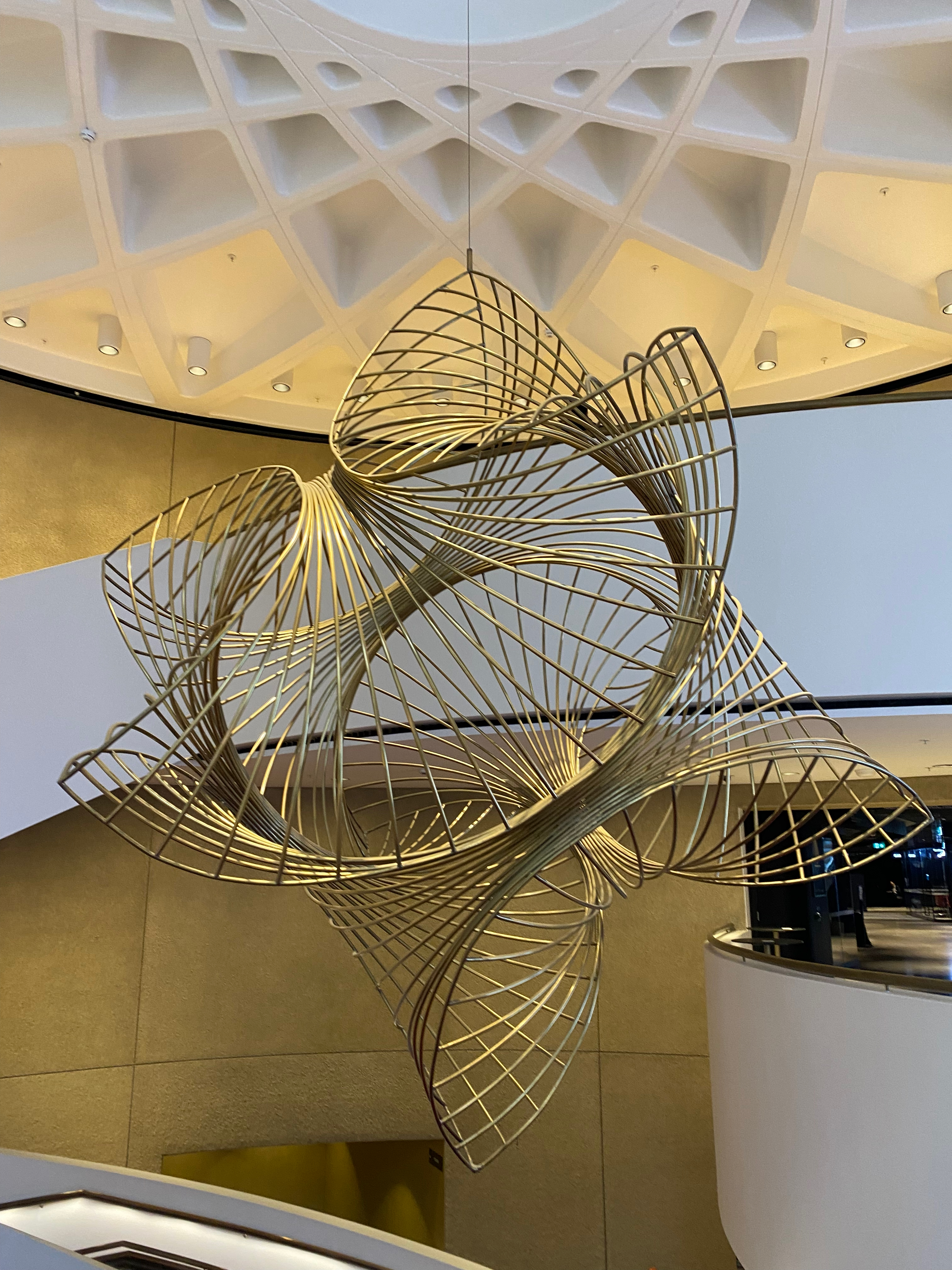
Mercator (1975) at the Theatre Royal Sydney, Australia
