= Ad Astra (sculpture) =

1976 public artwork by Richard Lippold

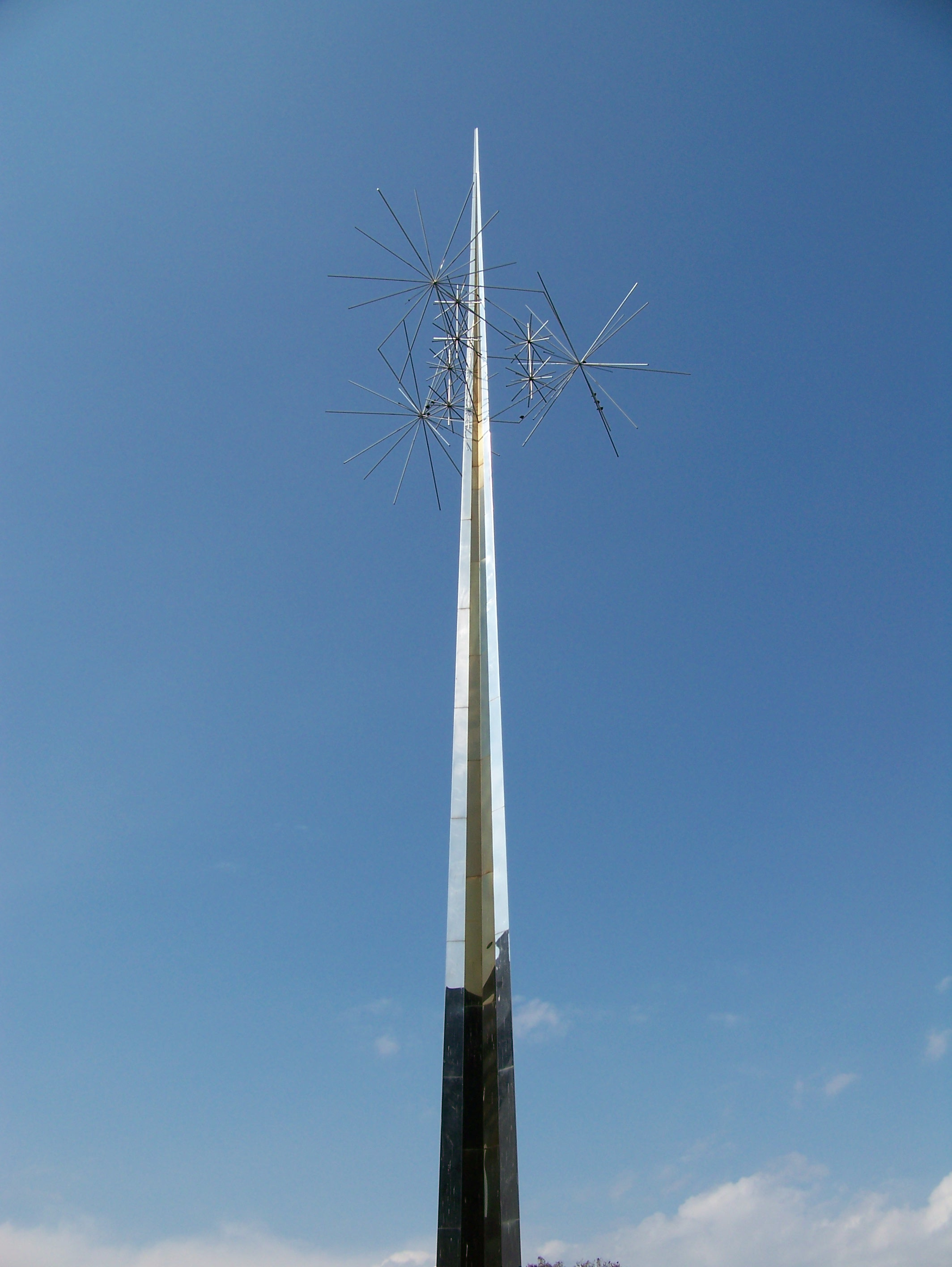
- Artist: Richard Lippold
- Year: 1976
- Type: Gold-colored polished stainless steel
- Dimensions: 35 m (115 ft)
- Location: National Air and Space Museum; Washington, D.C.; 38°53′18.99″N 77°1′11.45″W
- Owner: Smithsonian Institution

Ad Astra is a public artwork by American artist Richard Lippold. The abstract sculpture is located outside on the Jefferson Drive entrance of and in the collection of the National Air and Space Museum in Washington, D.C. The sculpture's title is Latin, meaning "To the Stars".

== Description ==
This abstract statue is made of gold-colored polished stainless steel. Standing at 100 feet tall, the piece consists of a "...three-planed narrow shaft ending in a pointed tip, penetrates a triple star-like cluster near its apex".

== Information ==
Lippold believed that "the characteristic art of our time deals with the conquest of space", with Ad Astra symbolizing just that. In 2009 the sculpture made an appearance in the film Night at the Museum: Battle of the Smithsonian.

== See also ==
- Continuum sculpture
- Delta Solar
- List of public art in Washington, D.C., Ward 2
