= Ex Stasis =

Artwork by Richard Lippold

Coordinates: 43.036684°N 87.92792°W

- Artist: Richard Lippold
- Year: 1988
- Type: stainless steel, anodized aluminum, gold-plated cables
- Dimensions: 370 cm × 150 cm × 150 cm (144 in × 60 in × 60 in)
- Location: Milwaukee, Wisconsin

Ex Stasis is a public art work created by American artist Richard Lippold and located on the campus of Marquette University in downtown Milwaukee, Wisconsin. The abstract sculpture is a series of angular metallic planes set on a concrete pedestal. It is located near Marquette's Haggerty Museum of Art, but used to be the centerpiece of the west courtyard of the Alumni Memorial Union.
