= Orpheus and Apollo =

Orpheus and Apollo is a 1962 sculpture by Richard Lippold. It was created for display in Philharmonic Hall (now David Geffen Hall) in Lincoln Center.

== History ==
Originally commissioned in 1961 by the Philharmonic’s architect Max Abramovitz to complete his new building, the five-ton installation stretched 190 feet wide and 40 feet high and resembled two mirrored and abstracted figures reaching out to each other but not quite touching. In consists of an ensemble of 188 Muntz metal bars suspended at complex angles midair from 444 thin stainless steel wires.

In 2014, the installation was removed because of fraying wires and corroded metal, and sent to a storage facility in New Jersey. By 2019, at the end of the schematic design phase for the renovation of the David Geffen Hall, the Lincoln Center determined that rehanging the massive sculpture was inconsistent with creating a more flexible ceiling rigged for speakers and lighting to support its expanded programming goals. The Philharmonic subsequently gave Orpheus and Apollo to the Port Authority of New York and New Jersey and invested in the restoration and re-lacquering of the Muntz bars before delivering them.

Since 2023, the sculpture has been displayed at the new glass-enclosed Atrium Business and Conference Center of La Guardia airport, connected to Terminal B’s arrivals and departures hall. With the help of engineering firm Thornton Tomasetti, the sculpture was adapted to the new space, stretched about 20 feet in width and pulled up tighter to the ceiling. The redisplay was the idea of architecture critic Paul Goldberger, who was consulting at the time with both Lincoln Center on their architect selection for Geffen Hall and the Port Authority for the redesign of La Guardia.
