= Continuum (sculpture) =

Public artwork by Charles O. Perry

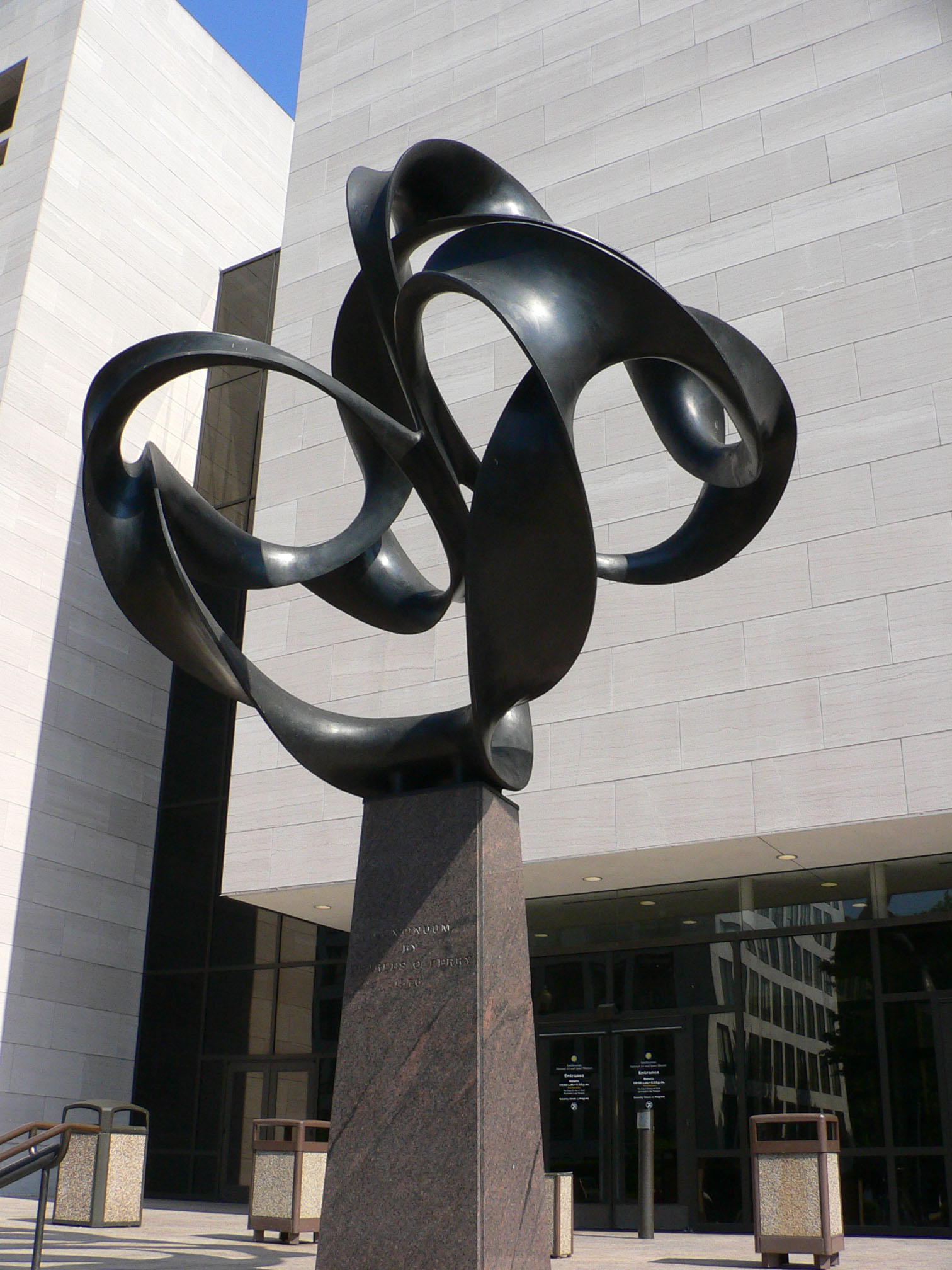
- Sculpture in 2005
- Artist: Charles O. Perry
- Year: 1976
- Type: Bronze
- Dimensions: 4.3 m (14 ft)
- Location: National Air and Space Museum, Washington, D.C., United States; 38°53′15.93″N 77°1′11.6″W
- Owner: Smithsonian Institution

Continuum is a public artwork by American sculptor Charles O. Perry located in front of the National Air and Space Museum in Washington, DC, United States.

== Description ==
The sculpture is a large swirling abstract that consists of 8 bronze pieces painted black and placed on a pole.

== Information ==
According to the artist the piece "began as an exploration of the Möbius strip, a product of pure mathematics formed by joining two ends of a strip of paper after giving one end a 180-degree twist, thus creating only one edge. The center of the bronze sculpture symbolizes a black hole, while the edge shows the flow of matter through the center from positive to negative space and back again in a continuum."

A similar sculpture by Perry, Continuum II, is installed in Marina Square in Singapore and dates to 1986.

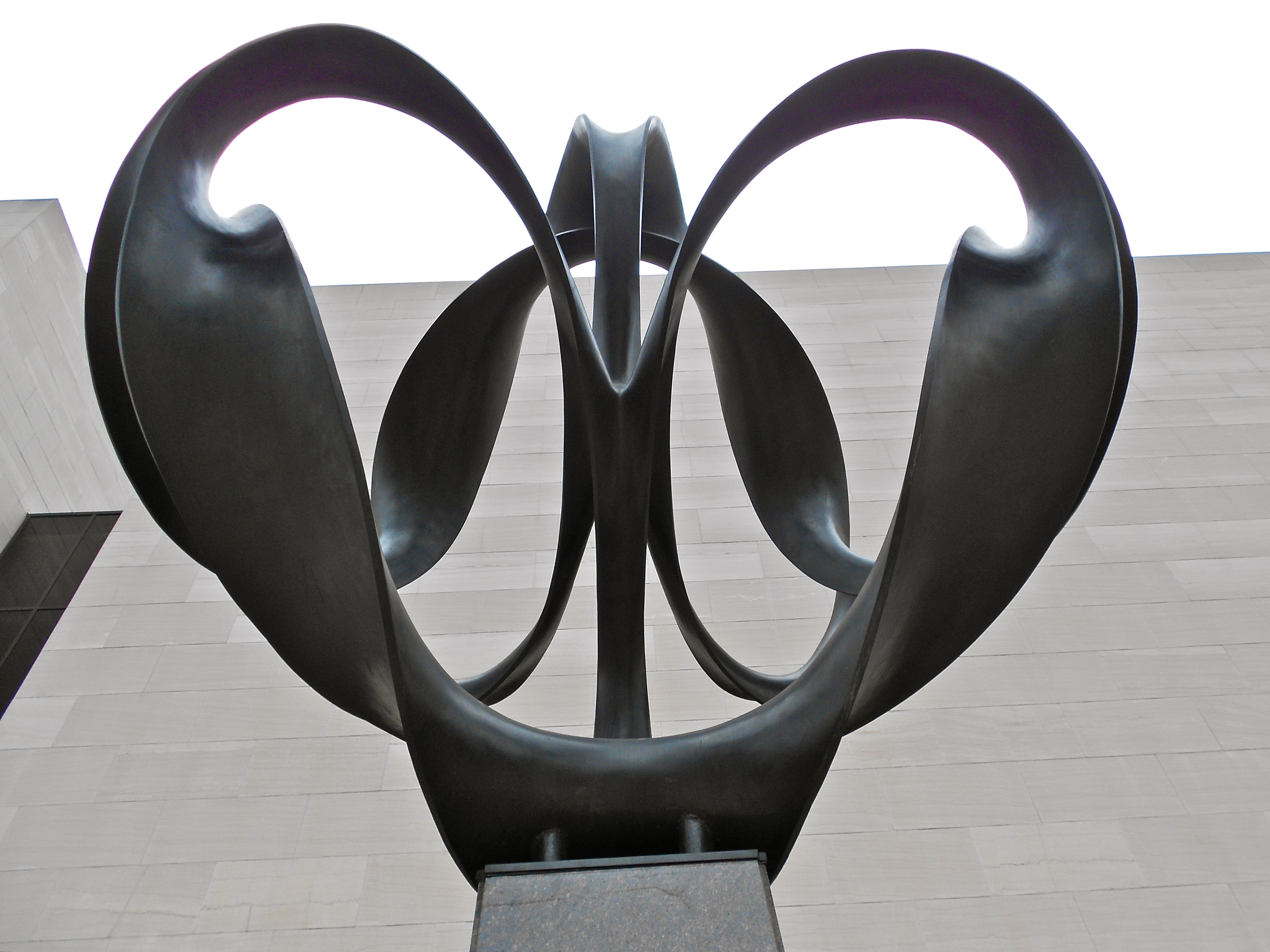
from below

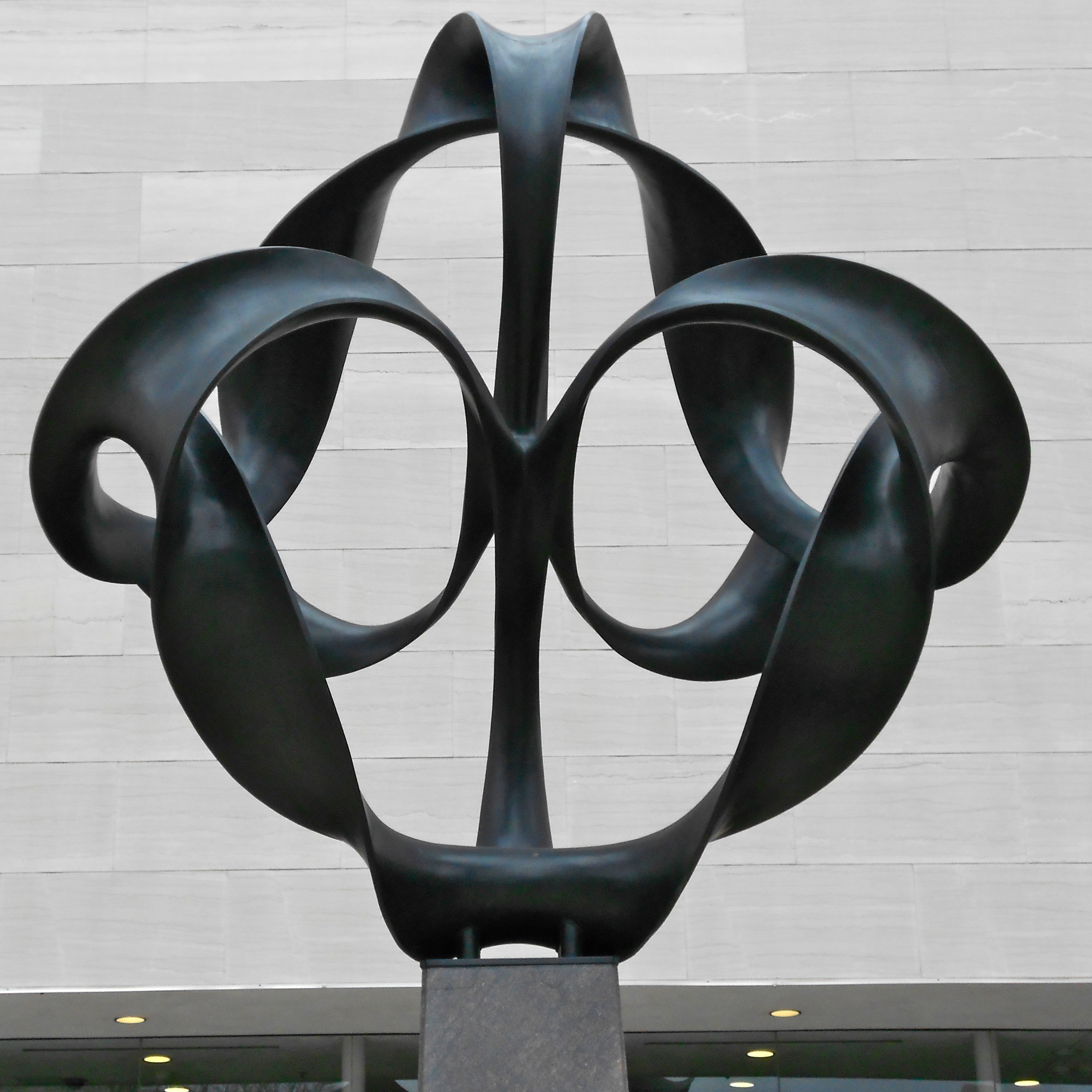
from the front (S)

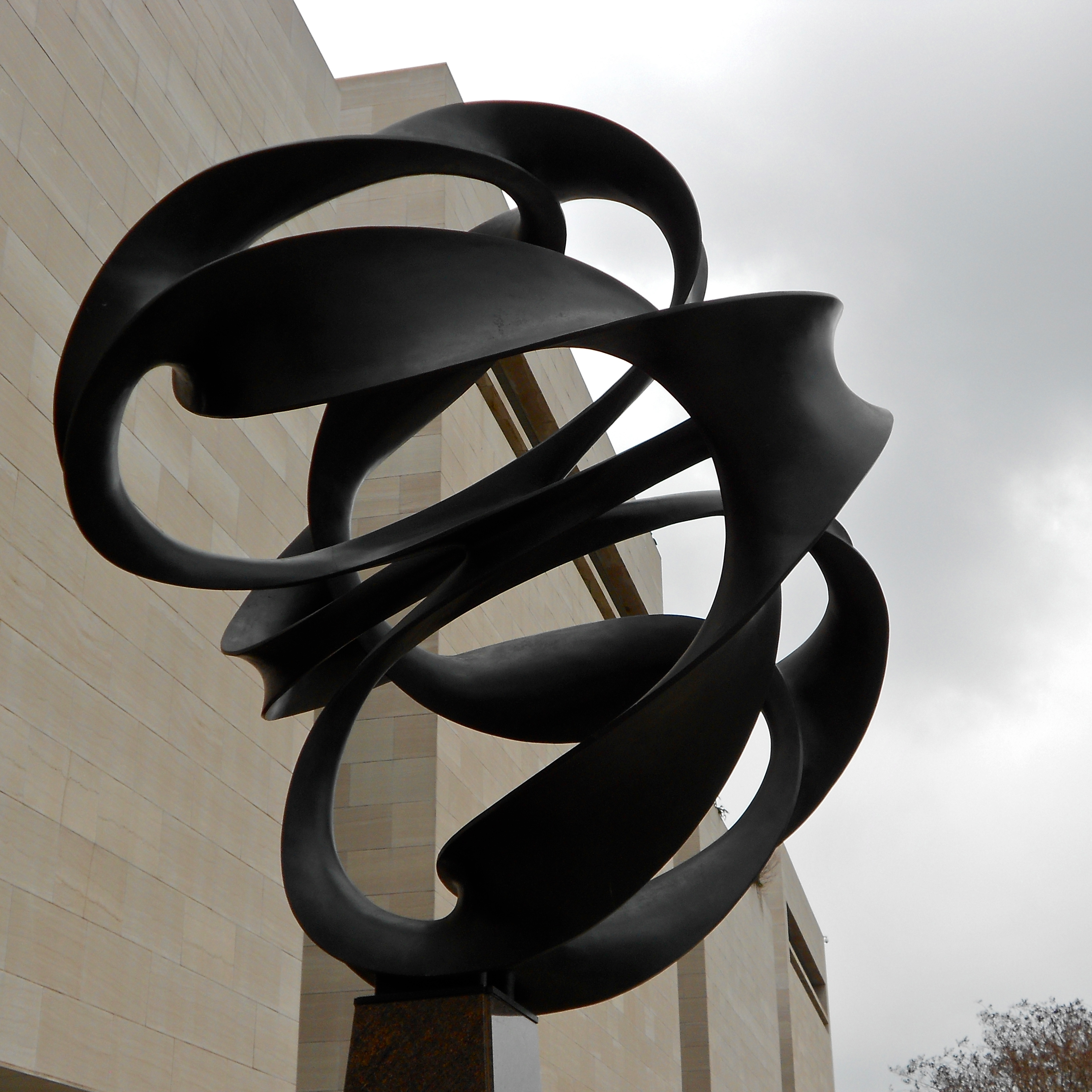
from the side (SW)

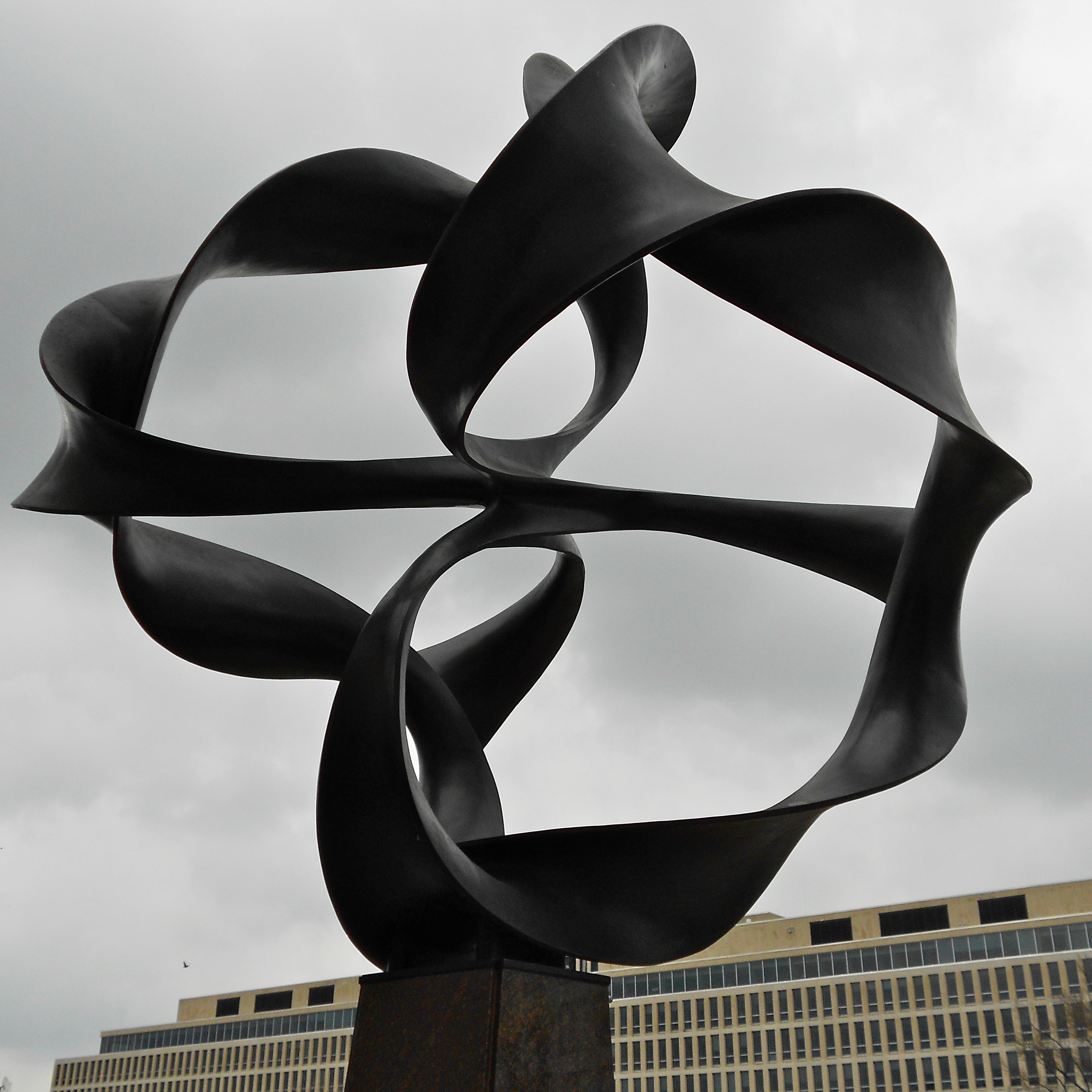
from the side (NW)

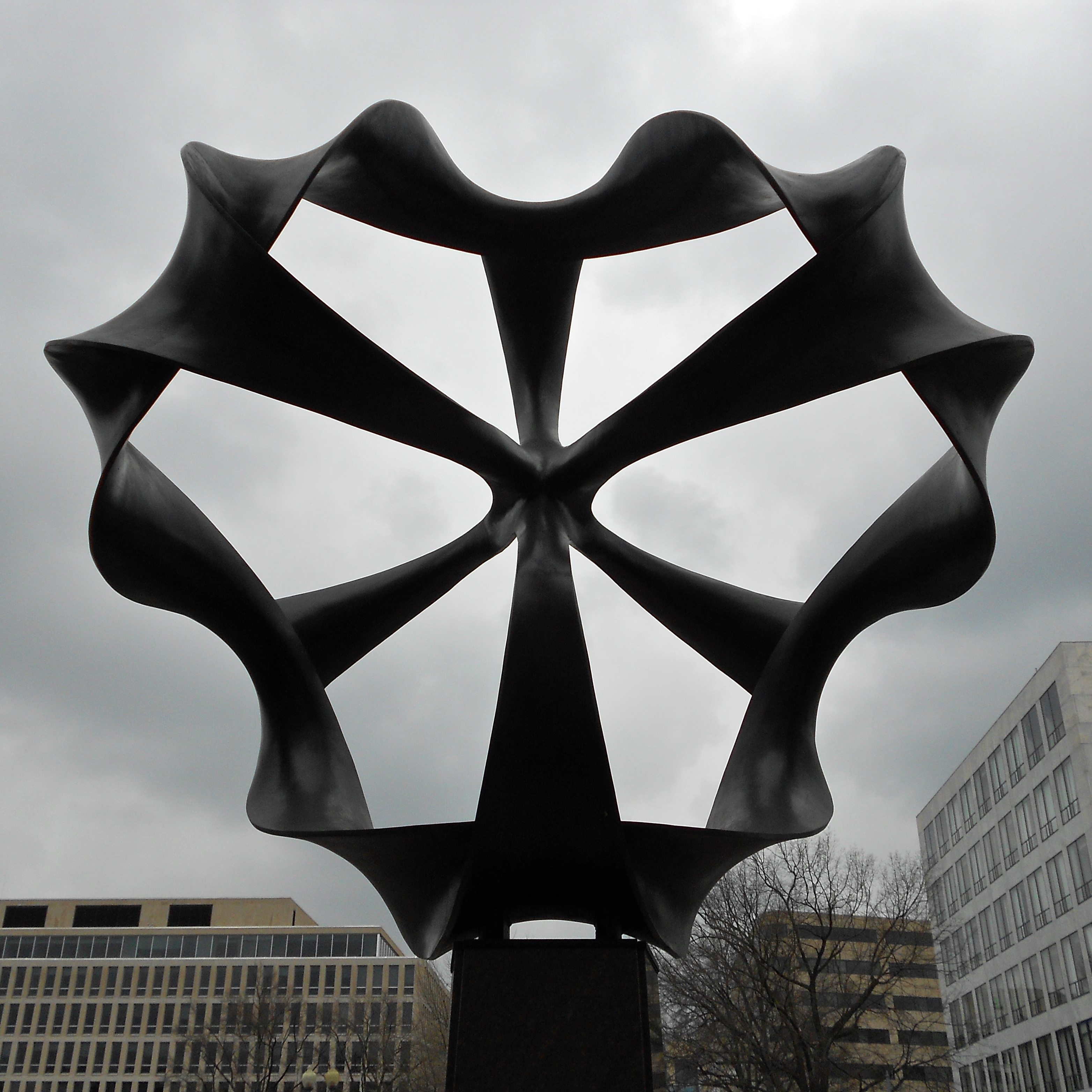
from the back (N)

undergoing conservation in 2010

== Condition ==
In July 2010 the piece underwent restoration to remove a green patina that formed on the sculpture. Perry's vision was for the piece to remain black. The piece was removed from its location to the west end of the building where it underwent its conservation by a contractor. The granite base that holds the 7,000 pound sculpture was also repaired.

== See also ==
- Ad Astra (Lippold sculpture)
- Delta Solar
- List of public art in Washington, D.C., Ward 2
