= Richard Lippold =

American sculptor

- Lippold working on a sculpture, circa 1950
- Born: May 3, 1915; Milwaukee, Wisconsin, U.S.
- Died: August 22, 2002 (aged 87); Locust Valley, New York, U.S.
- Education: University of Chicago; Art Institute of Chicago
- Known for: Sculpture
- Notable work: Ad Astra

Richard Lippold (May 3, 1915 – August 22, 2002) was an American sculptor, known for his geometric constructions using wire as a medium.

== Life ==
Lippold was born in Milwaukee, Wisconsin. He studied at the University of Chicago, and graduated from the School of the Art Institute of Chicago in industrial design in 1937. Lippold worked as an industrial designer from 1937 to 1941. After he became a sculptor, Lippold taught at several universities, including Hunter College at the City University of New York, from 1952 to 1967. During his brief tenure at Black Mountain College, he was introduced to the artist Ray Johnson, with whom he was involved romantically for many years.

When describing Lippold's floor-to-ceiling sculpture "Trinity", the American artist Howard Newman said:

Lippold was an engineering genius, but we've been dealing with a piece that had reached the threshold of catastrophe,...People's mouths fall open when they see it going back up, like they're watching a spider spin a web of blazing gold,...The more that goes up, the more exquisite it gets.

The 14th and 15th of John Cage's famous Sonatas and Interludes for prepared piano are subtitled Gemini – after the work of Richard Lippold.

== Works ==
- 1949–50, Variation Number 7: Full Moon, at the Museum of Modern Art in New York City
- 1950, World Tree, in Harvard Graduate Center at Harvard Law School in Cambridge, Massachusetts. Walter Gropius, designer
- 1950–51, Aerial Act, at the Wadsworth Atheneum in Hartford, Connecticut
- 1953–56, Variation within a Sphere, Number 10: The Sun, at the Metropolitan Museum of Art in New York City, which includes more than two miles of gold wire; first commissioned work by this museum.
- 1958–60, Trinity, Chapel of Portsmouth Abbey School, Portsmouth, RI. Pietro Belluschi, building architect.
- 1958, Radiant I, at the Inland Steel Building in Chicago, IL. Skidmore, Owings & Merrill, building architects
- 1959, Untitled, The Four Seasons, and Seagram Building Construction No. 1, at the Four Seasons Restaurant, Seagram Building, New York City. Philip Johnson, Mies Van der Rohe building architects.
- 1959, Great Lone Star, at the Longview Museum of Fine Arts, Longview, TX.
- 1959, Spirit Vine (label art), The Museum of Wine in Art, Château Mouton Rothschild, Pauillac, France.
- 1961, Homage to Our Age, Reception Area, J. Walter Thompson, New York City.
- 1962, Orpheus and Apollo, at Avery Fisher Hall at Lincoln Center in New York City, with architect Max Abramovitz Orpheus and Apollo has been reinstalled at LaGuardia Airport as per NY Times 10/14/2023.
- 1963, Flight, PanAm Building, New York, NY, with architects Emery Roth, Pietro Belluschi, Walter Gropius.
- 1966, Gemini II, at Jones Hall, Houston, TX. William Wayne Caudill, building architect.
- 1967–70, Baldacchino, St. Mary's Cathedral, San Francisco, CA. Pietro Belluschi, building architect.
- 1970, Homage to North Carolina, at North Carolina National Bank, Charlotte, North Carolina,
- 1970, Youth, Fine Arts Museum of the South, Mobile, Alabama.
- 1975, Flora Raris, Hyatt Regency Atlanta
- 1975, Homage to H.I.H. the Late King Faisal, InterContinental Hotel Conference Center, Riyadh, Saudi Arabia
- 1976, Ad Astra, at the National Air and Space Museum in Washington, D.C. Gyo Obata, building architect.
- 1977, Untitled, Grand Court, Columbia Mall, Columbia, South Carolina
- 1977, In Skyspace, Kish International Airport, Kish Island, Iran
- 1980, Wings of Welcome at the Hyatt Regency, in Milwaukee, Wisconsin. Py-Vavra, building architect.
- 1981, Winged Gamma, for Park Avenue Atrium Building, New York City, with office of Edward Durell Stone
- 1984, Untitled, One Financial Center, Boston
- 1985, Primal Energy, Sohio Headquarters, Cleveland, Ohio
- 1985, Counterpoint with Architecture, Deutsche Bank, Frankfurt, Germany
- 1986, Fire Bird at the Orange County Performing Art Center, Costa Mesa, California. Cesar Pelli, building architect.
- 1986, Copper Crystal, Crystal Park II Building, Crystal City, Virginia
- 1986, Homage to South Korea, Dae-Han Building, Seoul, Korea
- 1986, Orchidea, Marina Mandarin Hotel, Singapore
- 1988, Ex Stasis, Haggerty Museum, Marquette University, Milwaukee, Wisconsin. Kahler Slater, building architect.
- 1988, Encounter at Fairlane Town Center, Dearborn, Michigan (de-installed pending conservation)

== Group exhibitions ==
- Origins of Modern Sculpture, 1945 Organized by Wilhelm Valentiner
  - Detroit Institute of Arts, January 22, 1946, to March 3, 1946
  - City Art Museum of Saint Louis, March 30, 1946, to May 1, 1946

== Solo exhibitions ==
- Willard Gallery 1947, 1948,1949, 1950, 1951, 1952, 1961, 1968, 1973
- Arts Club of Chicago, Richard Lippold Sculpture, 1954
- Patrick and Beatrice Haggerty Museum of Art, Richard Lippold: Sculpture, 1990–91

== Publications ==
- Notes in Passing, by Richard Lippold, Arts & Architecture, August 1947.
- Before Band Wagons, Allene Talmey, Vogue Magazine. August 15, 1949, p. 133.
- Craft Horizons, June 1952.
- Four Artists in a Mansion, Harpers Bazaar, July 1952.
- French Vogue, May 1955.
- Lippold Makes a Construction, by Lawerence Campbell, Art News, Oct. 1956.
- Eye on the Sun, Vogue, February 1, 1958.
- Profiles: A Thing Among Things, Calvin Tompkins, New Yorker, March 1963.
- Synergizing Space, Sculpture, Architecture and Richard Lippold at Lincoln Center, Marin R. Sullivan, American Art, Summer 2019.
