= Ruins X =

Public art sculpture at Marquette University

Coordinates: 43.037074°N 87.928328°W

- Artist: Ernest Carl Shaw
- Year: 1978
- Type: painted steel
- Dimensions: 290 cm × 290 cm × 560 cm (116 in × 114 in × 222 in)
- Location: Milwaukee, Wisconsin
- Owner: Haggerty Museum of Art

Ruins X is a public art work created by American artist Ernest Carl Shaw and located at the Haggerty Museum of Art on the campus of Marquette University in downtown Milwaukee, Wisconsin. The abstract sculpture is part of a series of works in which the artist explores concepts of weight, balance, and order. It is located between Marquette's Haggerty Museum of Art and Helfaer Theatre.
