= Juan R. Liwag Memorial High School =

Public high school in Nueva Ecija, Philippines

- Pang-alaalang Pambansang Mataas na Paaralan ng Juan R. Liwag (Filipino)

Location
- Barangay Bayanihan, Gapan, Nueva Ecija; Region III; Philippines; 15°18′12″N 120°56′54″E

Information
- Former name: Gapan Municipal High School (1946–1952); Nueva Ecija South High School (1952-1972); Gapan Provincial High School (until 1982); Gapan National High School (1982-1984)
- Type: State-owned, public institution
- Motto: Per aspera ad astra
- Established: 1945
- Status: Active
- School code: 300812
- Principal: Richard M. Galang
- Grades: 7 to 12
- Language: English and Filipino
- Color: Blue
- Song: JRLMHS Hymn
- Newspaper: The Magi (English Publication); Ang Tatlong Haring Mago (Filipino Publication)
- Affiliations: Division of Gapan

Juan R. Liwag Memorial High School (abbreviated as JRLMHS; Filipino: Pang-alaalang Mataas na Paaralang Pambansa ng Juan R. Liwag) is a secondary public school in Barangay Bayanihan, Gapan, Nueva Ecija, Philippines. It was formerly known as Nueva Ecija South High School. It was established in 1945 and made into a national high school by virtue of BP Blg. 143 on 8 February 1982. The current principal of the main campus is Richard M. Galang, Principal IV.

== History ==
Juan R. Liwag Memorial High School (JRLMHS) was formerly named as Gapan Municipal High School from 1946 to 1952, Nueva Ecija South High School (NESHS) from 1952 to 1972, Gapan National High School (GNHS) from 1972 to 1984, and Juan R. Liwag Memorial High School (JRLMHS) from 1984 to present. It now offers special science class for students inclined in advance mathematics and sciences, sports oriented curriculum, and the regular general secondary (high school) programs. The student population of JRLMHS today is estimated to be over 5,000, making it one of the biggest public high schools in the province of Nueva Ecija. It also has the highest student population in the fourth congressional district (southern part) of the province, comprising the city of Gapan and the municipalities of Cabiao, General Tinio (Papaya), Jaen, San Antonio, San Isidro, San Leonardo, and Peñaranda. Most students usually are from Gapan, San Leonardo, San Isidro, Jaen, Peñaranda, and sometimes even from Sta. Rosa, Nueva Ecija and San Miguel, Bulacan.

Besides the main campus in Barangay Bayanihan, the school once had annexes located in Barangay Santa Cruz and Barangay Bungo in Gapan; those locations are now independent.

== Junior high school programs ==
The junior high school program is roughly equivalent to the middle school program in other countries. This grade level spans from grades 7 to 10. This program was reformed after the change in curriculum implemented by the Department of Education, changing the system of secondary education by adding more years to the high school program and splitting it into two separate programs.

- Science, Technology, and Engineering Program (STE), this program provides skills necessary in the field of science and technology for junior high school students in preparation of undertaking more advanced science subjects in higher grade levels. The program was formerly known by many names: Science, Technology, Engineering, and Mathematics Program (STEM), Department of Science and Technology (DOST) program, and Engineering and Science Education Program (ESEP).
- Regular Program, this is considered as the default program of the school. Elementary graduates from any DepEd accredited/recognized institution study core subjects.
- Special Program in the Arts (SPA), this program offers a comprehensive arts-based education to students with an inclination to the arts. The programs are listed below.
  - Dance
  - Visual Arts
  - Music
  - Creative writing
  - Theater Arts
  - Media Arts
- Special Program in the Sports (SPS), this program offers a comprehensive athletic-based education to students with an inclination to their sports. The programs are listed below.
  - Individual/dual sports:
    - Athletics
    - Badminton
    - Chess
    - Gymnastics
    - Table tennis
  - Team sports:
    - Basketball
    - Sepak takraw
    - Volleyball
- Special Program in Journalism (SPJ) is developed to enrich the experiences, hone the journalistic skills and competencies of student-writers and to strengthen free and responsible journalism. It is designed to develop the learners’ skills in mass communication, print, online and broadcast media. Its main focus is primarily on writing as a process and as an art.
- Special Education Program (SPED)/ Inclusive Education, this program serves to help students with disabilities by doing a more inclusive approach to education.
- Alternative Learning System (ALS), this program serves as an alternative mode of formal secondary education by providing education to those adults and out-of-school youths.

== Official Publication ==
- The Magi (English)
- Ang Tatlong Haring Mago (Filipino)
