= Patrick and Beatrice Haggerty Museum of Art =

Art museum in Wisconsin, United States

Haggerty Museum of Art
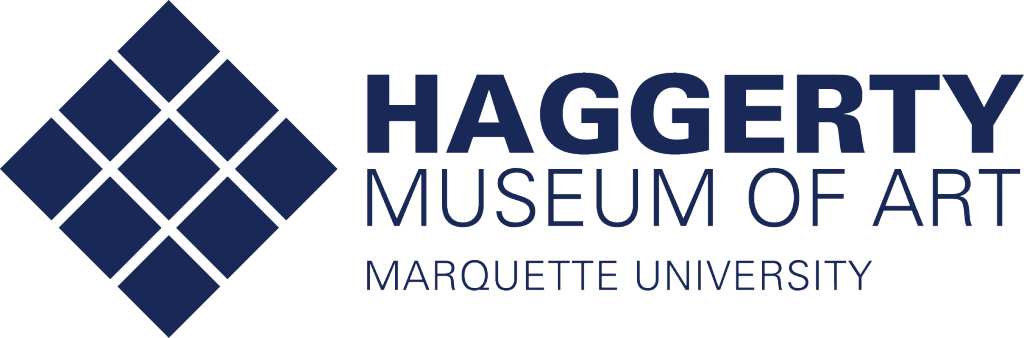

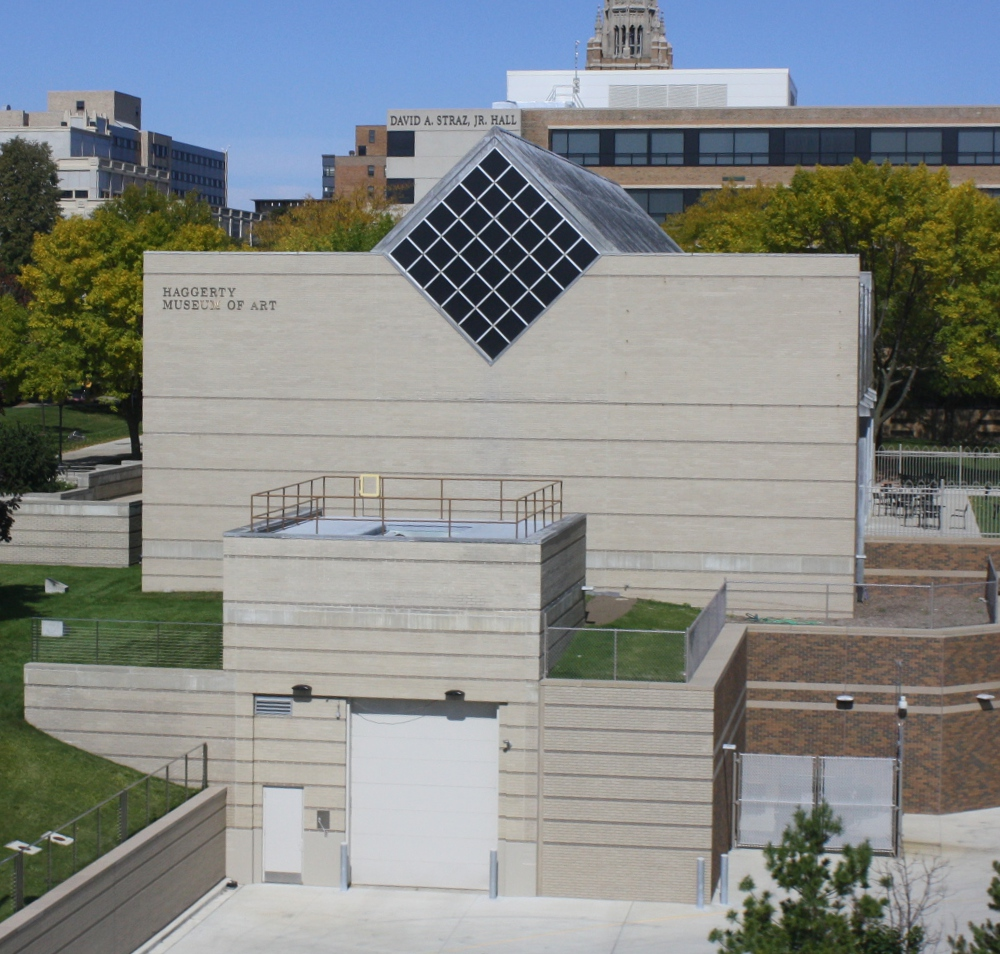
- The Haggerty Museum of Art on the campus of Marquette University
- Interactive fullscreen map
- Established: 1984; 42 years ago
- Location: 1234 W Tory Hill St; Milwaukee, Wisconsin; United States
- Coordinates: 43°02′13″N 87°55′40″W
- Type: Art museum
- Collection size: 10,000 works
- Visitors: 18,000 (2023)
- Director: John McKinnon
- Public transit access: MCTS 24, 30, CN1, RR3
- Website: www.marquette.edu/haggerty-museum/

The Patrick and Beatrice Haggerty Museum of Art, also referred to as the Haggerty Museum of Art or The Haggerty, is an art museum located on the campus of Marquette University in downtown Milwaukee, Wisconsin. The museum opened on November 11, 1984, following a collaborative effort chaired by professor Curtis L. Carter. As of 2025, its collection comprises about 10,000 works, a selection of which is on view on two levels of exhibition spaces totaling 5,246 sq. ft. (487 m^{2}).

Construction was made possible by a donation from alumnus and co-founder of Texas Instruments, Inc. Patrick E. Haggerty (1914–1980) and his wife Beatrice (1913–2003), for whom the museum is named. The building was originally designed by San Antonio architect O'Neil Ford. After Ford's death, the project was taken over by Milwaukee architect David Kahler.

American artist and social activist Keith Haring created a mural called Construction Fence, inspired by breakdancing, for the fence surrounding the building's construction site. The work was later relocated inside the galleries.

== Permanent collection ==
The Haggerty’s permanent collection includes approximately 10,000 works of art, with strength in European paintings of the late Renaissance and early modern eras, 20th-century German art, modern and contemporary photographs, and fine art prints by post-war and contemporary artists. Most of these objects can be viewed through the museum's online collection search.

Highlights include paintings by Pieter Claeissens, Charles-André van Loo, Gustave Caillebotte, Lovis Corinth, Diego Rivera, Salvador Dalí (The Madonna of Port Lligat), Jacob Lawrence, Jacques Villon, Andy Warhol; sculpture by Jean-Baptiste Carpeaux and Louise Nevelson; and works on paper by Otto Dix, Weegee, Robert Rauschenberg, and Marc Chagall (a set of 105 colored etchings known as The Bible Series donated by Patrick and Beatrice Haggerty).

== Gallery ==
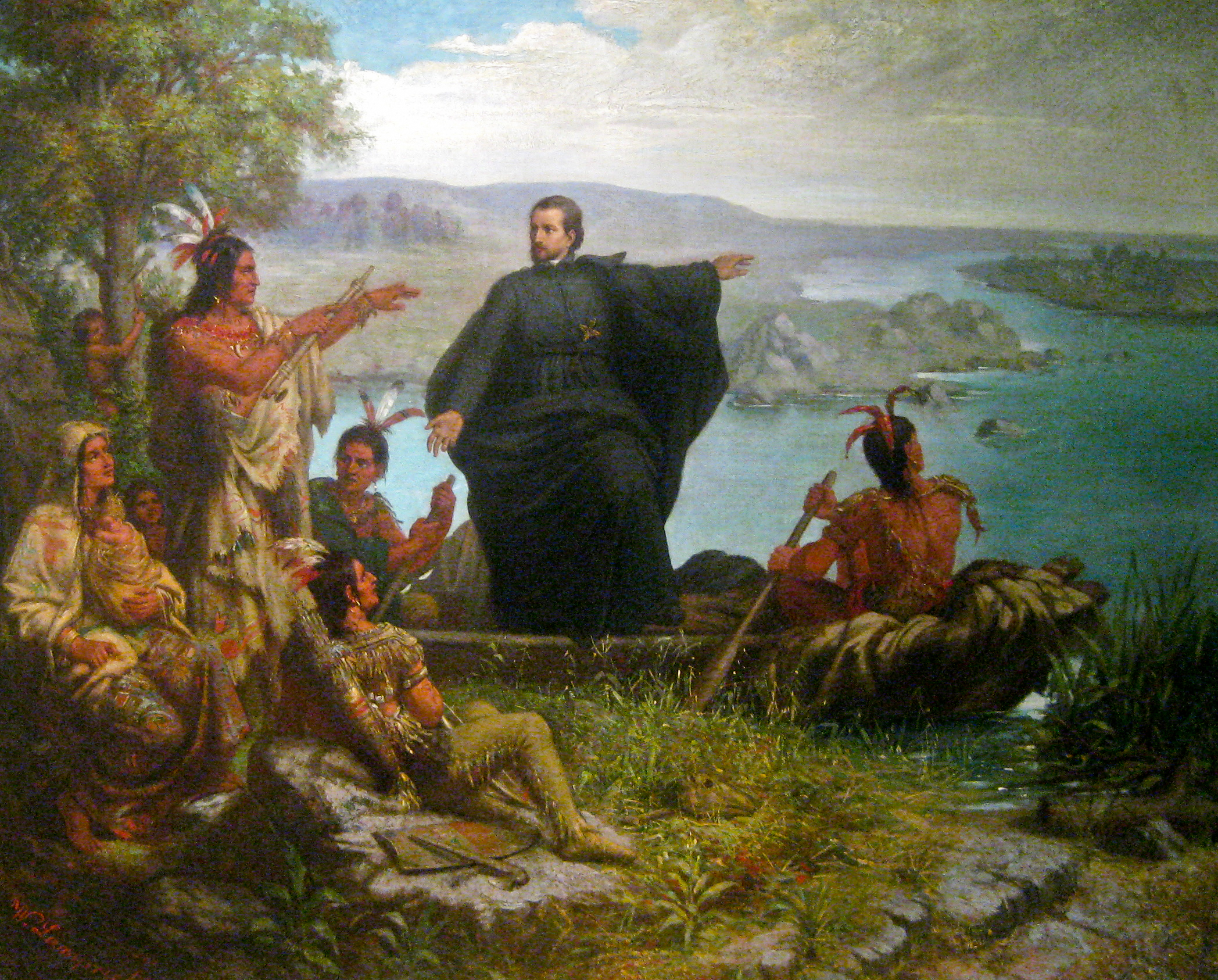
Wilhelm Lamprecht, Père Marquette and the Indians, 1869

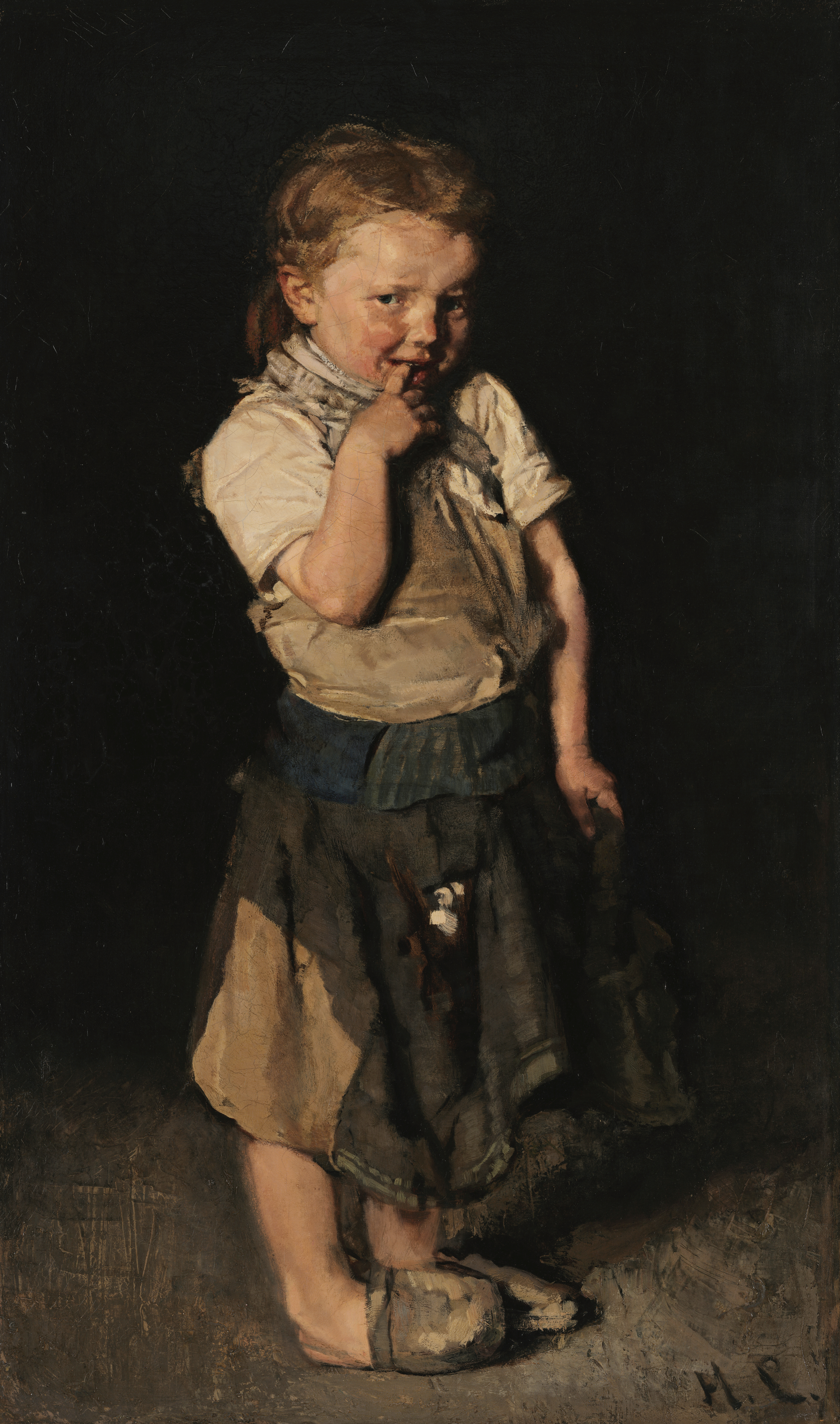
Max Liebermann, The Cobbler's Girl (Das Schustermädchen), 1871

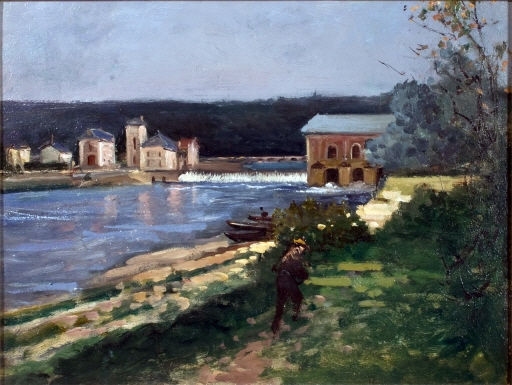
Gustave Caillebotte, La machine de Marly, 1875

== See also ==
- Construction Fence
- Ruins X
- Ex Stasis
