= Launch Enterprise Directorate =

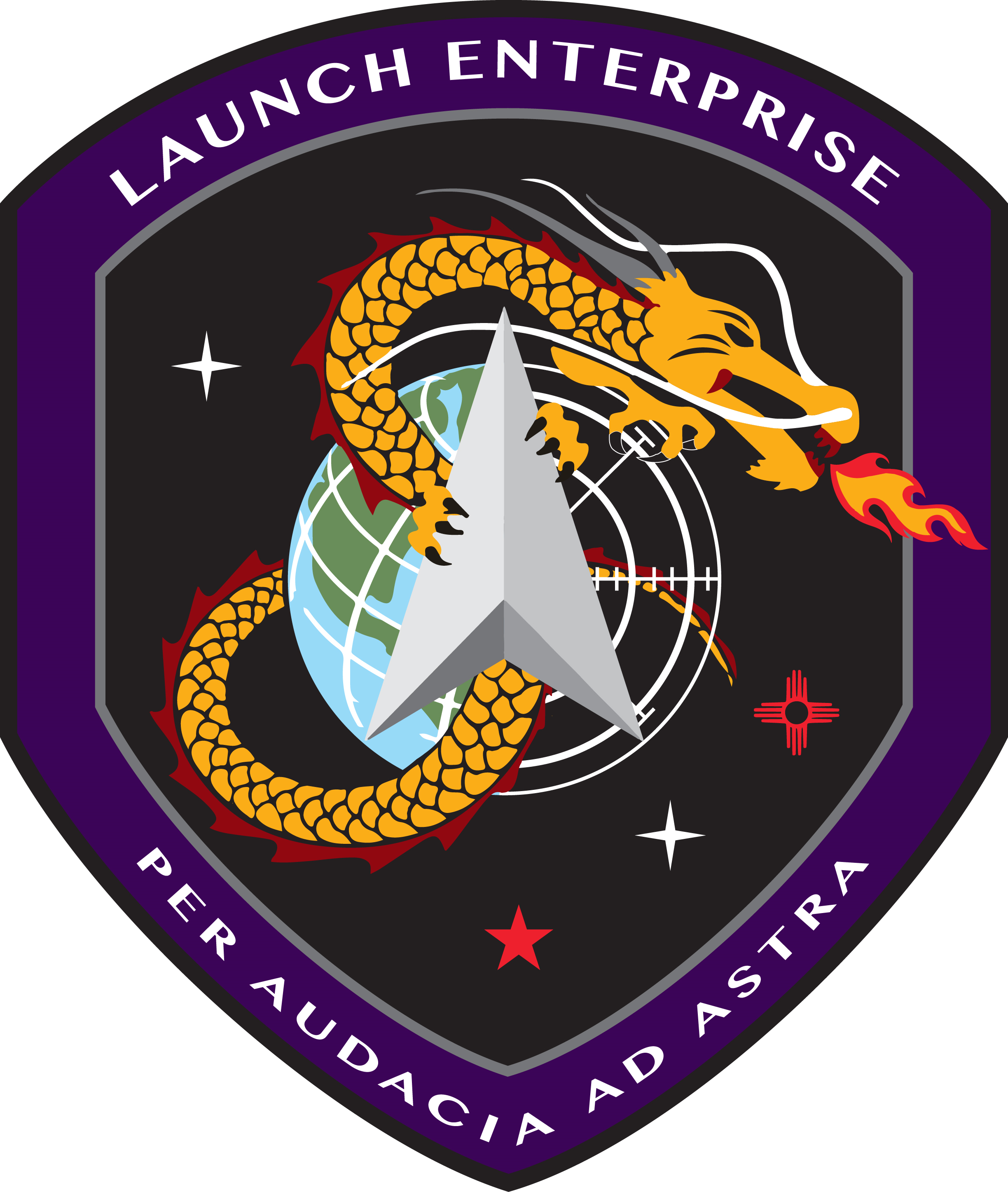
- Launch Enterprise Directorate emblem
- Active: 2015 – present
- Country: United States
- Branch: United States Space Force
- Part of: Space and Missile Systems Center

The United States Space Force's Launch Enterprise Directorate (LE) is a unit located at Los Angeles Air Force Base in El Segundo, California.

== Mission ==
The LE's mission is "to acquire, operate and sustain affordable expendable launch and range capability providing 100 percent mission success."

LE ensures Assured Access to Space for the Department of Defense through the Evolved Expendable Launch Vehicle (EELV) program.

== History ==
The Delta II rocket was developed when the Air Force decided to return to a mixed fleet of expendable launch vehicles following the Space Shuttle Challenger disaster and other launch failures. The Delta II entered the Air Force inventory in February 1987 after the Air Force awarded a contract to McDonnell Douglas for the construction of 18 Delta IIs to launch NAVSTAR Global Positioning System (GPS) satellites, which were originally programmed for Space Shuttle launch. The first Delta II launched a GPS satellite 14 Feb. 1989.

The EELV program is designed to improve our nation's access to space by making space launch vehicles more affordable and reliable. The program is replacing the existing launch system (Delta II) with two families of launch vehicles (Delta IV & Atlas V), each using common components and common infrastructure. EELV's operability improvements over current systems include a standard payload interface and increased off-pad processing. As the Air Force's space-lift modernization program, EELV was designed to reduce launch cost by at least 25 percent over heritage Atlas, Delta and Titan space launch systems.

LTRS consists of ground-based surveillance, navigation, flight operations and analysis, command and control, communications and weather assets located at the Eastern Range (Patrick AFB, FL.), and the Western Range (Vandenberg AFB, CA.). There are two major efforts underway for the LTRS program: modernization and sustainment. Modernization efforts seek to revamp and recapitalize current systems in the Instrumentation, Control and Display and Network segments. The current modernization efforts will replace approximately 20% of the system. Depot support projects enhance the existing systems on the ranges to reduce the operations and sustainment costs.

== Organization ==
LE, located at the Space and Missile Systems Center at Los Angeles Air Force Base, CA, is home to than 540 government, military, aerospace, and contractor personnel.

LE was briefly designated as the Launch and Range Systems Wing; however the unit was later re-designated as a directorate.

== List of directors ==
No.	Director		Term		
No.	Portrait	Name	Took office	Left office	Duration
1	Claire Leon	Claire Leon	14 October 2015	15 December 2017	2 years, 62 days
2	Robert Bongiovi	Colonel; Robert Bongiovi	15 December 2017	13 August 2021	3 years, 241 days
