= Curtis L. Carter =

American philosopher

Curtis L. Carter is a professor of Philosophy at Marquette University, focusing on aesthetics. He received a PhD from the University of Boston. His greatest accomplishment at Marquette was the creation of the Patrick and Beatrice Haggerty Museum of Art. Carter was the founding director from 1984 to 2007. Haggerty Museum attempts to build a greater appreciation for the arts in the Milwaukee and Marquette Community. He also teaches several classes on the philosophy of art.

Carter also serves as an associate professor at Marquette University's Les Aspin Center in Washington, DC. At the Aspin Center, Carter teaches a class titled "Arts in a Democratic Society", through which he attempts to integrate the importance of the arts in a democratic society. The class consists of tours of art museums, historical landmarks and buildings in the DC area, visits to performances at the Kennedy Center. Carter currently serves as vice president of the International Association for Aesthetics. Carter has recently expanded his teaching to China.
