= Serra de Rubió =

Mountain range in Spain

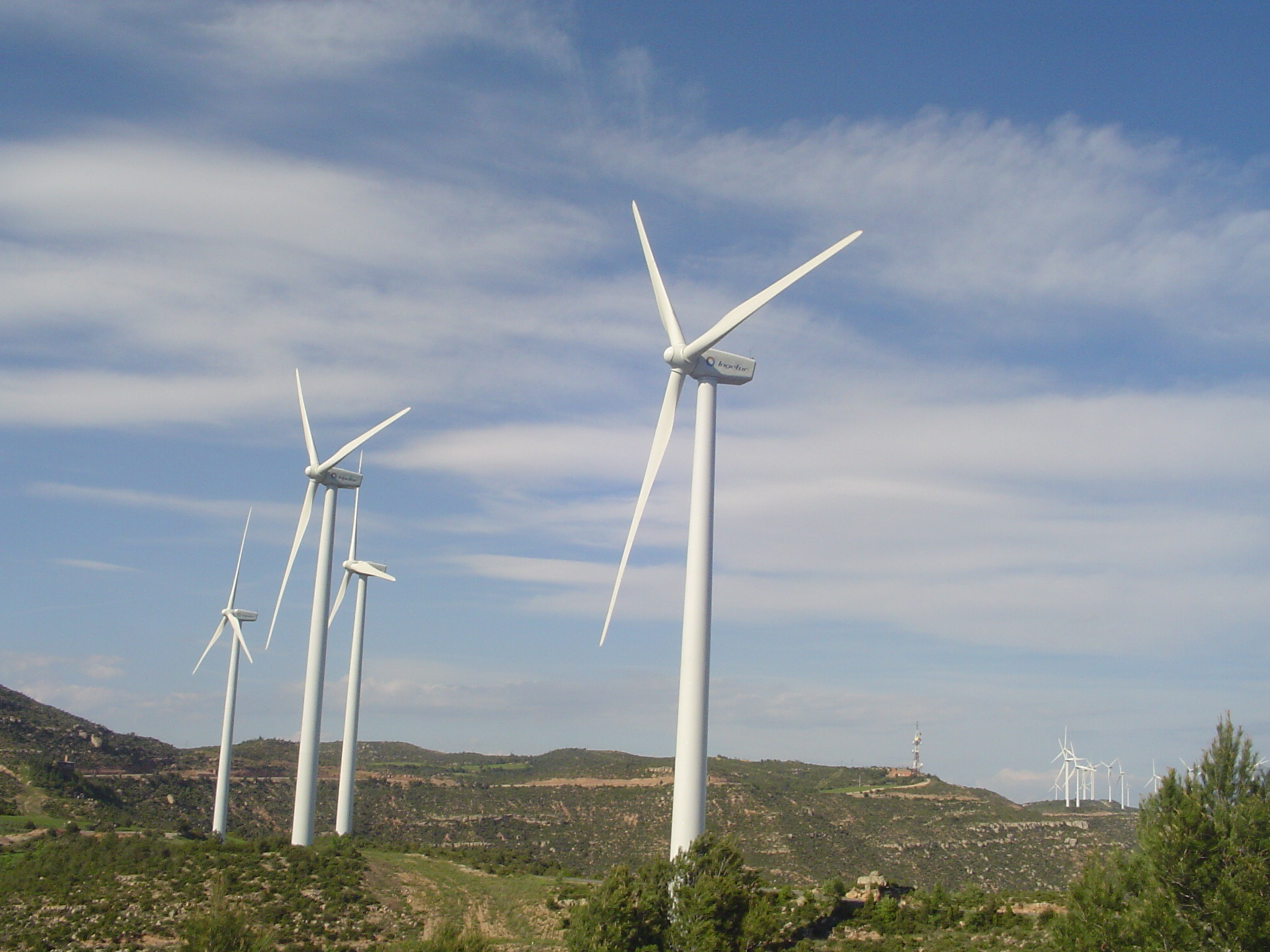

Highest point
- Peak: Còpia de Palomes
- Elevation: 847 m (2,779 ft)
- Coordinates: 41°39′36.41″N 1°37′11.64″E

Dimensions
- Length: 12 km (7.5 mi) E/W
- Width: 9 km (5.6 mi) N/S

Geography
- Location within Pyrenees
- Country: Spain
- Province: Barcelona, Catalonia
- Counties: Anoia and Bages

Geology
- Orogeny: Alpine orogeny
- Rock age: Jurassic
- Rock type: Limestone

The Serra de Rubió is a mountain range located in Catalonia, Spain, between the comarques of Anoia and Bages, and among the municipalities of Rubió, Castellfollit del Boix, Òdena and Els Prats de Rei. Its highest peak is the Còpia de Palomes, with an elevation of 837-metre-high (2,746 ft). It has a length of roughly 12-kilometre (39,370 ft), and 9-kilometre (29,528 ft) of width.

The landscape of the surroundings is characterized by woods of Aleppo pine (Pinus halepensis), the predominant species in almost all the mountain range. However, also the Austrian Pine (Pinus nigra) stands out, mostly in the wet areas in the bottom of the valleys but also in the shady spots, by the side of the Scots Pine (Pinus sylvestris), which is less abundant and lies mostly in some shady spots higher than 700-metre-high (2,297 ft). Oaks and holm oaks are abundant as well. Regarding fauna, the main animal species are the roe deer (Capreolus capreolus), the wild boar (Sus scrofa), the red fox (Vulpes vulpes), the European rabbit (Oryctolagus cuniculus) and the European hare (Lepus europaeus).

The population in the range is scarce, since live there around 200 people. People live in masies (country houses), which are dispersed by all the territory. Moreover, there are some chapels also dispersed: the main ones are Santa Maria de Rubió and Sant Martí de Maçana, but also stands out the Romanic chapel of Sant Pere d'Ardesa.

There is a wind farm in the mountain range, the Serra de Rubió Wind Farm, which is the biggest in Catalonia and has round 50 wind turbines. The Marimon i Casulleres rock shelter, a big rock shelter where hided two known bandits in the area, is located in the mountain range. Besides, a mountain retreat called Refugi Mas del Tronc lies in the northern slope of the Serra de Rubió, where crosses the GR7 path.

== Topography ==
The highest peaks in the Serra de Rubió are the following ones:

| Peaks | Altitude (m) |
|---|---|
| Còpia de Palomes | 837 |
| Les Tres Alzines | 831 |
| El Pujol | 702 |
| L'Avellanet | 782 |
| El Morrocurt | 751 |
| Puig de Sant Miquel | 733 |
| Turó de Maçana | 703 |
