= Marimon i Casulleres rock shelter =

Cave in Spain

Marimon i Casulleres rock shelter Cal Perdiu rock shelter
- Balma d'en Marimon i Casulleres; Balma de Cal Perdiu (Catalan)
- Cal Perdiu rock shelter
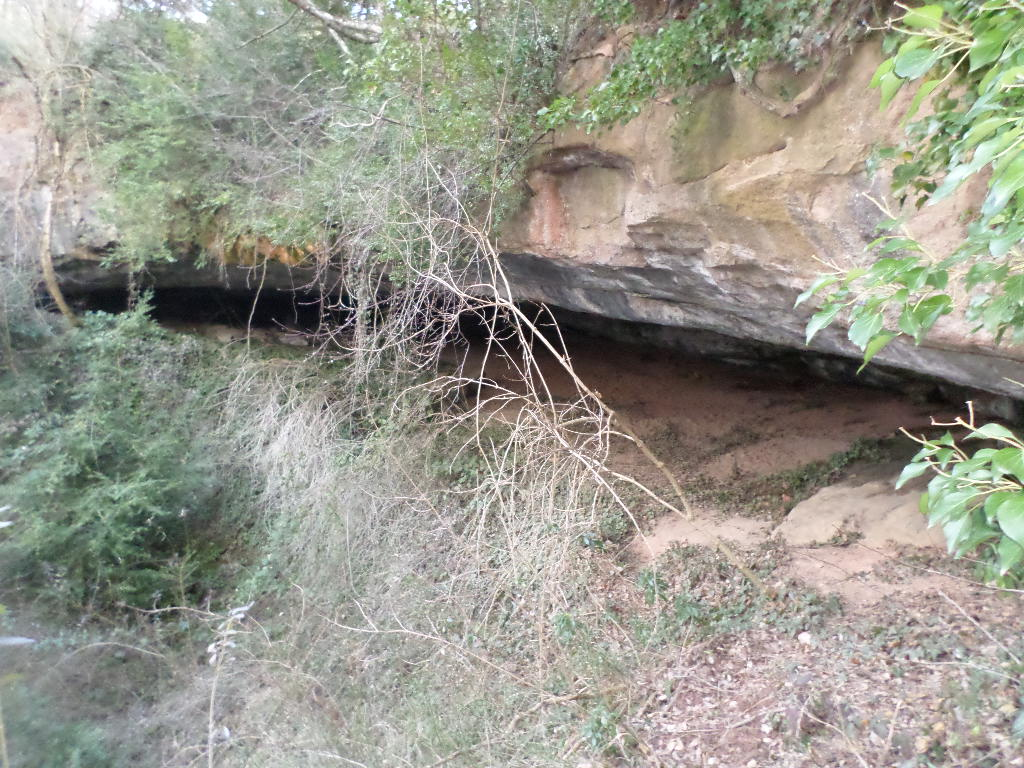
- The front of the rock shelter in 2015

- Location in Spain Marimon i Casulleres rock shelter (Catalonia)
- 41°40′37″N 1°35′54″E
- Associated with: Marimon and Casulleres
- Location: near Cal Perdiu, municipality of Rubió
- Region: Catalonia

Site notes
- Elevation: 680 m (2,230 ft)

The Marimon i Casulleres rock shelter (Catalan: Balma d'en Marimon i Casulleres), also named Cal Perdiu rock shelter (Catalan: Balma de Cal Perdiu), is a rock shelter located in the Serra de Rubió, in the north of the municipality of Rubió, in Catalonia, Spain. It is known for being the hiding place of the bandits Marimon and Casulleres, after who the rock shelter is named.

It is considered to be a large rock shelter. In the entrance, its height is round 2 metres (7 ft), and the length from the entrance until its deepest point is round 10 metres (33 ft). The rock shelter is surrounded by a pine forest composed mostly of Austrian pine (Pinus nigra). However, there are many other species into the wood that make the rock shelter not visible from a few metres afar, and this forest keeps the rock shelter camouflaged. During rainy seasons, there is a lot of humidity into it. That is why there are stalactites in formation in there, which drop drops of water.

The access to the rock shelter is only possible afoot, through a path that starts not far from the Cal Perdiu county house, which lies less than 1 kilometre (3,281 ft) away from the rock shelter. It is possible to drive by car until Cal Perdiu, through a gravel road that starts in the BV-1031 road. The drawn route most frequented to access to the cave starts in the Mas del Tronc Shelter, where the long-travel path GR-7 goes through. The route is a round-trip that go through the Serra de Rubió Wind Farm as well, which is close to the cave. The church of Sant Martí de Maçana lies about 2 kilometres (6,562 ft) away from it.
