= Sant Martí de Maçana =

Maçana
- Entity of Population
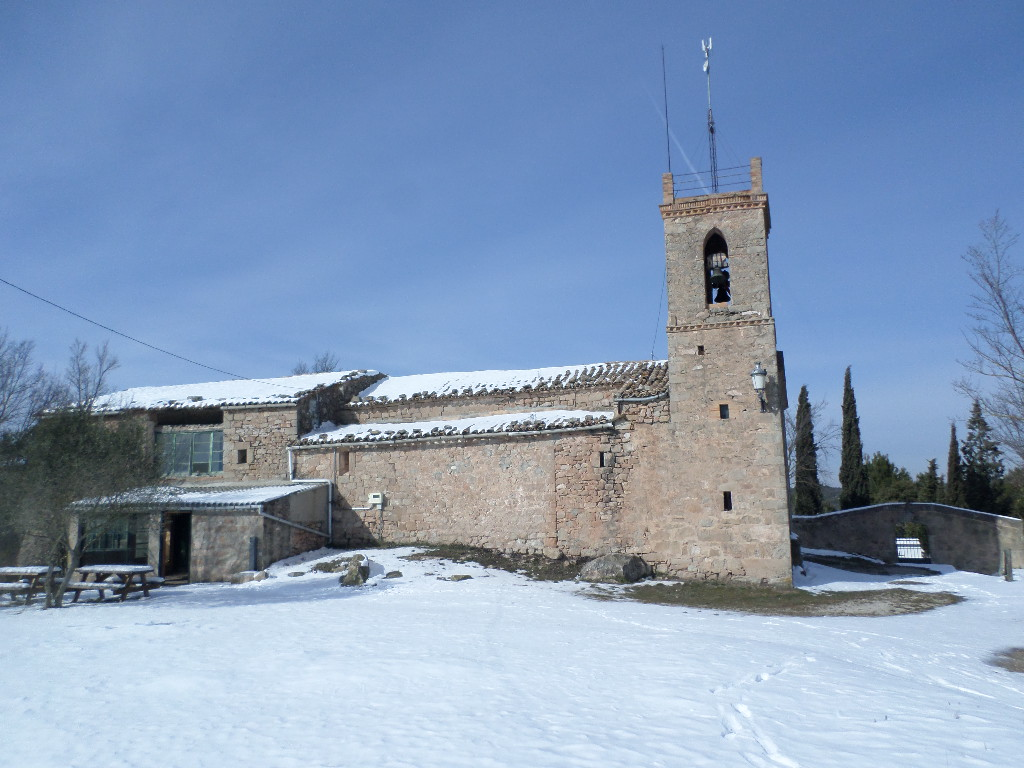
- Church of Sant Martí de Maçana

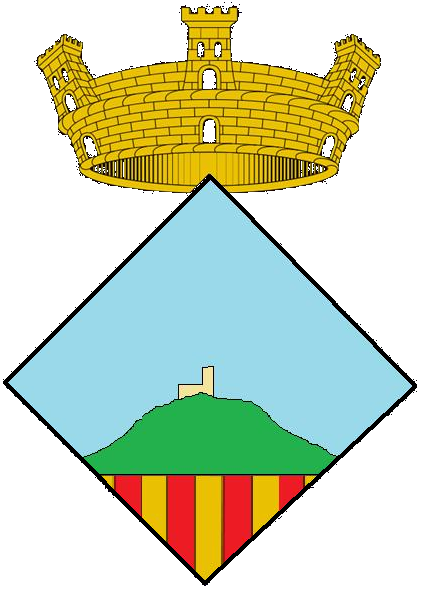
- Coat of arms

- Location in Catalonia Maçana (Spain)
- Coordinates: 41°41′13″N 1°36′12″E
- Country: Spain
- Autonomous community: Catalonia
- Province: Barcelona
- Comarca: Anoia

Area
  - Total: 24 km^{2} (9.3 sq mi)
- Elevation: 703 m (2,306 ft)

Population (2014)
  - Total: 39
  - Density: 1.6/km^{2} (4.2/sq mi)
- Time zone: UTC+1 (CET)
  - Summer (DST): UTC+2 (CEST)

Sant Martí de Maçana, or simply Maçana, is a small village situated in the municipality of Rubió, in the comarca of the Anoia, Catalonia. It is bordered to the north by Aguilar de Segarra and Els Prats de Rei, to the east by Castellfollit del Boix, to the south by Òdena and Rubió, and to the west by Els Prats de Rei and Rubió. Maçana is located on the north of the Serra de Rubió mountain range, in the valley of the Maçana river, tributary of the Llobregat river. The village was formed by the different farms that are found around the hermitage of Sant Martí. It has a population of 39 inhabitants, as of 2014.

== Name and history ==
The main theory about the origin of the name "Maçana" is that it comes from the Latin Mathiana, which means "apple". This name first appeared documented in 990. Also used until 1980 was the form Massana, and during the Francoist Spain the name used was San Martín de Masana. During the 10th century there was a castle, possibly under the mandate of Saint Iscle.

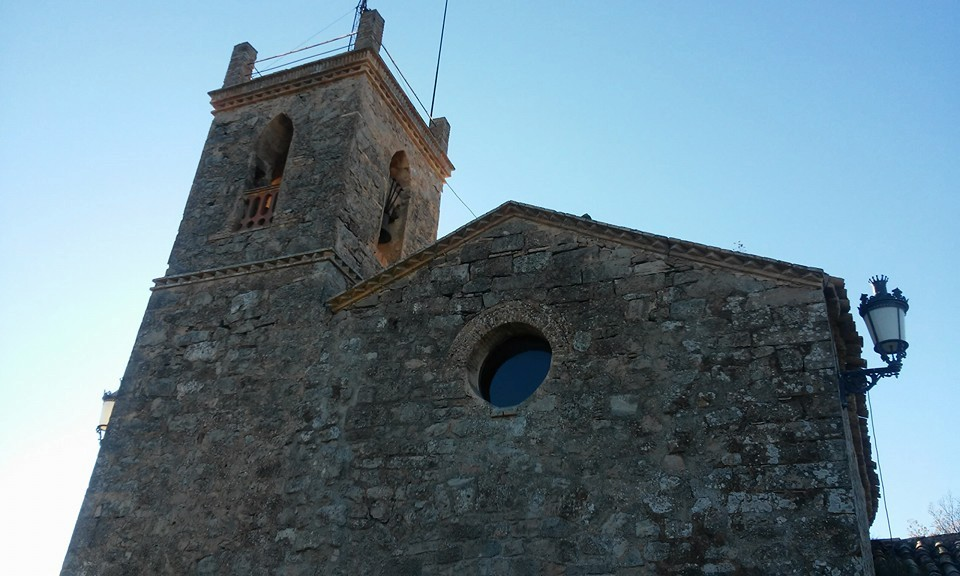
Tower of Maçana Church.

The church of Saint Martin, of Romanesque origin, was completely renovated in the seventeenth century without leaving too many traces of the Romanesque style. The old town of Maçana was annexed to that of Rubió in 1840.

=== Coat of arms ===
The coat of arms of Maçana was established on 15 November 2014, in spite of not being officially recognized. The crown represents the Maçana Hill with the church of Saint Martin in the peak, and on the inferior part there is the Senyera.

=== Church of Sant Martí de Maçana ===
Sant Martí de Maçana is mentioned as a parish in 1154, within the old term of the Maçana castle (now defunct). First, it was dedicated to Saint Martin of Tours, but then, in the 14th century, it was dedicated to Saint Acisclus. Its architecture is in the plan of a Latin cross and covered with a pointed vault. Nowadays, the pattern of the church is of Saint Martin and Saint Mark. Externally it is covered with a gabled roof and has a quadrangular bell attached to the church. Between 1975 and 1981 the church was restored. Also attached to the building is the rectory dating from 1736. The town cemetery is next to the church. (2306 ft).

=== Festivities ===
There are two traditional festivities in Maçana, in Spring and in Autumn. The Autumn one is held on the nearest Sunday to 11 November, Saint Martin's day, patron of the church. Firstly the mass is held in the church, then a dance in the afternoon, and the raffle of a traditional cake, called "La Toia". The Spring celebration is larger and is held on the nearest Sunday to 25 April, Saint Mark's day, second patron of the church. Again a mass in the morning, and the raffle of a cake, plus the distribution of the bread, and also a classical game called Conill Porquí (guinea pig).

=== Geography ===
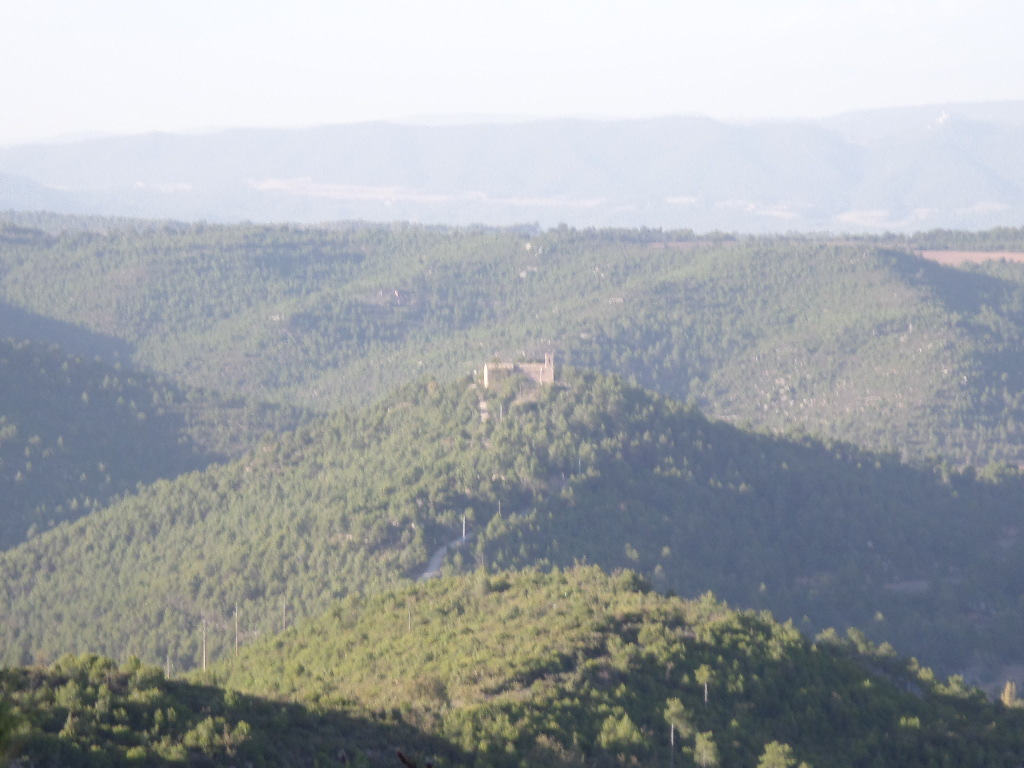
The Maçana Hill.

Maçana is situated to the south of the natural comarca of the Alta Segarra, on the north slope of the Serra de Rubió. Its geography is very rugged, formed by some of the valleys of the Serra de Rubió. The centre is the Turó de Maçana. The Còpia de Palomes, of 837 metres (2746 ft), the highest peak of Rubió, is situated to the northwest of Maçana. The river of Maçana, has several tributaries to the north of Serra de Rubió, which end in the river Cardener.

=== Fauna ===
The fauna of Maçana is very diverse. Animals include the boar, the squirrel, the rabbit, the hare, the fox, the deer and the roe deer. There are also many varieties of birds.

== Notable residents ==
- Josep Ferrer Bujons: writer, poet, and Catalan linguist, who was born in Maçana in 1959.
