= Grevalosa =

- Singular population entity
- Location within Spain Location within Catalonia Location within Province of Barcelona
- Coordinates: 41°40′53.0″N 1°38′59.9″E
- Country: Spain
- A. community: Catalunya
- Province: Barcelona
- Municipality: Castellfollit del Boix

Population (January 1, 2024)
  - Total: 18
- Time zone: UTC+01:00
- Postal code: 08255
- MCN: 08059000200

Grevalosa is a singular population entity in the municipality of Castellfollit del Boix, in Catalonia, Spain.

As of 2024 it has a population of 18 people.
