= Maians (disambiguation) =

Maians is a village in Spain. It may also refer to:

- Maians (island), Spain
- Maians, an extraterrestrial people in the video game Perfect Dark
