= Josep Ferrer i Bujons =

Spanish writer (born 1959)

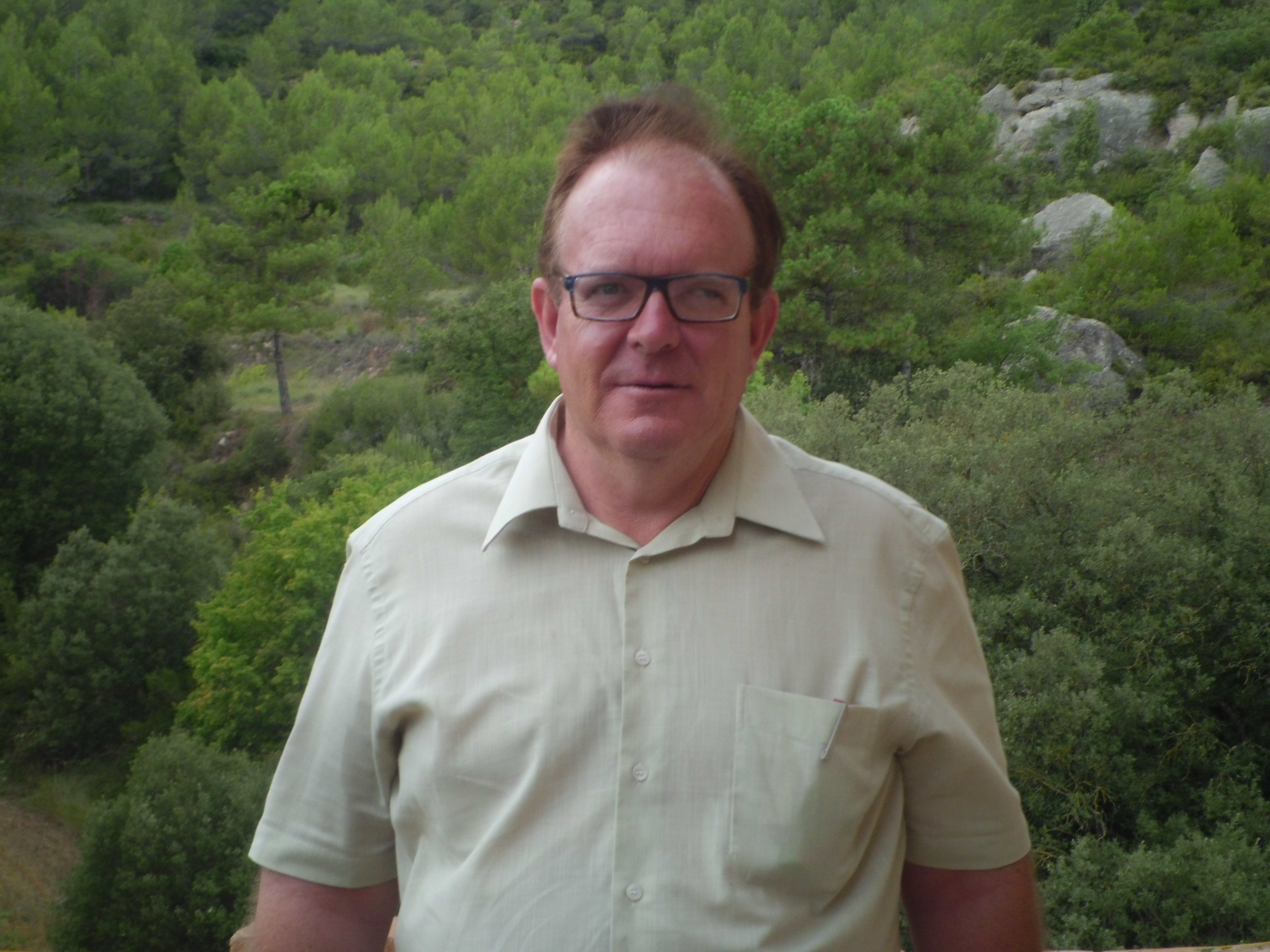
- Born: 12 May 1959 (age 66); Rubió, Catalonia, Spain
- Occupations: Poet, writer and Catalan linguist
- Years active: 1980–1999
- Known for: Writing four books of poetry and a novel

Josep Ferrer i Bujons (born in Sant Martí de Maçana, Rubió, 12 May 1959) is a Catalan linguist, author, poet and professor graduate in Catalan Philology. He has written five books, of which the first four are compilations of poems.

Ferrer has been corrector and editor of the weekly local newspaper La Veu de l'Anoia and he also has collaborated in the Anoia edition of Regió 7, another Catalan local newspaper. He has also been professor of Catalan language and literature in some high schools of Secondary education in Central Catalonia. Likewise, Ferrer is a co-founder of the magazine Revista d'Igualada (2nd period). Ferrer has also published several opinion articles in a local digital newspaper, Anoiadiari.cat. Nowadays, he works as a corrector at the Catalan language edition of El Periódico de Catalunya, the best-selling newspaper in Catalonia.

Regarding writing, Ferrer published four books of poems the decades of the 1980s and 1990s and a novel in 1999. Also he obtained a prize in 1987, for Les fulles de la tardor (The leaves of Autumn), prize conceded in the city of Igualada.
