= Canyelles =

Canyelles may refer to:

- Canyelles (town), a town in the province of Barcelona, Catalonia, Spain
- Canyelles (neighbourhood), a neighbourhood in the city of Barcelona, Catalonia, Spain
- Canyelles (Barcelona Metro), a metro station in the city of Barcelona, Catalonia, Spain
- Canyelles, Castellfollit del Boix, a singular population entity in Castellfollit del Boix, Spain
