= Permanyer =

- Singular population entity
- Location within Spain Location within Catalonia Location within Province of Barcelona
- Coordinates: 41°38′27.5″N 1°40′21.0″E
- Country: Spain
- A. community: Catalunya
- Province: Barcelona
- Municipality: Castellfollit del Boix

Population (January 1, 2024)
  - Total: 21
- Time zone: UTC+01:00
- Postal code: 08255
- MCN: 08059000600

Permanyer is a singular population entity in the municipality of Castellfollit del Boix, in Catalonia, Spain.

As of 2024 it has a population of 21 people.
