= The Farm (Miró) =

Painting by Joan Miró

- La Masia (Catalan)
- Artist: Joan Miró
- Year: 1921–1922
- Medium: Oil on canvas
- Dimensions: 123.8 cm × 141.3 cm (48.7 in × 55.6 in)
- Location: National Gallery of Art, Washington, D.C.
- Accession: 1987.18.1

The Farm is an oil painting made by Joan Miró between the summer of 1921 in Mont-roig del Camp and winter 1922 in Paris. It is a kind of inventory of the masia (traditional Catalan farmhouse) owned by his family since 1911 in the town of Mont-roig del Camp. Miró himself regarded this work as a key in his career, describing it as "a summary of my entire life in the countryside" and "the summary of one period of my work, but also the point of departure for what was to follow." It now resides in the National Gallery of Art in Washington DC, where it was given in 1987 by Mary Hemingway, coming from the private collection of American writer Ernest Hemingway, who had described it by saying, “It has in it all that you feel about Spain when you are there and all that you feel when you are away and cannot go there. No one else has been able to paint these two very opposing things.”

== History ==
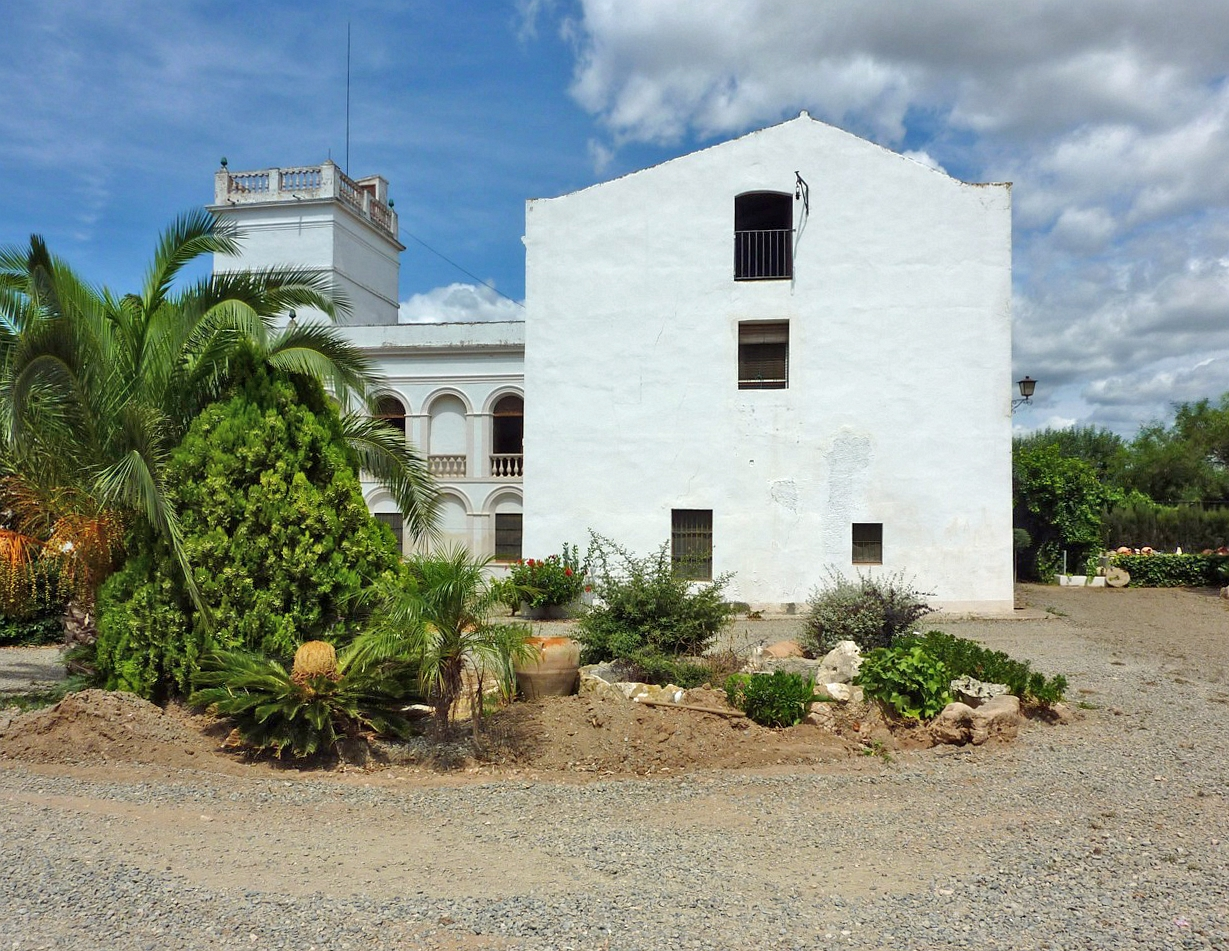
Main view of Mas Miró, the family farmhouse of Joan Miró.

The painter, though born in Barcelona, was always linked with the rural world, especially the town of Mont-roig del Camp, and his early works show an influence of the landscapes and characters in their summer country views in the land of Tarragona. Miró captured this relationship with the land in such paintings produced between 1918 and 1924 as Vegetable Garden with Donkey(1918) or Montroig, the church and the people(1919). The Farm was started on Miró's first trip back to Mont-roig del Camp from France, and was completed in Paris. It was a time when Miró was established in Paris and alternated with some travels, especially summers in Mont-Roig.

The observation of everything around him and the lights on the rocks and trees, that changed at certain times with the brightness of the sun, made the artist feel bound to the elemental Earth, of which was said:

...[it] is essential to have your feet firmly resting on the ground to lift into flight through the air when painting ... [One] has to walk on the land because, through the limbs, it communicates its force.

—

By economic necessity, Miró began visiting various art dealers to sell this painting. Léonce Rosenberg, among others who took care of the paintings of Picasso, agreed to have it in storage at any time and at the insistence of Miró, he seriously suggested dividing the canvas into small pieces to make it easier to sell. Miró, angry, picked up the canvas and took it to his workshop. Then, he took it to Jacques Viot, of the Pierre Gallery, who, after a few attempts, sold it to the writer Ernest Hemingway, for five thousand French francs. Hemingway wrote in 1934 in the journal Cahiers d'art, "I won't exchange The Farm for any painting in the world"

Miró later would use the area of Mont-Roig in other works such as Earth and Worker or Catalan Landscape (The Hunter). In them, as in The Farm, can be observed succession in the transformation of figurative forms to other places, where there are all kinds of symbol and graphics.

=== History for Miró ===
Miró was the first reporter on the story of his artwork:

Nine months of hard work! Nine months (curiously, the same as the human gestation) every day painting and erasing it and doing studies and returning to destroy them! The house was the summary of my life (spiritual and poetic) in the field. From a large tree to a small snail, I wanted to put everything I loved in the field. I think it's foolish to give more value to a mountain than to an ant (and these landscapers do not know) and therefore I did not hesitate to pass my hours to give life to the ant. During the nine months I worked there worked in the artwork I did it for seven or eight hours a day. I suffered terribly, like a condemned. I erased a lot. I began to get rid of foreign influences to get in touch with Catalonia.[...] In Paris, back to work again in the canvas, I realized immediately that something wasn't working.[...] Could not paint the herbs of Mont-Roig del Camp from the Boulogne woods, and to continue the painting I ended up asking to be sent authentic herbs of Mont-Roig del Camp inside an envelope. They got all dry, of course. But at least with these flowers, I could continue the work.[...] When I finished ... no dealer wanted to get the painting nor even take a look at it. I wrote a lot of people and nothing happened. Plandiura, whom I also offered, didn't want to know anything. By late Rosenberg, probably for engagement with Picasso, accepted having it on deposit at home [...] and there was left a few time [...] He made me this statement: "You know that Paris people currently are living in smaller rooms every day, because the crisis is passed.? [...] Well, why not do something? We could make this material into eight pieces and then sell it to small ... "Rosenberg spoke seriously. After a couple of months I removed the canvas from Rosenberg's and took it to my workshop, living with her in the midst of misery.

— Joan Miró

The building of the house belonging to the Miró family, Mas Miró, was declared a Cultural Asset of National Interest in 2006. After years of paperwork between the family and various public institutions, they did an agreement to make the project an active museum, where the painter's personal items will be displayed in addition to the recreation of their most important works, including The Farm through prints that show the quality and texture of the oil paintings. According to statements made by the grandson of the artist Emilio Fernandez Miró, "In addition both the Barcelona Joan Miró Foundation and the family yield original works. The house is full of graffitis, which my grandfather used as drafts for his works [...] We want it to be a living museum. We will be providing it with works in rotation."

== Description ==
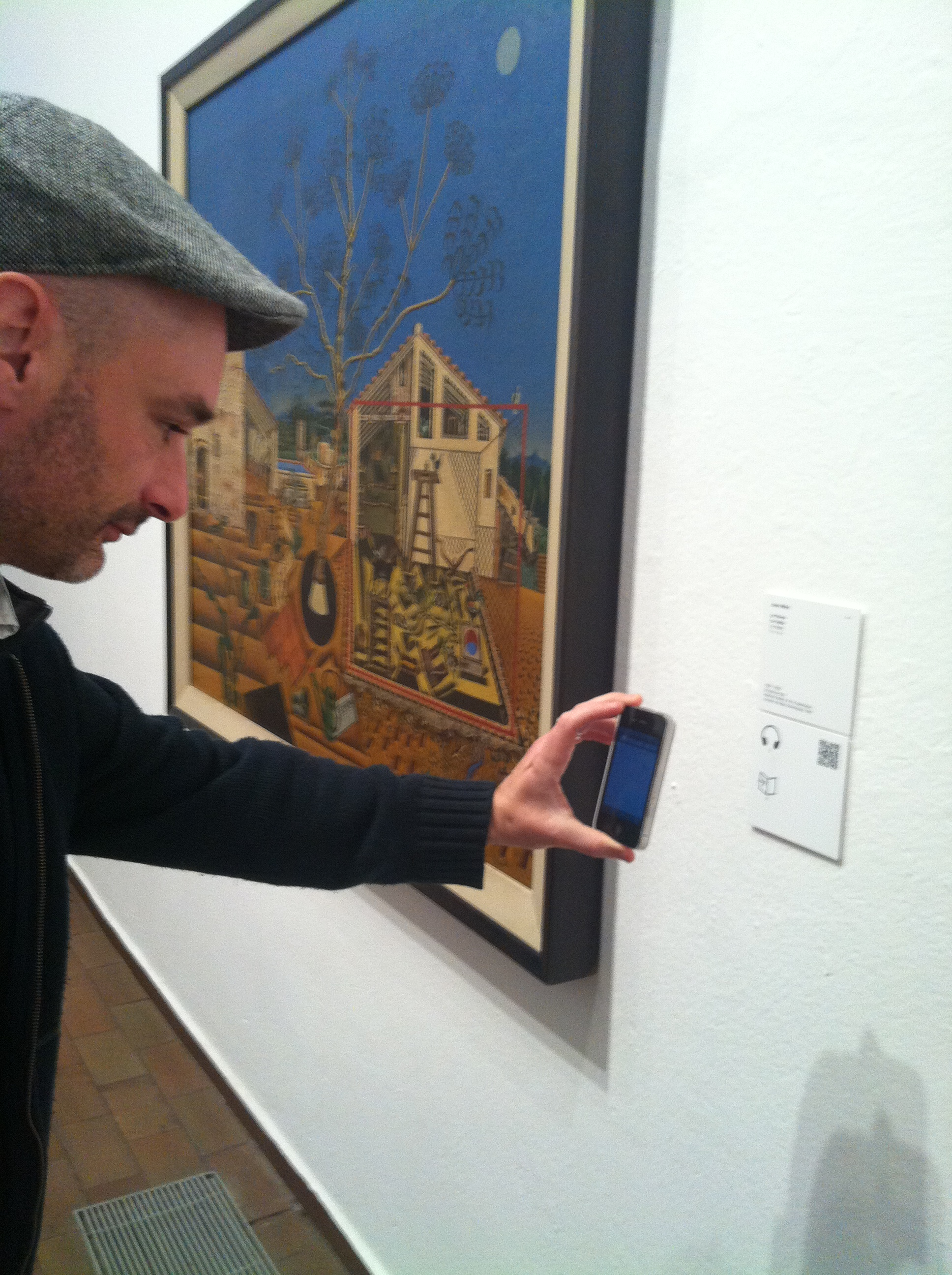
The Farm is described using this article and similar articles from Wikipedia using QRpedia codes.

The Farm is the culminating work of the "detailist" period of Joan Miró, made when he was 29 years old, and James J. Sweeney considered as "key work of the artist's later development." He worked on it for nine months of tough preparation. The mythical relationship with the land held by Miró is summarized in this table, the graphic nature of naive and unrealistic of all objects: the animals are domestic, plants are the ones that the man works and objects are all of daily use and necessary for the home. Learn all the details to a minimum, is called the "Miró handwriting" starting point for the following years of his contact with surrealism.

The painting denotes all the familiarity that was represented with Miró. It is made in a place where you can see the daily activities of a farmhouse and the characteristics of the building objects and animals. The clear definition of the drawings can easily achieves the recognition of all without causing any confusion. Like a stock shows a mule, some chickens, a dog, a goat, a rabbit, snails, insects and lizards, most isolated and most of them placed on any object that ago as a display on pedestals, the possibility of union between the object and animal piece by Braque "says justification" and get moving among the other elements of the work depicted. The building of the house includes the crevices and cracks in the plastered wall. In the center of the painting is a large eucalyptus born of a black circle, which contrasts with the white circle representing the Sun from the sky. All elements of this painting, animals and objects came to be in the form of prototypes symbol that would appear in several works by Miró, for example one of the most common is the ladder representing evasion.

Calling the work "Miró's climactic masterpiece," American critic Arthur Danto wrote,

"The Farm is energized by two incompatible artistic realities, corresponding to the polarities of Miró's life. It has the obsessive documentation of visual reality that we find in primitive painting: each leaf on the dominating eucalyptus tree is separately painted, each rock in the stony field to the right is given an autonomous space, each blade of grass is given its own identity. . . The barking dog, the rabbit, the snail, the cock, the donkey, the dove, the pail, the watering can, the wagon, the plow, the dozens of farm implements, the farmer's wife, the baby by the wash trough, are each suspended in the shadowless clarity of a metaphysical illumination — it is the kind of light one gets through an optical instrument. . . It is as though the artist had intermixed, in a single work, the illusory space of traditional landscape with the shallow space of Cubism, so that everything is on the surface and at the same time bears no relation to the surface, which, after all, is not part of the landscape...No one who knows great painting can look at it without sensing the divided consciousness and the aesthetic indeterminacy of an artist who sank into his art the oppositions of his vision: Catalan and Parisian, traditionalist and Cubist, naif and cosmopolite."

=== Analysis ===
Several historians and art critics have given their opinion on this reference work:

It comes completely perfect Miró, connects for a moment with the statement, which is prayer, Maragall: why another cell, if this land is so beautiful? "The error" before introducing the deep shadow of the artist thought was concitat the moment. The house is the terrestrial sky. In it, the roosters argue the lyricism, the tree raises the strength of the instinct to drink the astral light, which is not known whether the sun or the moon. Despite its transparent walls and absolute clarity the mysteries of what makes it accessible and far unfathomable that are the immediate things. Each line is a blow to the spirit, a joy each vertex, each built up a world to live happily in it. There is an atmosphere of ecstasy Taoist in this house that matches the Catalan peace on earth.

— Juan-Eduardo Cirlot Laporta, Joan Miró

Miró carried out with discretion and a perfect means of incredible accuracy, poetic and artistic experience that will raise the limits of the painting and the heart of this whole imaginary this truly surreal reality, the surrealists did not get to know and they rub only the periphery.

— Jacques Dupin, Miró''

It was through this new vocabulary of signs that Miró was finally realize his poetic conception of the Catalan countryside, detached from politics and debates about the cultural situation of modern art. At a time when the beleaguered and vanguard estaba where the idea of the Mediterranean was used to reinforce political positions, ideological and rhetorical, Miró tried to consolidate a new kind of alliance between form and content in their archetypal images of a Catalonia primitive. With The House from 1921 to 1922, Miró laid bare his own house (or inside the poetic) in the field of Tarragona and cataloged the contents with unprecedented clarity and precision ...

— Robert Lubar, The Mediterranean Miró : conceptions of identity

Personally, I have no doubt in saying that The Farm represents for our nation Catalan the same as The Guernika represents for our diverse Spain, for the uniqueness and richness of spiritual values, that both works possess and transmit to the members of their communities of origin and of all humanity.

— Saturnino Pescador, Joan Miró: hidden intentionality of his life and work

== Ernest Hemingway and The Farm ==
The American writer Ernest Hemingway bought Miró's painting as a birthday present for his wife, Hadley; after paying off the last installment of the 5,000 francs it cost, he brought The Farm home: "In the open taxi the wind caught the big canvas as though it were a sail, and we made the taxi driver crawl along." Hemingway later said, "No one could look at it and not know it had been painted by a great painter."

== Exhibits ==
Year	Exhibition	Place	City	Ref
1922	Salon d'Automne	Grand Palais	Paris	
1923	Exposició de pintures i dibuixos de Joan Miró i Francesc Domingo	Au Cameleon	Paris	
1923	Conference of A.Schoneber The evolution of the Catalan Poetry	Au Cameleon	Paris	
1925	Joan Miró	Pierre Gallery	Paris	
1934	A Century of Progress Exhibition of Painting and Sculpture	Art Institute of Chicago	Chicago	
1935	Joan Miró, 1933-1934: Painting, gouache, pastels	Pierre Matisse Gallery	New York City	
1948	Picasso, Miró, Gris. Teachers of Spanish painting of the twentieth century	San Francisco Museum of Art and Portland Art Museum	San Francisco and Portland, OR	
1959	Joan Miró	MoMA and Los Angeles County Museum of Art	New York City and Los Angeles	
1960	Permanent collection	MoMA	New York	
1964	Joan Miró	Tate Gallery and Kunsthaus Zurich	London i Zurich	
1978	Aspects of Twentieth-Century Art	National Gallery of Art	Washington DC	
1980	Miró: Selected paintings	Hirshhorn Museum; Sculpture Garden in Washington and Albright-Knox Art Gallery	Washington DC and Buffalo	
1986–1987	Joan Miró: A Retrospective	Kunsthaus Zurich; Kunsthalle Düsseldorf and Solomon R. Guggenheim Museum	Düsseldorf, Zurich and N.York	
1987–1988	Five Centuries of Spanish Art: The Century of Picasso	Musée d'Art Moderne de la Ville de Paris and Museo Reina Sofia,	Paris and Madrid	
1990	Joan Miró: Estudi retrospectiu de l'obra de pintura	Fondation Maeght	Saint-Paul-de-Vence	
1993	Joan Miró: 1893–1993	Fundació Joan Miró & MoMA	Barcelona and New York City	
1998–1999	Joan Miró	Moderna Museet and Louisiana Museum of Modern Art	Stockholm & Humlebaek	
2001	Paris-Barcelona	Grand Palais i Museu Picasso	Paris i Barcelona	
2002	Joan Miró. Snail, woman, flower, Star	Stiftung Museum Kunst Palast	Düsseldorf	
2004	Joan Miró 1917–1934: La Naissance du Monde	Centre Georges Pompidou	Paris	
2006–2007	Barcelona and Modernity: Gaudí to Dalí	Cleveland Museum of Art and Metropolitan Museum of New York	Cleveland and New York	
2011	Joan Miró. The Ladder of escape	Tate and Fundació Joan Miró	London and Barcelona	
