= La Masia =

FC Barcelona's youth academy

- La Masia - Oriol Tort Education Center
- La Masia - Centre de Formació Oriol Tort
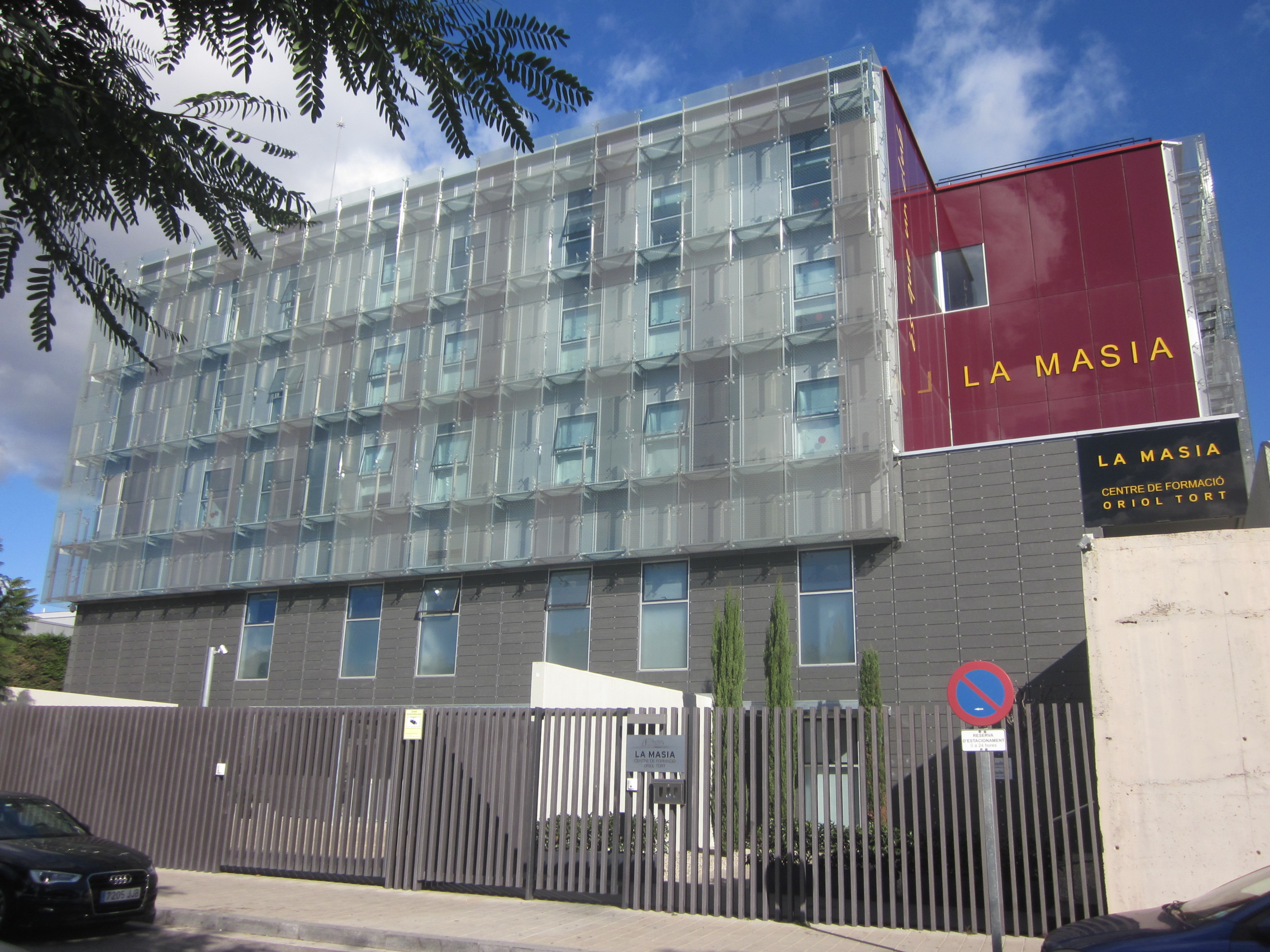
- La Masia athletes' residence, Barcelona

- Location within Spain
- Established: 1978; 48 years ago
- Location: Barcelona, Spain
- Coordinates: 41.3758°N 2.0502°E
- Owner: FC Barcelona

La Masia (Catalan pronunciation: [lə məˈzi.ə]; English: "The Farmhouse") is the youth academy of FC Barcelona. It includes more than 300 young players and has been an instrumental factor in Barcelona's European success, producing several world class players and is considered the best youth system in world football.

In 2010, La Masia became the first youth academy to have trained all three finalists for the Ballon d'Or in a single year: Lionel Messi, Andrés Iniesta and Xavi.

In addition to its most prominent role as a youth academy for football, La Masia also houses and trains young players in other sports which operate clubs under the FC Barcelona umbrella, including basketball, handball and roller hockey.

Originally based at Can Planes, a traditional farmhouse near the Camp Nou in the Les Corts district of Barcelona, the academy now operates from more modern facilities at the Ciutat Esportiva Joan Gamper, while retaining La Masia ("The Farmhouse") as its official name.

== History ==
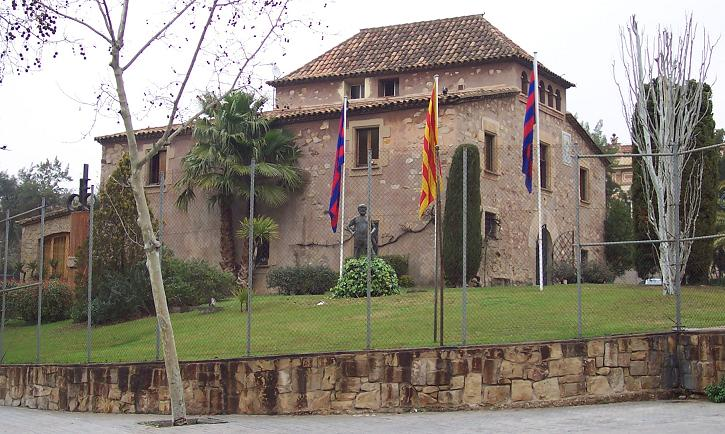
Can Planes, former home of La Masia, 1979–2011

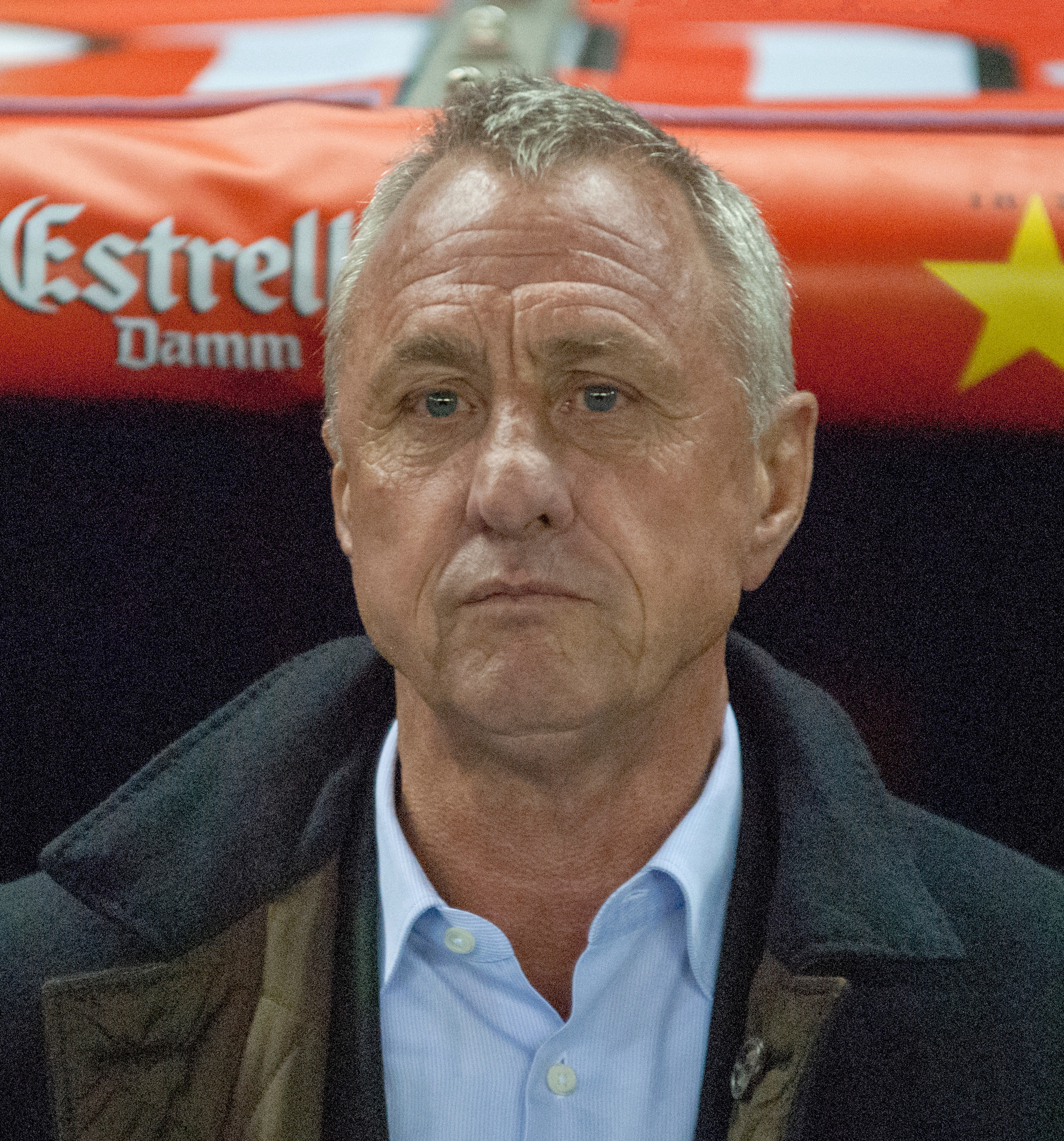
Johan Cruyff in 2013

The idea for the youth academy was proposed to Josep Lluís Núñez by Jaume Amat Murtra and Oriol Tort was put in charge of the facility.

Once Camp Nou was inaugurated in 1957, the nearby masia (Catalan farmhouse building) of Can Planes was remodelled and extended for use as the club's social headquarters. With the gradual expansion of the club, Can Planes became too small for the club's headquarters, and on 20 October 1979, the building was converted into a dormitory for young academy players from outside Barcelona.

In 2011, it was announced that Barcelona would be moving all its football training activities to the Ciutat Esportiva Joan Gamper, where the new Oriol Tort Education Center building would house La Masia's young members.

La Masia received more publicity after Barcelona B's success with homegrown players; Rory Smith reported in The Daily Telegraph that La Masia "has replaced the fabled Ajax Academy as football's foremost production line". The recent fame and success of La Masia as a talent school was ascribed by Ian Hawkey of The Times to the class of 1987, which featured prominent members such as Cesc Fàbregas, Lionel Messi, Gerard Piqué and Pedro. In 2000, Louis van Gaal, coach of Barcelona's first team, was widely ridiculed by the city sports media for his dream to win the Champions League with 11 home-grown players. The first team won the trophy in 2009 with eight home-grown players.

From 1979 to 2009, 440 youngsters have left their homes and families to stay at the academy. About half of them were from Catalonia, and the rest came from other regions of the Kingdom of Spain and beyond, including 15 from Cameroon, 7 from Brazil, 5 from Senegal and 3 from Argentina. Of those 440, 40 made it into Barcelona's first team.

== Organization ==
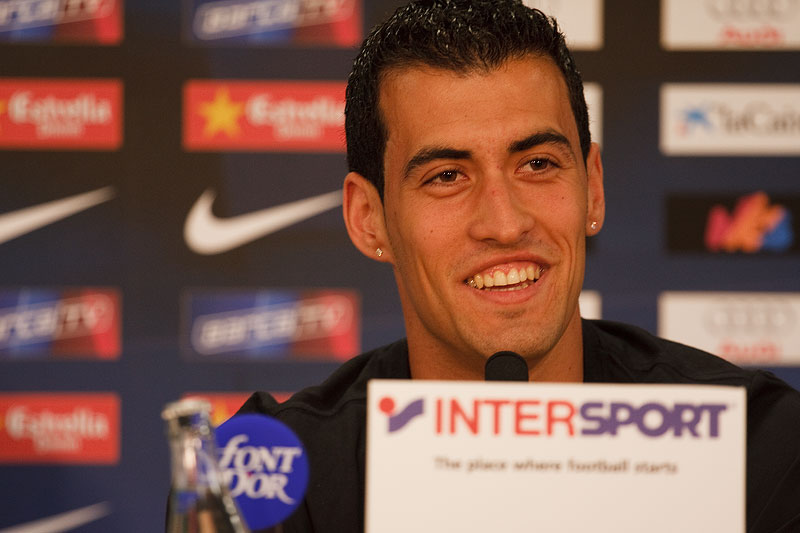
Sergio Busquets, a graduate of La Masia, was part of the Barcelona first team from 2008 until 2023.

La Masia is one of the most expensive academies in Europe to run, operating at a cost to the club of €15 million a year as of 2013. The main cost is the dormitory, La Masia itself. The minimum age requirement is six years old; each year, more than 1,000 boys from the ages of six to eight try out for admission. The best 200 are selected. The club also actively seeks for prospective students; it employs a system in which 15 scouts are deployed in Catalonia, 15 in the rest of Spain and 10 scattered throughout the world. To alleviate the expenses of this scouting, the club has an agreement with 15 local clubs for them to train players who are not ready for entry into the youth academy. In return, FC Barcelona gives money, coaching and technical advice to these clubs for their services. While expanding its operations abroad, the club established five schools in Mexico and one in Egypt; successful applicants to these schools become full-time students, receiving academic education and football training.

When Pep Guardiola re-organised the reserve side, he set up a three-staged program to formalise the advancement from Juvenil to Barcelona B and finally to the first team. The first stage of a youth player's career involves a rotation scheme with Barcelona B. The second stage involves making the player aware of his importance to the team and the expectation that the player will improve cohesion and performance within the reserve side. In the last stage, he is designated a "key" player of the B team and might be called to the first team. One of the players in the third phase is made captain, regardless of the experience of older players.

The teams at Barcelona play from August to May; mild weather at La Masia allows players to train outdoors throughout the year. The youth teams train after school; Barcelona B plays as a professional team, training in the morning and evening. All of the trainers at FC Barcelona are former professional footballers.

Barcelona B, the club's main youth team, and the 12 other youth teams contained 24 coaches and more than 300 players. There are 56 other employees, including doctors, psychologists, nutritionists, cooks and physiologists. In the 2009–10 season, the B team qualified for the Segunda División again. Barcelona B play in a 4–3–3 formation, which is the same formation employed by the first team.

== Philosophy ==
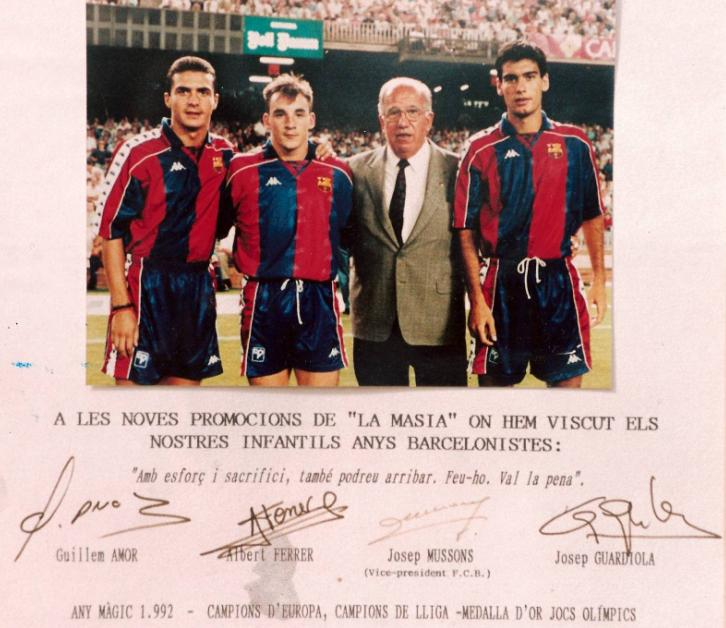
Guillermo Amor, Albert Ferrer, Josep Mussons (Barça Vice-president) and Pep Guardiola. This photo was displayed for many years at the entrance of La Masia dining room. Their signature, in Catalan language, encourages future young Barça players by saying "With effort and sacrifice, you can also make it. Just do it, it is worth it!".

"The player who has passed through La Masia has something different to the rest, it's a plus that only comes from having competed in a Barcelona shirt from the time you were a child."

— Former Barcelona coach Pep Guardiola

Former technical director Pep Segura attributes the club's success to its "philosophy of play": "It is about creating one philosophy, one mentality, from the bottom of the club to the top". The philosophy consists of the application of total football mixed with traditional Spanish one-touch play (tiki-taka). The total football approach was derived from the Netherlands football team through Cruyff. The total football approach requires the players to move in a fluid formation, where players can interchange positions quickly. In the youth academy, there is a large focus on technical ability, which is seen as a pre-requisite for inter-changes. An often-quoted reason for Barcelona's success is the continuity and commitment with which Barcelona follow the current philosophy of pass and move. Guardiola was the prototype of the pivotal midfielder; famous midfielders Xavi and Iniesta are its custodians.

== Impact ==
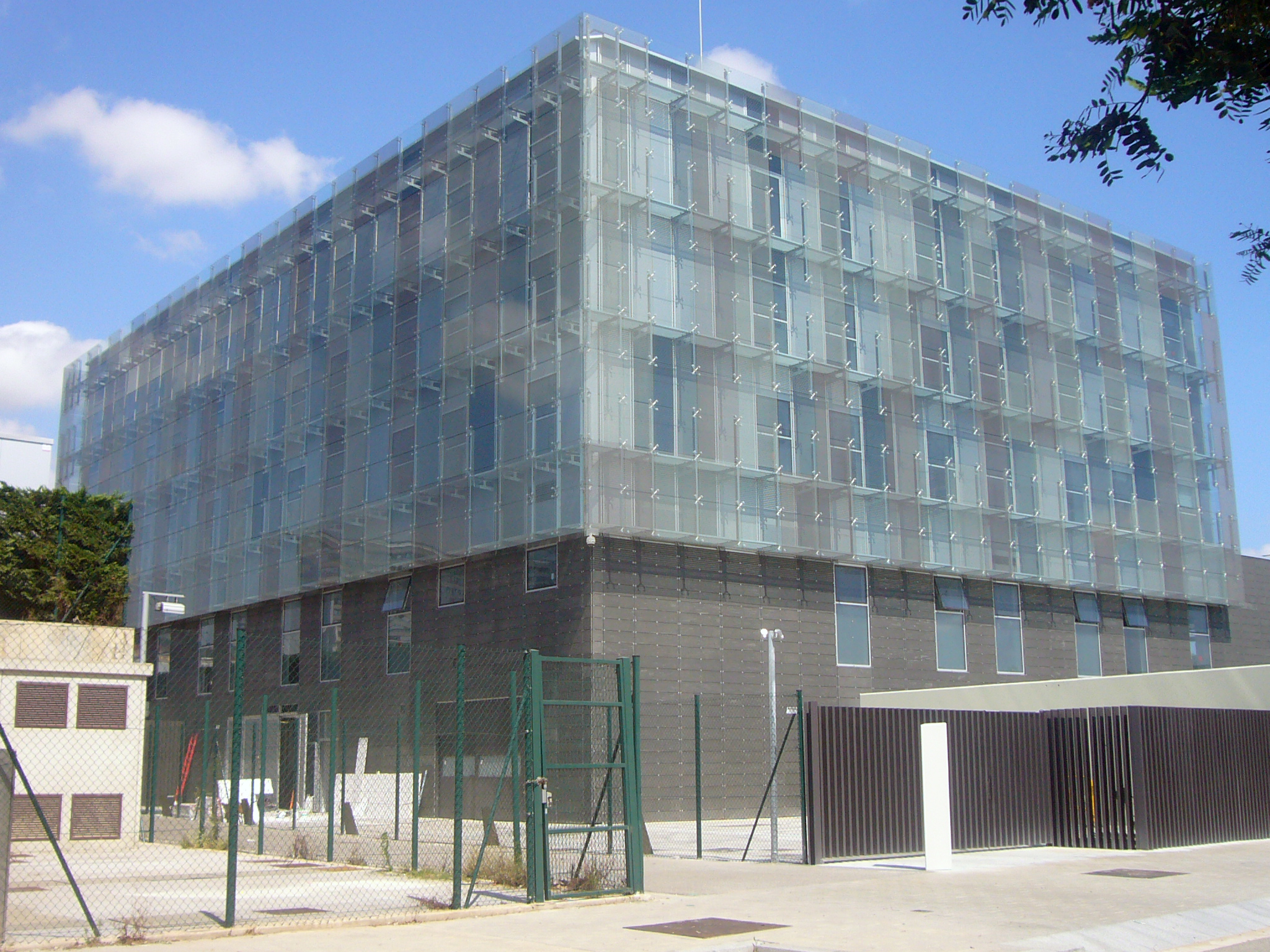
The new Masia residence, opened in 2011 at the Ciutat Esportiva Joan Gamper.

In 2009, Messi became the first player from La Masia to be awarded with the Ballon d'Or prize for the best footballer in Europe, and the FIFA World Player award, for the best footballer in the world. In the next year, Messi would win the Ballon d'Or again, but La Masia became the first youth academy to have trained all three finalists for in a single year: Messi, Andrés Iniesta and Xavi.

Spain won the 2010 FIFA World Cup with seven players from Barcelona in a World Cup final. Joachim Löw, coach of Germany, said after his side's defeat by Spain that the opposition had a distinct Barcelona style: "You can see it in every pass, how Spain plays is how Barcelona plays. They can hardly be beaten. They are extremely confident and very calm in the way they circulate the ball."

On 25 November 2012, for the first time, Barcelona fielded all eleven players that have come up through La Masia in a La Liga match. After Dani Alves was substituted by Martín Montoya due to an injury in the 13th minute, Barça played the next 60 minutes with Víctor Valdés, Montoya, Carles Puyol, Gerard Piqué, Jordi Alba, Sergio Busquets, Xavi, Iniesta, Cesc Fàbregas, Pedro, and Messi.

In the years immediately following this achievement, with those players aging and Barcelona seeking to maintain their position as one of the world's top clubs, they moved towards a more conventional recruitment strategy, signing some of the most talented players from around the globe for large transfer fees, such as Neymar, Luis Suárez and Philippe Coutinho, plus younger players (most with origins in Brazil and France) expected to improve further with the club; however, this approach (combined with something of a 'stockpiling' of players due to a transfer ban for breaching regulations regarding the signing of non-EU youth players) meant there was less opportunity for local academy graduates to appear with the first team, and a perception that the quality of players produced by Barcelona was not quite as high as the previous generation. Nevertheless, the team continued to win trophies and some further canterans did make a breakthrough into the squad, including Rafinha, Carles Aleñá and Sergi Roberto, the latter having to retrain as a right back due to the abundance of talent in his original midfield position. The return of Joan Laporta as president and Xavi as head coach marked the return of the preference for La Masia players, such as Gavi, Ansu Fati, Lamine Yamal, Alejandro Balde, Pau Cubarsí, Fermín López, Marc Casadó and the signing of previous La Masia graduates, such as Eric García, Oriol Romeu and Dani Olmo.

La Masia has opened a Residence Academy in Arizona that leverage the same methods that La Masia does in Catalonia. Top players from the AZ academy are invited to Catalonia annually to visit La Masia.

== Notable alumni ==
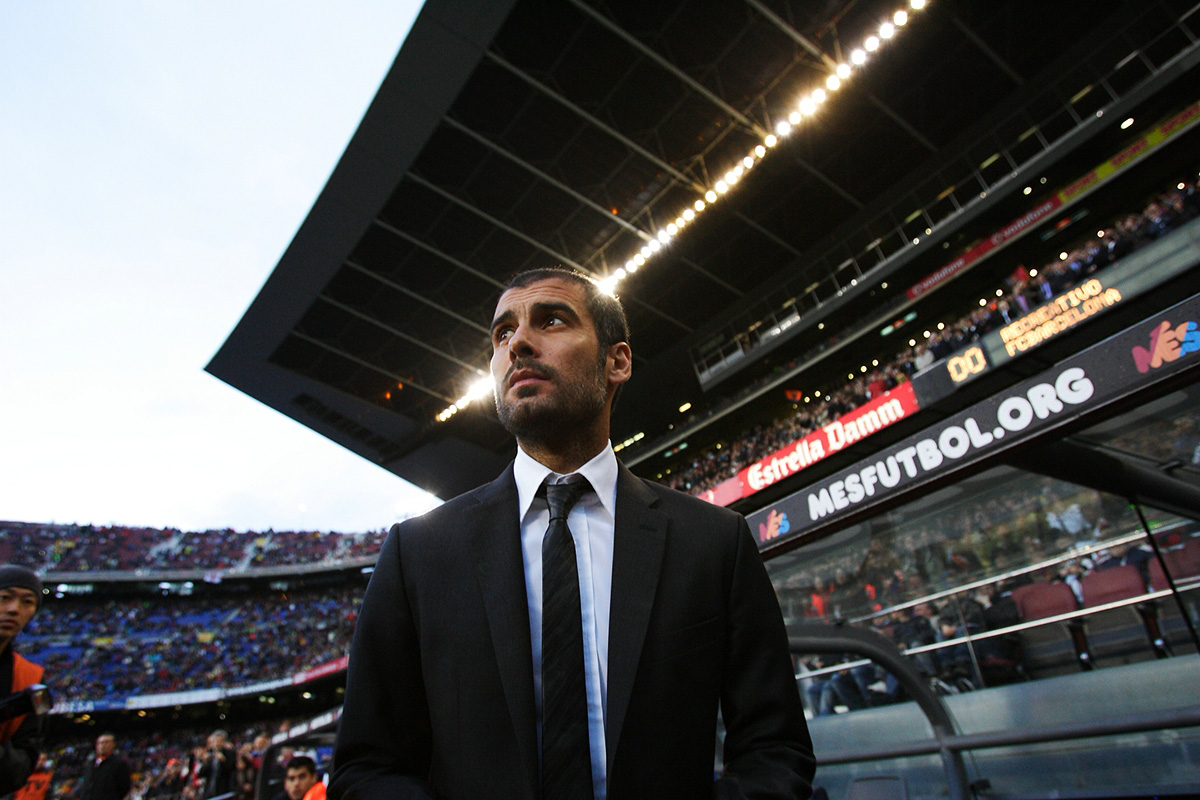
Pep Guardiola's reign at Barcelona (2008–2012) marked one of the most successful eras in the history of the club and its youth academy.

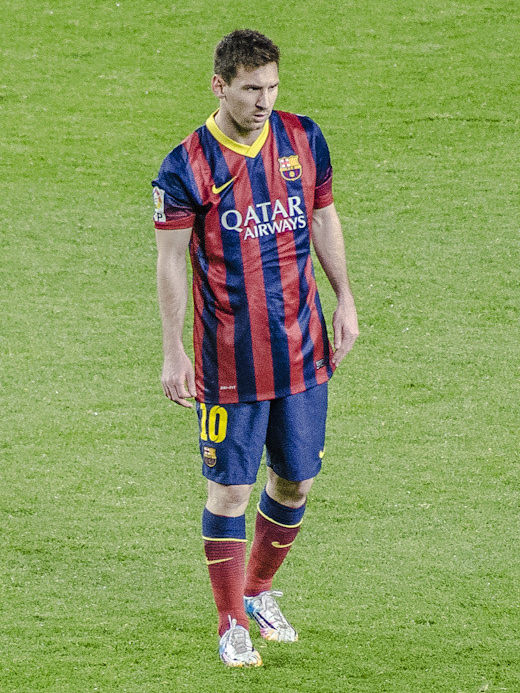
Lionel Messi, the most notable alumnus of La Masia

Many players from Barcelona's youth system go on to have careers in football, whether at Barcelona or at other clubs. The following is a list of players who have played for the academy.

**Bold**	Denotes players still with the club

Player	Nationality	Position	Barcelona career	League appearances	League goals
Lionel Messi	Argentina	Forward	2004–2021	520	474
Xavi	Spain	Midfielder	1998–2015	505	58
Sergio Busquets	Spain	Midfielder	2008–2023	481	11
Andrés Iniesta	Spain	Midfielder	2002–2018	442	35
Carles Puyol	Spain	Defender	1999–2014	392	12
Gerard Piqué	Spain	Defender	2008–2022	397	29
Víctor Valdés	Spain	Goalkeeper	2002–2014	387	0
Jordi Alba	Spain	Defender	2012–2023	313	17
Guillermo Amor	Spain	Midfielder	1988–1998	311	47
Sergi Barjuán	Spain	Defender	1993–2002	267	6
Pep Guardiola	Spain	Midfielder	1990–2001	263	6
Francisco Carrasco	Spain	Forward	1978–1989	262	49
Sergi Roberto	Spain	Midfielder	2010–2024	245	12
Tente Sánchez	Spain	Midfielder	1976–1986	236	16
Pedro	Spain	Forward	2007–2015	204	58
Albert Ferrer	Spain	Defender	1990–1998	204	1
Antonio Olmo	Spain	Defender	1976–1984	188	4
Gabri García	Spain	Midfielder	1999–2006	129	7
Oleguer Presas	Spain	Defender	2001–2008	127	1
**Gavi**	Spain	Midfielder	2021–	119	6
**Alejandro Balde**	Spain	Defender	2021–	116	1
**Eric García**	Spain	Defender	2021–	115	4
Ramón Calderé	Spain	Midfielder	1984–1988	110	15
Bojan	Spain	Forward	2007–2011	104	26
Josep Moratalla	Spain	Defender	1982–1988	104	1
**Lamine Yamal**	Spain	Forward	2023–	101	30
Manolo	Spain	Defender	1979–1988	97	0
Cesc Fàbregas	Spain	Midfielder	2011–2014	96	28
Thiago Motta	Brazil	Midfielder	2001–2007	96	6
Gerard López	Spain	Midfielder	2000–2005	91	5
Iván de la Peña	Spain	Midfielder	1995–1998 2000–2001	90	11
**Fermín López**	Spain	Midfielder	2023–	89	20
Ansu Fati	Spain	Forward	2019–2026	86	22
**Pau Cubarsí**	Spain	Defender	2023–	85	1
Carles Busquets	Spain	Goalkeeper	1990–1999	79	0
Roger García	Spain	Midfielder	1995–1999	78	7
Juan José Estella	Spain	Midfielder	1979–1983	74	7
Albert Celades	Spain	Midfielder	1995–1999	72	4
Óscar García	Spain	Midfielder	1993–1999	69	21
Thiago	Spain	Midfielder	2009–2013	68	7
Juan Carlos Rojo	Spain	Forward	1983–1987	63	4
Paco Clos	Spain	Forward	1982–1988	62	9
Cristian Tello	Spain	Forward	2011–2014	59	11
Marc Bartra	Spain	Defender	2010–2016	59	5
**Dani Olmo**	Spain	Midfielder	2024–	58	17
Rafinha	Brazil	Midfielder	2011–2020	56	8
Martín Montoya	Spain	Defender	2011–2015	45	1
Luis Milla	Spain	Midfielder	1984–1990	54	2
**Marc Casadó**	Spain	Midfielder	2022–	49	1
Óscar Mingueza	Spain	Defender	2020–2022	46	2
Ángel Pedraza	Spain	Midfielder	1985–1988	45	4
Riqui Puig	Spain	Midfielder	2018–2022	42	2
Jordi Cruyff	Netherlands	Forward	1994–1996	41	11
