= Can Planes =

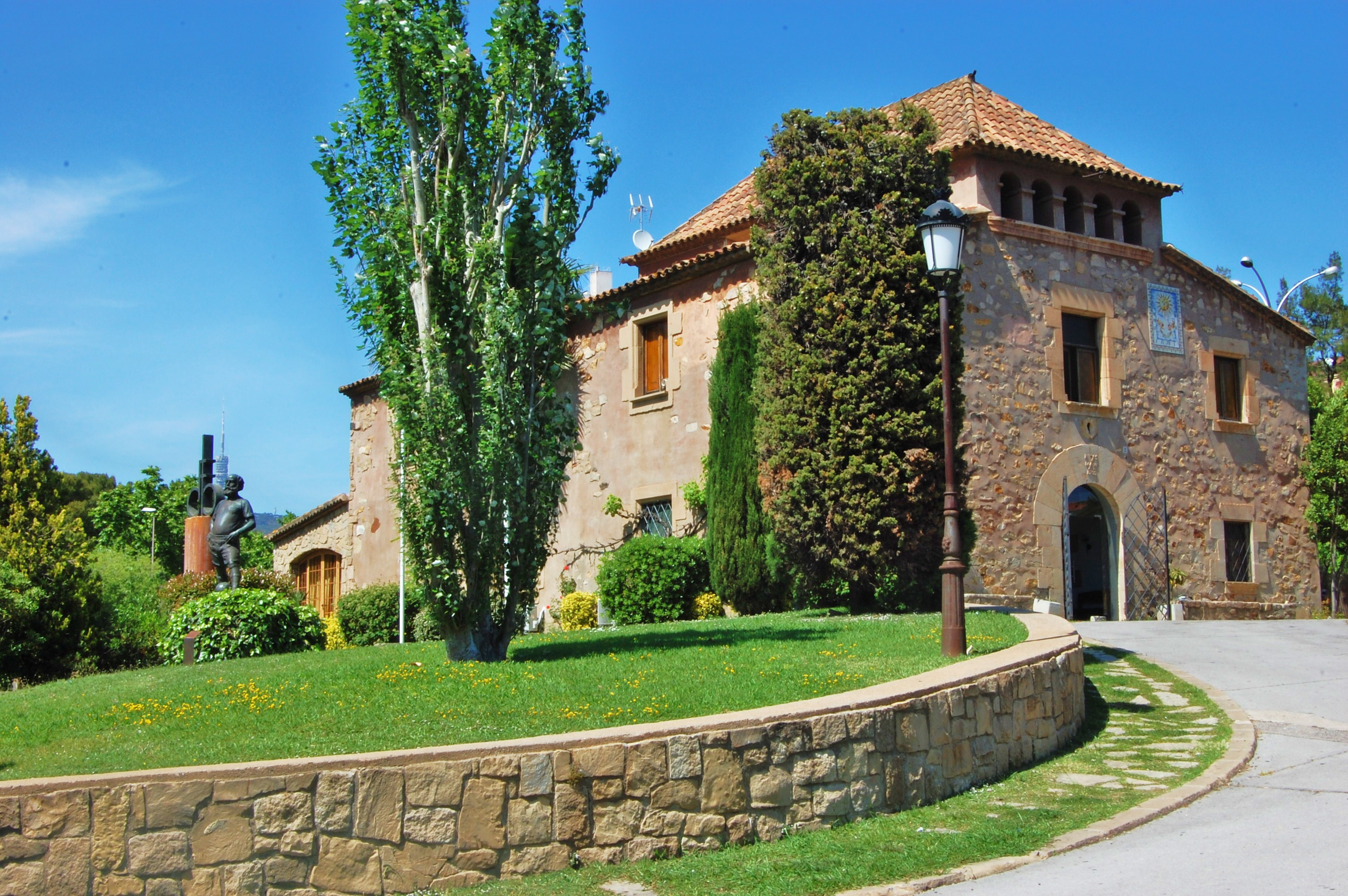
- Main façade of Can Planes

- Location within Spain
- Alternative names: Can Freixes

General information
- Location: Barcelona, Spain
- Coordinates: 41.3831°N 2.1231°E
- Completed: 1702; 324 years ago
- Renovated: 1966; 60 years ago
- Owner: FC Barcelona

Can Planes (Catalan pronunciation: [kən ˈpla.nəs]) is a historic building in the Les Corts district of Barcelona, best known as the former home of La Masia, the youth academy of FC Barcelona.

Architecturally, Can Planes is a traditional Catalan farmhouse known as a masia – the nickname of the football academy was derived from the style of the building.

Can Planes has been a protected building designated as a Cultural Asset of Local Interest since 2000.

== History ==
Can Planes was an old Catalan farmhouse, built in 1702. In 1979, it was first used by the club to house its young footballers who originated from outside Barcelona.

Once Camp Nou was inaugurated in 1957, the building was remodelled and extended for use as the club's social headquarters. With the gradual expansion of the club, the building became too small for headquarters, and on 20 October 1979, Can Planes was converted into a dormitory for young players from outside Barcelona.

As of 2009, Can Planes was still being used to house about 10 of the academy's players, with the majority then housed in rooms of the adjacent stadium.

On 30 June 2011, Can Planes ceased housing the academy's players. In a ceremony, the doors were closed and a new building in the Ciutat Esportiva Joan Gamper took over the function of the residential centre for the players of La Masia.

In 2016, FC Barcelona was reported for illegal works carried out on the protected building, receiving a fine of €23,500 from the City Council of Barcelona and an order for the immediate cessation of any construction or renovation work at the site. A legal investigation is set to determine whether the works already carried out constitute a destruction of cultural heritage.

In 2025, with investigations still ongoing, planning permission was nevertheless granted for the transformation of Can Planes into a new social and event space for the club.
