= Rubió =

- Municipality
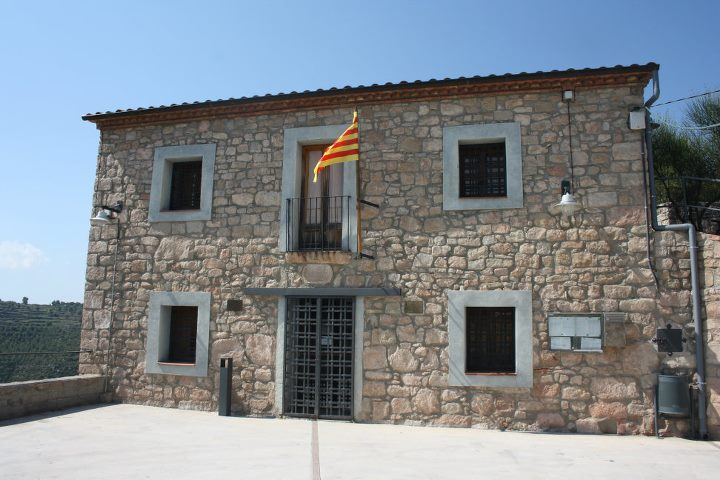
- Rubió town hall

- Flag Coat of arms

- Location in Catalonia Rubió (Spain)
- Coordinates: 41°38′47″N 1°34′17″E
- Country: Spain
- Community: Catalonia
- Province: Barcelona
- Comarca: Anoia

Government
  - Mayor: Francesc Miquel Archela Gil (2015) (CiU)

Area
  - Total: 48.0 km^{2} (18.5 sq mi)
- Elevation: 634.4 m (2,081 ft)

Population (2025-01-01)
  - Total: 225
  - Density: 4.69/km^{2} (12.1/sq mi)
- Postal code: 08719
- Website: rubio.cat

Rubió (Catalan pronunciation: [ruβiˈo]) is a rural municipality in the comarca of Anoia in Catalonia, Spain. Its administrative centre is the village of Rubió, and other villages include Maçana and El Pla de Rubió. As of 2014, the municipality had 228 inhabitants. At 48 square kilometres (19 sq mi) it is one of the largest municipalities of the Alta Segarra, and at one time was the most sparsely populated.

== Overview ==
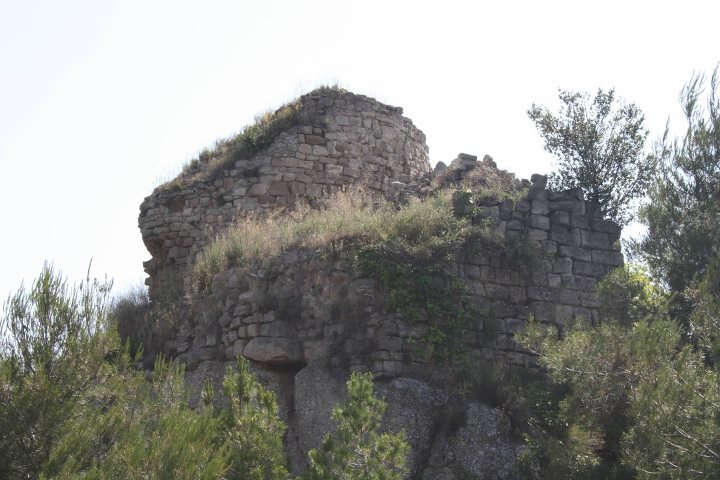
Ruins of the Castell de Rubió

In 1840, the old municipality of Maçana annexed Rubió to increase its population; the municipal limits remain unchanged from then on. Two theories exist about the origin of the toponym Rubió. One holds that it derives from rubeus (coppery), possibly alluding to the red colour of the land and the rocks of the mountain on which was built the Castell de Rubió. According to the second, Rubió derives from the Latin rufus (blond) through the name Rubione, a local landowner in the Roman Empire.

=== Coat of arms ===
The coat of arms, granted on 12 February 1996, has on the inferior part a gules castle with a fleur-de-lis in the centre. At the top is a mural crown of the village. The castle refers to the ruined Castell de Rubió.

=== Churches ===
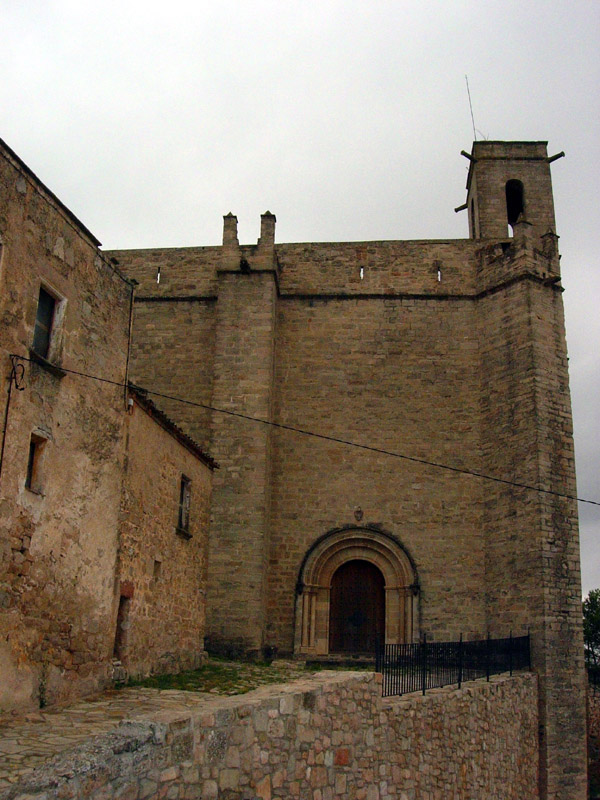
Church of Santa Maria de Rubió

Rubió, part of the diocese of Vic, has five churches:Informative label of the Deputation of Barcelona to the El Pla de Rubió (photo)

- Santa Anna Chapel in Maçana, built in the 15th century
- Santa Maria de Rubió Church in Rubió, built in 1275
- Sant Martí de Maçana Church in Maçana, built in the 10th century
- Sant Pere d'Ardesa Church in Rubió, built in the 11th century
- Sant Macari Church in El Pla de Rubió, built in 1198

== Geography ==
Rubió is northeast of the comarca of Anoia, near the geographic centre of Catalonia. The municipality adjoins the municipalities of Aguilar de Segarra (Bages), Castellfollit del Boix (Bages), Òdena, Jorba, Copons and Els Prats de Rei. It is at the centre of the Serra de Rubió, whose highest peak is the 837-metre (2,746 ft) Còpia de Palomes.

North of the Serra de Rubió is the Maçana River, a tributary of the Llobregat. The Rubió river, also a tributary of the Llobregat, rises south of the mountains.

=== Wildlife ===
Seventy percent of the municipality is forested, primarily by the Pinus halepensis, the Pinus nigra and the Scots Pine (Pinus sylvestris). Fauna includes the boar (Sus scrofa), the European rabbit (Oryctolagus cuniculus) and deer (Cervus elaphus and Capreolus capreolus). Falcons are also numerous.

=== Climate ===
Rubió has a Mediterranean continental climate, with hot summers (+35 °C) and cold winters (-10 °C). Snow, frost and fog are common in winter. Summer droughts may last for two months. Spring and fall are somewhat rainy, and the annual average precipitation is 680 millimetres (27 in).

Month	Jan	Feb	Mar	Apr	May	Jun	Jul	Aug	Sep	Oct	Nov	Dec	year
Average temperature (°C)	3,8	3,2	4,6	11,4	17,1	22,6	23,6	25,1	19,4	15,2	9,6	6.0	13,4
Rainfall (mm)	36	38	57	58	78	65	36	60	76	70	56	50	680

=== Wind farm ===
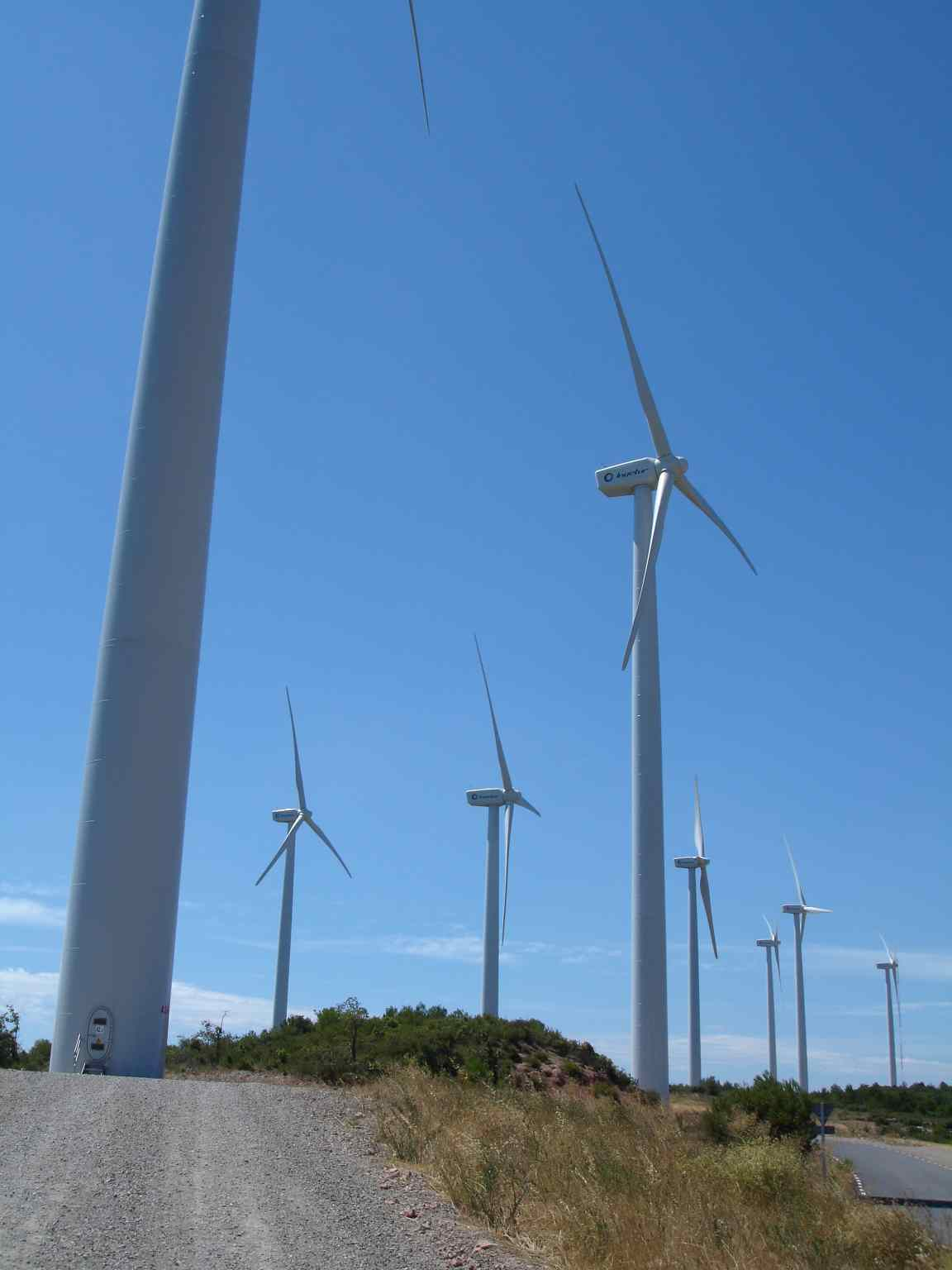
Rubió wind farm

The Rubió wind farm, Catalonia's largest, consists of 50 windmills which can produce energy for 30,000 homes. The wind farm, installed in fall 2004 and operational in spring 2005. serves Rubió (Anoia) and part of Castellfollit del Boix (Bages) and Òdena (Anoia).

== History ==
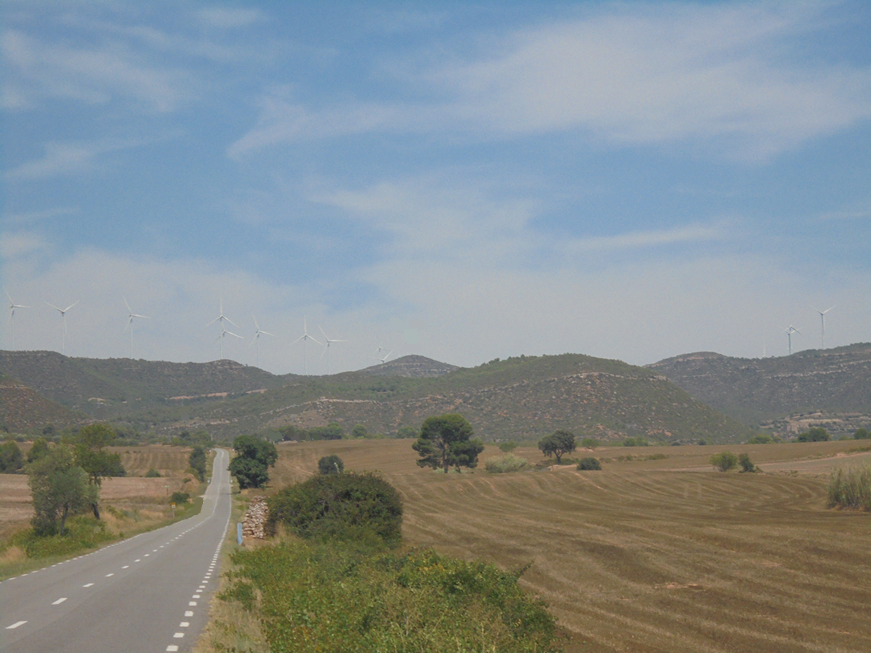
Serra de Rubió

Human habitation has been found in the region since the Copper Age. A megalithic burial site and a Roman village have been found. During the 14th century the village was affected by plague and poor harvests, and many people moved to the cities and other villages. At the beginning of the 19th century, during the Peninsular War, the Serra de Rubió was a strategic point for the Igualadan resistance.

== Demographics ==
In 2014, Rubió had 220 inhabitants and was one of the most sparsely populated municipalities in Anoia. Most residents are seasonal and engage in agriculture.

== Politics and government ==
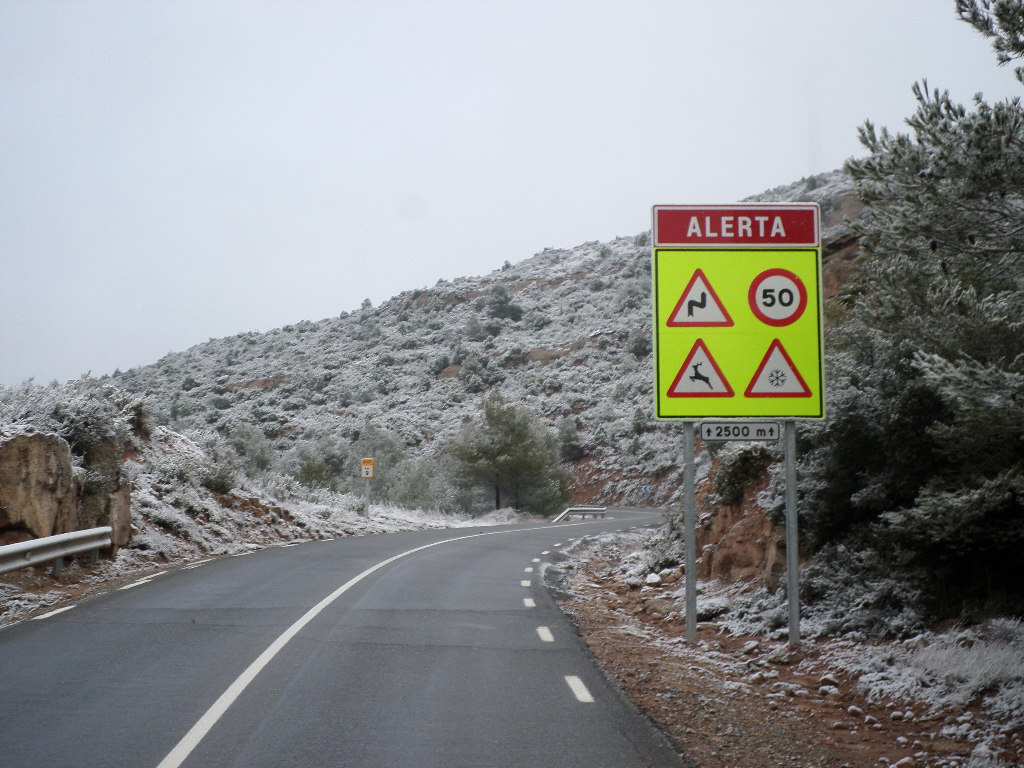
Maioles mountain pass (road BV-1031)

Rubió is governed by the Convergència i Unió (CiU). The mayor is Francesc Miquel Archela Gil, and the city council has four other members.

== Transport ==
Rubió is accessible by the C-1412, BV-1031 and BV-1037 roads and the A-2 motorway. Public transport does not reach the town, and the nearest bus station is in Jorba.
