= Jujol Centre – Can Negre =

Coordinates: 41.36743°N 2.05784°E

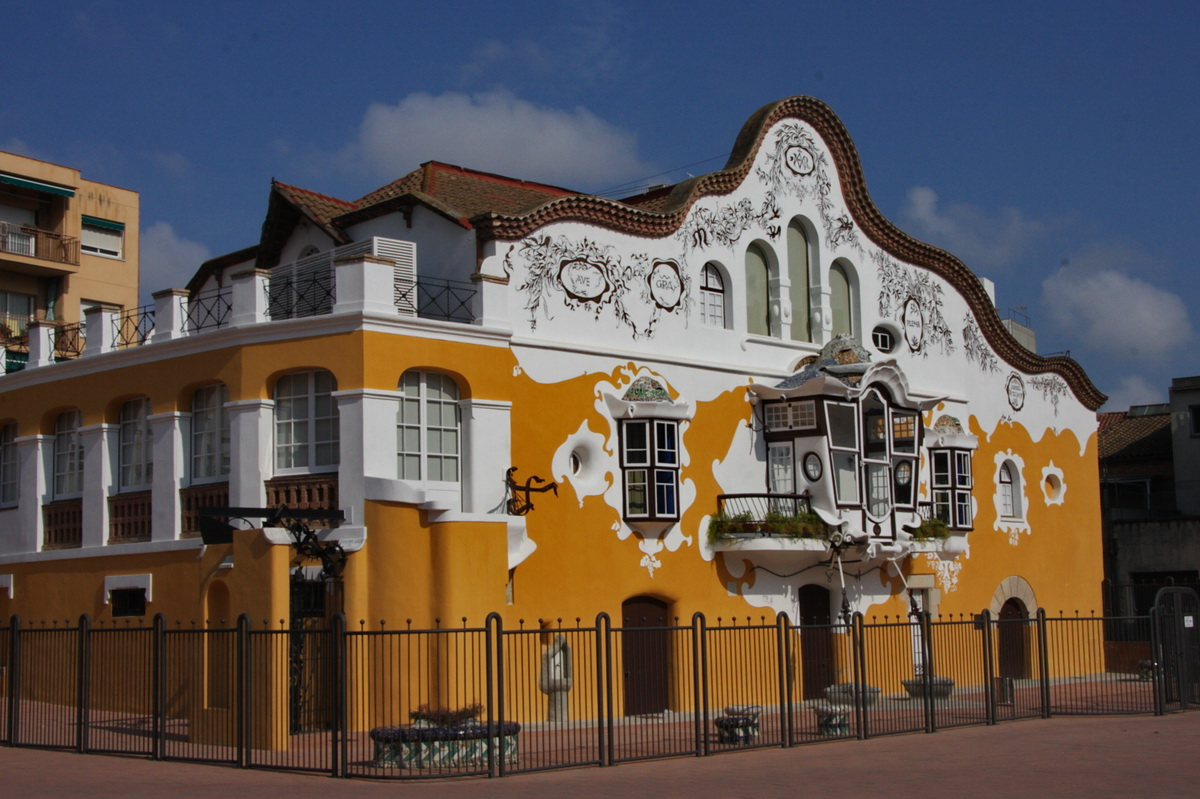
Can Negre

Can Negre is a 17th-century masia (Catalan farmhouse) located in Sant Joan Despí, which was renovated by Art Nouveau architect Josep Maria Jujol between 1915 and 1930.

== History ==
At the beginning of the 20th century, the house was owned by lawyer and rural landowner Pere Negre i Jover (1867-1939), who commissioned Josep Maria Jujol with renovation work. The first Can Negre renovation project had to integrate a building originally for rural purposes into the newly urbanized surroundings of Sant Joan Despí, and convert a country house into one for an aristocrat. The work was carried out in stages, adapted to the owner's budget. The first phase involved renovation (1915–1917), followed by an extension (1917–1921) and then a decorative phase (1920–1926).

In 1966 the house became the property of Sant Joan Despí Town Council, a donation from the heirs of the Negre family. In 1982, architects Antoni Navarro, Gabriel Robert and Xavier Güell drew up the first refurbishment projects. The house was completely refurbished between 1984 and 1990, with a project directed by architect Francesc Xavier Asarta. It currently belongs to the town council, which holds many cultural activities there, as well as housing the Jujol Centre – Can Negre, part of the Barcelona Provincial Council Local Museum Network.

== The building ==
The main façade is one of the principal elements, and is crowned by undulating lines in a style typical of Baroque façades. The original façade openings were maintained, but were given a new style, such as designing the main bay window in the surprising shape of a carriage. A border edges the curving profile of the upper level, with five medallions that form the inscription: Ave gratia plena dominus tecum. The décor is a combination of sgraffiti, trencadís (mosaics made with pieces of broken tile), wood, iron and gypsum. Inside the building, perhaps the most notable element is the spiral staircase that leading upstairs, topped with an octagonal dome, and a small Baroque-style chapel with an elliptical floor plan.

== See also ==
- Josep Maria Jujol
