= Còpia de Palomes =

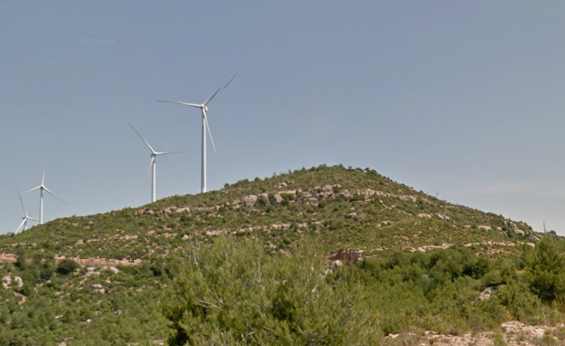
- The mountain in June 2013

Highest point
- Elevation: 837 m (2,746 ft)
- Prominence: 100 m (330 ft)
- Coordinates: 41°39′35″N 1°36′10″E

Geography
- Location within Pyrenees
- Location: Anoia, Catalonia, Spain
- Parent range: Serra de Rubió

The Còpia de Palomes is a mountain located in Catalonia, Spain. It has an elevation of 837-metre-high (2,746 ft). It is situated between the municipalities of Rubió and Òdena, in the comarca of the Anoia, province of Barcelona. It is the highest mountain in the Serra de Rubió.
