= Masia =

Type of building

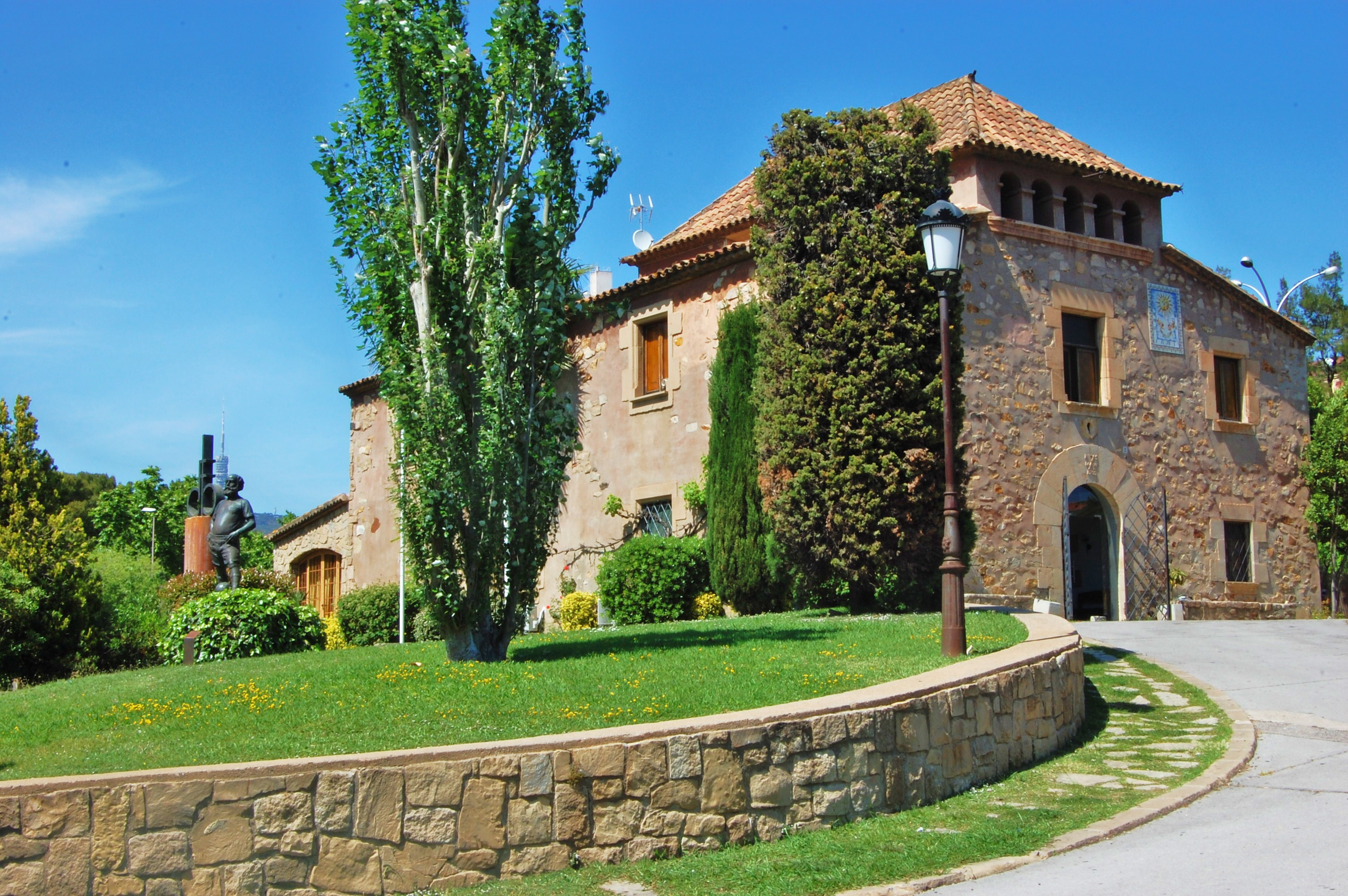
La Masia de Can Planes in Les Corts, Barcelona

A masia in Catalan (or Spanish: masía and Aragonese: pardina) is a type of rural construction common to currently or formerly Catalan-speaking regions, including Catalonia, Valencia, Aragon, Sardinia, Languedoc and Provence. The estate in which the masia is located is called a mas. They are often large but isolated structures, nearly always associated with a family farming or livestock operation.

Through the ages, the materials used to construct masias varied, often determined by their location. In mountainous areas, rough stone was often used, except for doorways, windows and arches, where stone was worked. During the Middle Ages, mud was used as mortar, though later on it was replaced by quicklime or cement. In places where stone was hard to come by, adobe was more common as a construction material.

For the most part, masias are oriented to the south. Constructions older than 16th century have an arched main entrance while those built after the 18th century usually have lintel entrances. Masies were typically constructed with wooden beams placed perpendicular to the facade and covered by tiles. In the Pyrenees and other mountainous areas, the roofing would often be made of slate.

They tended to be at least two-story buildings, with the ground floor reserved for farming tasks and even housing livestock, with the upper floor reserved for the family's living quarters. If there was a floor above that, it would often be used as a granary, or occasionally to house pigeons.

Occasionally, masias include an annexed private chapel.

In modern times, many masias have been converted into residential villas, restaurants, bed and breakfasts, or centres for rural tourism. Some house museums (i.e. Vil·la Joana, Jujol Centre - Can Negre) or have been restored and adapted for cultural uses.

Some early works of the Spanish painter Joan Miró depict his family's own masia as well as Catalan peasants.

== FC Barcelona ==
The FC Barcelona youth academy is called La Masia, so named because it was formerly located in an authentic 18th-century masia called the 'Masia de Can Planes'. The masia is located adjacent to the Camp Nou in the Les Corts district of Barcelona, and was used to house young footballers from 1979 to 2011.

== Images ==
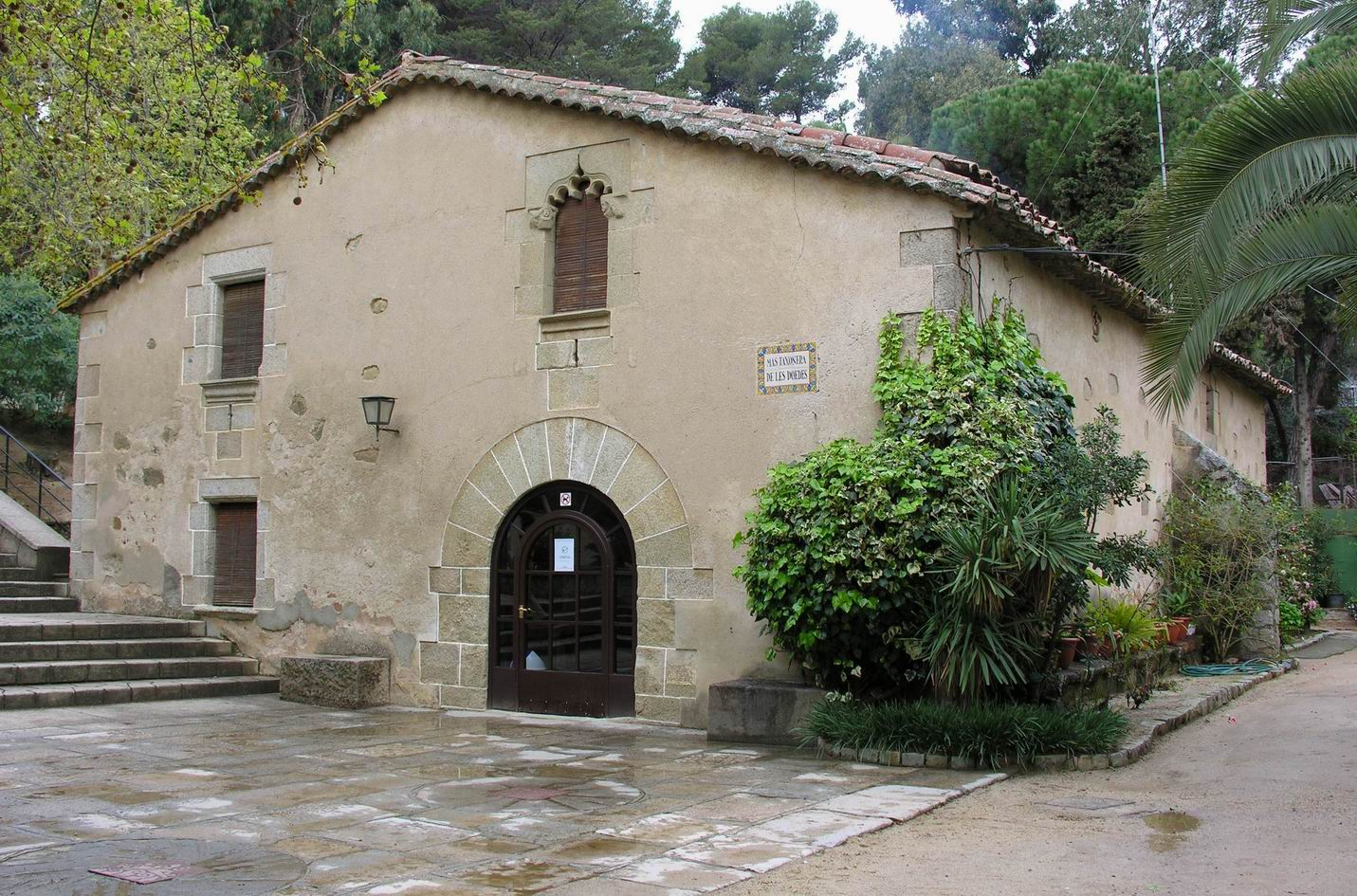
The Masia Can Taxonera in Arenys de Mar

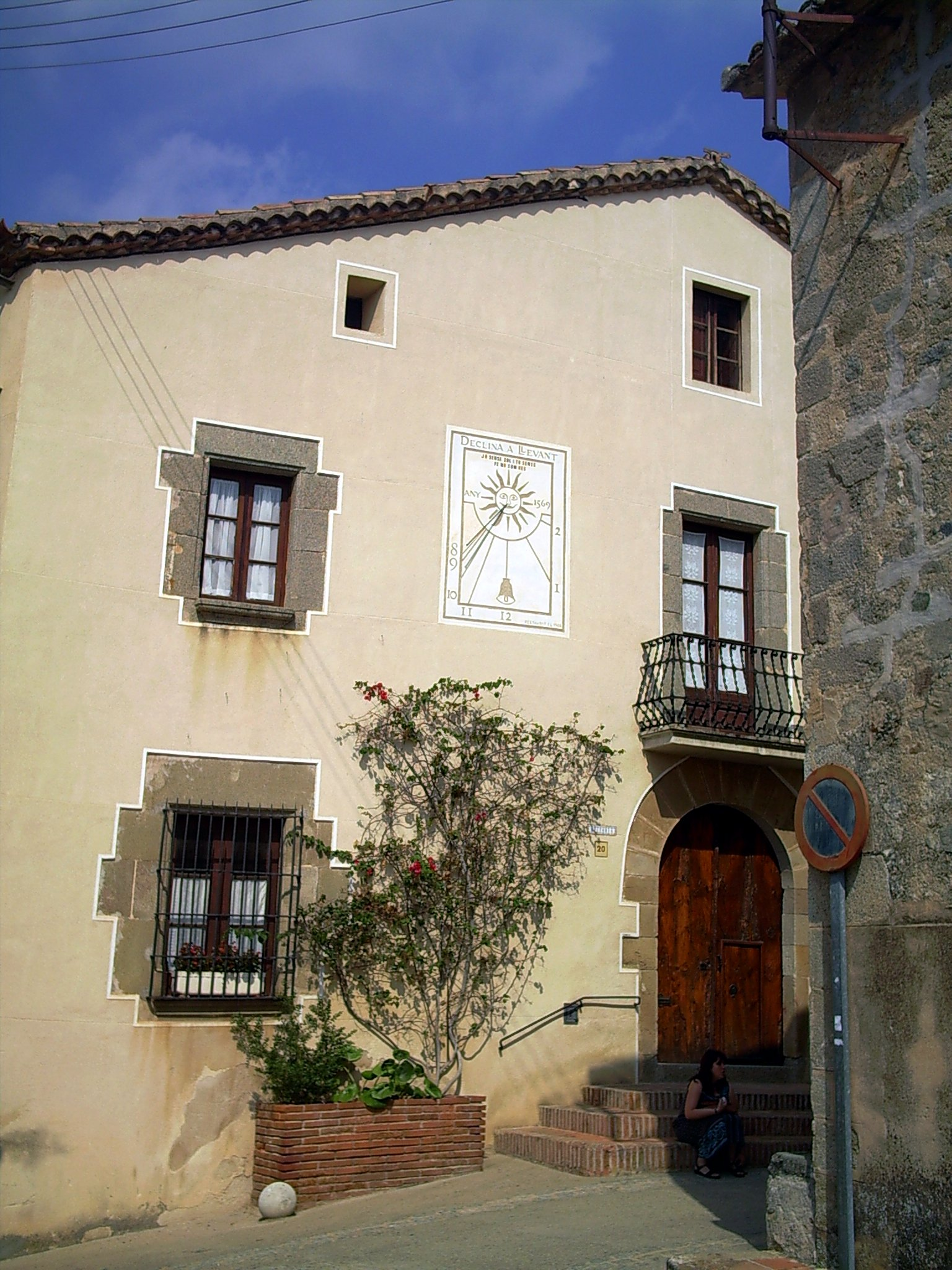
The Rectory of Premià de Dalt, from around the 17th Century.

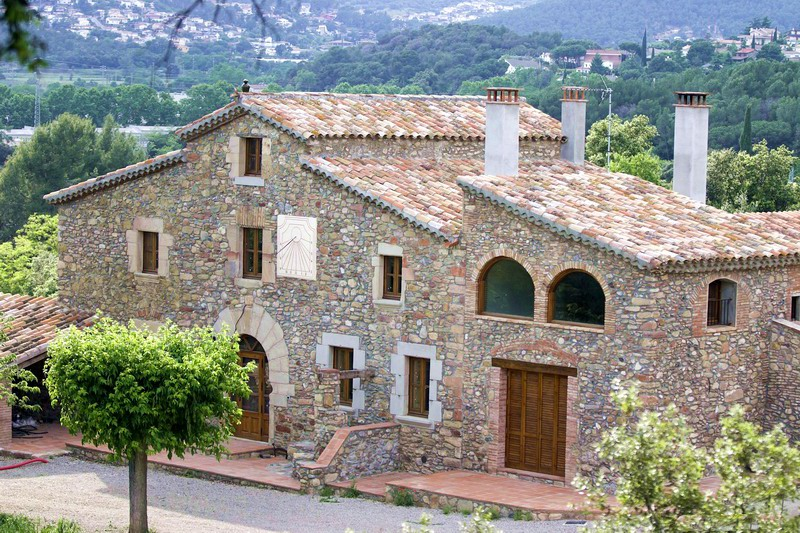
The Mas Fabregas del Bosc in l'Ametlla del Vallès

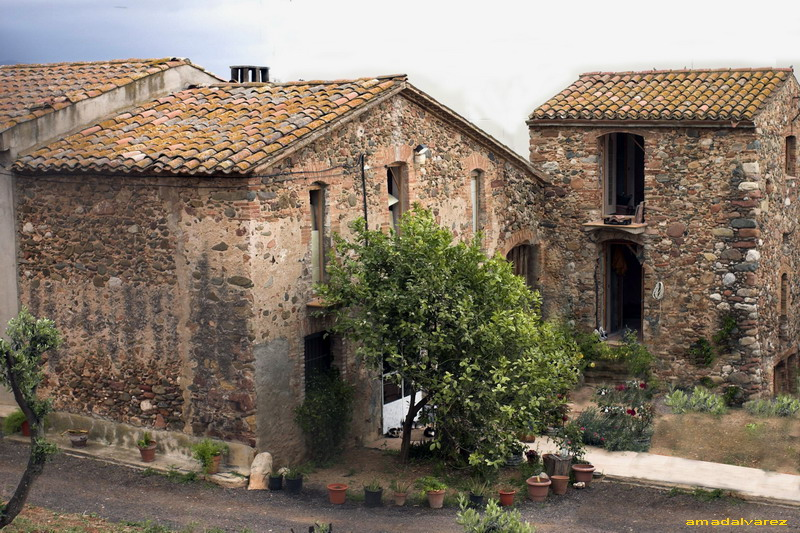
The Masia Mas Dorca in l'Ametlla del Vallès

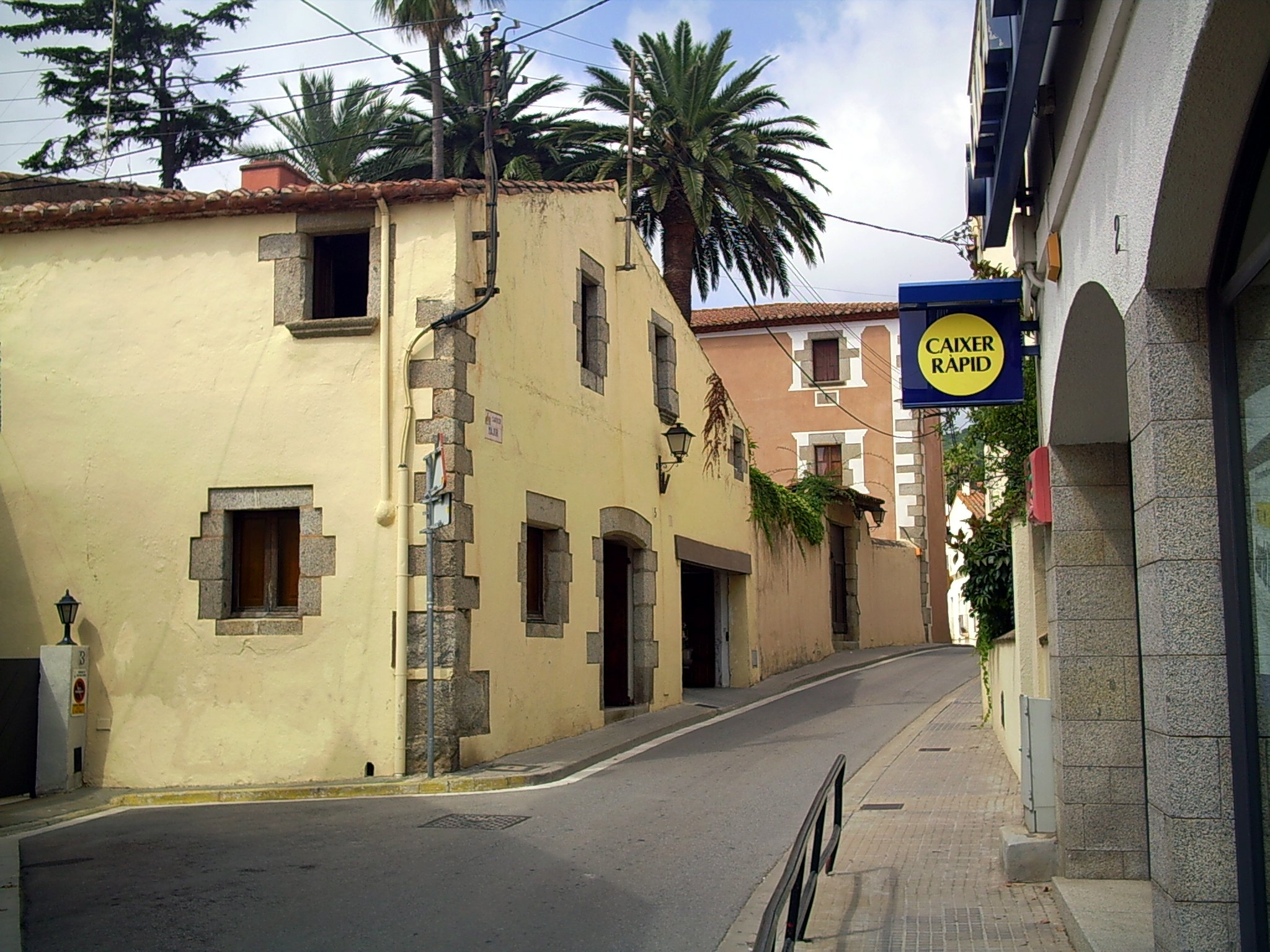
Can Mora, in Sant Vicenç de Montalt

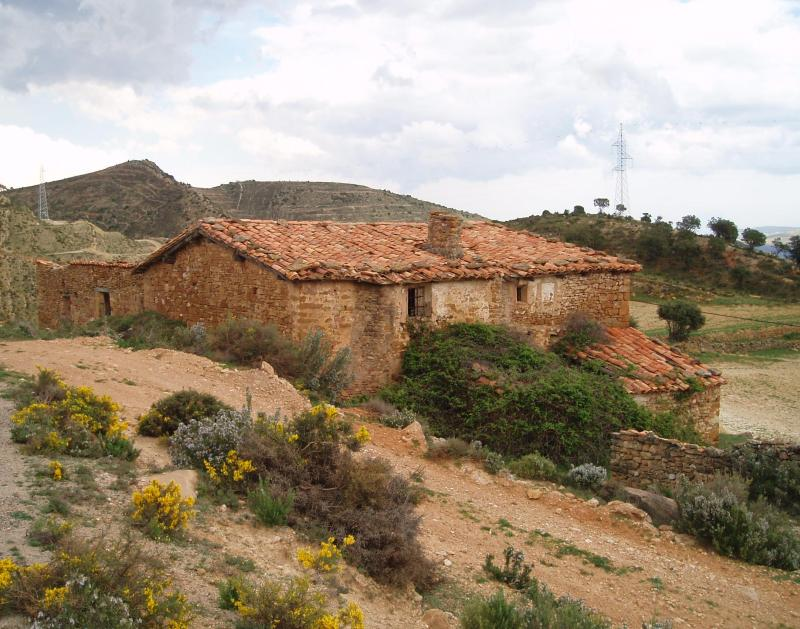
Masia de la Teijería, in Olocau del Rey, Els Ports

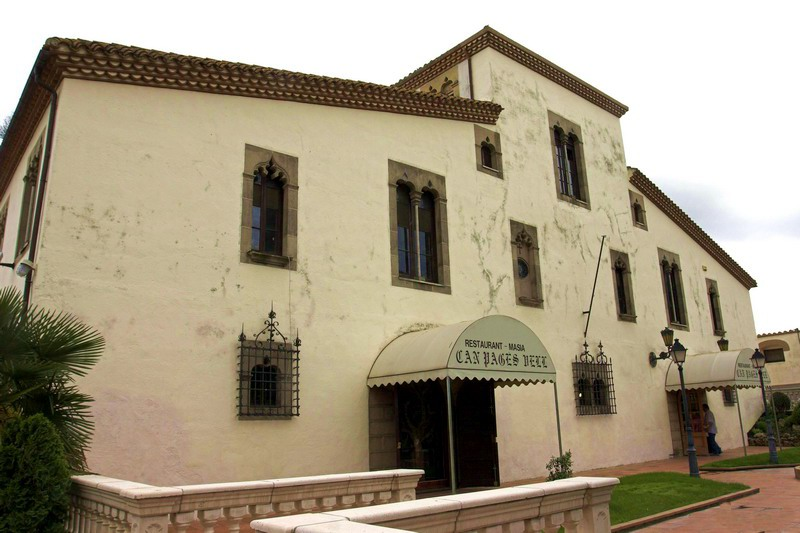
The Mas Can Pages Vell in l'Ametlla del Vallès

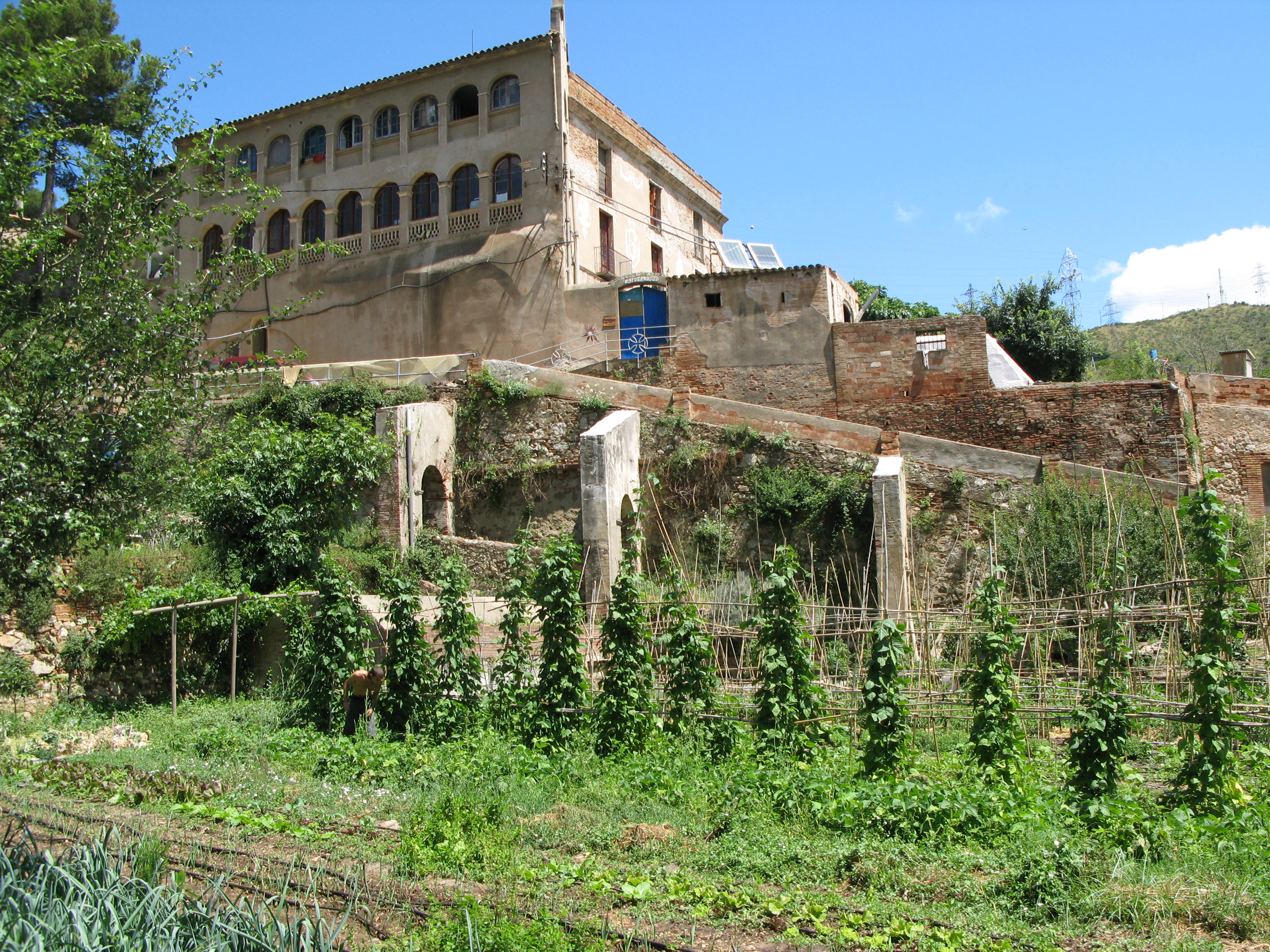
The Mas Can Masdeu, in Collserola on the outskirts of Barcelona

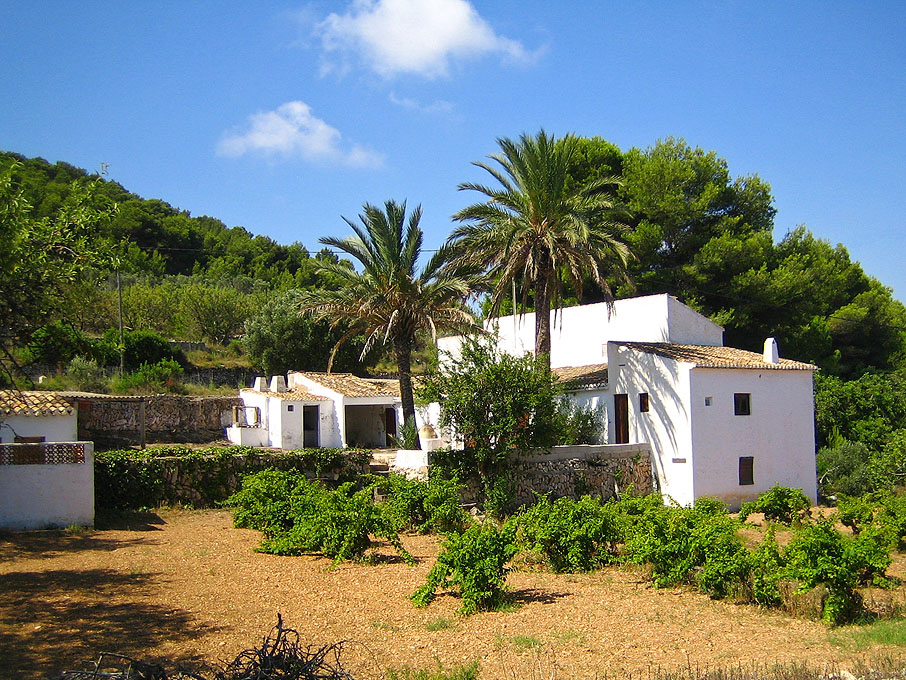
A typical masia in Xàbia

== See also ==
- Farmhouse
- Mas
- La Masia
- Ansitz
- The Farm (Miró)
