= Els Prats de Rei =

- Municipality
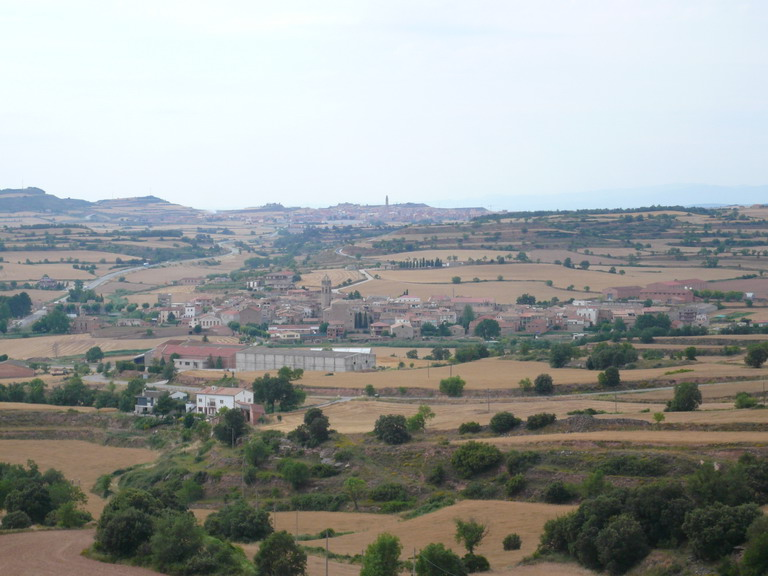
- Els Prats de Rei, with Calaf in the background

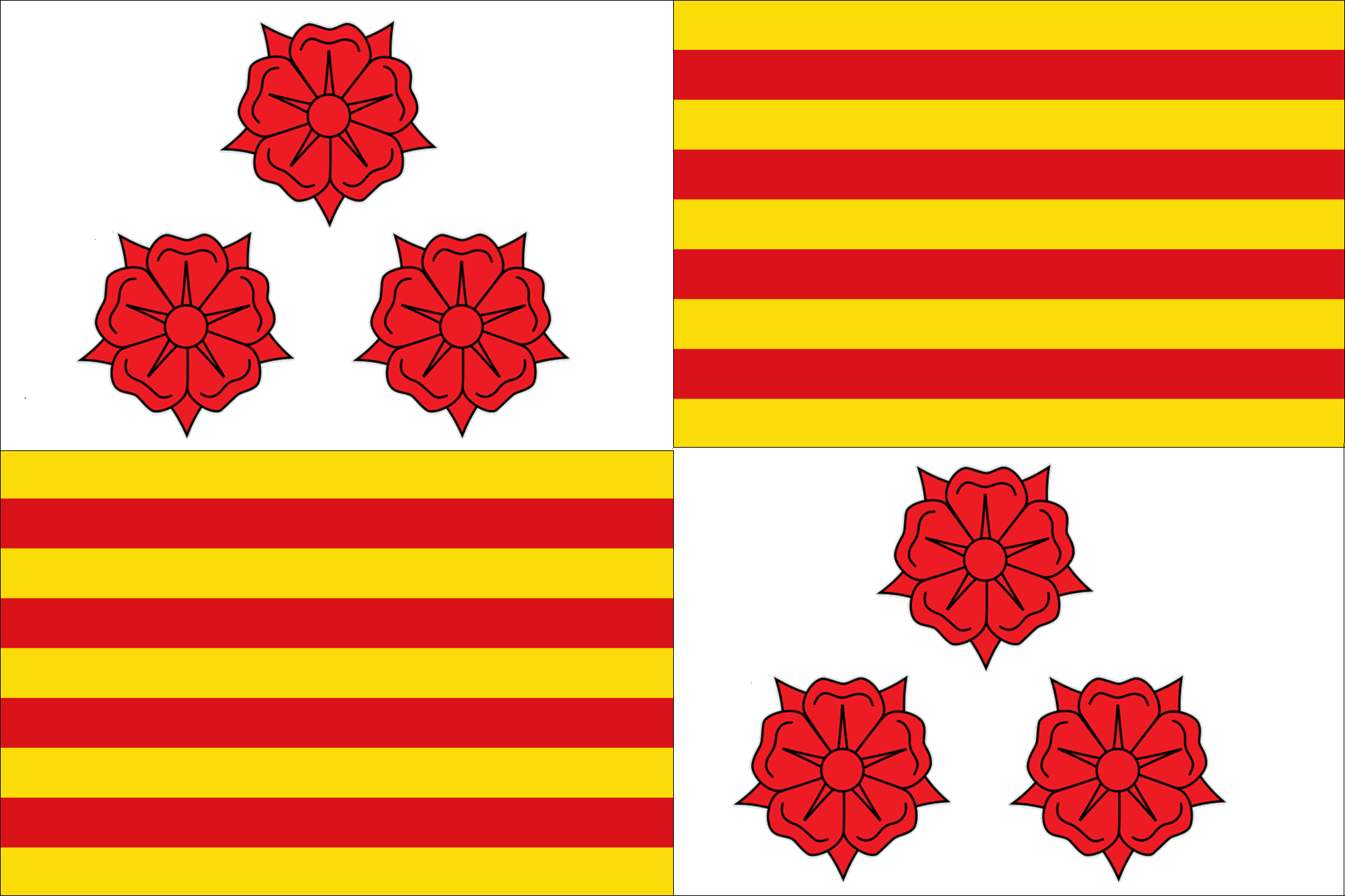
- Flag Coat of arms

- Location in Catalonia Els Prats de Rei (Spain)
- Coordinates: 41°42′27″N 1°32′32″E
- Country: Spain
- Community: Catalonia
- Province: Barcelona
- Comarca: Anoia

Government
  - Mayor: Maria Cristina Mas Soteras (2015)

Area
  - Total: 26.1 km^{2} (10.1 sq mi)

Population (2025-01-01)
  - Total: 554
  - Density: 21.2/km^{2} (55.0/sq mi)
- Website: www.pratsderei.cat

Els Prats de Rei (Catalan pronunciation: [əls ˈpɾadz ðə ˈrej]) is a municipality in the comarca of the Anoia in Catalonia, Spain.
