= Castellfollit del Boix =

- Municipality
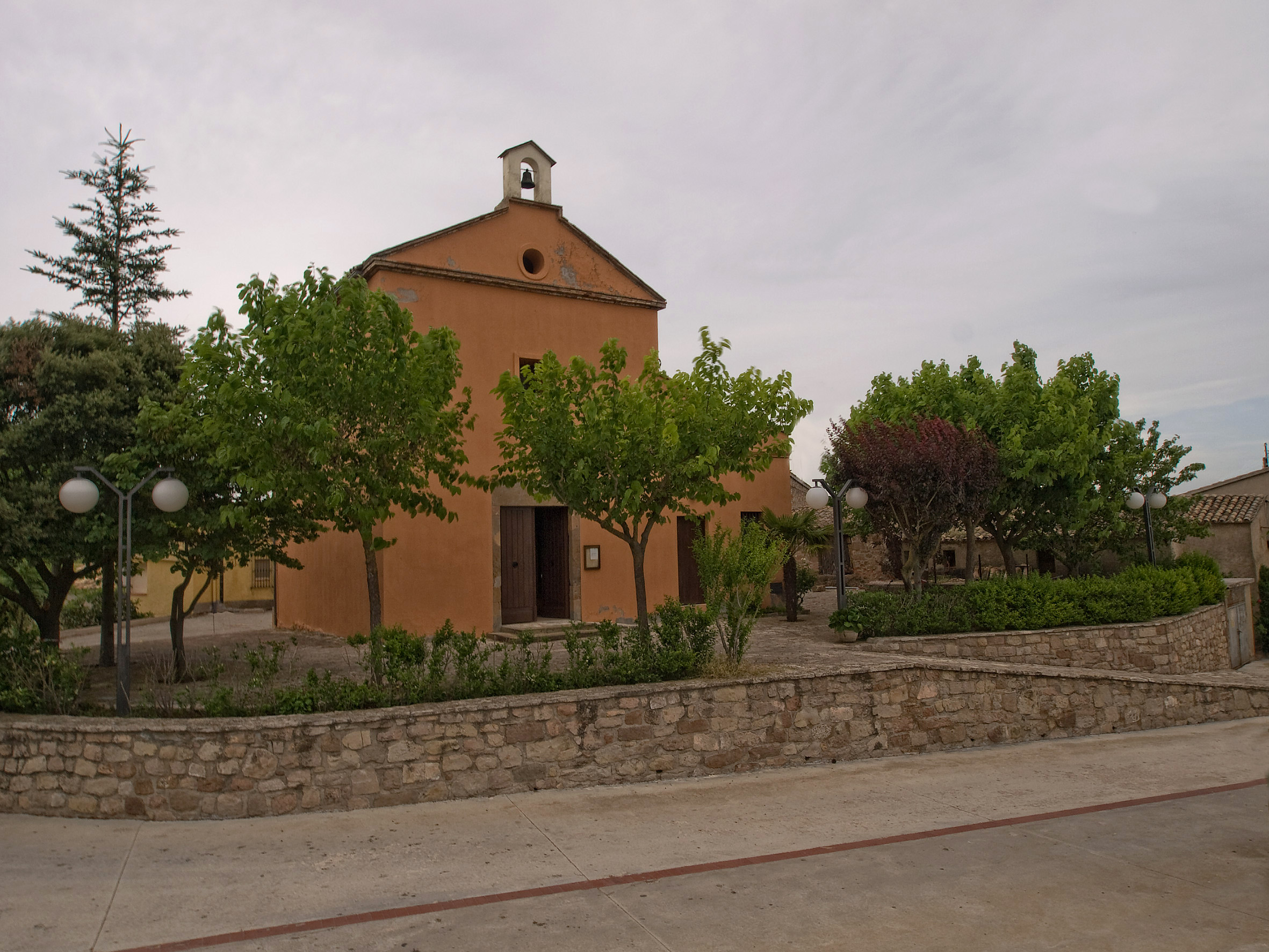

- Flag Coat of arms

- Location in Catalonia Castellfollit del Boix (Spain)
- Coordinates: 41°39′57″N 1°41′5″E
- Country: Spain
- Community: Catalonia
- Province: Barcelona
- Comarca: Bages

Government
  - Mayor: Celestí Rius Prat (2015)

Area
  - Total: 58.9 km^{2} (22.7 sq mi)

Population (2022)
  - Total: 460
  - Density: 7.8/km^{2} (20/sq mi)
- Website: www.castellfollitdelboix.cat

Castellfollit del Boix (Catalan pronunciation: [kəsˌteʎfuˈʎid dəl ˈβoʃ]) is a village in the province of Barcelona and autonomous community of Catalonia, Spain. The municipality covers an area of 58.9 square kilometres (22.7 sq mi) and the population in 2014 was 460.
