= Constellations (Miró) =

Painting series by Joan Miró

Constellations (a series of paintings)
- L'étoile matinale (Morning Star) 1940, Fundació Joan Miró
- Artist: Joan Miró
- Year: 1940 - 1941
- Movement: Surrealism
- Dimensions: 38 cm × 46 cm (15 in × 18 in)
- Location: Art Institute of Chicago, Cleveland Museum of Art, Fundació Joan Miró, Kimbell Art Museum, Metropolitan Museum of Art, Museum of Modern Art, Philadelphia Museum of Art, Toledo Museum of Art, Wadsworth Atheneum, and various private collections

The Constellations are a series of 23 paintings on paper produced from January 1940 to September 1941 by the Spanish surrealist Joan Miró. Art historians and museum curators have said of the paintings: "Universally considered one of the greatest achievements of his career", "The Constellations, as a group and singly, are among the miracles that art occasionally bestows", "masterpiece of world painting", "perhaps the most intricate, most elaborately developed of all Miró's compositions", "genuine masterpieces", "one of the most brilliant episodes of his career", and "As an optical experience the Constellations are entirely unprecedented, having no forerunners even in Miró's own work".

"In sum, given that music, nature, and life itself are the artist's sources of inspiration"; the paintings boldly celebrate nocturnal themes of wonder, joy, nature, love, and escape, although they were painted during one of the most troubled periods of the artist life. Initiated only months after the violence and chaos of the Spanish Civil War in his homeland while Miró was exiled in France; and later completed after retreating back to an uncertain reception in fascist Spain, as the Nazis invaded France. Exhibiting the paintings in fascist Spain or occupied France were not viable options, so the series was discreetly exported to the US in 1944 and first exhibited in New York City at the closing of the Second World War in 1945. The exhibition appeared as a revelation to an apprehensive, exiled faction of the European avant-garde and intellectuals as the first indication concerning the status of art in Europe during World War II. André Breton wrote that it was "the note of wild defiance of the hunter expressed by the grouse's love song" At the same time they were a direct influence on an emerging generation of abstract expressionist artists, particularly Jackson Pollock and the "all-over" aesthetic.

== History ==
=== Creation ===
Traditional accounts indicate that Joan Miró was dividing his time between Paris and his homeland, in Montroig and Barcelona, Catalonia, Spain in the early 1930s. With the outbreak of the Spanish Civil War in 1936, he remained in Paris in self-exile with his wife Pilar and daughter Dolores (b. 1931). Although Miró was not demonstratively political, on the occasion of the 1937 International Exhibition (World's Fair) in Paris, he accepted a commission for a mural from the Spanish Republic. Miró produced an 18 by 12 foot (550 x 365 cm.) painting titled The Reaper (1937, now destroyed or lost) which was exhibited at the Spanish Pavilion with Picasso's Guernica, and hence, publicly signifying his Republican sentiments in a high-profile forum that received considerable attention. However, one author suggest his more recent research shows Miró, due to economic limitations, was actually living in Catalonia full time from 1933 to the outbreak of the civil war in 1936. Coming from a relatively prosperous, property owning family, Miró was at great risk from the leftwing communist, anarchist, and republican militias (his brother-in-law was shot by a firing squad), and that his acceptance to paint a mural for the Spanish Republic's Pavilion at the 1937 International Exhibition was in fact a debt he owed the republican factions for granting him safe passage into France in 1936. On 1 April 1939 Franco proclaimed victory in Madrid, political tensions continued to grow throughout Europe, and war seem inevitable. Anticipating conflict, many artist began to withdrawal from Paris, Piet Mondrian moved to London as early as September 1938 (and later New York), and Breton, Chagall, Dalí, Duchamp, Ernst, Leger, Masson, Matta, Man Ray, and Tanguy among many others made their way to New York and other points of refuge in 1939 and 1940.

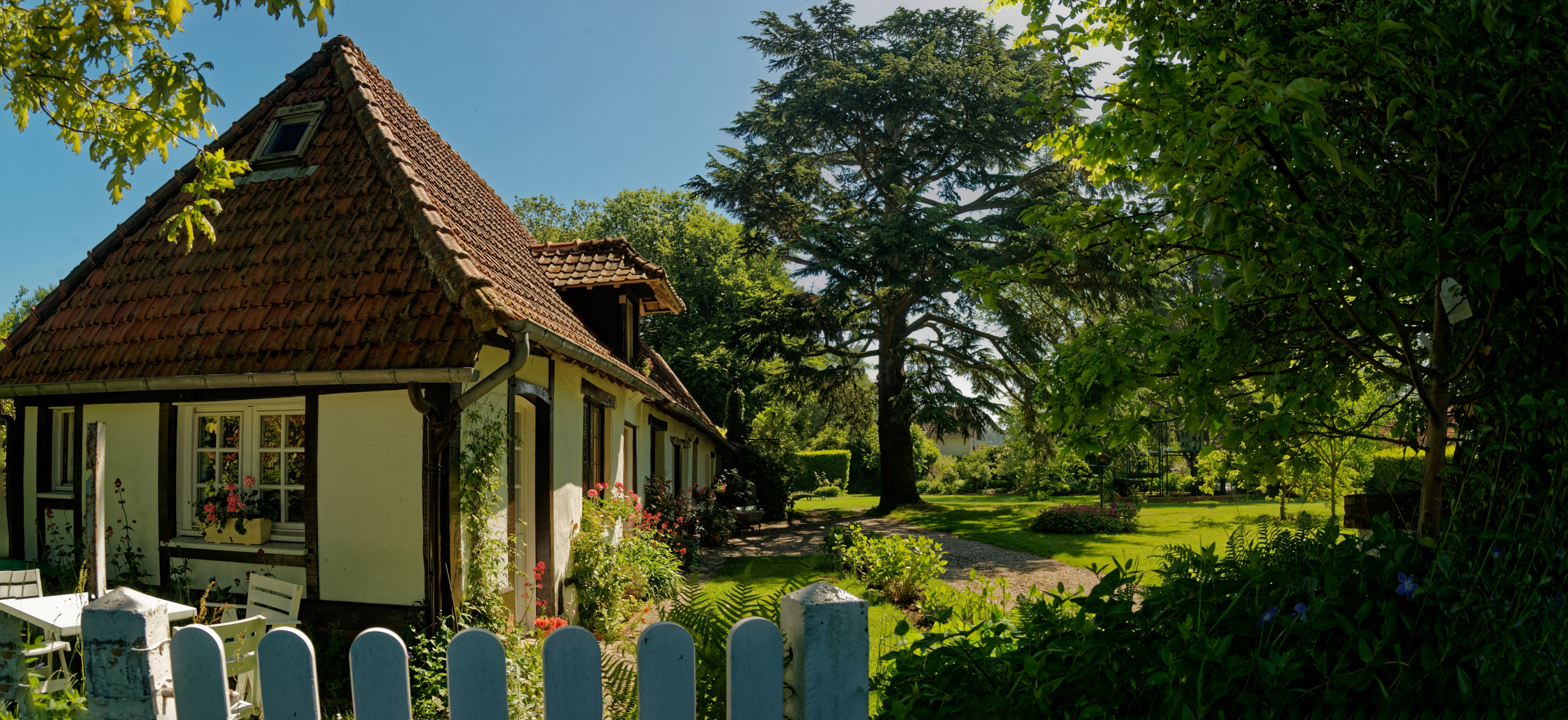
Typical cottage in Varengeville. This one is on the Route de l'Eglise, across the street from Le Clos des Sansonnets (photo 2010).

In August 1939, Miró moved his family to Varengeville-sur-Mer on the coast of Normandy, where he rented a cottage "Le Clos des Sansonnets" on the Route de l'Eglise. Miró had previously visited Varengeville where his friend, architect Paul Nelson owned a cottage. Georges Braque, an old friend and now his neighbor, had built a house in Varengeville nearly a decade before and spent several months there each year. Jacques Lassaigne stated Varengeville was "once a rallying point of the Surrealists", where Ardré Breton had conceived his seminal surrealist noval Nadja. Jean-Baptiste-Camille Corot, Claude Monet, Pierre-Auguste Renoir, and Camille Pissarro had also painted the scenic region decades before. Wassily Kandinsky visited Miró and Braque in late 1939. Despite conflicts elsewhere, the pastoral environment was conducive to work. Miró often produced work in series, and in Varengeville, he first painted a group of oil paintings on burlap on the theme of The Flight of a Bird over the Plain. The first of the Constellations, Sunrise was completed, signed, and dated January 21, 1940.

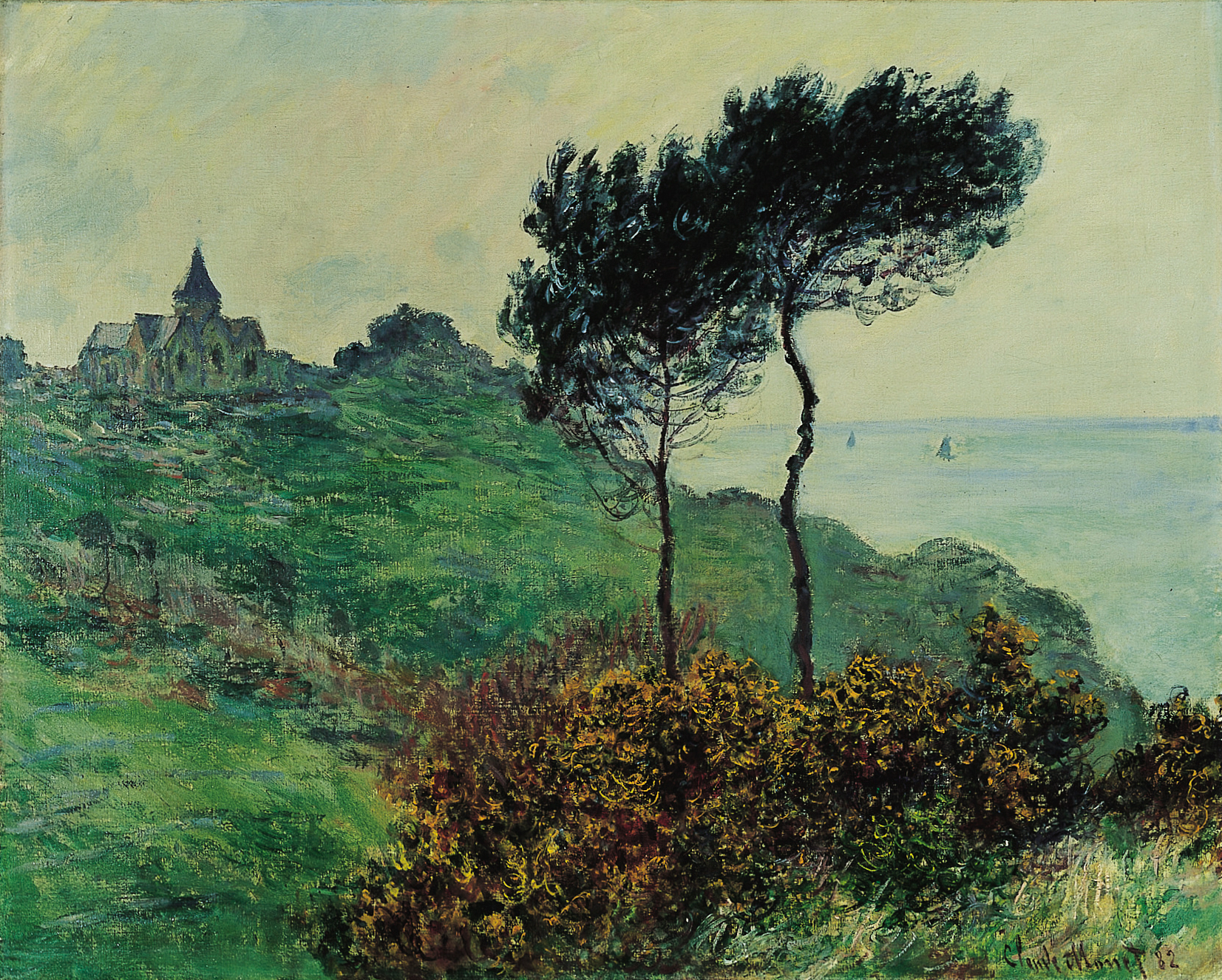
The Church at Varengeville, by Claude Monet (1882) located at the end of Route de l'Eglise, Georges Braque is buried in the cemetery.

At Varengeville-sur-Mer in 1939, began a new stage in my work which had its source in music and nature. It was about the time that the war broke out. I felt a deep desire to escape. I closed myself within myself purposely. The night, music, and the stars began to play a major role in suggesting my paintings. Music had always appealed to me, and now music in this period began to take the role poetry had played in the early twenties — especially Bach and Mozart when I went back to Majorca upon the fall of France. — Joan Miró 1948

Miró maintained a regular correspondence with his art dealer Pierre Matisse in New York, writing: "I've entirely resumed my regular life and am very satisfied with my work" (September 15, 1939); " I am now doing very elaborate paintings and feel I have reached a high degree of poetry - a product of the concentration made possible by the life we are living here." (January 12, 1940); "I am still working on the little paintings I hope I will be able to maintain the necessary spiritual tension until the end of the series. This long stay in the country has done me a world of good, this solitude has greatly enriched me." (April 14, 1940); "The countryside is marvelous here now: the apple trees are beginning to flower and the light is very soft" (May 2, 1940).

Miró completed the tenth and last of the Constellations that he painted in France, the Acrobatic Dancers on 14 May 1940. The situation rapidly deteriorated as the Nazis overran the Low Countries earlier that month and were soon bombing Normandy. The family fled in haste leaving possessions behind, Pilar holding daughter Dolores by the hand, and Miró with a portfolio including ten Constellations and the blank sheets of paper that he hoped to finish the series on under his arm. They made their way to Dieppe, Rouen, and Paris for a few days, where he briefly considered going to the US with Josep Lluís Sert before boarding a train south, joining a massive exodus southward. By June 1 they were near the Spanish border in Perpignan, France. After a week in Perpignan, they obtained a Spanish visa. A letter to Matisse from June 6, 1940, states:

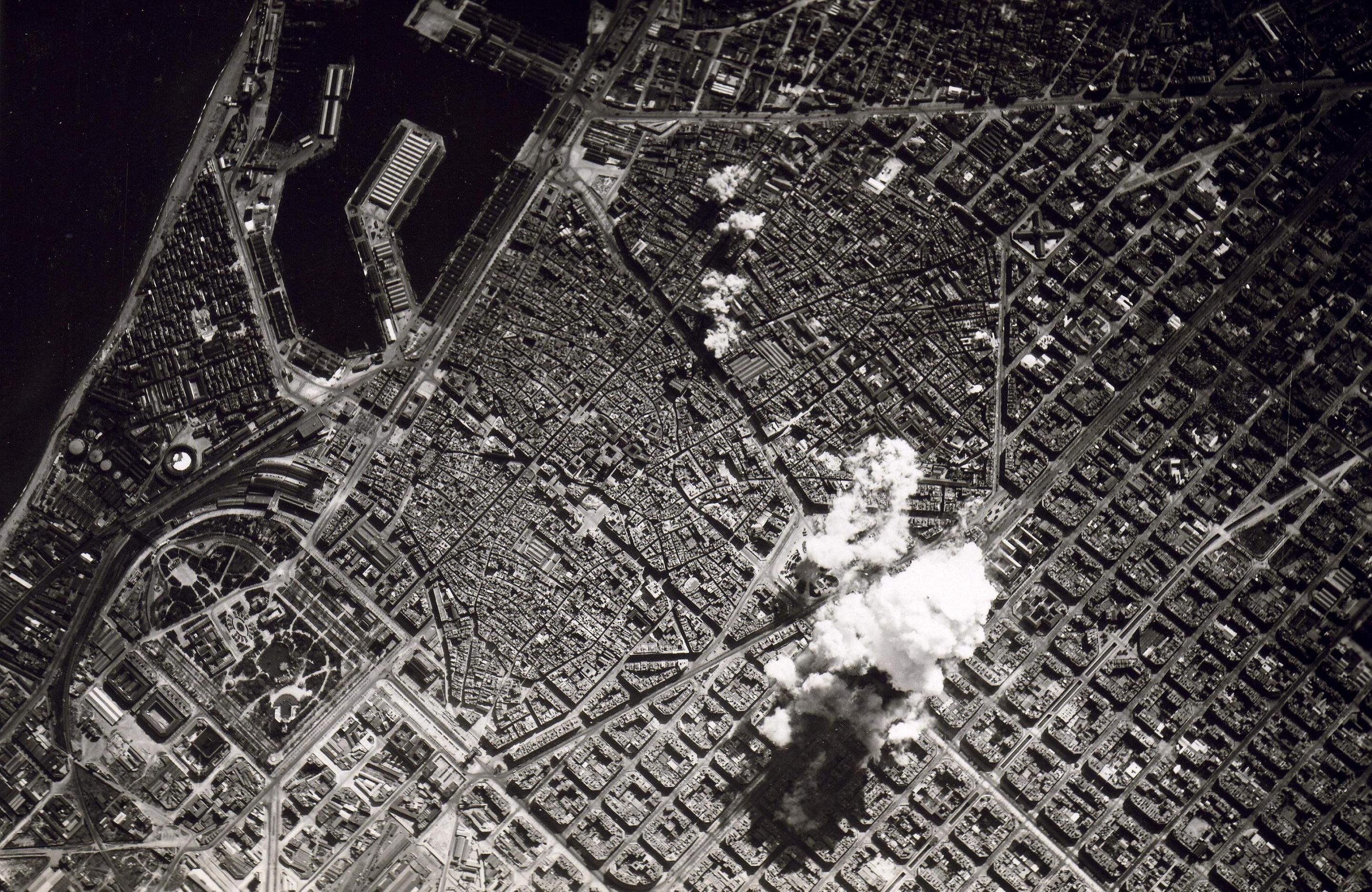
Aerial bombing of Barcelona by the Italian air force in 1938

Our journey up to now has been full of anxieties and unforeseen events, but we are now safe and sound....I've decided to return home. I think that this is the wisest thing to do at the moment to safeguard Pilar and the little one....I know that this entails very great sacrifices on my part, but I cannot allow my little family to remain in the midst of a tempest. We are thinking of leaving on the 8th.... I do not know what will await me upon arrival. — Joan Miró 1940

Fearing Miró might be on a fascist blacklist (in fact he was not), they surreptitiously moved through Catalonia for a few weeks, where conflict and fallout from the civil war still lingered, with leftist prisoners in the hundreds of thousands and food shortages, fuel shortages, black-marketing, corruption, prostitution, and epidemics were all rampant in the bomb-scarred cities and towns. On the advice and with aid of Joan Prats, they took a boat to Palma, Majorca (Mallorca) in the Balearic Islands in late July 1940, where Pilar Miró's parents lived, and tensions were lower. For a time he used his mother's maiden name, Ferrà, and his wife Pilar conducted the correspondence with Pierre Matisse in New York to avoid detection. After a hiatus of three and half months, on 4 September 1940 he completed The Nightingale's Song at Midnight and Morning Rain, in Palma de Majorca, the first Constellation painted in Spain, and the 11th in the series.

As I lived on the outskirts of Palma I used to spend hours looking at the sea. Poetry and music both were now all-important me in my isolation. After lunch each day I would go to the cathedral to listen to the organ rehearsal. I would sit there in that empty gothic interior daydreaming, conjuring up forms. The light poured into the gloom through the stained-glass windows in an orange flame. the cathedral seemed always empty at those hours. The organ music and the light filtering through the stained-glass windows to the interior gloom suggested forms to me. I saw practically no one all those months. But I was enormously enriched during this period of solitude. I read all the time: St. John of the Cross, St. Teresa, and poetry — Mallarmé, Rimbaud. It was an ascetic existence: only work. — Joan Miró 1948

Miró lived on Majorca for about a year and painted ten of the Constellations there. As tensions eased in Spain he began to visit Catalonia and eventually returned to Mont-roig del Camp to live. The final three paintings in the series were completed there, the last being The Passage of the Divine Bird on September 12, 1941. In November 1941 the Museum of Modern Art in New York held simultaneous retrospectives for Joan Miró and Salvador Dalí. The catalogue for the Miró retrospective by James Johnson Sweeney, covering the years 1917–1939, was the first monograph on the artist. After the Constellations were finished, due in part to scarcity of materials, Miró produced several drawings and small paintings, often works on paper in a looser approach. In 1944 he made his first ceramics and published a series of 50 lithographs known as the Barcelona Series.

=== Exhibitions ===
In the midst of the Second World War, showing the series in Europe was not feasible. Although Miró had not reached the status of Henri Matisse or Pablo Picasso at that time, by the early 1940s he was beginning to emerge as a major figure in modern art. In addition to his inclusion in many surrealist exhibitions and publications, the Pierre Matisse Gallery held Miró exhibitions almost annually from 1932 onward, and the Museum of Modern Art (MoMA) acquired and repeatedly exhibited his work (e.g. Cubism and Abstract Art and Fantastic Art, Dada, and Surrealism), culminating with a retrospective in 1941.

In 1940 Miró and Pierre Matisse had a contract in which the dealer received all of the artist's work each year in return for a monthly stipend. This exchange was complicated and strained with the escalation and expansion of the war. Shipping art and transferring currencies overseas were no longer simple routines. Both artist and dealer were growing annoyed with one another in not fulfilling their end of the contract. Furthermore, at the end of 1940, the series that would later come to be known as the Constellations (two years in the making), was only half finished. At the age of 50, Miró believed the Constellations to be among the finest work of his career, the culmination of his life's work, and he was not inclined to ship it overseas piecemeal to be unceremoniously parceled off. As early as February 1940 he wrote to Matisse of the series —

"I feel that it is one of the most important things I have done, and even though the formats are small, they give the impression of large frescoes.... I can't even send you the finished ones, since I must have them all in front of me the whole time to maintain the momentum and mental state I need in order to do the entire group. — Joan Miró 1940"

By 1944, in the chaotic years of the war, the paintings from 1940 had not been shipped, the monthly stipend had not been paid, and the contract had expired.

Somewhat presumptuously, Miró set his sights on bypassing Matisse and showing the Constellation at MoMA. He enlisted the aid of Paulo Duarte, a Brazilian lawyer and intellectual exiled in Lisbon who had previously worked with Philip L. Goodwin (Architecture Committee Chairman at MoMA) on a Brazilian architecture exhibit and was informally acting as an itinerant representative for MoMA in Portugal and Spain in the mid-1940s. In a letter (March 5, 1944) Duarte wrote to Goodwin "I think I have something interesting for the Museum: Miró has worked hard, but does not exhibit or sell anything. Even so, he has consented to send twenty-two paintings to be exhibited in the Museum and that I am going to send you". Although Miró seldom expressed concerns on how his work was exhibited, with the Constellations, he gave Duarte detailed instructions to relay to the Museum.

1. These paintings must be shown together; on no account are they to be separated from each other
2. I think they should be shown in strictly chronological order, which will explain my evolution and my state of mind
3. They are to be framed with double (plate) glass, so that one can see the title [Miró put the titles on the backs in the form of a "sketch poem"]
4. They are to be framed in a very simple manner, hung on a plain white background and widely spaced.

Duarte wrote Goodwin four months later (July 10, 1944) informing him 22 paintings, seven ceramics, and 250 lithographs (from the Barcelona Series) had been shipped on the S.S. Pero de Alenquer, and would arrive in Philadelphia in the last week of July. This was apparently done as a proposal to Goodwin, an Architecture Committee Chairman, not a curator of painting or sculpture. Duarte did not have a clear agreement or confirmation that the museum would exhibit or purchase the work. It is sometimes written that the paintings were smuggled in a diplomatic pouch, however this is unlikely, as the museum received the work not from an embassy or the State Department, but from the port in Philadelphia, replete with tariffs, and packaging, shipping, and insurance fees. Without elucidation, the Museum of Modern Art declined to exhibit or acquire the series and everything was turned over to Matisse, as Miró's American representative, although one gouache was soon acquired by the museum. Five decades later, Lilian Tone (Research Assistant, later Assistant Curator of Painting and Sculpture at MoMA), wrote "Owing to significantly larger costs than had been originally anticipated, the Museum was unprepared to pay for the shipment of the works to New York."

Pierre Matisse assumed the shipping cost and promptly organized a show for the Constellations and ceramics from January 9 to February 3, 1945. However Matisse ignored Miró's instructions on how the artist wished series was to be exhibited. The entire series was not displayed together. Only 16 of the Constellations were on exhibit at any given time, although the paintings were rotated during the course of the show, so each individual painting was on exhibit at some point during the show.

=== Series title ===
In the correspondence between Miró and Matisse from 1940 to 1944 the name Constellations was not used, the artist writes of the paintings using terms such as "the series" (Feb. 4, 1940) and "the little paintings" (April 14, 1940). Upon receiving the paintings in New York, Pierre Matisse calls them a "wonderful set" in a telegram to Miró dated December 27, 1944, and in writing to the artist on the status of the exhibition on January 17, 1945, Matisse refers to them as "the twenty-two gouaches". Although reviews of the 1945 exhibition described the paintings with phrases like "patterns of planets," "crooked stars," "crescent moons," and "constellations of shining jewels," the title Constellations was not applied to the paintings as a series. As late as 1948, when the paintings were discussed in an interview with Miró by James Johnson Sweeney, Miró was still referring to them as "a group of gouaches which were shown here in New York at the Pierre Matisse Gallery just after the war", "the series", and "this series of paintings in Palma". It is unknown exactly where or when the name Constellations was first applied to the series, however by 1957 or 1958 the term was being utilized, and Miró himself approved of and used the name Constellations in later years.

=== Collectors and Prices ===
The artist gave his wife Pilar, The Morning Star, and consequently it was not sent to New York or exhibited with the series in 1945. Pilar Miró bequeathed it to the Fundació Joan Miró. Pierre Matisse gave his wife Alexina "Teeny", Woman in the Night in 1945, who after a divorce in 1949 married Marcel Duchamp and the couple owned it into the mid-1960s. The Museum of Modern Art acquired The Beautiful Bird Revealing the Unknown to a Pair of Lovers and André and Elisa Breton acquired Women Encircled by the Flight of a Bird, both from the Pierre Matisse Gallery in New York in 1945. Some other notable collectors include Jacques Gelman and Natasha Gelman (Women on the Beach and Toward the Rainbow both now in the Metropolitan Museum of Art), Claire Zeisler (Wounded Personage), and Elizabeth Paepcke (The Passage of the Divine Bird). Some accounts of the sale prices for the paintings at the Pierre Matisse Gallery in 1945 state they sold for $700 each, others say they ranged from $400 to $500 (US dollars) depending on the individual painting. Nocturne was acquired by Stanley J. Seeger for $361,000 in 1983 and later auctioned it at Sotheby's in 2001 for $5,615,750. The Poetess was auctioned in 1995 at Christie's in New York for $4,732,500. Woman and Birds sold for £24,600,000 at a Sotheby's auction in 2017.

== Description ==
William Rubin succinctly wrote "Against a modulated ground of diluted tones he placed a labyrinth of tiny flat shapes linked by tenuous webs of lines. The compactness and complexity of these diaphanous compositions are astonishing."

There are drawings on the backside of the paintings, each outlining "a two-legged creature, within whose head the information concerning each work is written", including Miró 's signature, the dates of completion, the towns where each painting was created (Varengeville, Palma, or Montroig), and the poetic titles (which in some cases are rather extended lines), all systemically arranged and interspersed with intricate lines, circles, dots, ciphers, spirals, stars, and such. Miró stated in a letter from December, 1941 "I have indicated the date and the title of the painting, the latter written in the form of a sketch poem, this being important, as these gouaches exceed painting, so petty as purpose, to fully reach music and poetry”

Miró spoke of the series in an interview from 1948 —

They were based on reflection in the water. Not naturalistically — or objectively — to be sure. But form suggested by such reflections. In them my main aim was to achieve a compositional balance. It was a very long and extremely arduous work. I would set out with no preconceived idea. A few forms suggested here would call for other forms elsewhere to balance them. These in turn demanded others. It seemed interminable. It took a month at least to produce each water color, as I would take it up day after day to paint in other tiny spots, stars, washes, infinitesimal dots of color in order finally to achieve a full and complex equilibrium. — Joan Miró 1948

Miró describe some of his methods while working on the series —

After my work [oil painting] I dipped my brushes in petrol and wiped them on the white sheets of paper from the album, with no preconceived ideas. The blotchy surface put me in a good mood and provoked the birth of forms, human figures, animals, stars, the sky, and the moon and the sun. I drew all this in charcoal with great vigor. Once I had managed to obtain a plastic equilibrium and order among all these elements, I began to paint in gouache, with minute detail of a craftsman and a primitive; this demanded a great deal of time."

Joan Punyet, grandson of the artist, said in an interview at TV3:

The Constellations are a sublime break. They are the way to the power. Towards the universe. They are a door to escape from a circumstantial war, from a genocide, from the brutality of nonsense. The Constellations are like saying: my only salvation in this world tragedy is the spirit, the soul that leads me to heaven. That brings me to the sublime. It is as if Miró was a nocturnal bird able to escape from the earth, leaving the sky, traveling across the sky, the stars, to the constellations, to capture them all with one hand, and draw back to earth them on a sheet of paper.

— Joan Punyet

== Legacy ==
In 2002, American percussionist/composer Bobby Previte released the album The 23 Constellations of Joan Miró on Tzadik Records. Inspired by Miró's Constellations series, Previte composed a series of short pieces (none longer than about 3 minutes) to parallel the small size of Miró's paintings. Privete's compositions for an ensemble of up to ten musicians was described by critics as "unconventionally light, ethereal, and dreamlike". Previte's compositions had their American performance debut in 2008 with an eight-piece ensemble conducted by Christian Muthspiel. Featuring readings of Miró's letters and diaries by David Patrick Kelly, the performance was reviewed in The New York Times, mostly positively, which noted that large projections of the paintings behind the musicians were helpful in underlining Previte's compositions: "Some of the gouaches feature a gridlike clutter of dots and dashes that seem to allude, if obliquely, to musical notation." The performance was broadcast live on WYNC, which is available as a podcast.

== List of Paintings ==
The titles, locations, and dates were inscribed [in French] on the backs of the paintings by the artist. All paintings are gouache and oil wash on paper unless noted otherwise. All sheets are approximately 38 x 46 cm. (15 x 18.1/8 in.) although some are irregular and vary 1 to 2 cm. in dimensions. Orientation: V = vertical, H = horizontal. All works are in private collections as of 2021 unless noted otherwise.

- Le Lever du soleil (Sunrise) Varengeville: 21 January 1940 (H), Toledo Museum of Art
- L'echelle de l'évasion (The Escape Ladder) Varengeville: 31 January 1940 (gouache, watercolor, and ink, H), Museum of Modern Art
- Personnage dans la nuit guidés par les traces phosphorescentes des escargots (People at Night, Guided by the Phosphorescent Tracks of Snails) Varengeville: 12 February 1940, (gouache, H), Philadelphia Museum of Art
- Femmes sur la plage (Women on the Beach) Varengeville: 15 February 1940 (H), Metropolitan Museum of Art
- Femme à la blonde aisselle coiffant sa chevelure à la lueur des étoiles (Woman with Blond Armpit Combing her Hair by the Light of the Stars) Varengeville: 5 March 1940 (H), Cleveland Museum of Art
- L'étoile matinale (Morning Star) Varengeville: 16 March 1940 (tempera, gouache, egg, oil, and pastel, H), Fundació Joan Miró
- Personnage blessé (Wounded Personage) Varengeville: 27 March 1940 (H)
- Femme et oiseaux (Woman and Birds) Varengeville: 13 April 1940 (H)
- Femme dans la nuit (Woman in the Night) Varengeville: 27 April 1940 (V)
- Danseuses acrobates (Acrobatic Dancers) Varengeville: 14 May 1940 (watercolor, V), Wadsworth Atheneum
- Le Chant du rossignol à minuit et la pluie matinale (The Nightingale's Song at Midnight and Morning Rain) Palma de Majorca: 4 September 1940 (H)
- Le 13 l’échelle a frôlé le firmament (On the 13th, the Ladder Brushed the Firmament) Palma de Majorca: 14 October 1940 (V)
- Nocturne (Nocturne) Palma de Majorca: 2 November 1940 (H)
- La Poétesse (The Poetess) Palma de Majorca: 31 December 1940 (H) Ulrich Museum of Art
- Le réveil au petit jour (Awakening in the Early Morning) Palma de Majorca: 27 January 1941 (V), Kimbell Art Museum
- Vers l'arc-en-ciel (Toward the Rainbow) Palma de Majorca: March 11, 1941 (V) Metropolitan Museum of Art
- Femmes encerclées par le vol d'un oiseau (Women Encircled by the Flight of a Bird) Palma de Majorca: 26 April 1941 (V)
- Femmes au bord du lac à la surface irisée par le passage d’un cygnet (Women at the Border of a Lake Made Iridescent by the Passage of a Swan) Palma de Majorca: 14 May 1941 (V)
- L’Oiseau-migrateur (The Migratory Bird) Palma de Majorca: 26 May 1941 (V)
- Chiffres et constellations amoureux d’une femme (Ciphers and Constellations in Love with a Woman) Palma de Majorca: 12 June 1941 (V), Art Institute of Chicago
- Le Bel oiseau déchiffrant l'inconnu au couple d'amoureux (The Beautiful Bird Revealing the Unknown to a Pair of Lover) Mont-roig del Camp: 23 July 1941 (V), Museum of Modern Art
- Le Crépuscule rose caresse le sexe des femmes et des oiseaux (The Rose Dusk Caresses the Sex of Women and of Birds) Mont-roig del Camp: 14 August 1941 (V)
- Le Passage de l’oiseau divin (The Passage of the Divine Bird) Mont-roig del Camp: 12 September 1941 (V), Toledo Museum of Art
