= Maria Lluïsa Borràs i Gonzàlez =

Spanish art critic (1931–2010)

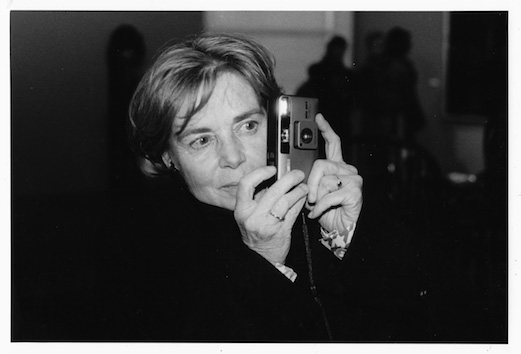
- Maria Lluïsa Borràs i Gonzàlez in 1982.
- Born: February 1, 1931; Barcelona, Spain
- Died: January 23, 2010 (aged 78); Palafrugell, Spain
- Education: University of Barcelona (PhD)
- Occupations: Writer, critic, exhibition curator

Maria Lluïsa Borràs i González (1 February 1931 - 23 January 2010) was a Spanish writer, critic, exhibition curator and specialist in the avant-garde and Dadaism. Borràs is known for her quote, "The critic is not a judge, but a bridge between artist and audience."

== Education ==
Borràs received a bachelor's degree in Humanities and Semantics from the Universitat de Barcelona. Several years later, in 1963, a Ford Foundation Award to participate in the Young Artist Project of the International Institute of Education in New York allowed her to reside in the United States and study contemporary art at the New School, as well as become familiar with North American contemporary art. She received her doctorate in art history in 1977 with a dissertation on Francis Picabia.

== Career ==
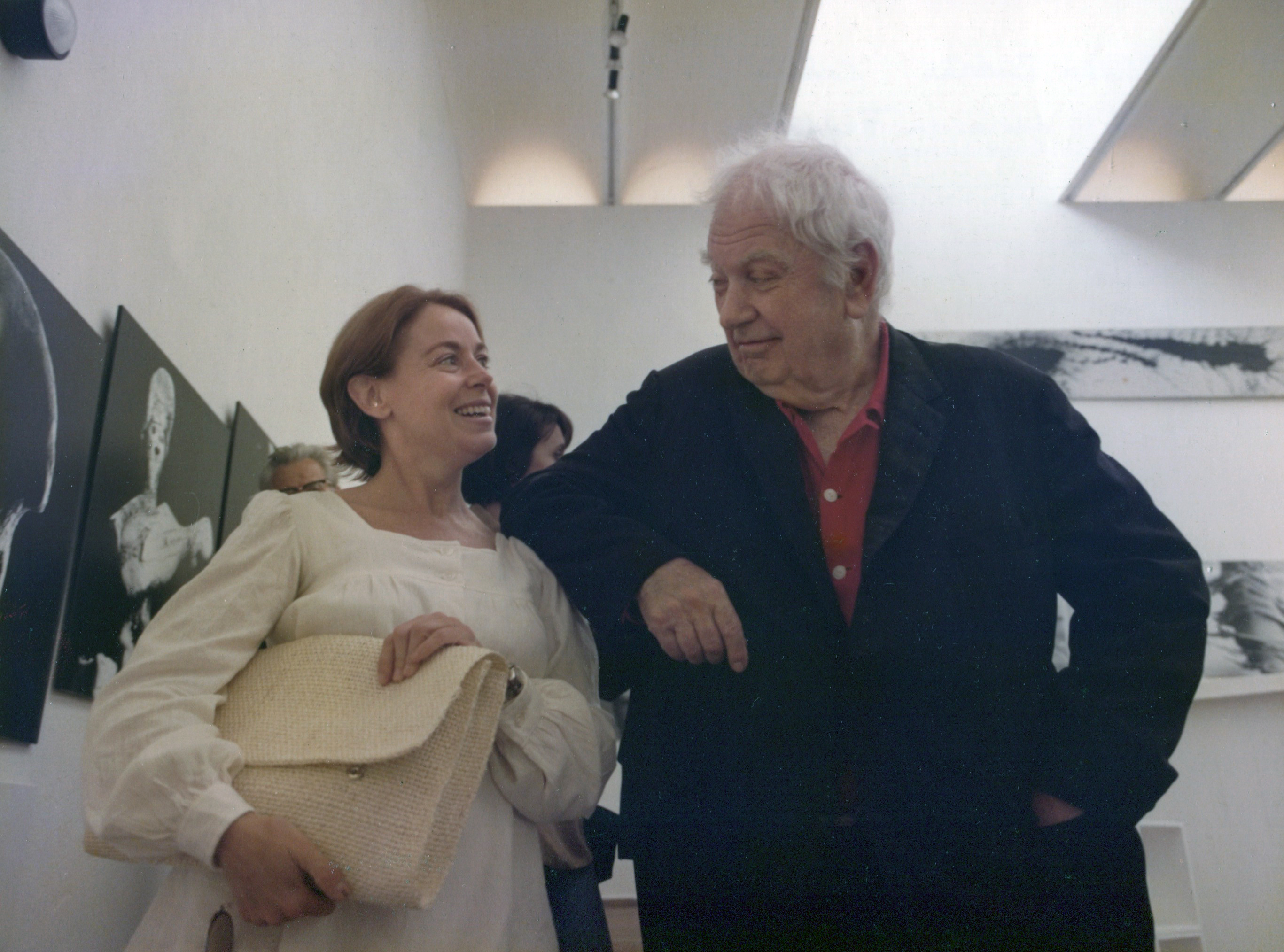
Maria Lluïsa Borràs and Alexander Calder talking around 1969 at the Miró Foundation.

=== Club Cobalto 49 ===
From 1964 on, Borràs was in charge of the administration of Club Cobalto 49, and was soon collaborating with its founder, Joan Prats, stimulating avant-garde art's promoter in Catalonia- in the third stage of visual books Fotoscop (1966-1979), as author of seven volumes of the collection. She made in two occasions also the photos: for the volumes "Domènech i Montaner, arquitecto del modernismo", and "Sert, arquitectura mediterrània".

=== Joan Miró ===
Between 1969 and 1973, Borràs acted as secretary to Joan Miró. Together with Joan Prats i Francesc Vicenç, she was the driving force behind the creation of the Fundació Miró, for which she was the general director from 1971-1975 and on the board of trustees, as well as the executive board, as she would later be at the Fundacó Joan Brossa, both positions of which were designated by the express desire of the artists based on her friendship and commitment.

=== Teaching ===
Borràs taught at the Universitat Autònoma de Barcelona from 1969 to 1974, where she collaborated in the creation of the first art department, giving classes in contemporary art history, and art theory. She thinks up as well a new course: analysis and criticism of art work. She was also a teacher at Eina school of design.

Borràs directed the art history section at Salvat publishing house, compiling encyclopedias and art histories in collaboration with Francesc Vicenç, Vicente Maestre and Eduard Carbonell between 1967 and 1973.

In 1985, Borràs published and extensive monography on Picabia, fruit of ten years' research, based upon her dissertation, which was translated and published in four languages and received the Premi de la Crítica, so becoming a reference book on the artist.

=== Writing, research, and new trends ===
Dedicated to the study and promotion of contemporary art, Borràs wrote texts and essays for several foreign, as well as Catalan, publications such as Canigó and Destino from 1968 to 1973, where she stood up for all types of contemporary artistic manifestations, giving special attention to all the happenings celebrated throughout the world. She collaborated in the art page of La Vanguardia for 30 years, from 1977 to 2002, and from 1969 on was correspondent to French magazines like Art Vivant, Opus International and Canal, amongst others. She directed the art magazine El Guía in 1987 and, during the last years of her life, moved to Palafrugell where she created the cultural magazine Vèlit from 2004 to 2007, also collaborating with the Diari de Girona and the Gironese magazine Bonart, fostering new trends, especially video creations and installations.

=== Documentary films ===
During the 1980s, Borràs founded the production company Proviart in order to promote Catalan artists. Working as screenwriter, director and producer, she made the documentary films Antoni Tàpies (1981), Pau Gargallo (1981), and Picasso nostre (1982). She baptised this collection Fotoscop Sonors in memory of and as homage to her mentor Joan Prats. At the present time these documentaries are conserved at the Filmoteca Nacional de Catalunya. The Fundació Tàpies is also in possession of a copy of the film on this artist.

=== Curator ===
As curator, Borràs organised some 90 exhibitions around the world of artists such as Aristide Maillol, Pau Gargallo, Xavier Corberó, Matisse, Magritte, Joan Miró, Picasso, Wolf Vostell, Joan Ponç, Arranz Bravo, August Puig, Marcel Martí, Viladecans, Frederic Amat, Roberto Matta, Man Ray, Beverly Pepper, De Sucre, Tàpies, Jean Arp, Dennis Oppenheim, Llimós, Cuixart, Olga Sacharoff, Joan Brossa, Enric C. Ricart, Warhol, Benet Rossell, Joan Rabascall, Xifra, Dorothée Selz, or Antoni Miralda, whom Borràs would present at the Venice Biennial in 1990 when she curated the Spanish pavilion. In addition, she was interested in the contemporary art movements of Maghreb and Cuba, as well as current Caribbean art tendencies, to whose artists she dedicated several exhibitions.

=== Works and monographs ===
Maria Lluïsa Borràs left a bibliography of more than 30 publications on the subject of art, including her work on the architect Antoni Gaudí (1972) and the opus dedicated to Coleccionistas de arte en Cataluña (1986-1987), as well as diverse monographs on Chillida (1974), Moisès Villèlia (1974), Carles Delclaux (1991), Porta Missé (1995), Wifredo Lam (1996), Ramon Pichot (1997), Andrés Nagel (2003), Floreal (2003), Dalí (2004) and Josep Niebla (2009). Not to mention studies on the work of Alexander Calder and Duchamp, which was especially attractive to her, as was the work of poet and boxer Arthur Cravan to whom she devoted the monograph Cravan, une stratégie du scandale (1996).h

=== Legacy ===
In 2004, Borràs moved to Palafrugell, her father's village, where she lived and worked during the last five years of her life. She died there 23 January 2010 due to cardio-respiratory failure.

A small part of her library - a section of over 20,000 volumes - was managed by the Gresol association thanks to funding from the Elsa Peretti Foundation. Finally, in summer 2019, the archive was transferred, always with the support of the Peretti Foundation, to the library of the University of Girona to become part of its Special Funds, which bring together private collections and libraries of prominent figures 18 . The Fons Maria Lluïsa Borràs is one of the most relevant collections on contemporary art and art criticism currently available in a Catalan library . It can be consulted here: https://fonsespecials.udg.edu/maria-lluisa-borras/.

The remainder of Borràs' private library and documentation was conserved by her daughter, Adelaida Frías, until January 2015 when she made a donation of them to MACBA. This private archive is made up of more than 60.000 documents of diverse categories including manuscripts, correspondence, photographs, audio visuals, etc., in addition to 1.500 books and magazines from her personal library.

Borràs sustained that the purpose of the critic was to share with the reader their knowledge as well as to give them keys to help their understanding of the work of art:

"The critic is not a judge, but a bridge between artist and audience". –Maria Lluïsa Borràs–

== Selected published works ==
- Niebla, pintura 1987–2009 Casavells: Fundació Niebla, 2009. DL: V-2204-2009
- Salvador Dalí, vida i obra d'un geni: Barcelona. Columna Idees, 2004. ISBN 84-664-0482-1
- Andrés Nagel, una década: Madrid. Turner, 2003. ISBN 84-7506-613-5
- Floreal Barcelona: Polígrafa, 2003. ISBN 84-343-1035-X
- Ramon Pichot Barcelona: Àmbit, 1997. ISBN 84-89681-13-9
- Catálogo razonado de Wifredo Lam (1923–1960) (período español), Volumen I, Paris: Acatos, 1996.
- Arthur Cravan: une stratégie du scandale Paris : Éditions Jean-Michel Place, 1996. ISBN 2-85893-194-1
- Porta Missé, Barcelona, Atika, 1995. ISBN 84-89433-00-3
- Antonio Zaya, Maria LLuisa Borras, (1995). Cuba Siglo XX Modernidad y Sincretismo. Spain: Tabapress, Centro Atlantico de Arte Moderno. p. 422. ISBN 84-89152-07-1
- Arthur Cravan: una biografía Barcelona: Sirmio, Qüaderns Crema, 1993. ISBN 84-7769-076-6
- Enric Cristòfol Ricart, de la pintura al gravat. Ed. Museu de Vilanova, 1992.
- Delclaux: artista i mestre de Tapís Girona: Col·legi oficial d'aparelladors i arquitectes tècnics, D.L. 1991. ISBN 978-84-606-0393-1
- Amèlia Riera, Barcelona, Ambit, 1990. ISBN 84-87342-59-0
- Porta-Missé, Barcelona: Danés, 1988.
- Coleccionistas de arte en Cataluña, Barcelona: Biblioteca de La Vanguardia, 1987. DL: 25081
- Picabia: Barcelona: Polígrafa, D.L. 1985. ISBN 84-343-0414-7 (translated to French by Albin Michel, Paris, to English by Thames y Hudson, London, by Rizzoli, New York, and published in Germany by Prestel-Verlag)
- Rencontres de Gabrielle Buffet-Picabia, Paris: Belfond, 1977. ISBN 2-7144-1113-4
- Wolf Vostell. Analogien und Antagonismen. Wolf Vostell. Zyklus Extremadura. Galerie van de Loo, München, 1975.
- Sert, arquitectura mediterrània (text and photography) Col·lecció Fotoscop, Barcelona: Polígrafa + Cercle d'Art, Paris, 1974. DL: B.13-626-1974 ISBN 2-7022-0097-4
- Escultor Moisés Villèlia, Barcelona: Polígrafa, 1974. ISBN 84-343-0197-0
- Chillida, Barcelona: Polígrafa, 1974.
- Gaudí, Tokio: Edita 1972
- Domènech i Montaner: arquitecto del modernismo (text and photography) Col·lecció Fotoscop, Barcelona: Polígrafa, 1971. DL: B.19.110-1971
- Arquitectura Contemporánea Japonesa (text) Col·lecció Fotoscop, Barcelona: Polígrafa, 1970. DL: B.44.701-1970
- Katsura Daitokuji Col·lecció Fotoscop, Barcelona (text): Polígrafa, 1970. DL: B.10.460-1970
- El Mundo de los Juguetes (text) Col·lecció Fotoscop, Barcelona: Polígrafa, 1969. DL: B.13.867-1969
- Arte del Objeto Japonés (text) Col·lecció Fotoscop, Barcelona: Polígrafa, 1969.
- Arquitectura Finlandesa (text) Col·lecció Fotoscop, Barcelona: Polígrafa, 1967. DL: B.36.522-1967

== Awards and recognition ==
- 1987- Premi ACCA (Catalan Association of Art Critics).
- 2004- "Medalla d'Or" Gold Medal for artistic merit from the Barcelona city council.
- 2006- induction into the Reial Acadèmia Catalana de Belles Arts de Sant Jordi.

=== References ===
1. Victòria, Combalia «Maria Lluïsa Borràs, en el record – La tancada a Montserrat i La Fundació Miró.». L’Avenç (cultural magazine) núm 402 -, juny 2014, pp. 36–41.
2. «Benvinguda a Maria Lluïsa Borràs, acadèmica corresponent per Palafrugell (author Frederic-Pau Verrié)» (in Catalan). Butlletí de la Reial Acadèmia Catalana de Belles Arts de Sant Jordi, 16-05-2007.
3. «Mor Maria Lluïsa Borràs, la lletrista de l'art català (by Ricard Planas)» (in Spanish and Catalan). magazine Bonart nº 124, February 2010.
4. «Exhibition press dossier "Tàpies. Col·lecció d'artista" - MLL. Borràs biografia, p. 18.» (in Catalan). Fundació Tàpies, 12-06-2015.
5. «Diccionari d’Historiadors de l’art català - Borràs González, Maria Lluïsa, by Daniel Giralt-Miracle» (in Catalan). Institut d’Estudis Catalans, 22-07-2014.
6. «Maria Lluïsa Borràs i González». L'Enciclopèdia.cat. Barcelona: Grup Enciclopèdia Catalana.
7. Borràs, Maria Lluïsa. Domènech y Montaner: arquitecto del modernismo (in Spanish, French, English and German). Barcelona: Polígrafa, 1971. ISBN DL: B.19.110-1971.
8. Borràs, Maria Lluïsa. Sert, arquitectura mediterrània (In Spanish, French, English and German). Barcelona: Polígrafa, 1974. ISBN 2-7022-0097-4
9. «Maria Lluïssa Borràs, crítica de arte combativa» (in Spanish). El País, 26-01-2010.
10. «Exhibition press dossier "Tàpies. Col·lecció d'artista" - Film: Antoni Tàpies, pp. 12–14» (in Catalan). Fundació Tàpies, 12-06-2015.
11. Punyet Miró, Joan. Al voltant de Miró (in Catalan). Palma / Barcelona: Fundació Miró, 2014, p. 70. ISBN 978-84-941239-9-3
12. Borràs, Maria Lluïsa. exhibition catalogue "Col·leccionistes d’Art a Catalunya" - text MLL Borràs p. 9. lines 14 to 17. (in Spanish). Barcelona: Biblioteca de La Vanguardia, 1987.
13. «Relació fons Arxiu MACBA -line 11» (in Catalan). MACBA, 31-12-2015.
14. «Id Ref, Le reférentiel des autorités Sudoc - Borràs, María Lluïsa».
15. Borràs, Maria Lluïsa. Arthur Cravan: une stratégie du scandale (in French). París: Éditions Jean-Michel Place, 1996. ISBN 2-85893-194-1
