= Barcelona Series =

Series of paintings by Joan Miró

- Artist: Joan Miró
- Year: 1939-1944
- Type: lithograph
- Location: Fundació Joan Miró, Barcelona

The Barcelona Series is a series of fifty black and white lithographs made by Joan Miró and published in 1944. They are in the collection of the Miró Foundation, in Barcelona.

== Description ==
This print series can be considered a forerunner to Miró's 1941 oil series Constellations. These black and white lithographs depict deformed images of animal and human figures. The pictures were a reaction to the Spanish Civil War, which was being waged at the time they were created. Even prior to the war, Miró had painted figures which expressed the pain of the forthcoming conflict in his Wild Paintings, such as in Man and Woman in Front of a Pile of Excrement. Here he used the printing skills he had been experimenting with since the 1930s to create a series that can be interpreted as either 50 individual pieces of art or as only one.

Miró includes distorted ogres who are impotent. The ogres could represent Franco and his generals, but are known also to be based on the fictitious dictator, Ubu Roi, who was created by Alfred Jarry in 1898.

The printing of these lithographs during the war required 350 sheets of paper. It is thought that the limited availability of paper led to the print run being limited to a total of just seven sets. After the publication of these prints Miró went to Paris in 1947, again taking a leading place in an exhibition of Surrealist Art, confirming his important position within that movement.

== Provenance ==
The images were created between 1939 and 1944 by the artist. They were printed at Miralles, a small printer in Barcelona, in 1944, after Miró returned from his self-imposed exile in France. Only five sets were created of the series, together with two artist's proof sets. Today only the location of two of these series is known. One set is in the Joan Miró Foundation and a second set is owned by the descendants of Joan Prats. Because of the censorship in Spain under General Franco following the civil war, it was impossible to exhibit these pictures. Miró at the time was in internal exile in Mallorca.

== Relevant exhibitions ==
- 1984 - Casa Elizalde . - Joan Miró Barcelona series

== Sources ==
- Clavero, Jordi.J (2010). Fundació Joan Miró. Foundation's Guide. Barcelona: Polígrada. ISBN 978-84-343-1242-5.
