= Moisès Villèlia i Sanmartín =

Moisès Sanmartín (Villèlia) Puig, Moisès Sanmartín i Puig, known with the pseudonym of Moisès Villèlia (1928 in Barcelona – 26 September 1994) was a Catalan sculptor and poet.

== Early life and career ==
In 1940 he moved to Mataró, where his father became the director of a cabinetmaking and artistic carpentry workshop, where he later worked. His first sculptures dated from 1947: they are figurative works of a marked oriental realism, in which his good learning of wood carving is noted, as well as knowledge of the trade that always have been apparent in his work.

In 1954 he made the first abstract works "Personatges" (Characters), that did not tend to be figurative, were shown as solo exhibition at the Municipal Museum of Mataró. Since then, he devoted himself exclusively to sculpture. In the "X Saló d'Octubre" (X October Salon Barcelona) (1957), he showed a change in his career: the use of bamboo, reeds, wires, threads, buttons gave his immobile sculptures a personal and unique look in which the concept of volume and mass disappeared.

In collaboration with architects, he made several collections in fibrocement the likes of a project for the Professional and Industrial School of Mataró (1959), work for the Baró de Viver School in Santa Coloma de Gramenet (1960). The first monographic exhibition at the Barcelona Museum of Contemporary Art (1960), then just created, was the public recognition of his work.

From 1964 to 1966, priority was given to the installation of several gardens with fibrous tubes, carved, painted and joined in different forms in the middle of the vegetation (El Masnou, El Prat de Llobregat). During his studies at the Institut Français of Barcelona, he went to Paris (1967), where he made numerous drawings for sculptures projects.

== His creative work ==
He went to Argentina and Ecuador (1969) and used Quito reeds. At the same time he made several stylistic-formal studies of pre-Columbian objects. From 1969 to 1972 he lived in Quito and Buenos Aires.

Back in Catalonia, he moved to Molló (1972). He has since made solo exhibitions in Mataró (1975), Barcelona (1974, 1976, 1979, 1982, 1983 and 1985), at the castle of Manzanares el Real (1977), Cologne (1979), New York (1979), Sabadell (1982), Granollers (1985), etc. He also made numerous series of artistic drawings and engravings, children's games and furniture designs.

He was part of the Club 49, founded by Joan Prats and collaborated closely with Oriol Bohigas, Jordi Estany, Enric Tous, Josep Maria Martorell, Joan Miró, Àngel Ferrant, Antoni Tàpies, Fernando Lerín, Sebastià Gasch, Josep Lluís Sert, Joaquim Gomis, Joan Brossa, Michel Tapié, Pierre Matisse and Jaques Dupin. He was a great innovator, not only for the materials used but also for his concept of sculpture. His works can be seen from the video by Tanit Sanmartin Roig at the exhibition Villèlia which was held at Espai Volart from April 6 to June 11, 2017.

== Brief chronology ==
- 1954 – First solo exhibition at the Municipal Museum of Matador.
- 1956 – IX Hall October Barcelona.
- 1957 – X October Salon Barcelona: his first sculpture in cane.
- 1960 – First exhibition of the new Barcelona Museum of Contemporary Art.
- 1961 – Direction, sets and costumes for the work of Joan Bros Bell held at the headquarters of the FAD.
- 1974 – First published monograph.
- 1976 – Exhibition Scala Caspar "sculptures, drawings," November–December 1976.
- 1979 – Exhibition of sculptures from November to December in the Sal Caspar in Barcelona.
- 1986 – Incorporate ceramics to sculptures from bamboo.
- 1990 – Retrospective exhibition at the Contemporary Art Center of Girona.
- 1990 – Monumental sculpture "Guardians of Water" in Barcelona Passe Olot in the commemoration of the Millennium of Catalonia.
- 1992 – Monumental sculpture for the public square La Brisk in Yataro.
- 1994 – Death in Barcelona on 26 September.
- 1999 – Exhibition at the IVAM (València).
- 2005 – Exhibition at the Montana d'Or (Girona).
- 2014 – Commemorative exhibition at Can Mario Museum in Palafrugell
