= The World Trade Center Tapestry =

Tapestry by Joan Miro and Josep Royo

- Gran Tapís del World Trade Center (Catalan)
- Artist: Joan Miró, Josep Royo
- Year: 1974
- Medium: Wool and hemp
- Dimensions: 6.1 m × 11 m (20 ft × 35 ft)
- Condition: Destroyed during the September 11 attacks

The World Trade Center Tapestry was a large tapestry by Joan Miró and Josep Royo. It was displayed in the lobby of 2 World Trade Center (the South Tower) in New York City from 1974 until it was destroyed in 2001 by the collapse of the World Trade Center.

== History and description ==
Saul Wenegrat, former director of the art program for the Port Authority of New York, had suggested to Miró that he could make a tapestry for the World Trade Center, but the artist declined as he would only make the work with his own hands but had no experience of making a tapestry. However, after his daughter recovered from an accident in Spain, Miró agreed to make a tapestry for the hospital that had treated her as a token of his gratitude. Having learned the technique from tapestry maker Josep Royo, Miró made several other tapestries with Royo, including one for the World Trade Center, Woman for the National Gallery of Art in Washington, DC, and one for the Fundació Joan Miró.

The work was an abstract design, with bright blocks of colour, red, green, blue and yellow, with black elements and a light brown background. Made of wool and hemp, it measured 20 × 35 feet (6.1 × 10.7 m) and weighed 4 tons. It was completed in 1973 and displayed at a retrospective at the Grand Palais in Paris before being installed in New York City in 1974.

The tapestry was destroyed during the September 11 attacks in 2001 and was not recovered.

== See also ==
- Artwork damaged or destroyed in the September 11 attacks
- Tapestry of the Fundació
