= The Caress of a Bird =

1967 sculpture by Joan Miró

Coordinates: 41°22′07″N 2°09′34″E

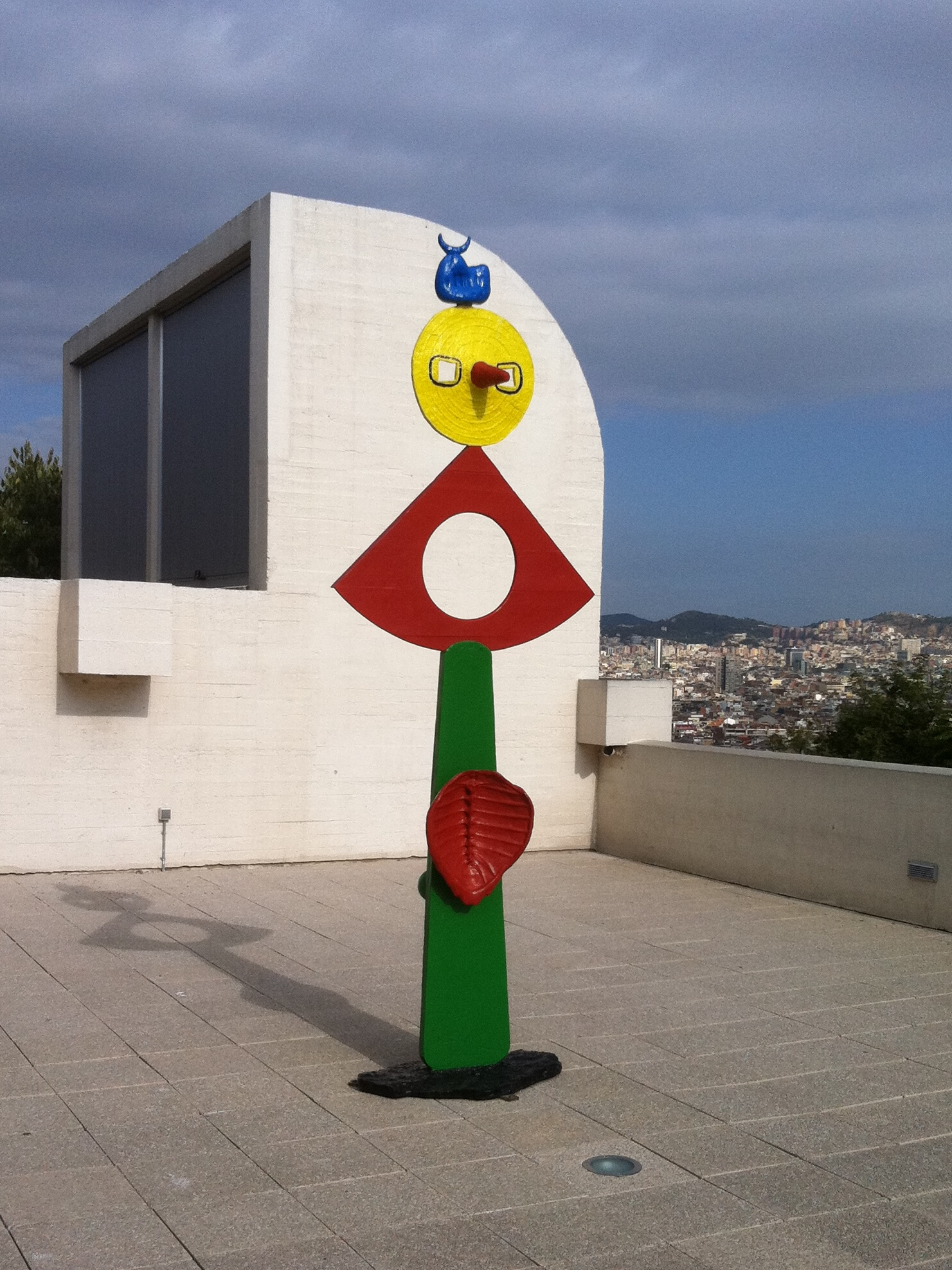
- Artist: Joan Miró
- Year: 1967
- Medium: Painted bronze
- Dimensions: 311 cm × 111 cm × 38 cm (122 in × 44 in × 15 in)
- Location: Fundació Joan Miró, Barcelona

The Caress of a Bird (correctly La Caresse d'un oiseau) is a 1967 sculpture by Joan Miró made at his studio in Palma de Mallorca. It is part of the permanent collection of the Miró Foundation in Barcelona.

== History ==
The origins of this sculpture are in the early object-sculptures the artist made in Mont-roig del Camp with found objects. The objects found were gathered at his workshop and then shaped into the artist's new world. At first, the objects were not placed in the right place; once the creation started there was a rigorous evaluation of their position by the artist. During the Second World War, Miró was alone in his ancestral home and landscape in Mont-roig del Camp. He was excluded from his artistic peers and the influence of art galleries, museums and exhibitions. He extracted natural forms and elements into a new artistic language of found object art. Joan Prats, Miró's lifelong friend and collaborator said: "When I take a stone, it is just a stone. When Miró grabs a stone, it is a Miró." In the mid 60s it was realised that the original sculpture was deteriorating and it was re-created in bronze by founders in Paris. Miró himself supervised the texture and controlled patina which he considered to be very important.

== Description ==
In this humorous sculpture Joan Miró uses easy to identify objects that serve as the basis of the design. The sculpture is over 3 metres (9.8 ft) tall and over 1 metre (3 ft 3 in) wide, but is only 38 cm (15 in) deep. It is constructed from bronze, disguised by the use of bright paint. The found objects now cast in bronze include an outhouse seat and an ironing board for the body and legs with a pair of miniature soccer balls at the back that represent the female buttocks. The head is a donkey's straw hat whilst the turtle shell represents the female genitals. The sculpture has been compared to a "totem of female sexuality".

== Bibliography ==
- Clavero, J. George Foundation. Guide to the Foundation. Barcelona: Ediciones Polígrafa, 2010. DL B.10.061.2010. ISBN 978-84-343-1242-5 .
- Erben, Walter. Miró. Taschen Publishing, 1/03/2004. ISBN 978-3-8228-2358-3 .
