= Naked Woman Climbing a Staircase =

1937 artwork by Joan Miró

- Femme nue montant l'escalier (French), Dona nua pujant l'escala (Catalan)
- Artist: Joan Miró
- Year: 1937
- Type: Drawing
- Dimensions: 78 cm × 55.8 cm (31 in × 22.0 in)
- Location: Fundació Joan Miró, Barcelona

Naked Woman Climbing a Staircase (originally in French Femme nue montant l'escalier) is a drawing done with pencil and charcoal on card made by Joan Miró in 1937. It is part of the permanent collection of the Fundació Joan Miró in Barcelona.

== History ==
Eadweard Muybridge's Woman Walking Downstairs in The Human Figure in Motion, 1887, work which in turn inspired Marcel Duchamp.

Miró created Naked Woman Climbing a Staircase during the Spanish Civil War. He was living in Paris when he started to attend life drawing classes at the school of the Grande Chaumiere. Miró returned to constructing the human figure to represent the drama that was then taking place in Catalonia. This feeling can be made out in the shapes used to draw this tortured nude woman climbing a staircase. Other works of this period include Still Life with Old Shoe and Aidez l'Espagne.

== Description ==
Nude Descending a Staircase, No. 2, 1912, by Marcel Duchamp

According to the Joan Miró Foundation, "Miró's despondency brought about by the moral tragedy of the war can be seen in the violent metamorphosis of the figure, in her heavy limbs and in the effort involved in climbing." At the top right is a kind of window or box where light rays can be seen entering the room. The woman is using her right arm to try to grab a ladder – this was a symbol that Miró used in several of his works to represent evasion or escape. The external genitals of the woman are similar to those of the woman in Man and Woman in Front of a Pile of Excrement as they are exaggerated in size. This work is said to be related to Marcel Duchamp's 1912 painting Nude Descending a Staircase, No. 2, although here the woman is ascending. The distortion and effort of the figure are interpreted as mirroring the Spanish Civil War. Duchamp's painting was not original; it alluded to the earlier photographs by Eadweard Muybridge which were amongst the first to record animal locomotion. Miró first saw this work by Duchamp in 1912, during the Cubist art exhibition held at Galeries Dalmau in Barcelona.

Muybridge's idea of a woman on a staircase caught the imagination of not only Duchamp and Miró but also Miró's contemporary Salvador Dalí who created a homage to Duchamp's painting. His model was also shown ascending the stairs like Miró's subject.

== Exhibitions ==
Start	End	Exhibition	Place	City	Ref
1964	1964		Tate Gallery	London	
1964	1964		Kunsthaus Zürich	Zurich	
20 September 1978	22 January 1979	Dessins de Miró	Centre Georges Pompidou	París	
1 June 1980	31 October 1980		Palacio de Velázquez	Madrid	
21 November 1986	1 February 1987		Kunsthaus Zürich	Zurich	
14 February 1987	20 April 1987		Städtische Kunsthalle	Düsseldorf	
24 November 1988	15 January 1999	Impactes. Joan Miró 1929–1941	Fundació Joan Miró	Barcelona	
3 February 1989	23 April 1989	Joan Miró: Paintings & Drawings 1929–1941	Whitechapel Gallery	London	
4 July 1990	14 October 1990		Maeght Foundation	Saint-Paul-de-Vence	
20 April 1993	30 August 1993		Fundació Joan Miró	Barcelona	
6 October 1993	11 January 1994		Museum of Modern Art	New York	
11 February 1995	17 April 1995		Städtische Kunsthalle	Düsseldorf	
12 May 1995	16 July 1995		Kunsthalle Wien	Vienna	
28 July 1995	22 October 1995		Galleria d'Arte Moderna e Contemporanea de Verona	Verona	
26 February 1996	5 May 1996		CCCB	Barcelona	
7 June 1997	11 November 1997	Miró, ceci est la couleur de mes rêves	Fondation Pierre Gianadda	Martigny	
15 May 1998	30 August 1998	Joan Miró. Creator of new worlds	Moderna Museet	Stockholm	
18 September 1998	10 January 1999	Joan Miró. Creator of new worlds	Louisiana Museum of Modern Art	Humlebæk	
4 July 2000	5 November 2000		Maeght Foundation	Saint-Paul-de-Vence	
23 October 2001	27 January 2002	Rèquiem per les escales	CCCB	Barcelona	
6 March 2002	24 June 2002	La Révolution surréaliste	Centre Georges Pompidou	Paris	
20 July 2002	24 November 2002		Kunstsammlung Nordrhein-Westfalen	Düsseldorf	
25 November 2004	6 February 2005	Joan Miró. Arquitectura d'un llibre	Fundació Joan Miró	Barcelona	
25 October 2007	27 January 2008	Joan Miró. 1956–1983 Sentiment, emoció i gest	Fundació Joan Miró	Barcelona	
14 April 2011	11 September 2011	Miró.	Tate	London	
15 October 2011	18 March 2011	Miró i l'escala de l'evasió.	Tate, Fundació Joan Miró	London & Barcelona	
6 May 2012	12 August 2012		National Gallery of Art	Washington	

== 2011 exhibition ==
The exhibition L'escala de l'evasió that opened in October 2011 was supported by access to Wikipedia using QRpedia codes that allowed access to visitors in Catalan, English and several other languages.
