= Tapestry of the Fundació =

Tapestry by Joan Miró and Josep Royo

- Artists: Joan Miró and Josep Royo
- Year: 1979
- Medium: tapestry
- Subject: woman and a bird
- Dimensions: 750x500
- Location: Fundació Joan Miró, Barcelona
- Website: www.fmirobcn.org/en/colection/catalog-works/9389/p-em-tapestry-of-the-fundacio-em-p

The Tapestry of the Fundació is a tapestry made by Joan Miró and Josep Royo in 1979 and that is conserved in the Fundació Joan Miró, in Barcelona.

== History ==
At the beginning of the 1970s Joan Miró began to collaborate with Josep Royo from an exhibition in Barcelona's Sala Gaspar. Miró began to produce sobreteixims, works that are halfway between painting, collage and tapestry. Later, following the assignment of the Great Tapestry of the World Trade Center and the Tapestry of the National Gallery of Washington, Miró decided to make another one for the Foundation that bears his name in Barcelona, specially conceived for the space where it would be installed. It has been on display at the same location since 1979, and it was conceived by Miró as a huge fresco.

== See also ==
- The World Trade Center Tapestry
