= Nude Descending a Staircase, No. 2 =

Painting by Marcel Duchamp

- Nu descendant un escalier n° 2 (French)
- Artist: Marcel Duchamp
- Year: 1912
- Medium: Oil on canvas
- Dimensions: 147 cm × 89.2 cm (57 7/8 in × 35 1/8 in)
- Location: Philadelphia Museum of Art, Philadelphia

Nude Descending a Staircase, No. 2 (French: Nu descendant un escalier n° 2) is a 1912 painting by Marcel Duchamp. The work is widely regarded as a Modernist classic and has become one of the most famous of its time. Before its first presentation at the 1912 Salon des Indépendants in Paris it was rejected by the Cubists as being too Futurist. It was then exhibited with the Cubists at Galeries Dalmau's Exposició d'Art Cubista, in Barcelona, 20 April – 10 May 1912. The painting was subsequently shown, and ridiculed, at the 1913 Armory Show in New York City.

Nude Descending a Staircase, No. 2 was reproduced by Guillaume Apollinaire in his 1913 book, Les Peintres Cubistes, Méditations Esthétiques. It is now in the Louise and Walter Arensberg Collection of the Philadelphia Museum of Art.

== Description ==
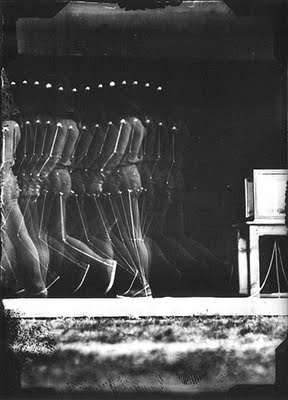
Étienne-Jules Marey: Man Walking, 1890–91

The work, an oil painting on canvas with dimensions of 147 cm × 89.2 cm (57.9 in × 35.1 in) in portrait, seemingly depicts a figure demonstrating an abstract movement in its ochres and browns. The discernible "body parts" of the figure are composed of nested, conical and cylindrical abstract elements, assembled together in such a way as to suggest rhythm and convey the movement of the figure merging into itself. Dark outlines limit the contours of the body while serving as motion lines that emphasize the dynamics of the moving figure, while the accented arcs of the dotted lines seem to suggest a thrusting pelvic motion. The movement seems to be rotated counterclockwise from the upper left to the lower right corner, where the gradient of the apparently frozen sequence corresponding to the bottom right to top left dark, respectively, becomes more transparent, the fading of which is apparently intended to simulate the "older" section. At the edges of the picture, the steps are indicated in darker colors. The center of the image is an amalgam of light and dark, that becomes more piqued approaching the edges. The overall warm, monochrome bright palette ranges from yellow ochre to dark, almost black tones. The colors are translucent. At the bottom left Duchamp placed the title "NU DESCENDANT UN ESCALIER" in block letters, which may or may not be related to the work. The question of whether the figure represents a human body remains unanswered; the figure provides no clues to its age, individuality, or character, while the gender of "nu" is male. Shortly before his unexpected death in 1967, in an interview with Pierre Cabanne, Duchamp commented on the surprising success of Nude Descending a Staircase, No. 2 at the Armory Show (see below). "What contributed to the interest provoked by the canvas was its title. One just doesn't do a nude woman coming down the stairs ... it seemed scandalous."

== Background ==
Modern GIF of Eadweard Muybridge: Woman Walking Downstairs – 1887

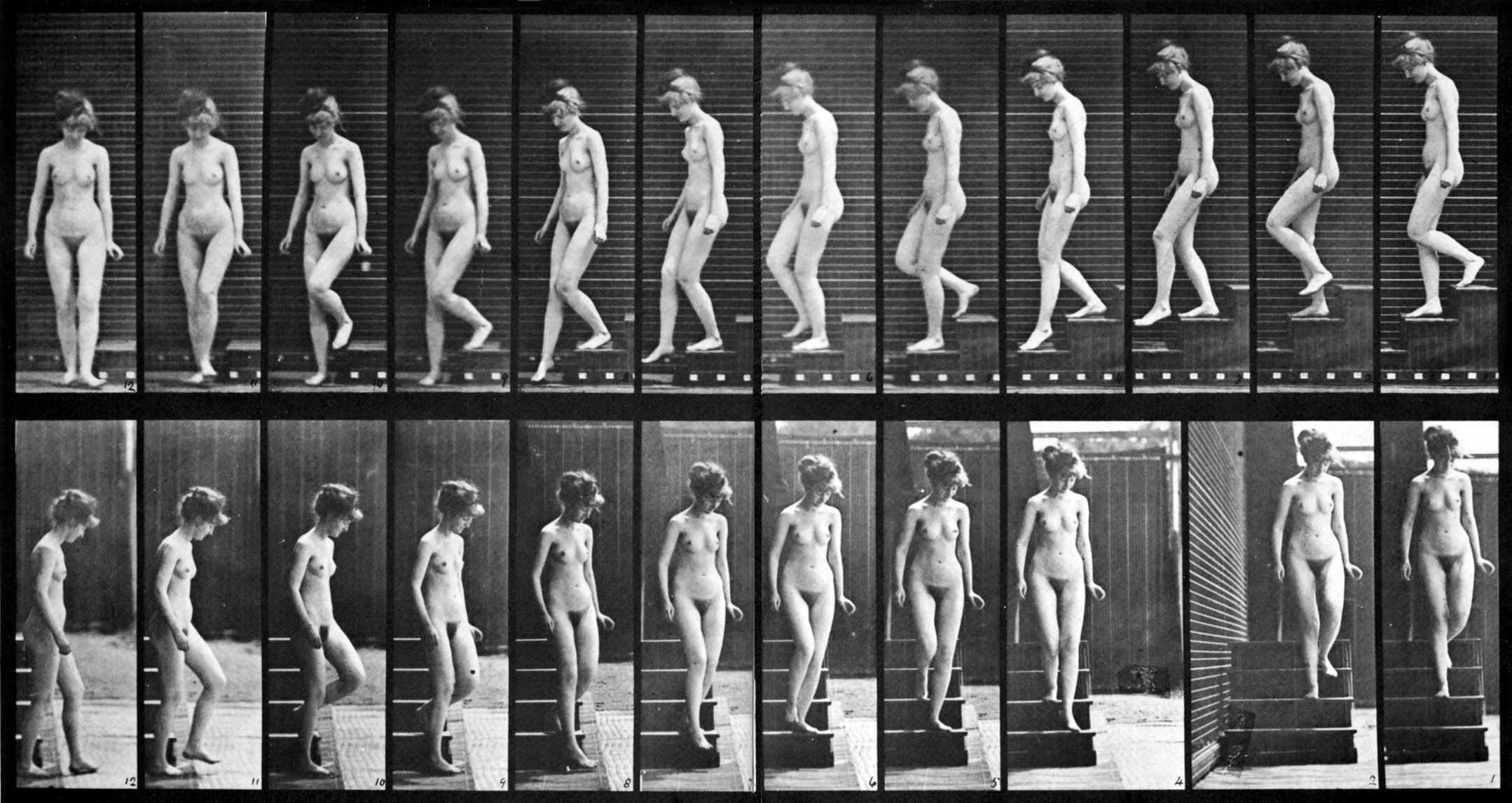
Corresponding still photos by Eadweard Muybridge

The painting combines elements of both the Cubist and Futurist movements. In the composition, Duchamp depicts motion by successive superimposed images, similar to stroboscopic motion photography. Duchamp also recognized the influence of the chronophotography of Étienne-Jules Marey and others, particularly Muybridge's Woman Walking Downstairs from his 1887 picture series, published as The Human Figure in Motion.

Duchamp submitted the work to appear with the Cubists at the 28th exhibition of the Société des Artistes Indépendants, Paris, 25 March through 16 May 1912. It appeared under the number 1001 of the catalogue, entitled simply Nu descendant l'escalier, not Nu descendant un escalier n° 2. This catalogue revealed the title of the painting to the general public for the first time, even though the painting itself would be absent from the exhibition.

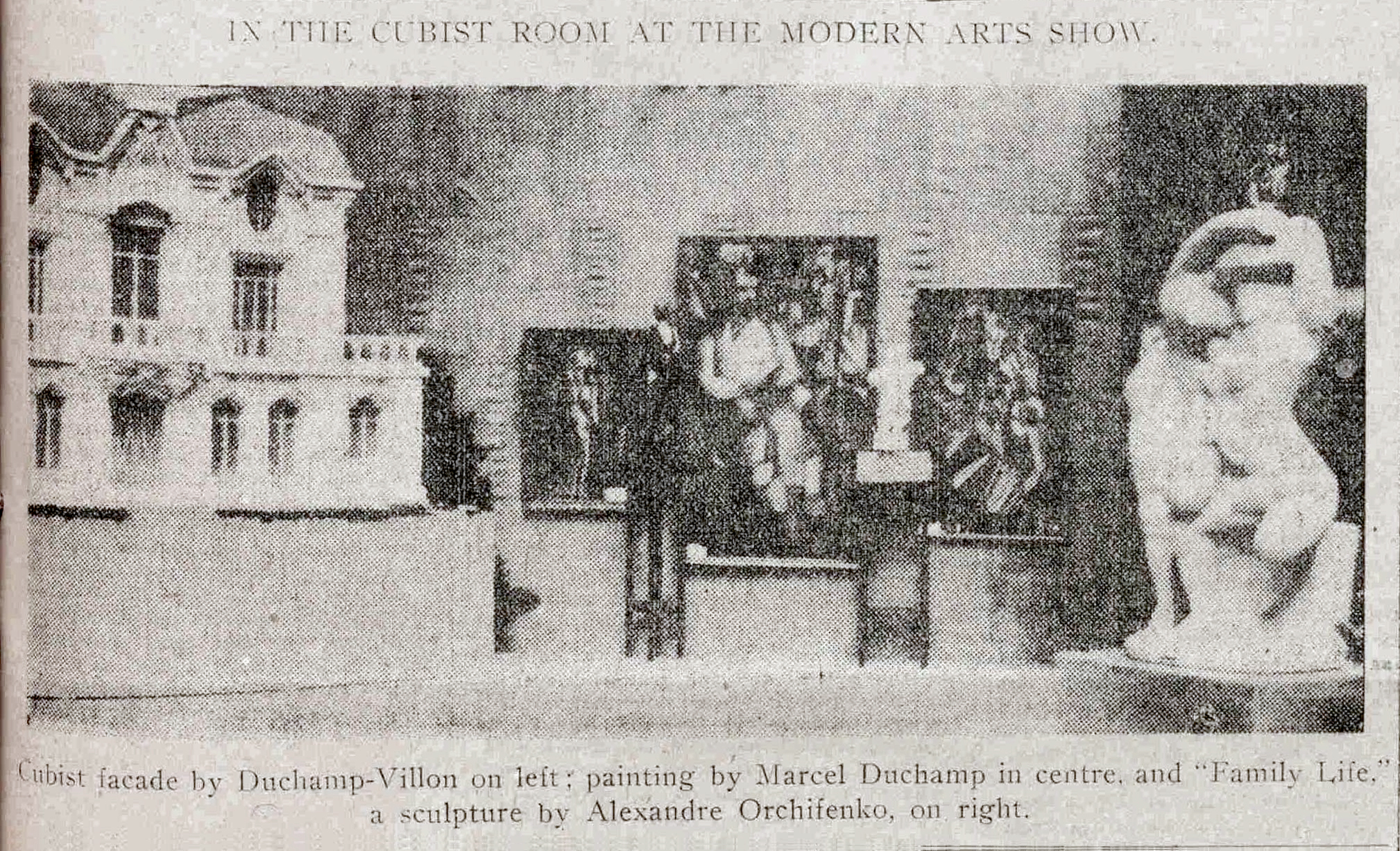
Armory Show, 1913, the Cubist room, with works by Raymond Duchamp-Villon, Albert Gleizes, Marcel Duchamp and Alexander Archipenko

Duchamp's brothers, Jacques Villon and Raymond Duchamp-Villon, sent by the hanging committee, asked him to voluntarily withdraw the painting, or paint over the title and rename it something else. According to Duchamp, Cubists such as Albert Gleizes found that his nude wasn't quite in line with what they had already investigated [tracée]. The hanging committee objected to the work, Duchamp stressed, on the grounds that it had "too much of a literary title", and that "one doesn't paint a nude descending a staircase, that's ridiculous... a nude should be respected".

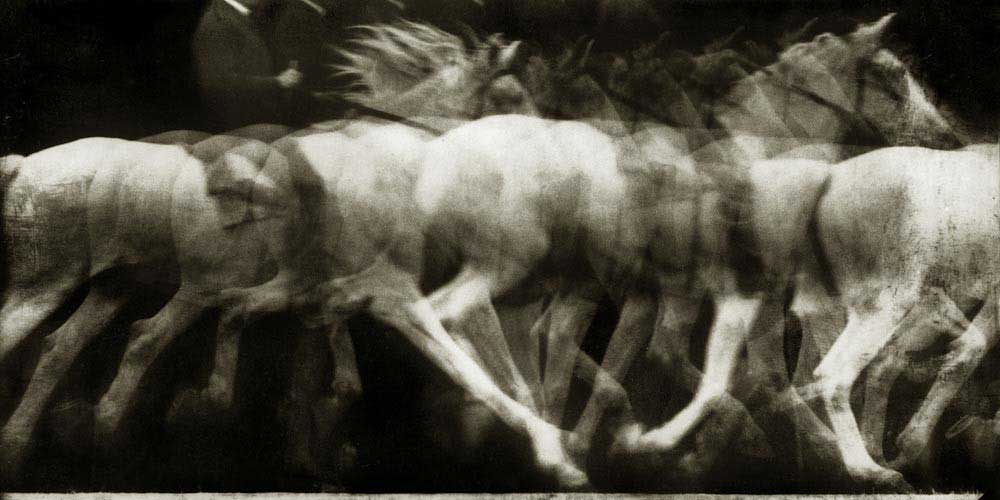
Étienne-Jules Marey, Cheval blanc monté, 1886

It was also believed that the descending nude came too close to the influences of Italian Futurism. Yet the Section d'Or Cubists tolerated and even enjoyed the presence of foreign artists (e.g., Constantin Brâncuși, František Kupka, Alexander Archipenko, Amedeo Modigliani and Joseph Csaky). During the month of February 1912, a large Futurist exhibition was held in Paris at the Galerie Bernheim-Jeune. Duchamp later denied the Futurist influence, claiming that the distance between Paris and Italy was too large for any tenable influences to occur.

In an interview with the museum curator Katherine Kuh, Marcel Duchamp spoke about his Nude Descending a Staircase and its relation to Futurism and the photographic motion studies of Muybridge and Marey:

In 1912 ... the idea of describing the movement of a nude coming downstairs while still retaining static visual means to do this, particularly interested me. The fact that I had seen chronophotographs of fencers in action and horse galloping (what we today call stroboscopic photography) gave me the idea for the Nude. It doesn't mean that I copied these photographs. The Futurists were also interested in somewhat the same idea, though I was never a Futurist. And of course the motion picture with its cinematic techniques was developing then too. The whole idea of movement, of speed, was in the air.

Duchamp later recalled of the relation between motion and his nude:

My aim was a static representation of movement, a static composition of indications of various positions taken by a form in movement—with no attempt to give cinema effects through painting. The reduction of a head in movement to a bare line seemed to me defensible.

And with regard to the petition by the hanging committee of the Indépendants:

I said nothing to my brothers. But I went immediately to the show and took my painting home in a taxi. It was really a turning point in my life, I can assure you. I saw that I would not be very much interested in groups after that.

Despite the controversy—whether it was seen as such at the time or not—the work was shown with its original title at the Salon de la Section d'Or, Galerie de la Boétie, October 1912, and with the same group of artists that exhibited at the Indépendants. His work also appeared in the illustrations to Du "Cubisme", and he participated in the La Maison Cubiste (Cubist House), organized by the designer André Mare for the Salon d'Automne of 1912 (a few months after the Indépendants). "The impression is", writes art historian Peter Brooke, "it was precisely because he wished to remain part of the group that he withdrew the painting; and that, far from being ill treated by the group, he was given a rather privileged position, probably through the patronage of Picabia".

It has been claimed (by others) that Duchamp never forgave his brothers and former colleagues for censoring his work.

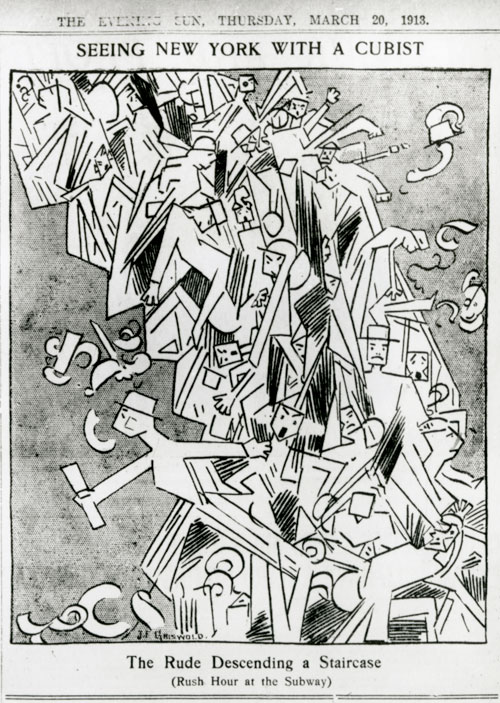
A 1913 parody, The Rude descending a staircase (Rush-Hour at the Subway), in The New York Evening Sun

Nude Descending a Staircase, No. 2 in the Frederic C. Torrey home, c. 1913

The painting was exhibited for the first time at Galeries Dalmau, Exposició d'Art Cubista, Barcelona, 1912. Duchamp subsequently submitted the painting to the 1913 Armory Show in New York City, where Americans, accustomed to naturalistic art, were scandalized. The painting, exhibited in the 'Cubist room', was submitted with the title Nu descendant un escalier, was listed in the catalogue (no. 241) with the French title. A postcard printed for the occasion showed the painting for the first time with the English translation Nude Descending a Staircase. Julian Street, an art critic for The New York Times wrote that the work resembled "an explosion in a shingle factory," and cartoonists satirized the piece. It spawned dozens of parodies in the years that followed. A work entitled Food Descending a Staircase was exhibited at a show parodying the most outrageous works at the Armory, running concurrently with the show at The Lighthouse School for the Blind. In American Art News, there were prizes offered to anyone who could find the nude.

After attending the Armory Show and seeing Marcel Duchamp's nude, President Theodore Roosevelt wrote: "Take the picture which for some reason is called 'A Naked Man Going Down Stairs'. There is in my bathroom a really good Navajo rug which, on any proper interpretation of the Cubist theory, is a far more satisfactory and decorative picture. Now, if, for some inscrutable reason, it suited somebody to call this rug a picture of, say, 'A Well-Dressed Man Going Up a Ladder', the name would fit the facts just about as well as in the case of the Cubist picture of the 'Naked Man Going Down Stairs'. From the standpoint of terminology each name would have whatever merit inheres in a rather cheap straining after effect; and from the standpoint of decorative value, of sincerity, and of artistic merit, the Navajo rug is infinitely ahead of the picture."

== Provenance ==
During the Armory Show the painting was bought by the San Francisco lawyer and art dealer Frederic C. Torrey, who hung it in his home in Berkeley. In 1919, after commissioning a full-size copy of the work, Torrey sold the original to Louise and Walter Conrad Arensberg. In 1954 it entered the collection of the Philadelphia Museum of Art as a bequest from the Arensbergs. There it is displayed as part of the permanent collection alongside preliminary studies and a later copy by Duchamp.

== Homage ==
- The stroboscopic photograph A Nude Descends a Staircase by Gjon Mili (1942).
- The painting Ema by Gerhard Richter.
- The 1937 drawing Femme nue montant l'escalier by Joan Miró conserved at his foundation in Barcelona.
- MASTER RACE by Bernie Krigstein (& Al Feldstein) in: Impact #1, EC Comics, USA, April 1955. Art Spiegelman highlights Krigstein's taking influence from Nude Descending a Staircase No.2 when portraying the motion of a character falling as a watershed moment in the progression of comic book art and the way comic books approached the Holocaust.
- The cover and title of Dude Descending a Staircase (2003), a music album by Apollo 440.
- The same-titled instrumental on Bruce Cockburn's music album Life Short Call Now (2006).
- The play Interrogating the Nude by Doug Wright
- The play Artist Descending a Staircase by Tom Stoppard.
- The poem Nude Descending a Staircase by X. J. Kennedy.
- The painting Nude Duck Descending a Staircase by Chuck Jones.
- The Dudley Do-Right cartoon Stolen Art Masterpiece features a painting title Newt Descending a Staircase.
- The song "Naked Girl Falling down the Stairs" by the Cramps.
- In the 1933 screwball comedy Three-Cornered Moon, when a struggling artist dating Claudette Colbert is evicted, his landlord slides a Duchamp-esque painting down the front stairs of the building.
- In the poem "Journey: The North Coast" by Australian poet Robert Gray, the line "Down these slopes move, as a nude descends a staircase,/ slender white gum trees" is an allusion to this artwork.
- Live action adaption in the music video "Totally Nude" by The Wallets, 1986.
- A same-titled choral work for men's voices composed in 1980 by Allen Shearer and recorded by Chanticleer on their album, Out of This World (1994).
- Stephanie Caloia nude descending a staircase, 1981, a photograph by Patricia Monaco.
- A Calvin and Hobbes strip in which Calvin reenacts the painting, first published 3 November 1993.
- A virtual reality art piece called "Duchampiana" by Lilian Hess.
- A 3D rendering of the character "The Infomaniac" re-enacting this painting during the credits sequence of the PC Game "LEGO Island", developed by Mindscape (1997)
- Yuki Kihara's photographic work "Maui Descending A Staircase I (After Duchamp)" and video work "Maui Descending A Staircase II (After Duchamp)" in her series "A Samoan Savage"
- The album Nude descending staircase headless by Teen Suicide.

== See also ==
- List of works by Marcel Duchamp
- Readymades of Marcel Duchamp
- Naked woman climbing a staircase, 1937 by Joan Miró
- Chronophotography

== Notes and references ==
Notes

References

- Tomkins, Calvin (1996). Duchamp: A Biography. U.S.: Henry Holt and Company, Inc. ISBN 0-8050-5789-7.
- Uli Schuster. "Marcel Duchamp: Nu descendant un escalier - Image Analysis". Archived from the original on April 25, 2009.
- Roosevelt, Theodoore (1913). History as literature, by Theodore Roosevelt. U.S.: New York: Charles Scribner's sons. ISBN 1-58734-046-1.
