= Miami Platja =

Human settlement in Mont-roig del Camp, Spain

Coordinates: 41.089°N 0.961°E

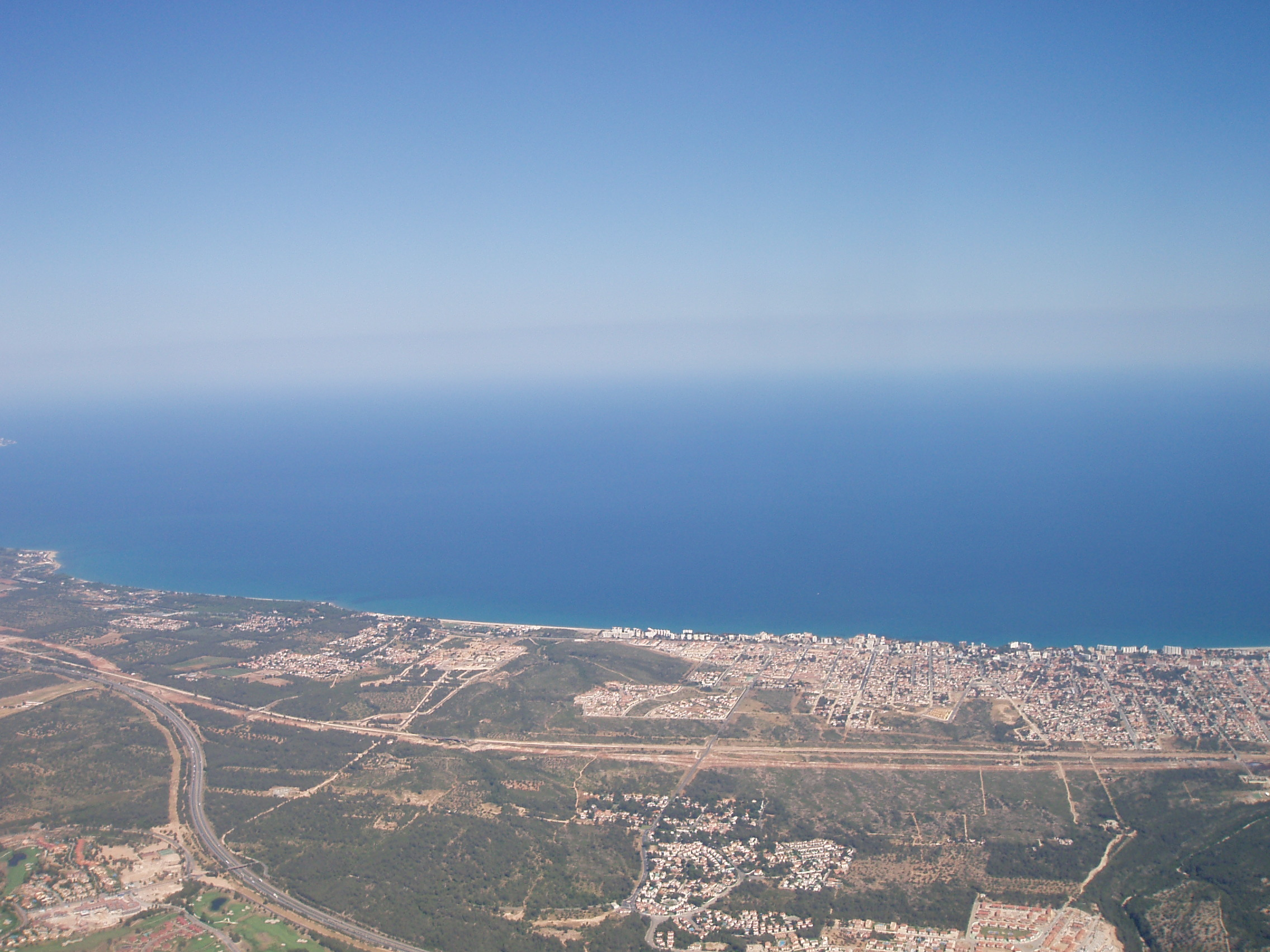
Most of Miami Platja is at right, on the Mediterranean coast. The two main roads are the A-7 (Autovia del Mediterrani) across centre, and the AP-7/E15 (Autopista del Mediterrani) at lower left.

Miami Platja (Catalan pronunciation: [miˈami ˈpladʒə]; literally "Miami Beach") is a coastal resort about 30 km south of Tarragona, in southern Catalonia, Spain.

It forms part of the municipality of Mont-roig del Camp, some 20 kilometres (12 mi) away, although it is contiguous with the municipality of Vandellòs i l'Hospitalet de l'Infant, just the other side of the river Llastres. It consists mainly of holiday apartments and villas, with a few hotels. A large area between the coast road and railway and the two motorways further inland is filled with holiday homes built in rows along wide streets.
