= Man and Woman in Front of a Pile of Excrement =

1935 painting by Joan Miró

- Artist: Joan Miró
- Year: 1935
- Medium: Oil on copper
- Dimensions: 23 cm × 32 cm (9.1 in × 13 in)
- Location: Fundació Joan Miró; Barcelona

Man and Woman in Front of a Pile of Excrement (Homme et femme devant un tas d'excréments) is a 1935 oil painting on copper by Joan Miró. It is held at the Fundació Joan Miró, in Barcelona.

== Description ==
The painting was made on a piece of copper in the week between 15 and 22 October 1935. Miró said that the subject resulted from trying to represent the tragedy and torture of the Spanish Civil War. The painting was one of twelve known as the Wild Paintings. Half of these were painted on copper whilst the remaining six were on the type of hardboard called Masonite. These were constructed in the period of public rioting in Spain that resulted in the Civil War. Miró said this painting was about a period of unease. The painting shows a man and woman reaching out for an embrace but neither of them are moving. The enlarged genitals and lurid colouring have been described as full of "disgust and a loathsome sexuality". The figures represented Miró's pessimism with the situation in Catalonia. This painting has been described as the "key painting" representing Miró's foreboding about the forthcoming civil war. A chiaroscuro effect is created by the black sky against which the disjointed limbs of the figures are highlighted.

Miró's choice of title was to use French and not Spanish. Miró said that the reference to excrement comes from a saying by Rembrandt who said that when it came to painting, rubies and diamonds were found in dung heaps.

== Provenance ==
This picture was painted in Mont-roig del Camp in 1935 and was in the possession of Pilar Juncosa Miró, but is now in the permanent collection of the Fundació Joan Miró in Barcelona. Pilar Juncosa had been Miró's wife since 1929 and she was a supporter of his Foundation. This painting is kept in the Pilar Juncosa Gallery at his Foundation.
