= Josep Royo =

Catalan artist

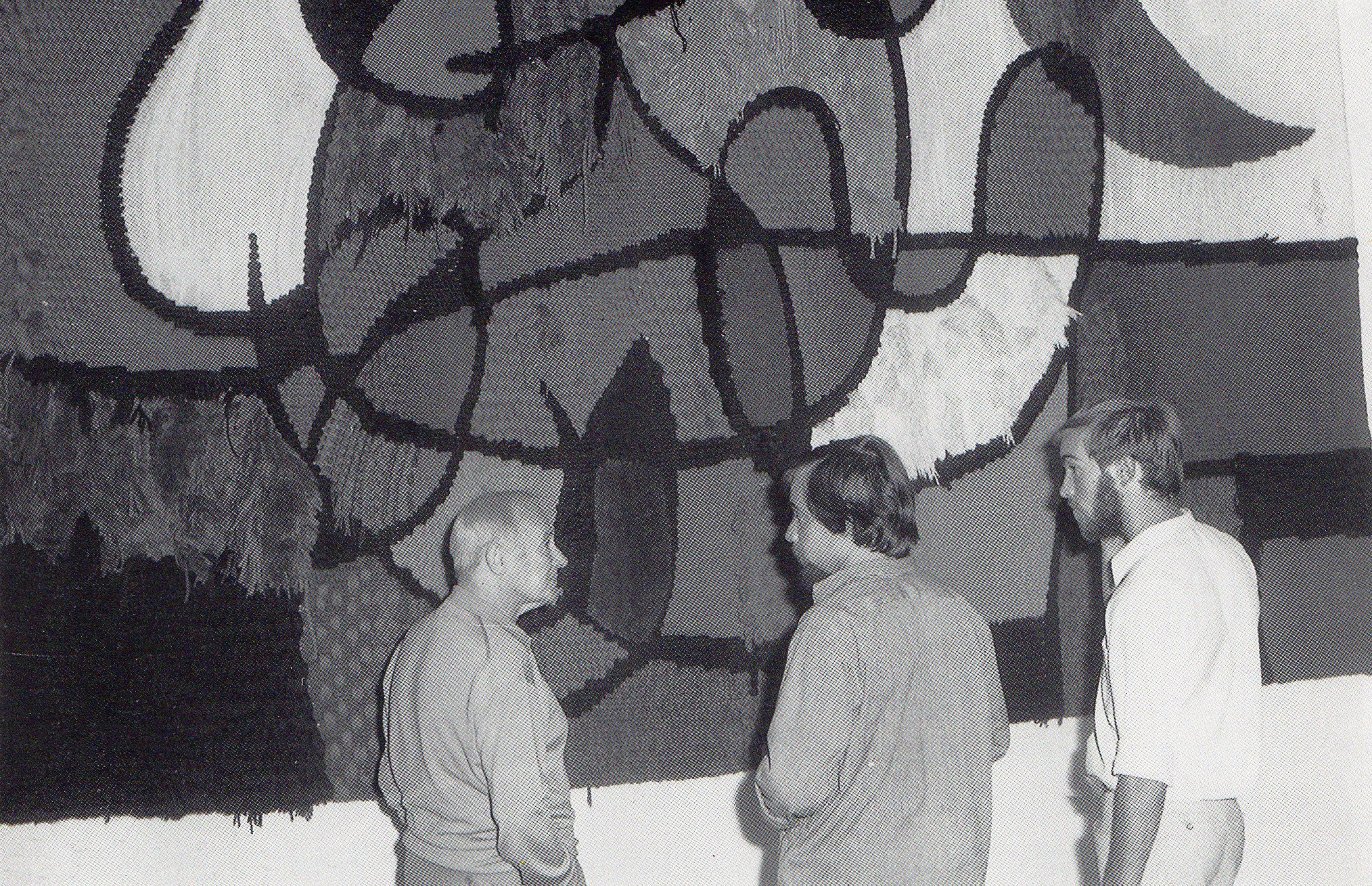
Royo (center) with artists Joan Miró (left) and Carles Delclaux (right) looking at the first version of the Tarragona Tapestry

Josep Royo (born 1945 in Barcelona) is a Catalan contemporary artist best known for his tapestries.

With fellow Catalan artist Joan Miró, he created The World Trade Center Tapestry, which hung in the lobby of the South World Trade Center from 1974 until the building was destroyed in 2001. He also collaborated with Miró to create a tapestry for the new headquarters of CaixaBank in Barcelona. An image from this tapestry would become the current logo for CaixaBank.

His work is exhibited in locations around the world including the Museu D'Art Modern De Tarragona in Catalonia, the Tamayo Museum in Mexico City, and The National Gallery of Art in Washington, D.C.

== Awards ==
1986- Aranjuez tapestry award
