= Yatarō =

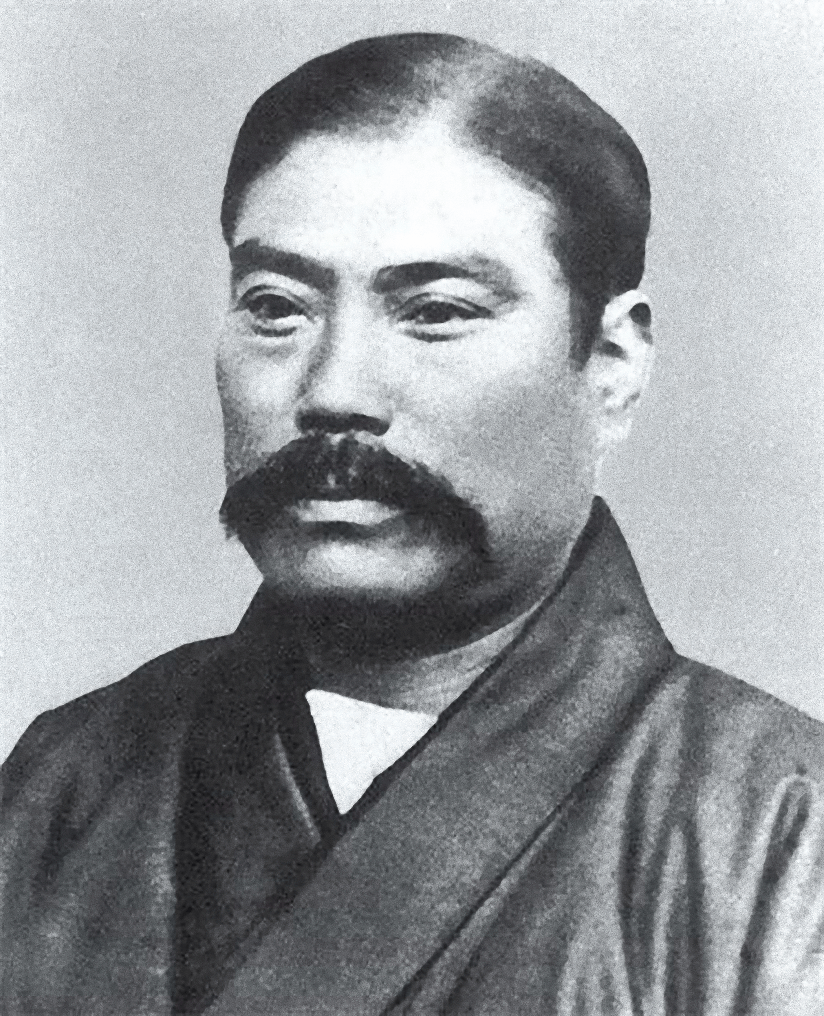
- Yataro Iwasaki (1835–1885), Japanese businessman, founder of Mitsubishi financial combine
- Pronunciation: jataɾoɯ (IPA)
- Gender: Male

Origin
- Origin: Japanese
- Meaning: Different meanings depending on the kanji used

Other names
- Alternative spelling: Yataro (Kunrei-shiki) Yataro (Nihon-shiki) Yatarō, Yataro, Yatarou (Hepburn)

Yatarō, Yataro or Yatarou is a masculine Japanese given name.

== Written forms ==
Yatarō can be written using different combinations of kanji characters. Here are some examples:

The characters used for "taro" (太郎) literally means "thick (big) son" and usually used as a suffix to a masculine name, especially for the first son. The "ya" part of the name can use a variety of characters, each of which will change the meaning of the name ("矢" for arrow, "野" for field, "弥" and so on).

- 矢太郎, "arrow, big son"
- 野太郎, "field, big son"
- 弥太郎, "more and more, big son"
- 彌太郎, "more and more, big son"
- 八太郎, "eight, big son"
- 夜太郎, "night, big son"

Other combinations...

- 矢太朗, "arrow, thick, bright"
- 矢多朗, "arrow, many, bright"
- 勇汰朗, "bravery, excessive, bright"
- 野太朗, "field, thick, bright"
- 弥太朗, more and more, thick, bright"

The name can also be written in hiragana やたろう or katakana ヤタロウ.

== Notable people with the given name Yatarō ==
- Yataro Iwasaki (岩崎 弥太郎; 1835–1885), Japanese businessman
- Yataro Kojima (小島 弥太郎; 1522–1582), Japanese samurai
- Yataro Kurokawa (黒川 弥太郎; 1910–1984), Japanese actor
- Yataro Mishima (三島 彌太郎; 1867–1919), Japanese businessman and banker
- Yataro Tsuda (津田 弥太郎; born 1952), Japanese politician
