= Joaquim Gomis =

Joaquim Gomis Serdañons (1902 in Barcelona – 1991) was a Catalan photographer, collector, entrepreneur, and promoter of the arts.

Gomis was born in Barcelona on 19 September 1902 to a wealthy family. His father owned a business in the cotton trade and his grandfather Cels Gomis (Reus, 1842 - Barcelona, 1915) was a civil engineer with intellectual interests. At the age of twelve, Gomis acquired his first camera−a Brownie−which he used to take his first photographs. In 1919 he received his degree in accounting, and beginning in 1921 he lived in England and the United States. These periods abroad enabled Gomis to produce photo series based on the architecture and urban landscapes of the places he visited. In 1929 he married Odette Cherbonnier in Paris.

Joaquim Gomis was well-respected in artistic circles, which were somewhat taken aback when he began photographing the work of Gaudí, an architect who was underrated at the time. In 1930 Gomis became a founding member and the first president of the Amics de l'art nou (Friends of New Art) association and was also a founding member of Club 49 in 1949. During the Spanish Civil War, Gomis lived in Paris and traveled in Europe. In 1939, at the end of the war, he returned to Barcelona.

In 1940, in collaboration with Joan Prats, Gomis published his fotoscops, a series of books with images in sequential order. Although his first series was about a eucalyptus, some of the subjects he covered were Gaudí's Sagrada Familia church, the Cathedral of Tarragona, the works of Joan Miró, and the city of Barcelona.

His photographic production can be associated with the Neues Sehen movement and is considered one of the exceptions within a context dominated by pictorialism. In 1952 he was named president of the Amics de Gaudí (Friends of Gaudí) group, and from 1972 to 1975 he presided over the Fundació Joan Miró. Exhibitions of Joaquim Gomis' work include a show held at the IVAM in Valencia in 1997, with previously unpublished images from the period he spent in the United States from 1922 to 1923. Some of his works are held in the Museu Nacional d'Art de Catalunya.
