= Joan Prats =

Catalan art promoter (1891–1970)

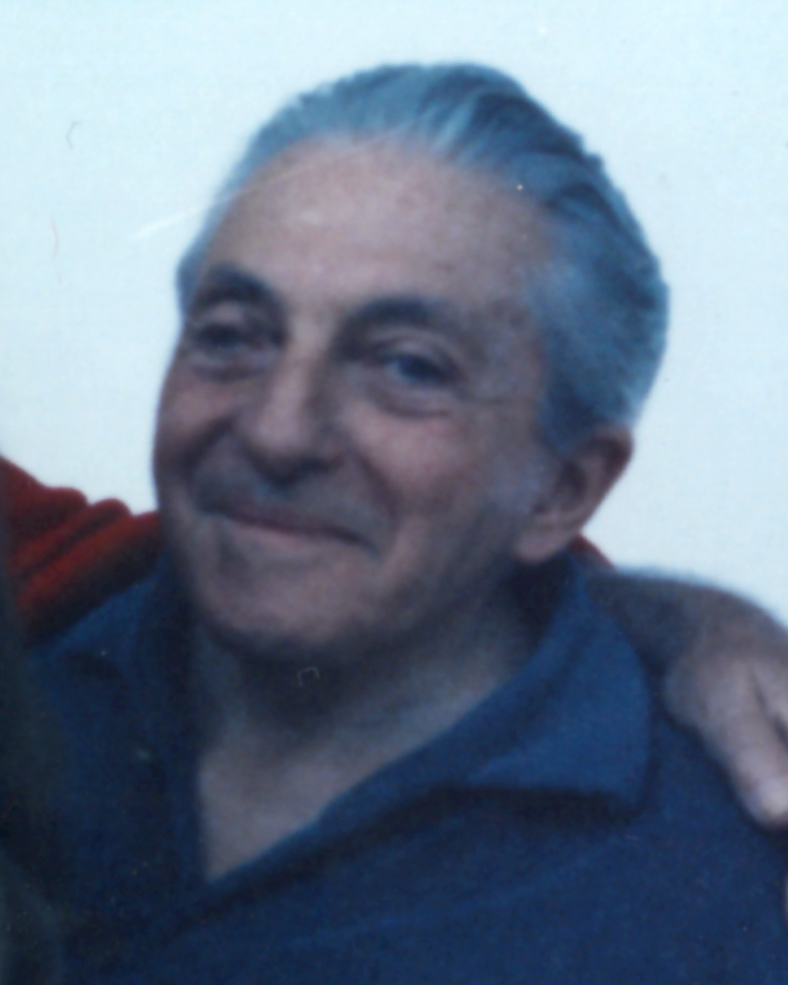
- Born: 19 November 1891; Barcelona
- Died: 14 October 1970 (aged 78); Barcelona
- Occupation: Art promoter
- Known for: Art promoter, friend of Joan Miró

Joan Prats (Barcelona, 1891 – Barcelona, 1970) was a Catalan art promoter and a close friend of Joan Miró.

== Life ==
Joan Prats was born in 1891 to a family that sold hats. He was trained as an artist in the Llotja School, where he first met Joan Miró, who was also training there.

Prats organised exhibitions for leading Iberian artists including Salvador Dalí, Pablo Picasso, Alexander Calder and his good friend Miró. He was also associated with Paul Klee, Max Ernst, Josep Vicenç Foix and Joan Brossa.

Prats, together with rationalist architect Josep Lluis Sert and avant-garde photographer Joaquim Gomis, founded the ADLAN (Amics de l'Art Nou, i.e. Friends of New Art) association, which brought together a variety of different people interested in new trends in the arts. The association lasted from 1932 to 1936 and the beginning of the Spanish Civil War.

Miró formed his foundation with Prats, which eventually led to the museum / exhibit hall in Barcelona known as Fundació Joan Miró. Prats admired Miró's ability to make things from found objects like those in The Caress of a Bird. Prats said: "When I take a stone, it is just a stone. When I grab a stone, it is a Miró."

== Sources ==
- AA.DD.. The golden book of Catalan art. Ediciones Primera Plana, Barcelona, 1997.
- Clavero, J. George. Foundation. Guide to the Foundation. Barcelona: Ediciones Polígrafa, 2010. DL B.10.061.2010. ISBN 978-84-343-1242-5 .
