= Mont-roig del Camp =

- Municipality
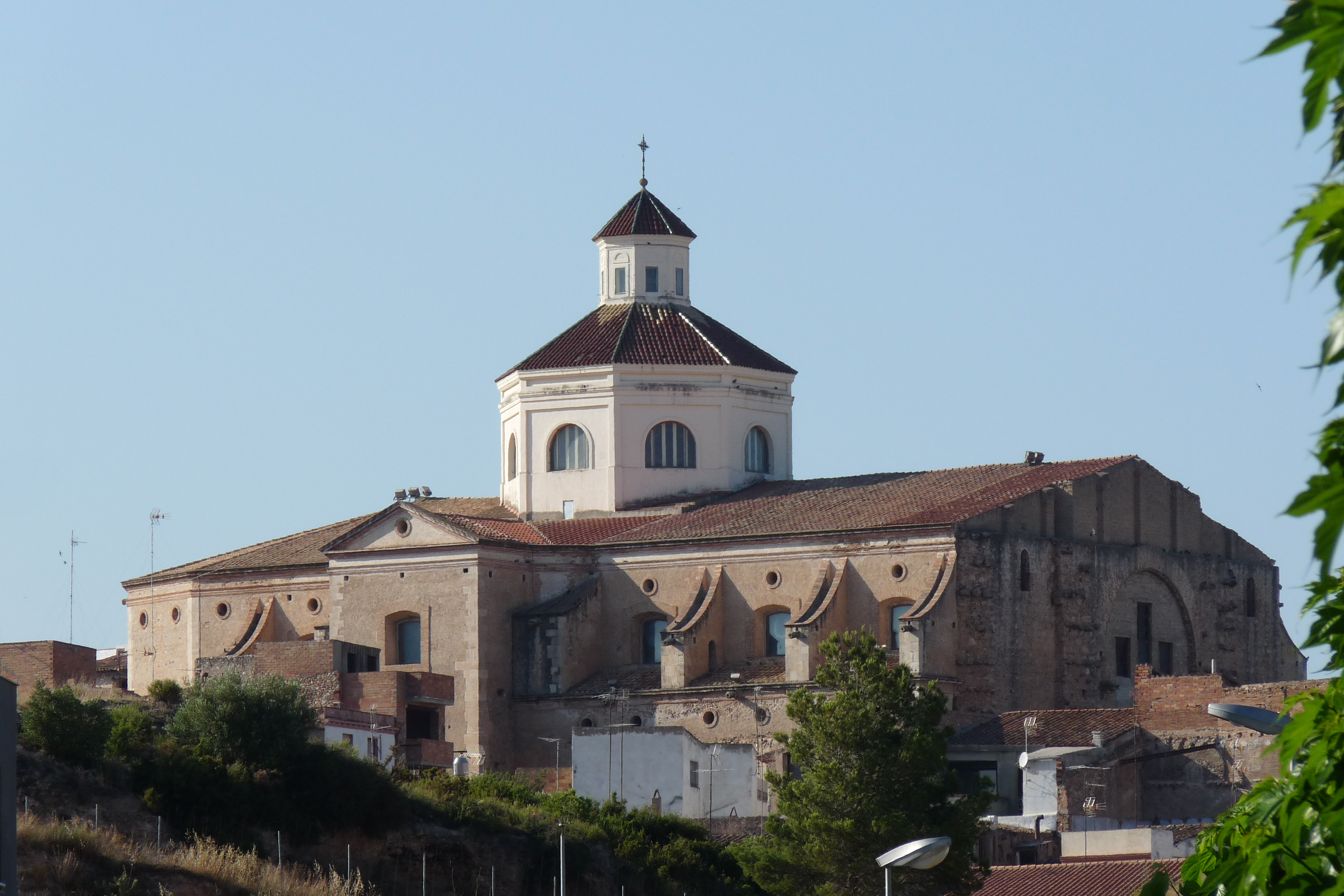
- The church of Sant Miquel de Mont-roig

- Flag Coat of arms

- Location in Catalonia
- Coordinates: 41°5′21″N 0°57′38″E
- Country: Spain
- Community: Catalonia
- Province: Tarragona
- Comarca: Baix Camp

Government
  - Mayor: Francisco Morancho López (2015)

Area
  - Total: 63.3 km^{2} (24.4 sq mi)

Population (2025-01-01)
  - Total: 14,615
  - Density: 231/km^{2} (598/sq mi)
- Website: mont-roig.cat

Mont-roig del Camp (Catalan pronunciation: [munˈrɔdʒ ðəl ˈkam]) is a town and municipality in the comarca of Baix Camp in Catalonia. It is in the middle of its comarca, between the Serra de Colldejou and the Mediterranean Sea. It includes two populated places: the historic town of Mont-roig del Camp in the interior, whose economy revolves round the cultivation of nuts and olives, and the beach resort of Miami Platja on the coast, the Costa Daurada. Overall it has a population of 14,615 (register office, 2025).

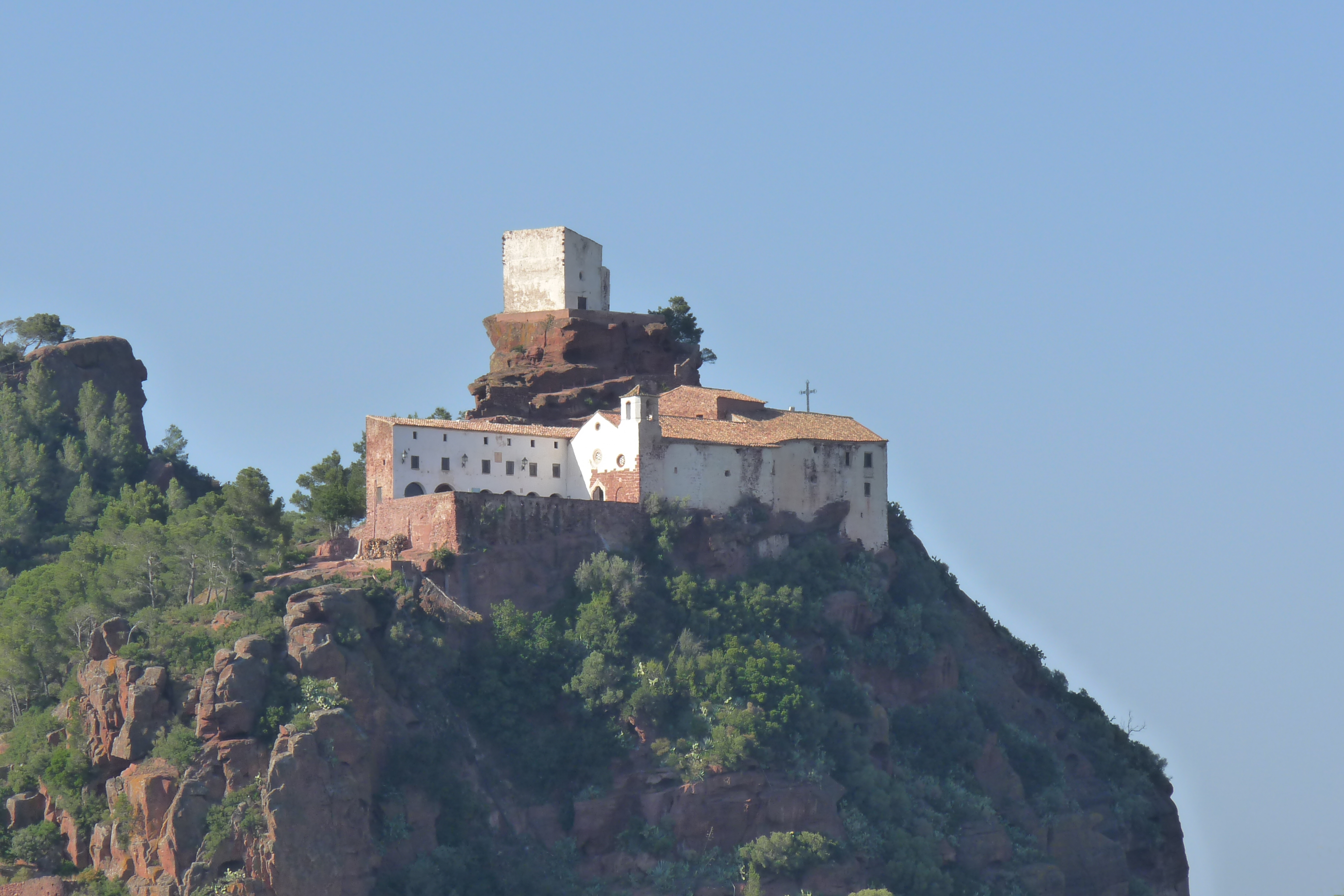
The sanctuary of Our Lady of the Rock with the chapel of Sant Ramon above

The municipality has a long coastline, with campsites and a few hotels, informally distributed over the districts of Pins de Miramar and Miami Platja, as well as round the Platja de Rifà (Rifà beach), close to the district of Les Pobles.

Notable buildings include the "new" parish church, that of Sant Miquel, built in Gothic and Renaissance style between 1574 and 1610.

High above the town on a very eroded outcrop of rock stands the sanctuary of Our Lady of the Rock with the Sant Ramon chapel. The painter Joan Miró spent long periods at the family property of Mas d'en Miró, in the Les Pobles district, from 1911 onwards. It was a frequent subject in his early paintings, such as The Farm (1920–21) and The Tilled Field (1923–24).
