= Fundació Joan Miró =

Modern art museum in Barcelona, Spain

Coordinates: 41°22′07″N 2°09′36″E

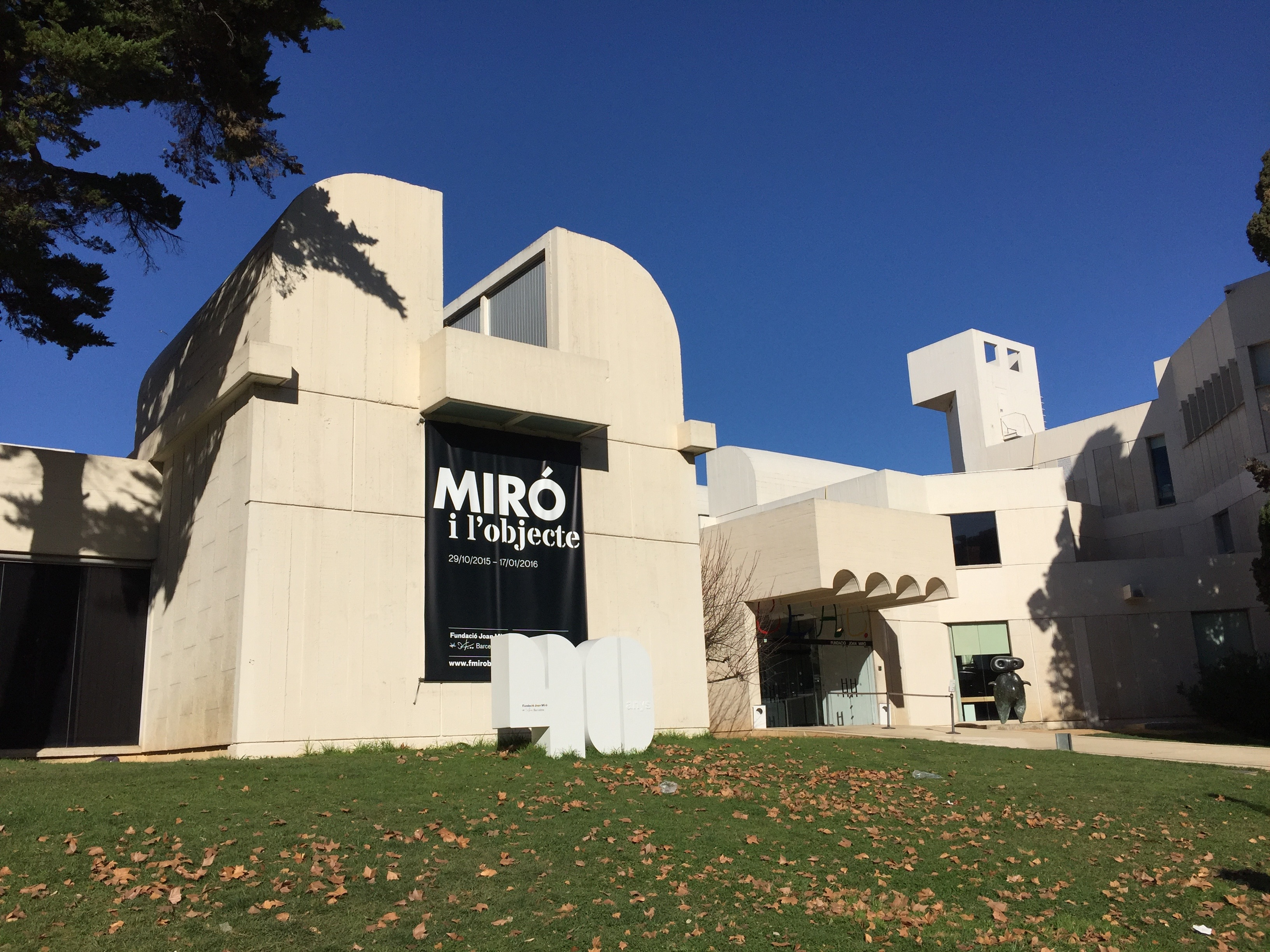
- Established: 1975
- Location: Montjuïc in Barcelona
- Director: Marko Daniel
- Public transit access: Parc de Montjuïc
- Website: www.fmirobcn.org

The Fundació Joan Miró (Catalan: Fundació Joan Miró, Centre d'Estudis d'Art Contemporani [fundəsiˈo ʒuˈam miˈɾo]; English: Joan Miró Foundation, Centre of Studies of Contemporary Art) is a modern art museum honoring the life and work of the Spanish artist Joan Miró, located on the hill called Montjuïc in Barcelona, Catalonia (Spain).

== History ==
The idea for the foundation was made in 1968 by Joan Miró. Miró formed the foundation with his friend Joan Prats. Miró wanted to create a new building that would encourage particularly younger artists to experiment with contemporary art. The building was designed by Josep Lluís Sert to ensure that this work could also be made available to the public and exhibited. He designed the building with courtyards and terraces and to create a natural path for visitors to move through the building.

Building began on the mountain of Montjuïc and the foundation opened on 10 June 1975. Not only was the architect a close friend of Miró but so was the first president Joaquim Gomis and Miró was amongst the first board. It was claimed that the new foundation represented a new way of viewing the concept of a museum and how the people of Barcelona could relate to their cultural heritage.

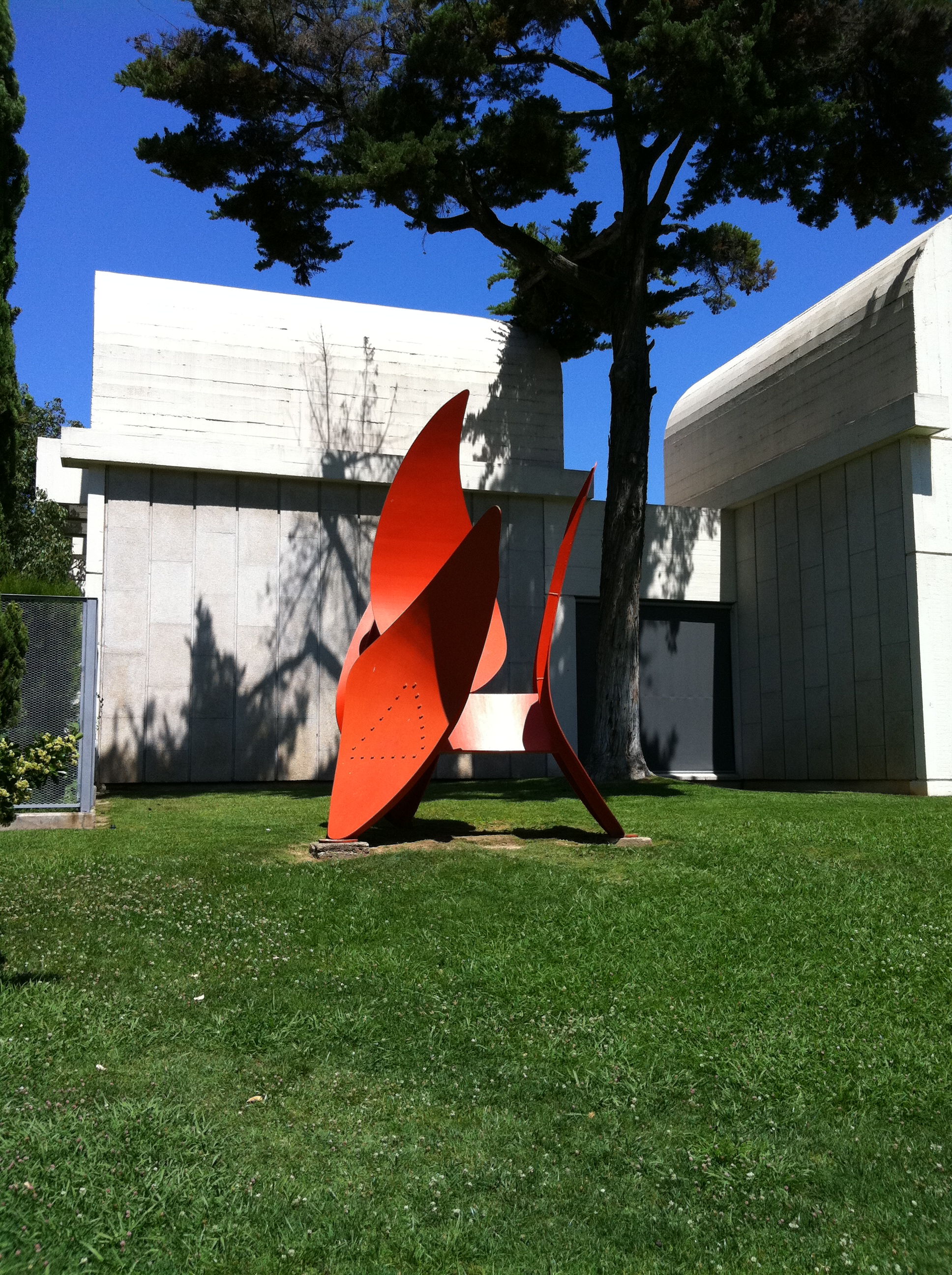
4 Wings by Alexander Calder in the garden

Expansion in 1986 to the building added an auditorium and a library which holds some of the 10,000 items in the Foundation and Miró's collection.

== Works by Joan Miró ==
Many of the works in the building were donated by the artist himself. Highlights include:

- The wing of the lark ..., 1967
- Hermitage of San Juan Huerta, 1917
- Street Pedralbes, 1917
- Portrait of a boy, 1919
- Painting (the white gloves), 1925
- Flame in space and Naked woman, 1932
- Character, 1934
- Man and Woman in Front of a Pile of Excrement, 1935
- Naked Woman Climbing a Staircase, 1937
- No, 1937
- The Morning Star, 1940
- Barcelona Series, 1944
- The Diamond smiles at twilight, 1947–1948
- The Caress of a Bird, 1967
- The gold of the azure, 1967
- Painting on white to a solitary cell I, II, III, 1968
- Figure in front of the sun, 1968
- Catalan peasant by moonlight, 1968
- Miró's Chicago, 1968
- Character, 1970, May 1968, 1968–1973
- Tapestry of the Fundació, 1979

== Collection ==
In line with Miró's original idea the Foundation has a space named "Espai 13" which is dedicated to promoting the work of young experimental artists. Many curators have been in charge of that program, including Frederic Montornes, Monica Regàs, and Ferran Barenblit, who was later Director of MACBA. Although there is also work by Peter Greenaway, Chillida, René Magritte, Rothko, Tàpies and Saura.

The collection includes Alexander Calder's 4 Wings and Mercury Fountain. The Mercury Fountain uses the liquid metal mercury to create a fountain. As mercury is poisonous, the fountain is kept behind glass to protect the visitors.

The museum uses QRpedia to allow visitors to read Wikipedia articles about objects in the collection, translated into their preferred language.

== Joan Miró Prize ==
Since 2007, the Fundació Joan Miró – initially with support from Fundació Caixa Girona, later Stavros Niarchos Foundation – have been jointly bestowing the Joan Miró Prize with a total volume of 70,000 euros to a contemporary artist every other year. Previous recipients have included:

- 2007: Olafur Eliasson
- 2009: Pipilotti Rist
- 2011: Mona Hatoum
- 2013: Roni Horn
- 2015: Ignasi Aballí
- 2017: Kader Attia
- 2019: Nalini Malani
- 2023: Tuan Andrew Nguyen

== See also ==
- List of museums in Barcelona
- List of single-artist museums
- Joan Miró: The Ladder of Escape
- Fundació Pilar i Joan Miró in Mallorca
