= The Garden of Earthly Delights =

Triptych painting by Hieronymus Bosch

Hieronymus Bosch, The Garden of Earthly Delights, oil on oak panels, 205.5 cm × 384.9 cm (81 in × 152 in), Museo del Prado, Madrid

The Garden of Earthly Delights (Dutch: De tuin der lusten, lit. 'The garden of lusts') is the modern title (Note: At the time, paintings often had no fixed titles. It is listed in Philip IV of Spain's inventory as La Pintura del Madroño. It is known today in Spanish, at the Prado Museum, as El Jardín de las Delicias.) given to a five-panel triptych (three oil-painted panels when open, two oak panels when closed) painted by the Early Netherlandish master Hieronymus Bosch, painted between 1490 and 1510, when Bosch was between 40 and 60 years old. Because of Bosch's religious beliefs, interpretations of the work typically assume it is a warning against the perils of temptation. The outer panels place the work on the Third Day of Creation. The intricacy of its symbolism, particularly that of the central panel, has led to a wide range of scholarly interpretations over the centuries.

Twentieth-century art historians are divided as to whether the triptych's central panel is a moral warning or a panorama of the paradise lost. He painted three large triptychs (the others are The Last Judgment of c. 1482 and The Haywain Triptych of c. 1516) that can be read from left to right and in which each panel was essential to the meaning of the whole. Each of these three works presents distinct yet linked themes addressing history and faith. Triptychs from this period were generally intended to be read sequentially, the left and right panels often portraying Eden and the Last Judgment respectively, while the main subject was contained in the centerpiece.

It is not known whether The Garden was intended as an altarpiece, but the general view is that the extreme subject matter of the inner center and right panels make it unlikely that it was planned for a church or monastery. It has been housed in the Museo del Prado in Madrid, Spain since 1939.

== Description ==
=== Exterior ===
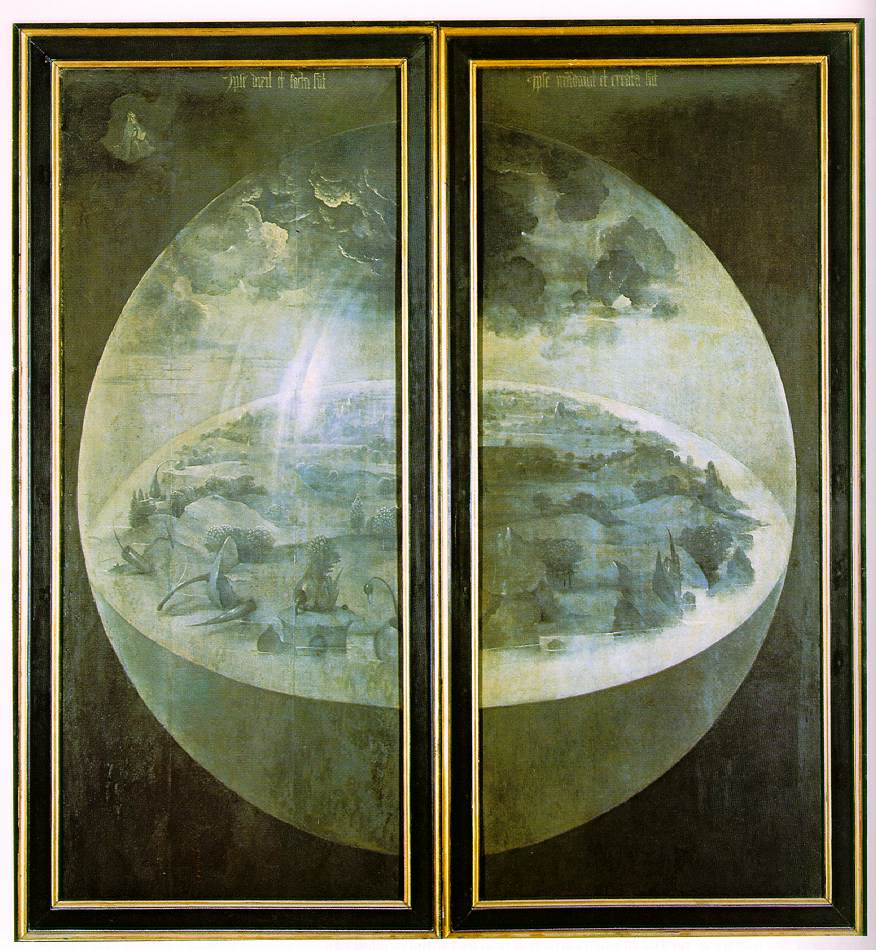
The exterior panels show the world during creation, probably on the Third Day, after the addition of plant life but before the appearance of animals and humans.

When the triptych's wings are closed, the design of the outer panels becomes visible. Rendered in a green–gray grisaille, these panels lack colour, probably because most Netherlandish triptychs were thus painted, but possibly indicating that the painting reflects a time before the creation of the sun and moon, which were formed, according to Christian theology, to "give light to the earth". The typical grisaille blandness of Netherlandish altarpieces served to highlight the splendid color inside.

The outer panels are generally thought to depict the creation of the world, showing greenery beginning to clothe the still-pristine Earth. God, wearing a crown similar to a papal tiara (a common convention in Netherlandish painting), is visible as a tiny figure at the upper left. Bosch shows God as the father sitting with a Bible on his lap, creating the Earth in a passive manner by divine fiat. Above him is inscribed a quote from Psalm 33:9 reading "Ipse dīxit, et facta sunt: ipse mandāvit, et creāta sunt"—For he spoke and it was done; he commanded, and it stood fast. There is a firmament around the Earth, in reference to Genesis 1:7. It hangs suspended in the cosmos, which is shown as an impermeable darkness, whose only other inhabitant is God himself.

Despite the presence of vegetation, the earth does not yet contain human or animal life, indicating that the scene represents the events of the biblical Third Day. Bosch renders the plant life in an unusual fashion, using uniformly gray tints, which make it difficult to determine whether the subjects are purely vegetal or perhaps include some mineral formations. Surrounding the interior of the globe is the sea, partially illuminated by beams of light shining through clouds. The exterior wings have a clear position within the sequential narrative of the work as a whole. They show an unpopulated earth composed solely of rock and plants, contrasting sharply with the inner central panel, which contains an Earth teeming with lustful humanity.

=== Interior ===
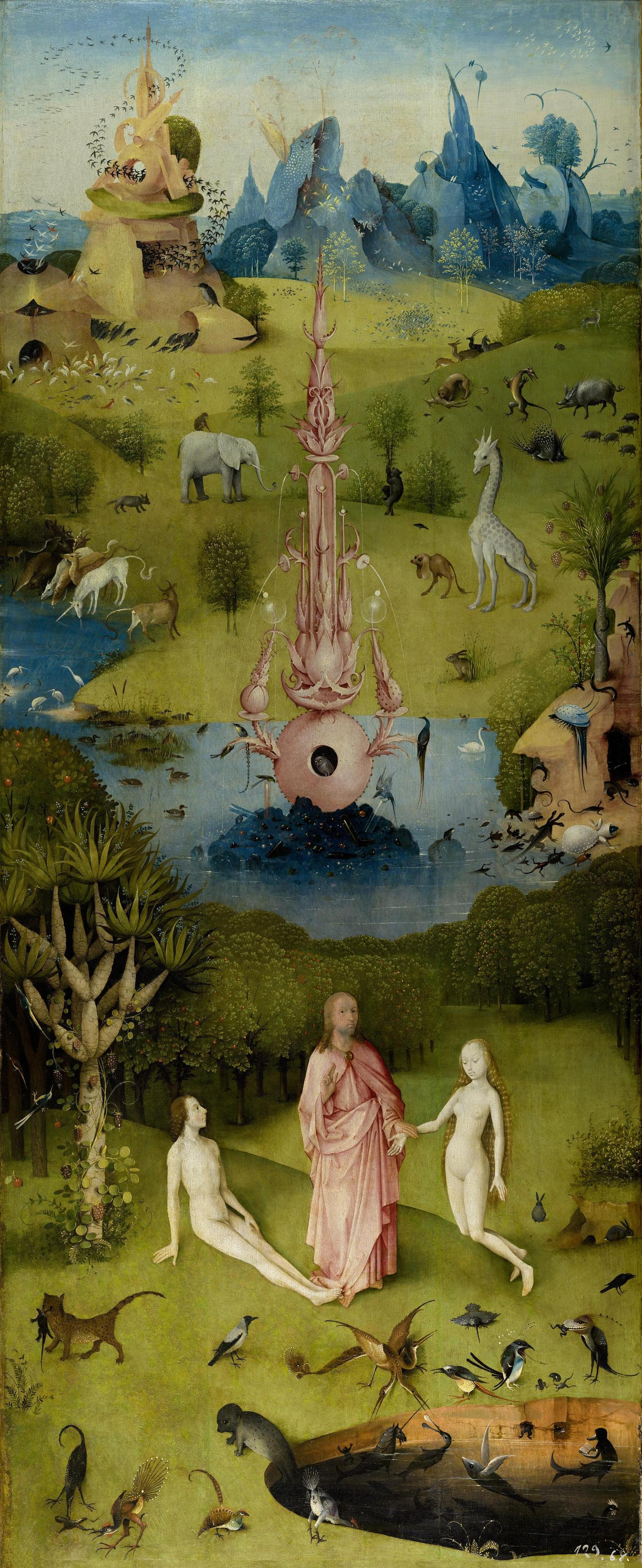
Left panel: The Garden of Eden

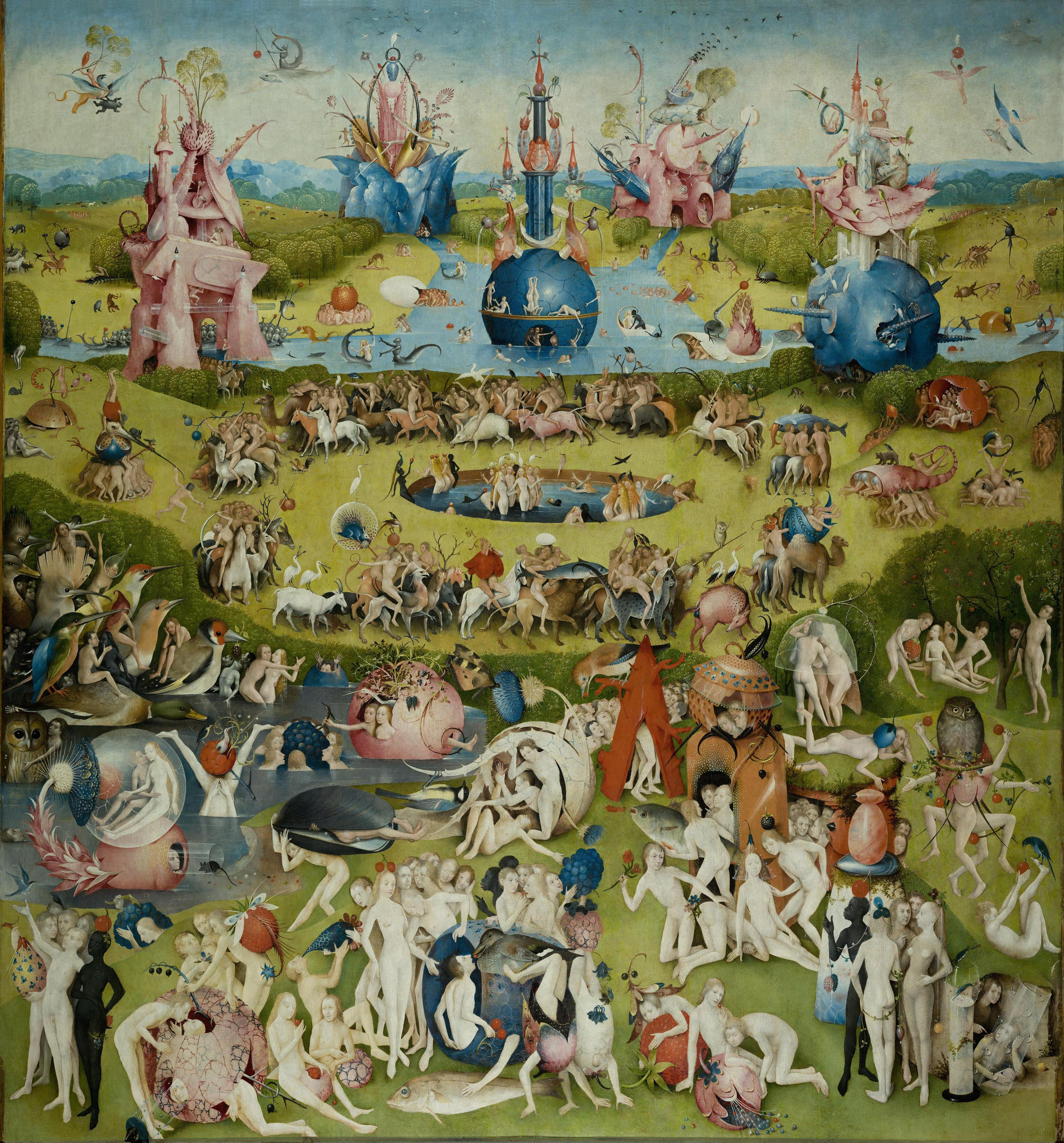
Center panel: The Garden of Earthly Delights

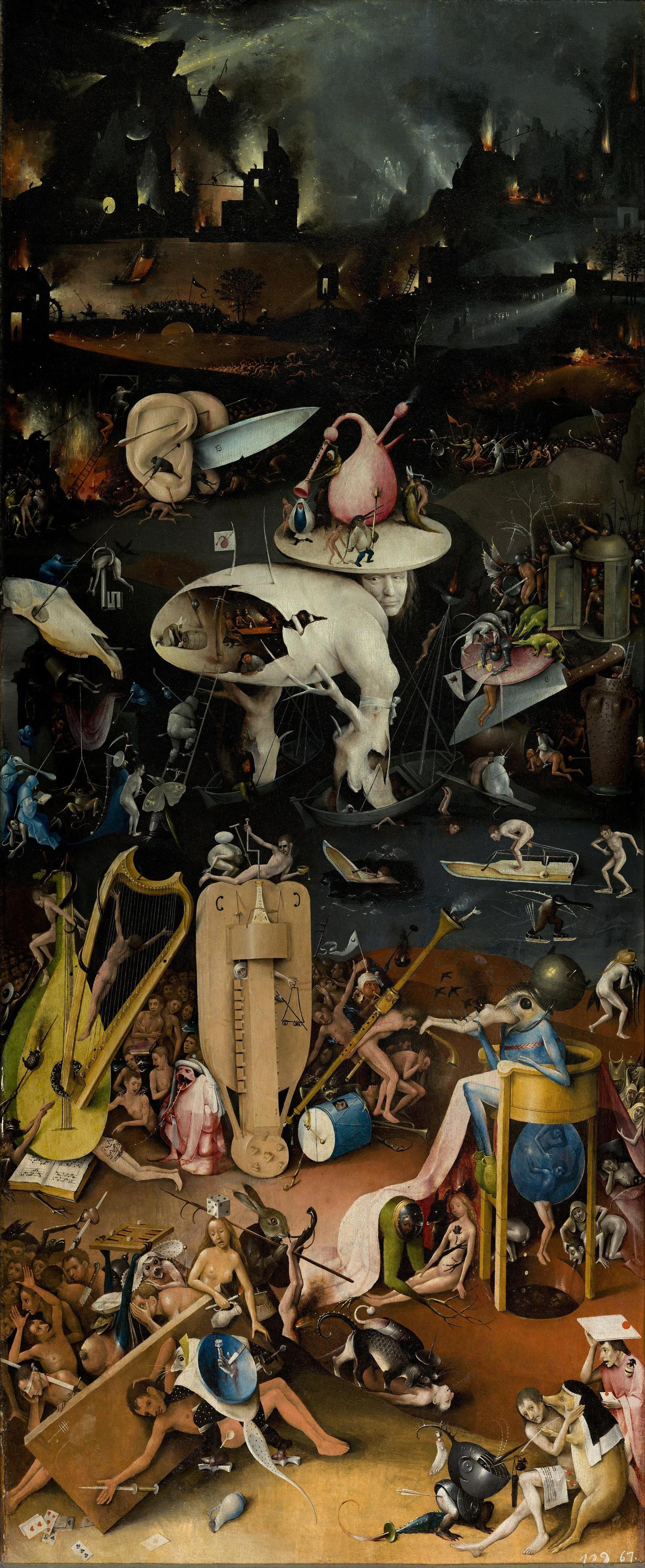
Right panel: The hell

Bosch may have intended the outer panels to establish a Biblical setting for the inner elements of the work, and the exterior image is generally interpreted as set in an earlier time than those in the interior. As with Bosch's Haywain Triptych, the inner centerpiece is flanked by heavenly and hellish imagery. The scenes depicted in the triptych are thought to follow a chronological order: flowing from left to right, they represent Eden, the garden of earthly delights, and Hell. God appears as the creator of humanity in the left-hand wing, while the consequences of humanity's failure to follow his will are shown in the right.

In contrast to Bosch's two other extant triptychs, The Last Judgment (around 1482) and The Haywain (after 1510), God is absent from the central panel. Instead, this panel shows humanity acting with apparent free will as naked men and women engage in various pleasure-seeking activities. According to some interpretations, the right-hand panel is believed to show God's penalties in a hellscape.

Art historian Charles de Tolnay believed that, through the seductive gaze of Adam, the left panel already shows God's waning influence upon the newly created earth. This view is reinforced by the rendering of God in the outer panels as a tiny figure in comparison to the immensity of the earth. According to Hans Belting, the three inner panels seek to broadly convey the Old Testament notion that, before the Fall, there was no defined boundary between good and evil; humanity in its innocence was unaware of consequence.

==== Left panel ====
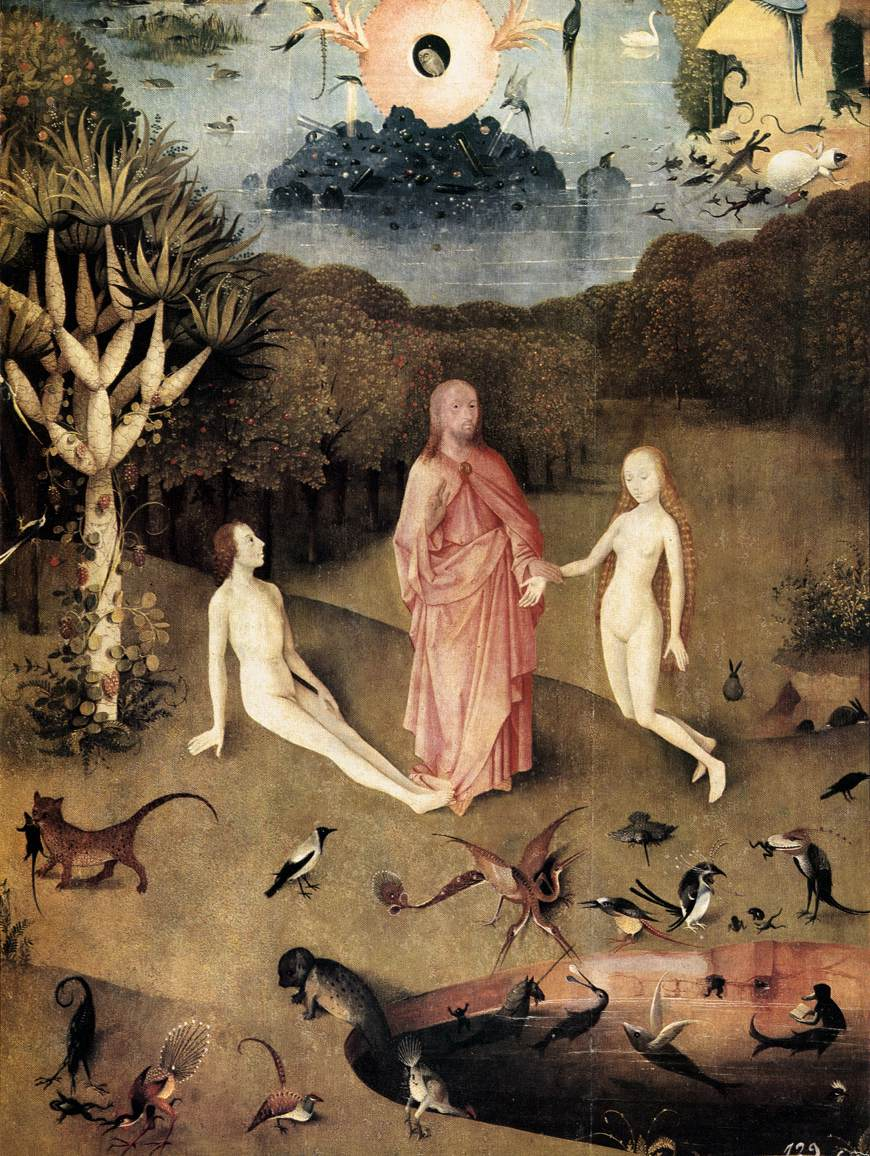
Detail from the left hand panel, showing the pre-incarnate Christ blessing Eve before she is presented to Adam

The left panel (sometimes known as the Joining of Adam and Eve) depicts a scene from the paradise of the Garden of Eden commonly interpreted as the moment when God presents Eve to Adam. The painting shows Adam waking from a deep sleep to find God holding Eve by her wrist and giving the sign of his blessing to their union. God is younger-looking than on the outer panels, blue-eyed and with golden curls. His youthful appearance may be a device by the artist to illustrate the concept of Christ as the incarnation of the Word of God. God's right hand is raised in blessing while he holds Eve's wrist with his left.

According to the work's most controversial interpreter, the 20th-century folklorist and art historian Wilhelm Fraenger:

As though enjoying the pulsation of the living blood and as though too he were setting a seal on the eternal and immutable communion between this human blood and his own. This physical contact between the Creator and Eve is repeated even more noticeably in the way Adam's toes touch the Lord's foot. Here is the stressing of a rapport: Adam seems indeed to be stretching to his full length to make contact with the Creator. And the billowing out of the cloak around the Creator's heart, from where the garment falls in marked folds and contours to Adam's feet, also seems to indicate that here a current of divine power flows down, so that this group of three actually forms a closed circuit, a complex of magical energy ...

Eve avoids Adam's gaze, although, according to Walter S. Gibson, she is shown "seductively presenting her body to Adam". Adam's expression is one of amazement; Fraenger suggests three elements to his seeming astonishment. Firstly, there is surprise at the presence of the God; secondly he is reacting to an awareness that Eve is of the same nature as himself, and has been created from his own body. Finally, from the intensity of Adam's gaze, it might be that he is experiencing sexual arousal for the first time.

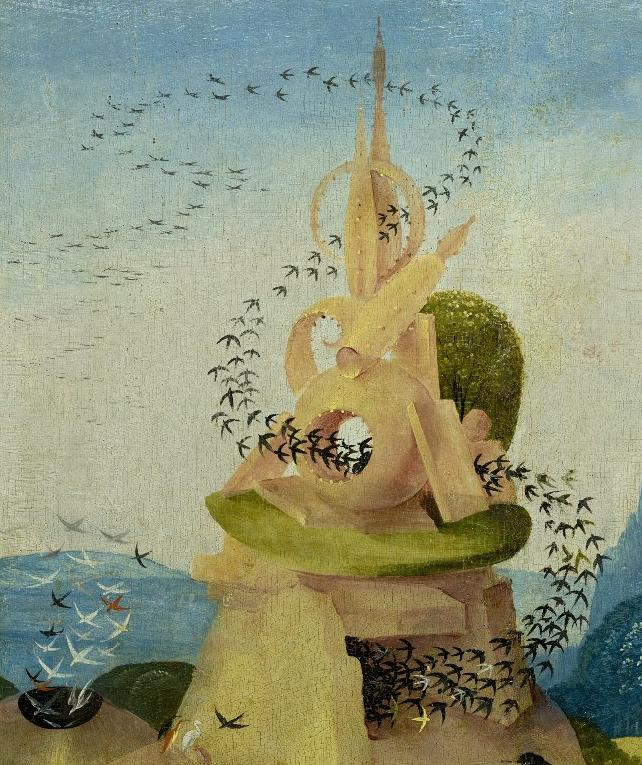
Birds swarming through cavities of a hut-shaped form in the left background of the left panel

The outer landscape contains hut-shaped forms, some made from stone, others are at least partially organic. Behind Eve, rabbits – symbolizing fecundity – play in the grass, and a dragon tree opposite is thought to represent eternal life. The background reveals several animals that would have been exotic to contemporaneous Europeans, including a giraffe, a monkey riding an elephant, and a lion that has killed and is about to devour his prey. In the foreground, from a large hole in the ground, emerge birds and winged animals, some of which are realistic, some fantastic. Behind a fish, a person clothed in a short-sleeved hooded jacket and with a duck's beak holds an open book as if reading.

To the left of the area, a cat holds a small lizard-like creature in its jaws. Belting observes that, although the creatures in the foreground are fantastical imaginings, many of the animals in the mid and background are drawn from contemporary travel literature, and here Bosch is appealing to "the knowledge of a humanistic and aristocratic readership". Erhard Reuwich's pictures for Bernhard von Breydenbach's 1486 Pilgrimages to the Holy Land were long thought to be the source for both the elephant and the giraffe, though more recent research indicates the mid-15th-century humanist scholar Cyriac of Ancona's travelogues served as Bosch's exposure to these exotic animals.

According to art historian Virginia Tuttle, the scene is "highly unconventional [and] cannot be identified as any of the events from the Book of Genesis traditionally depicted in Western art." Some of the images contradict the innocence expected in the Garden of Eden. Tuttle and other critics have interpreted the gaze of Adam upon his wife as lustful and indicative of the Christian belief that humanity was doomed from the beginning. Gibson believes that Adam's facial expression betrays not just surprise but also expectation. According to a belief common in the Middle Ages, before the Fall, Adam and Eve would have copulated without lust solely to reproduce. Many believed that the first sin committed after Eve tasted the forbidden fruit was carnal lust. On a tree to the right, a snake curls around a tree trunk, while to its right, a mouse creeps; according to Fraenger, both animals are universal phallic symbols.

==== Center panel ====
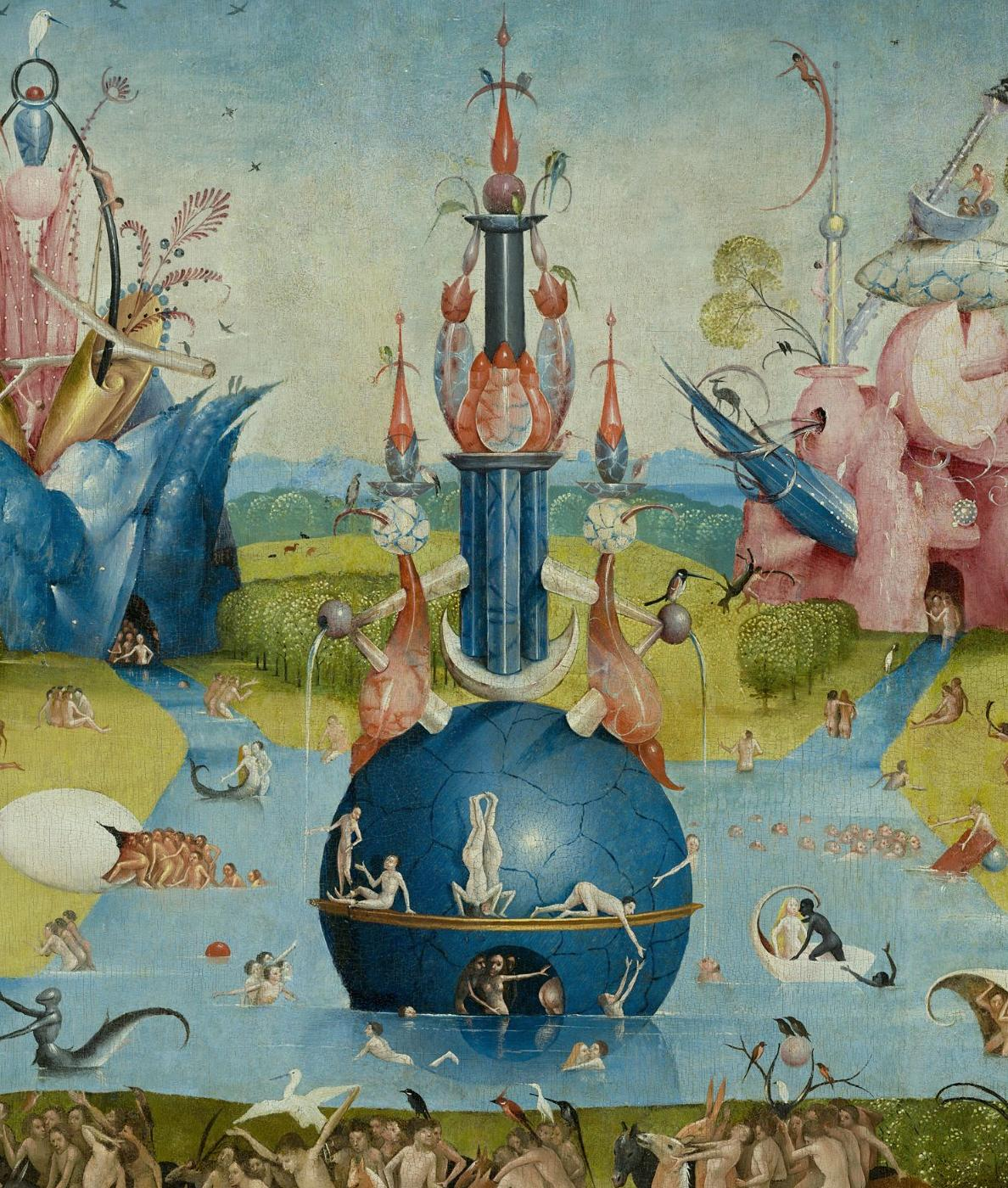
The central water-bound globe in the middle panel's upper background is a hybrid of stone and organic matter.

The skyline of the center panel (220 × 195 cm, 87 × 77 in) matches exactly with that of the left wing, while the positioning of its central pool and the lake behind it echoes the lake in the earlier scene. The center image depicts the expansive "garden" landscape, which gives the triptych its name. The panel shares a common horizon with the left wing, suggesting a spatial connection between the two scenes. The garden is teeming with male and female nudes, together with various animals, plants, and fruits.

The setting is not the paradise shown in the left panel, nor is it based in the terrestrial realm. Fantastic creatures mingle with the real; otherwise ordinary fruits appear engorged to a gigantic size. The figures are engaged in diverse amorous sports and activities, both in couples and in groups. Gibson describes them as behaving "overtly and without shame," while art historian Laurinda Dixon writes that the human figures exhibit "a certain adolescent sexual curiosity".

Many of the numerous human figures revel in an innocent, self-absorbed joy as they engage in a wide range of activities; some appear to enjoy sensory pleasures, others play unselfconsciously in the water, and yet others cavort in meadows with a variety of animals, seemingly at one with nature. In the middle of the background, a large blue globe resembling a fruit pod rises in the middle of a lake. Visible through its circular window, there is a man holding his right hand close to his partner's genitals and the bare buttocks of yet another figure hovering in the vicinity. According to Fraenger, the eroticism of the center frame could be considered either as an allegory of spiritual transition or a playground of corruption.

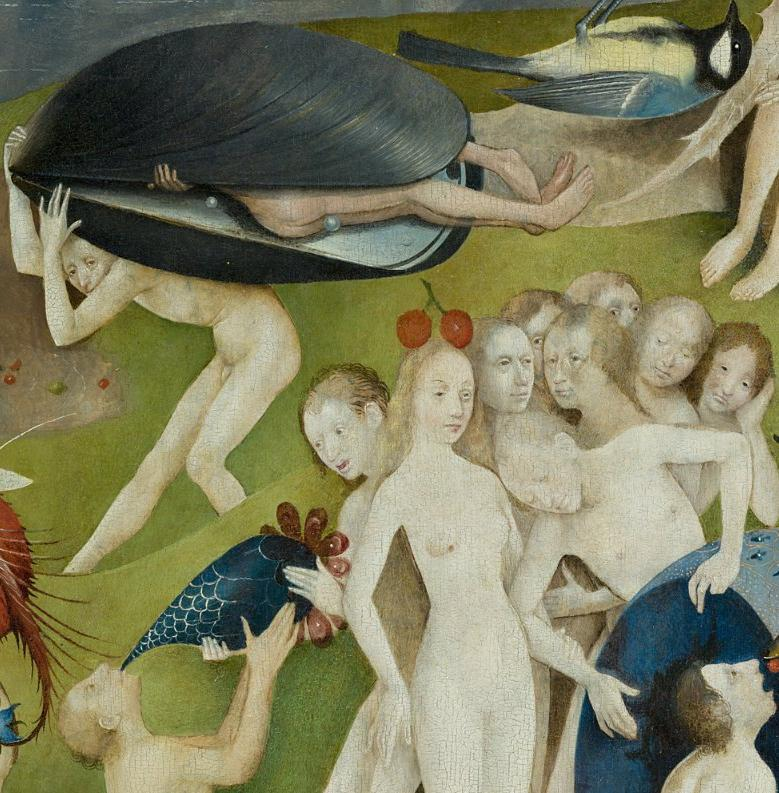
A group of females from the center panel. The head of one female is adorned with two cherries—a symbol of pride. To her right, a male drinks lustfully from an organic vessel. Behind the group, a male carries a couple encased in a mussel shell.

On the right-hand side of the foreground, there is a group of four figures standing, three white- and one black-skinned. The white-skinned figures, two males and one female are covered from head to foot in light-brown body hair. Scholars generally agree that these hirsute figures represent wild or primeval humanity but disagree on the symbolism of their inclusion. Art historian Patrik Reuterswärd, for example, posits that they may be seen as "the noble savage" who represents "an imagined alternative to our civilized life", imbuing the panel with "a more clear-cut primitivistic note". Writer Peter Glum, in contrast, sees the figures as intrinsically connected with whoredom and lust.

In a cave to their lower right, a male figure points towards a reclining female who is also covered in hair. The pointing man is the only clothed figure in the panel, and as Fraenger observes, "he is clothed with emphatic austerity right up to his throat." In addition, he is one of the few human figures with dark hair. According to Fraenger:

The way this man's dark hair grows, with the sharp dip in the middle of his high forehead, as though concentrating there all the energy of the masculine M, makes his face different from all the others. His coal-black eyes are rigidly focused in a gaze that expresses compelling force. The nose is unusually long and boldly curved. The mouth is wide and sensual, but the lips are firmly shut in a straight line, the corners strongly marked and tightened into final points, and this strengthens the impression—already suggested by the eyes—of a strong controlling will. It is an extraordinarily fascinating face, reminding us of faces of famous men, especially of Machiavelli's; and indeed, the whole aspect of the head suggests something Mediterranean, as though this man had acquired his frank, searching, superior air at Italian academies.

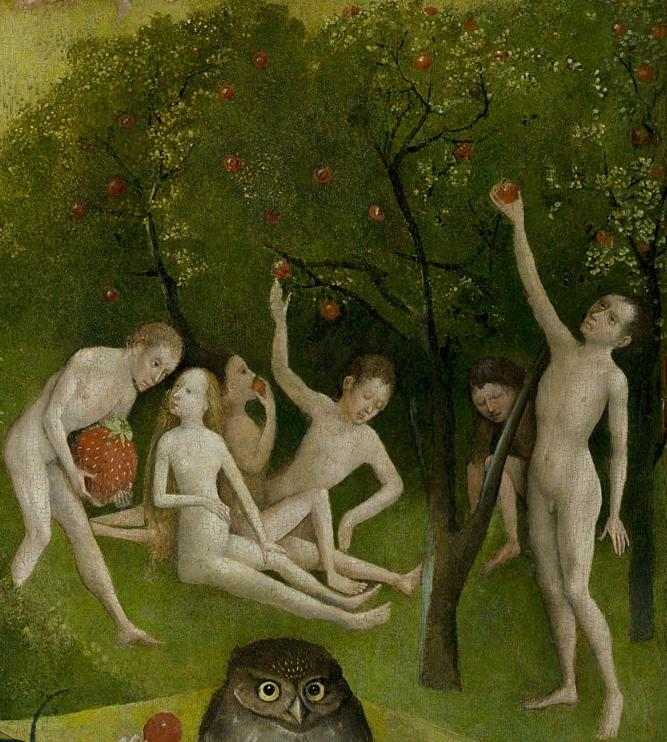
Male figures pluck fruit from a tree. One carries a large strawberry while an owl is in the foreground.

The pointing man has variously been described as either the patron of the work (Fraenger in 1947), as Adam denouncing Eve (Dirk Bax in 1956), as Saint John the Baptist in his camel's skin (Isabel Mateo Goméz in 1963), or as a self-portrait. The woman below him lies within a semicylindrical transparent shield, while her mouth is sealed, devices implying that she bears a secret. To their left, a man crowned by leaves lies on top of what appears to be an actual but gigantic strawberry, and is joined by a male and female who contemplate another equally huge strawberry.

There is no perspectival order in the foreground, which comprises a series of small motifs wherein proportion and terrestrial logic are abandoned. Bosch presents the viewer with gigantic ducks playing with tiny humans under cover of oversized fruit; fish walking on land while birds dwell in the water; a passionate couple encased in an amniotic fluid bubble; and a man inside of a red fruit staring at a mouse in a transparent cylinder.

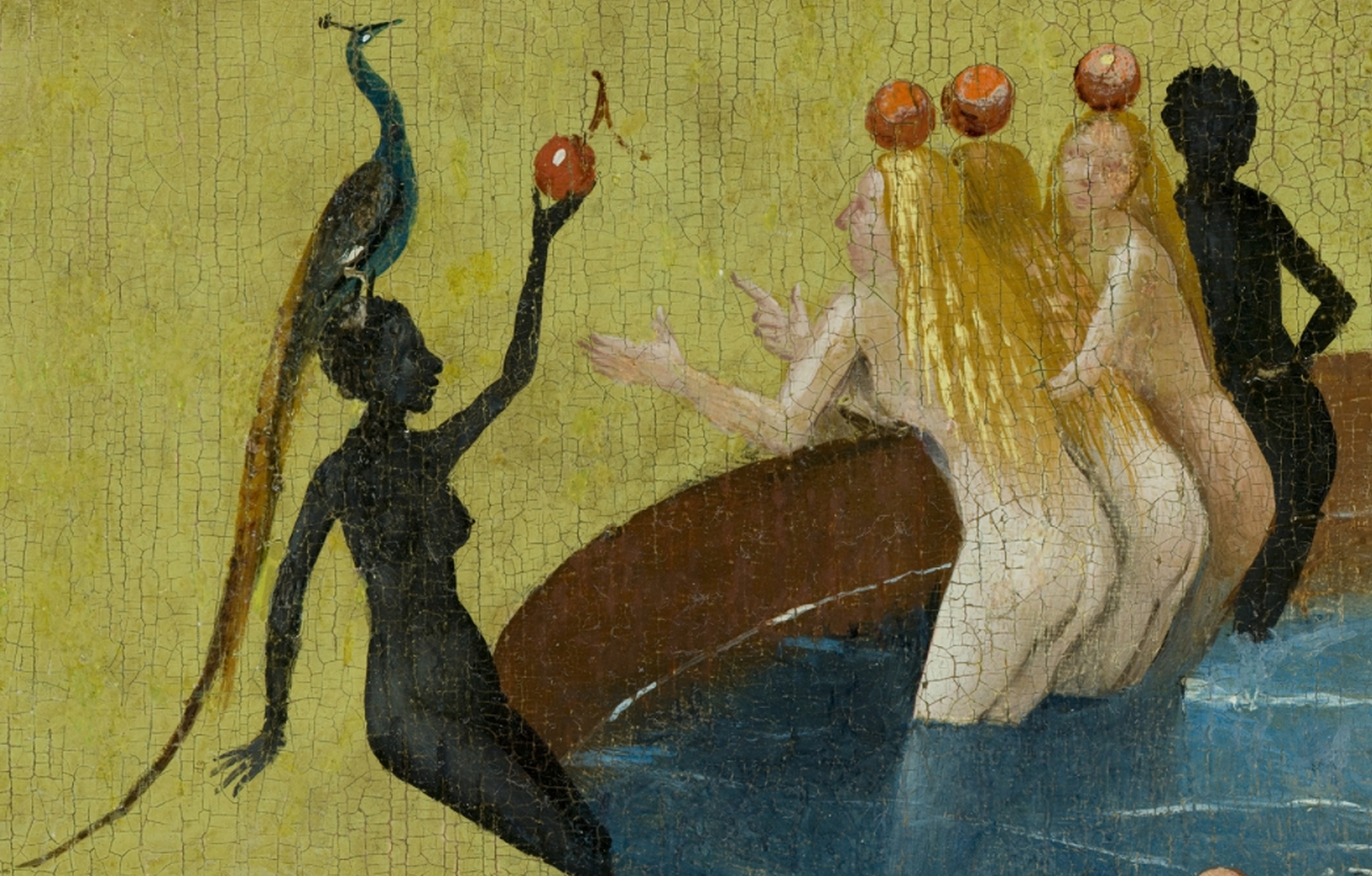
Naked figures seek pleasure in various ways.

The pools in the fore and background contain bathers of both sexes. In the central circular pool, the sexes are mostly segregated, with several females adorned by peacocks and fruit. Four women carry cherry-like fruits on their heads, perhaps a symbol of pride at the time, as has been deduced from the contemporaneous saying: "Don't eat cherries with great lords—they'll throw the pits in your face."

The women are surrounded by a parade of naked men riding horses, donkeys, unicorns, camels, and other exotic or fantastic creatures. Several men show acrobatics while riding, apparently acts designed to gain the females' attention, which highlights the attraction felt between the two sexes as groups. The two outer springs also contain both men and women cavorting with abandon. Around them, birds infest the water while winged fish crawl on land. Humans inhabit giant shells. All are surrounded by oversized fruit pods and eggshells, and both humans and animals feast on strawberries and cherries.

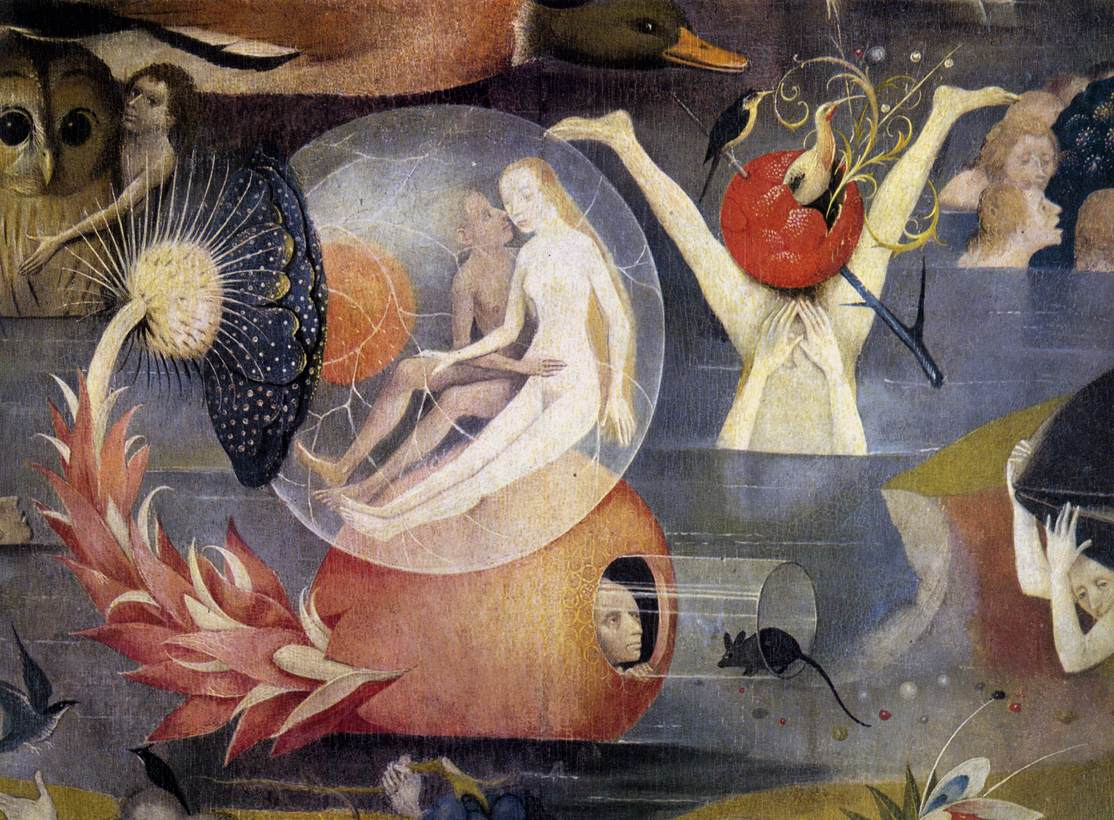
Detail showing nudes within a transparent sphere, which is the fruit of a plant

The impression of a life lived without consequence, or what art historian Hans Belting describes as "unspoilt and pre-moral existence", is underscored by the absence of children and old people. According to the second and third chapters of Genesis, Adam and Eve's children were born after they were expelled from Eden. This has led some commentators, in particular Belting, to theorise that the panel represents the world if the two had not been driven out "among the thorns and thistles of the world". In Fraenger's view, the scene illustrates "a utopia, a garden of divine delight before the Fall, or—since Bosch could not deny the existence of the dogma of original sin—a millennial condition that would arise if, after expiation of Original Sin, humanity were permitted to return to Paradise and a state of tranquil harmony embracing all Creation."

In the high distance of the background, above the hybrid stone formations, four groups of people and creatures are seen in flight. On the immediate left, a human male rides on a chthonic solar eagle-lion. The human carries a triple-branched tree of life on which perches a bird, according to Fraenger, "a symbolic bird of death". Fraenger believes the man is intended to represent a genius, "he is the symbol of the extinction of the duality of the sexes, which are resolved in the ether into their original state of unity".

To their right, a knight with a dolphin tail sails on a winged fish. The knight's tail curls back to touch the back of his head, referencing the common symbol of eternity: the snake biting its own tail. On the immediate right of the panel, a winged youth soars upwards, carrying a fish in his hands and a falcon on his back.

According to Belting, in these passages, Bosch's "imagination triumphs ... the ambivalence of [his] visual syntax exceeds even the enigma of content, opening up that new dimension of freedom by which painting becomes art." Fraenger titled his chapter on the high background "The Ascent to Heaven" and wrote that the airborne figures were likely intended as a link between "what is above" and "what is below," just as the left and right-hand panels represent "what was" and "what will be."

==== Right panel ====
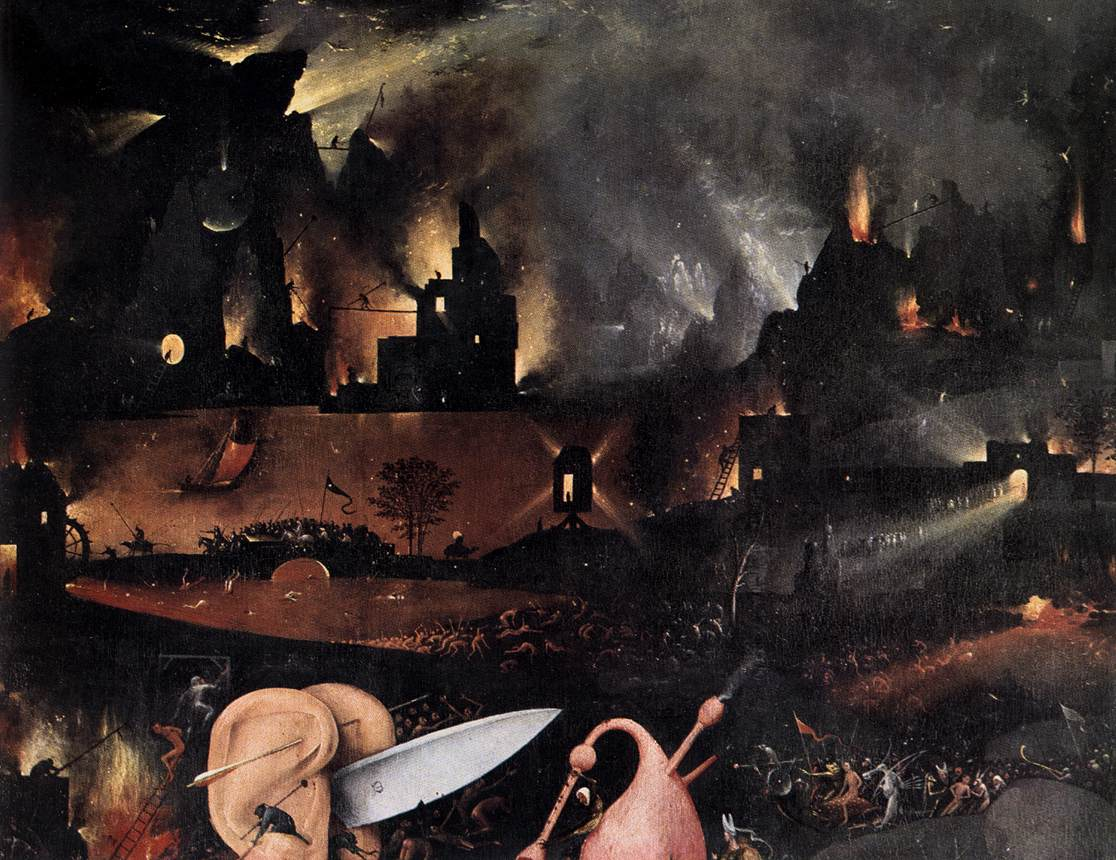
A scene from the hellscape panel showing the long beams of light emitted from the burning city in the panel's background

The right panel (220 × 97.5 cm, 87 × 38.4 in) illustrates Hell, the setting of a number of Bosch paintings. Bosch depicts a world in which humans have succumbed to temptations that lead to evil and reap eternal damnation. The tone of this final panel strikes a harsh contrast to those preceding it. The scene is set at night, and the natural beauty that adorned the earlier panels is noticeably absent. Compared to the warmth of the center panel, the right wing possesses a chilling quality—rendered through cold colourisation and frozen waterways—and presents a tableau that has shifted from the paradise of the center image to a spectacle of cruel torture and retribution.

In a single, densely detailed scene, the painting depicts cities on fire in the background; war, torture chambers, infernal taverns, and demons in the midground, and mutated animals feeding on human flesh in the foreground. The nakedness of the human figures has lost all its eroticism, and many figures are shown covering their genitalia and breasts with their hands, ashamed by their nakedness.

Large explosions in the background throw light through the city gates and spill into the water in the midground; according to writer Walter S. Gibson, "their fiery reflection turning the water below into blood". The light illuminates a road filled with fleeing figures, while hordes of tormentors prepare to burn a neighbouring village. A short distance away, a rabbit carries an impaled and bleeding corpse while a group of victims above are thrown into a burning lantern.

The foreground is populated by various distressed or tortured figures. Some are shown vomiting or excreting, others are crucified by harp and lute, in an allegory of music, thus sharpening the contrast between pleasure and torture. A choir sings from a score inscribed on a pair of buttocks, part of a group that has been described as the "Musicians' Hell".

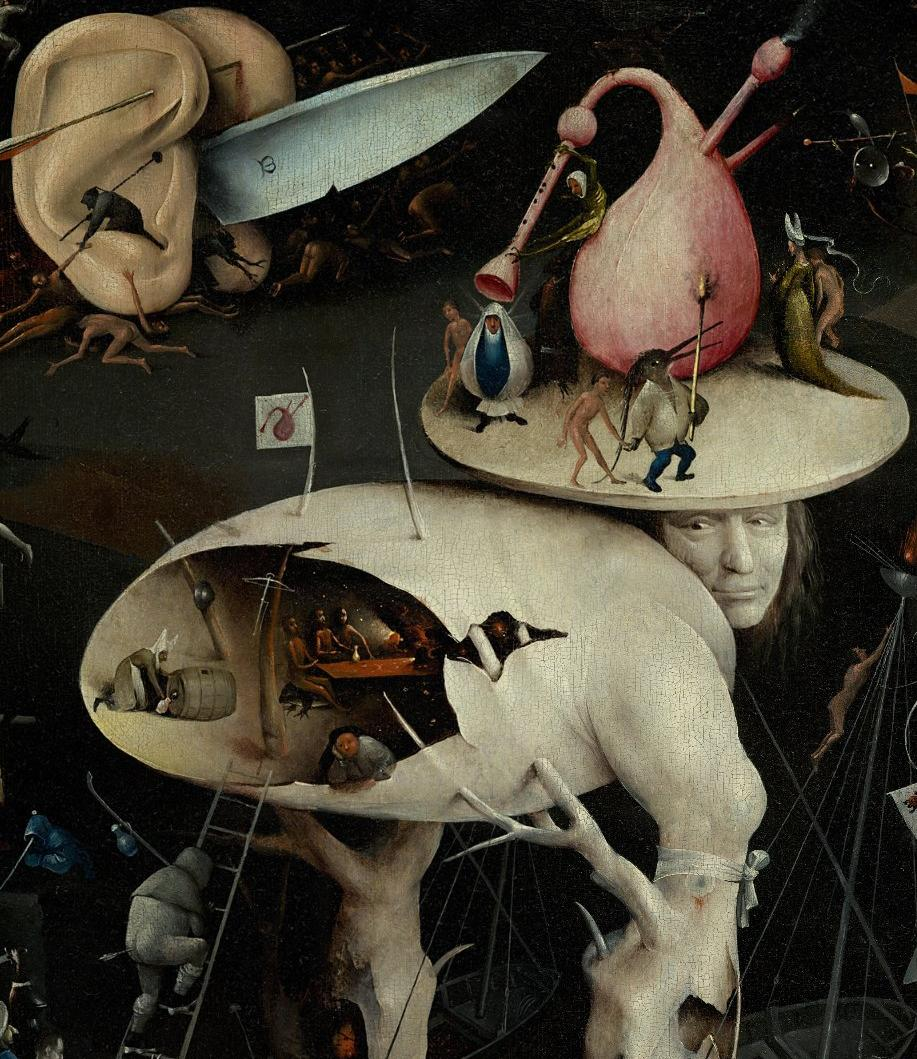
The "Tree-Man" of the right panel, and a pair of human ears brandishing a blade. A cavity in the torso is populated by three naked persons at a table, seated on an animal, and a fully clothed woman pouring drink from a barrel.

The focal point of the scene is the "Tree-Man," whose cavernous torso is supported by what could be contorted arms or rotting tree trunks. His head supports a disk populated by demons and victims parading around a huge set of bagpipes—often used as a dual sexual symbol—reminiscent of human scrotum and penis. The tree-man's torso is formed from a broken eggshell, and the supporting trunk has thornlike branches which pierce the fragile body. A grey figure in a hood bearing an arrow jammed between his buttocks climbs a ladder into the tree-man's central cavity, where nude men sit in a tavern-like setting. The tree-man gazes outwards beyond the viewer, his conspiratorial expression a mix of wistfulness and resignation. Belting proposed that the tree-man's face is a self-portrait, citing the figure's "expression of irony and the slightly sideways gaze [which would] then constitute the signature of an artist who claimed a bizarre pictorial world for his own personal imagination".

Many elements in the panel incorporate earlier iconographical conventions depicting hell. However, Bosch is innovative in that he describes hell not as a fantastical place but as a realistic world containing many elements from day-to-day human life.

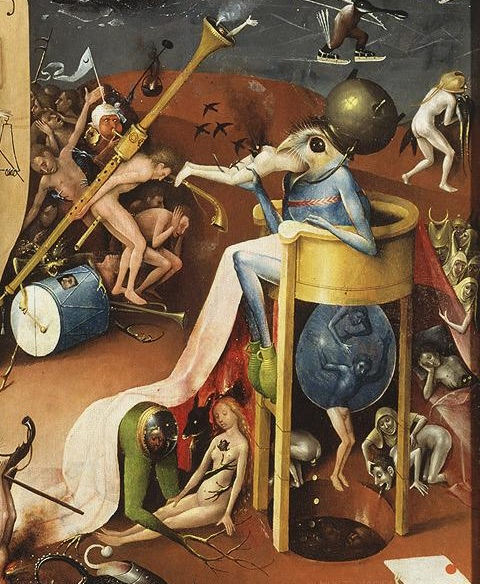
Gibson compares this "Prince of Hell" to a figure in the 12th-century Irish religious text Vision of Tundale, who feeds on the souls of corrupt and lecherous clergy.

Animals are shown punishing humans, subjecting them to nightmarish torments that may symbolise the seven deadly sins, matching the torment to the sin. Sitting on an object that may be a toilet or a throne, the panel's centerpiece is a gigantic bird-headed monster feasting on human corpses, which he excretes through a cavity below him, into the transparent chamber pot on which he sits. The monster is sometimes referred to as the "Prince of Hell," a name derived from the cauldron he wears on his head, perhaps representing a debased crown. At his feet, a female has her face reflected on the buttocks of a demon. Further to the left, next to a hare-headed demon, a group of naked persons around a toppled gambling table are being massacred with swords and knives. Other brutal violence is shown by a knight torn down and eaten up by a pack of wolves to the right of the tree-man.

During the Middle Ages, sexuality and lust were seen by some as evidence of humanity's fall from grace. In the eyes of some viewers, this sin is depicted in the left-hand panel through Adam's allegedly lustful gaze toward Eve, and it has been proposed that the center panel was created as a warning to the viewer to avoid a life of sinful pleasure. According to this view, the penalty for such sins is shown in the right panel of the triptych. In the lower right-hand corner, a man is approached by a pig wearing the veil of a nun. The pig is shown trying to seduce the man to sign legal documents.

Lust is further said to be symbolised by the gigantic musical instruments and by the choral singers in the left foreground of the panel. Musical instruments often carried erotic connotations in works of art of the period, and lust was referred to in moralising sources as the "music of the flesh". There has also been the view that Bosch's use of music here might be a rebuke against traveling minstrels, often thought of as purveyors of bawdy song and verse.

== Dating and provenance ==
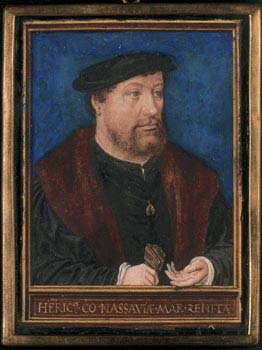
Henry III of Nassau-Breda (1483–1538) by Bernard van Orley. Henry may have been the patron of Bosch's triptych: he was well known as an avid collector of art.

The dating of The Garden of Earthly Delights is uncertain. Ludwig von Baldass (1917) considered the painting to be an early work by Bosch. However, since De Tolnay (1937) consensus among 20th-century art historians placed the work in 1503–1504 or even later. Both early and late datings were based on the "archaic" treatment of space. Dendrochronology dates the oak of the panels between the years 1460 and 1466, providing the earliest date (terminus post quem) for the work.

The wood used for panel paintings during this period usually underwent lengthy storage for seasoning, so the oak might likely predate the painting by several years. Internal evidence, specifically the depiction of a pineapple (a "New World" fruit), suggests that the painting itself postdates Columbus' voyages to the Americas, between 1492 and 1504. The dendrochronological research brought Vermet to reconsider an early dating and, consequently, to dispute the presence of any "New World" objects, stressing the presence of African ones instead.

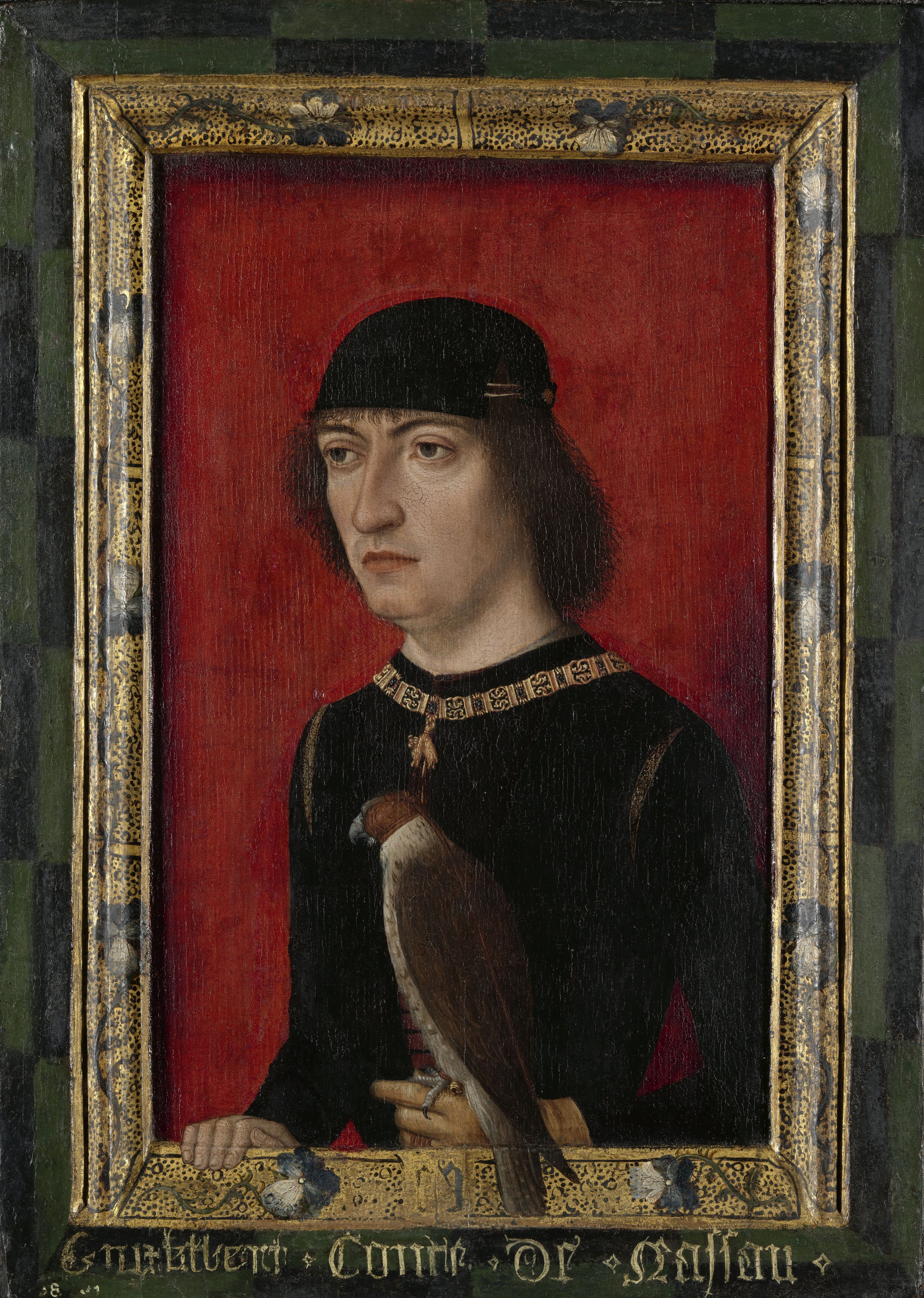
Portrait of Engelbrecht II of Nassau (1451–1504) in the Rijksmuseum Amsterdam

The Garden was first documented in 1517, one year after the artist's death, when Antonio de Beatis, a canon from Molfetta, Italy, described the work as part of the decoration in the town palace of the Counts of the House of Nassau in Brussels, the Nassau palace. The palace was a high-profile location, a house often visited by heads of state and leading court figures. The prominence of the painting has led some to conclude that the work was commissioned and not "solely ... a flight of the imagination". A description of the triptych in 1605 called it the "strawberry painting," because the fruit of the strawberry tree (madroño in Spanish) features prominently in the center panel. Early Spanish writers referred to the work as La Lujuria ("Lust").

The aristocracy of the Burgundian Netherlands, influenced by the humanist movement, were the most likely collectors of Bosch's paintings, but there are few records of the location of his works in the years immediately following his death. It is probable that the patron of the work was Engelbrecht II of Nassau, who died in 1504, or his successor Henry III of Nassau-Breda, the governor of several of the Habsburg provinces in the Low Countries. De Beatis wrote in his travel journal that "there are some panels on which bizarre things have been painted. They represent seas, skies, woods, meadows, and many other things, such as people crawling out of a shell, others that bring forth birds, men and women, whites and blacks doing various activities and poses."

Because the triptych was publicly displayed in the palace of the House of Nassau, it was visible to many, and Bosch's reputation and fame quickly spread across Europe. The work's popularity can be measured by the numerous surviving copies—in oil, engraving and tapestry—commissioned by wealthy patrons, as well as by the number of forgeries in circulation after his death. Most are of the central panel only and do not deviate from the original. These copies were usually painted on a much smaller scale and varied considerably in quality. Many were created a generation after Bosch, and some took the form of wall tapestries.

The De Beatis description, only rediscovered by Steppe in the 1960s, cast new light on the commissioning of a work that was previously thought—since it has no central religious image—to be an atypical altarpiece. Many Netherlandish diptychs intended for private use are known, and even a few triptychs, but the Bosch panels are unusually large compared with these and contain no donor portraits. Possibly, they were commissioned to celebrate a wedding, as large Italian paintings for private houses frequently were. Nevertheless, The Garden's bold depictions do not rule out a church commission, such as the contemporaneous fervour to warn against immorality. In 1566, the triptych served as the model for a tapestry that hangs at El Escorial monastery near Madrid.

Upon the death of Henry III, the painting passed into the hands of his nephew William the Silent, the founder of the House of Orange-Nassau and leader of the Dutch Revolt against Spain. In 1568, however, the Duke of Alba confiscated the picture and brought it to Spain, where it became the property of one Don Fernando, the Duke's illegitimate son and heir and the Spanish commander in the Netherlands. Philip II acquired the painting at auction in 1591; two years later he presented it to El Escorial. A contemporaneous description of the transfer records the gift on 8 July 1593 of a "painting in oils, with two wings depicting the variety of the world, illustrated with grotesqueries by Hieronymus Bosch, known as 'Del Madroño'".

After an unbroken 342 years at El Escorial, the work moved to the Museo del Prado in 1939, along with other works by Bosch. The triptych was not particularly well preserved; the paint on the middle panel, in particular, had flaked off around the joints in the wood. However, recent restoration works have managed to recover and maintain it in a very good state of quality and preservation. The painting usually is on display in a room with other works by Bosch.

== Sources and context ==
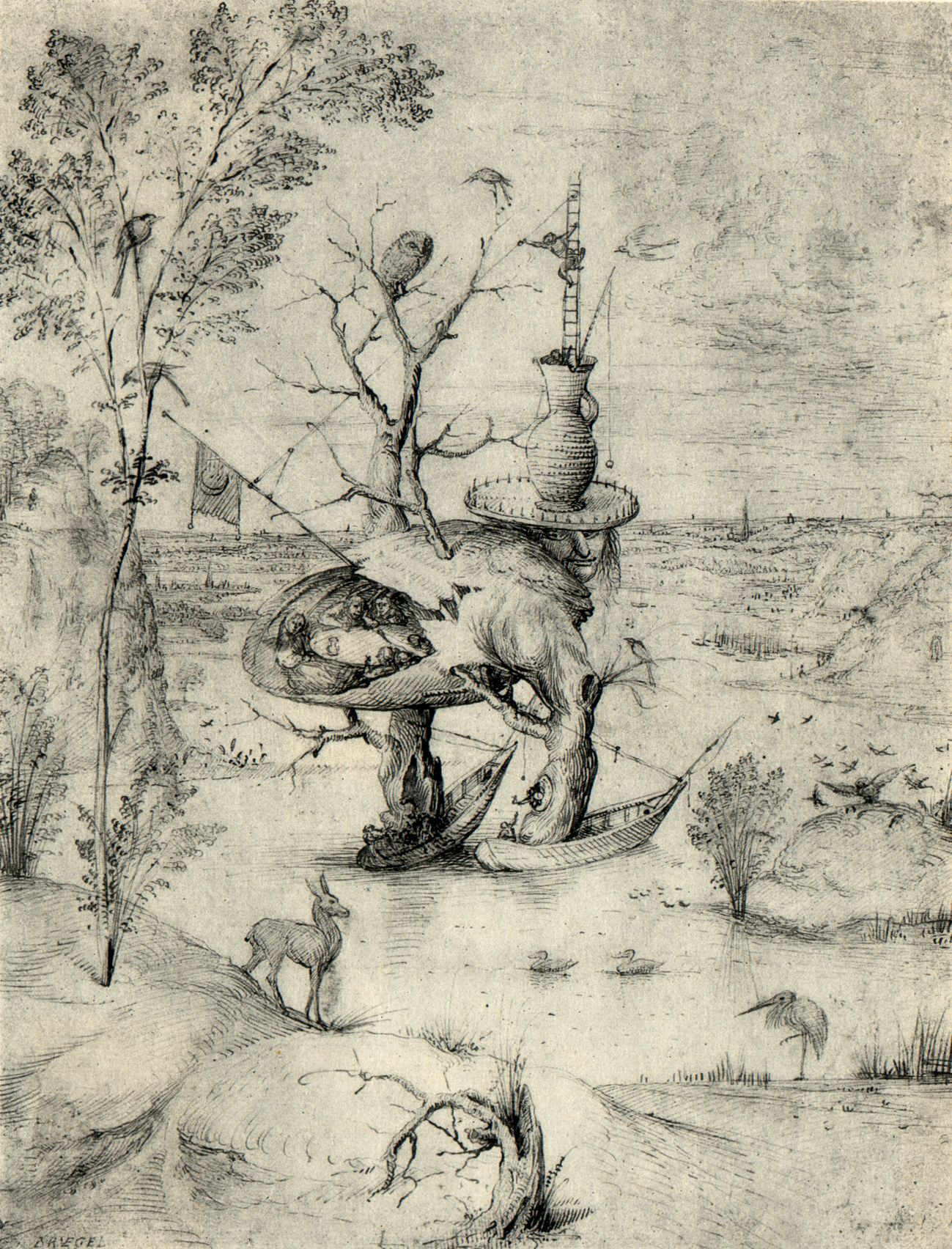
Hieronymus Bosch, Man Tree, c. 1470s. The "Tree-Man" of the right-hand panel, depicted in an earlier drawing by Bosch. This pen and bistre version contain no suggestion of Hell, yet its outline was adapted into one of The Garden's most memorable grotesques.

Little is known with certainty about the life of Hieronymus Bosch or the commissions or influences that may have formed the basis for the iconography of his work. His birthdate, education, and patrons remain unknown. There is no surviving record of Bosch's thoughts or evidence as to what attracted and inspired him to such an individual mode of expression. Through the centuries, art historians have struggled to resolve this question, yet conclusions remain fragmentary at best. Scholars have debated Bosch's iconography more extensively than that of any other Netherlandish artist. His works are generally regarded as enigmatic, leading some to speculate that their content refers to contemporaneous esoteric knowledge since lost to history.

Although Bosch's career flourished during the High Renaissance, he lived in an area where the beliefs of the medieval Church still held moral authority. He would have been familiar with some of the new forms of expression, especially those in Southern Europe, although it is difficult to attribute with certainty which artists, writers, and conventions had a bearing on his work.

José de Sigüenza is credited with the first extensive critique of The Garden of Earthly Delights, in his 1605 History of the Order of St. Jerome. He argued against dismissing the painting as either heretical or merely absurd, commenting that the panels "are a satirical comment on the shame and sinfulness of mankind". The art historian Carl Justi observed that the left and center panels are drenched in tropical and oceanic atmosphere, and concluded that Bosch was inspired by "the news of recently discovered Atlantis and by drawings of its tropical scenery, just as Columbus himself, when approaching terra firma, thought that the place he had found at the mouth of the Orinoco was the site of the Earthly Paradise."

The period in which the triptych was created was a time of adventure and discovery when tales and trophies from the New World sparked the imagination of poets, painters, and writers. Although the triptych contains many unearthly and fantastic creatures, Bosch still appealed in his images and cultural references to an elite humanist and aristocratic audience. Bosch reproduces a scene from Martin Schongauer's engraving Flight into Egypt.

Conquest in Africa and the East provided both wonder and terror to European intellectuals, as it led to the conclusion that Eden could never have been an actual geographical location. The Garden references exotic travel literature of the 15th century through the animals, including lions and a giraffe, in the left panel. The giraffe has been traced to Cyriac of Ancona, a travel writer known for visiting Egypt during the 1440s. The exoticism of Cyriac's sumptuous manuscripts may have inspired Bosch's imagination.

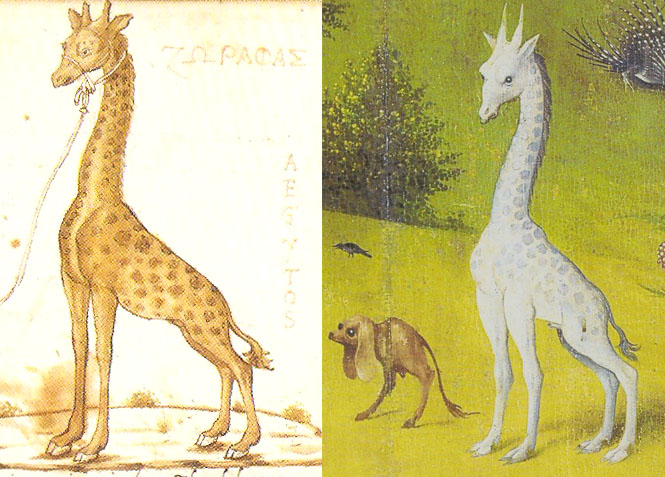
The giraffe on the right side of the left panel may be drawn from copies of those in Cyriac of Ancona's Egyptian Voyage (left), which was published c. 1440.

The charting and conquest of this new world made real regions previously only idealised in the imagination of artists and poets. At the same time, the certainty of the old biblical paradise began to slip from the grasp of thinkers into the realms of mythology. In response, treatment of the Paradise in literature, poetry, and art shifted towards a self-consciously fictional Utopian representation, as exemplified by the writings of Thomas More (1478–1535).

Albrecht Dürer was an avid student of exotic animals and drew many sketches based on his visits to European zoos. Dürer visited 's-Hertogenbosch during Bosch's lifetime, and it is likely the two artists met and that Bosch drew inspiration from the German's work.

Attempts to find sources for the work in literature from the period have not been successful. Art historian Erwin Panofsky wrote in 1953, "In spite of all the ingenious, erudite and in part extremely useful research devoted to the task of "decoding Jerome Bosch," I cannot help feeling that the real secret of his magnificent nightmares and daydreams has still to be disclosed. We have bored a few holes through the door of the locked room, but somehow, we do not seem to have discovered the key." The humanist Desiderius Erasmus has been suggested as a possible influence; the writer lived in 's-Hertogenbosch in the 1480s, and it is likely he knew Bosch. Glum remarked on the triptych's similarity of tone with Erasmus's view that theologians "explain (to suit themselves) the most difficult mysteries ... is it a possible proposition: God the Father hates the Son? Could God have assumed the form of a woman, a devil, an ass, a gourd, a stone?"

== Interpretation ==
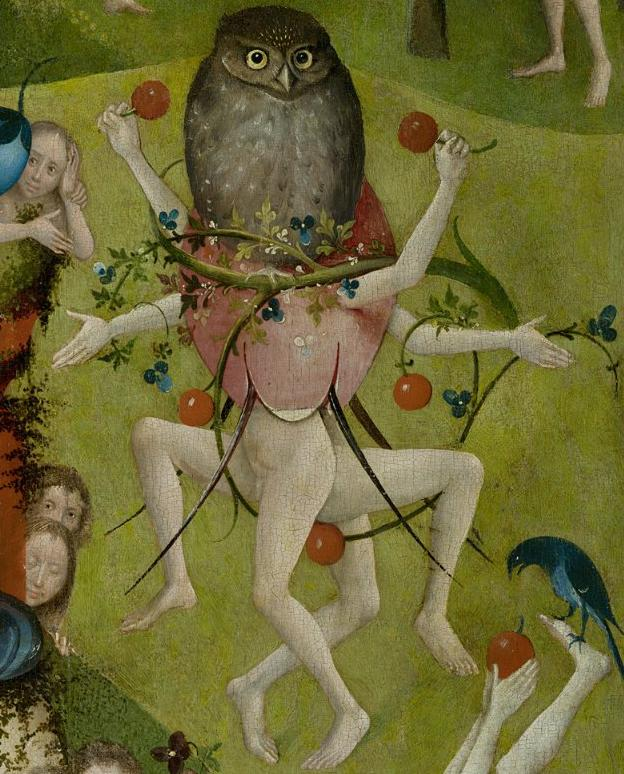
Detail from the center panel showing two cherry-adorned dancing figures who carry a surface on which an owl is perched. In the front right corner, a bird standing on a reclining human's foot is about to eat from a cherry offered to it.

Because only bare details are known of Bosch's life, interpretation of his work can be an extremely difficult area for academics as it is largely reliant on conjecture. Individual motifs and elements of symbolism may be explained, but so far, relating these to each other and his work as a whole has remained elusive. The enigmatic scenes depicted on the panels of the inner triptych of The Garden of Earthly Delights have been studied by many scholars, who have often arrived at contradictory interpretations. Analyses based on symbolic systems ranging from the alchemical, astrological, and heretical to the folkloric and subconscious have all attempted to explain the complex objects and ideas presented in the work. Until the early 20th century, Bosch's paintings were generally thought to incorporate attitudes of Medieval didactic literature and sermons. Charles De Tolnay wrote that

The oldest writers, Dominicus Lampsonius and Karel van Mander, attached themselves to his most evident side, to the subject; their conception of Bosch, inventor of fantastic pieces of devilry and infernal scenes, which prevails today (1937) in the public at large, and prevailed with historians until the last quarter of the 19th century.

Generally, his work is described as a warning against lust, and the central panel as a representation of the transience of worldly pleasure. In 1960, the art historian Ludwig von Baldass wrote that Bosch shows "how sin came into the world through the Creation of Eve, how fleshly lusts spread over the entire earth, promoting all the Deadly Sins, and how this necessarily leads straight to Hell." De Tolnay wrote that the center panel represents "the nightmare of humanity," where "the artist's purpose above all is to show the evil consequences of sensual pleasure and to stress its ephemeral character." Supporters of this view hold that the painting is a sequential narrative, depicting mankind's initial state of innocence in Eden, followed by the subsequent corruption of that innocence, and finally, its punishment in Hell. At various times in its history, the triptych has been known as La Lujuria, The Sins of the World and The Wages of Sin.

Proponents of this idea point out that people during Bosch's era believed that it was woman's—ultimately Eve's—temptation that drew men into a life of lechery and sin. This would explain why the women in the center panel are very much among the active participants in bringing about the Fall. At the time, the power of femininity was often rendered by showing a female surrounded by a circle of males. A late 15th-century engraving by Israhel van Meckenem shows a group of men prancing ecstatically around a female figure. The Master of the Banderoles's 1460 work the Pool of Youth similarly shows a group of females standing in a space surrounded by admiring figures.

This line of reasoning is consistent with interpretations of Bosch's other major Christian works, which hold up the folly of man; the Death and the Miser and the Haywain. Although according to the art historian Walter Bosing, each of these works is rendered in a manner which makes it difficult to believe "Bosch intended to condemn what he painted with such visually enchanting forms and colors." Bosing concludes that a medieval mindset was naturally suspicious of material beauty in any form and that the sumptuousness of Bosch's description may have been intended to convey a false paradise teeming with transient beauty.

In 1947, Wilhelm Fränger argued that the triptych's center panel portrays a joyous world when mankind will experience a rebirth of the innocence enjoyed by Adam and Eve before their fall. In his book The Millennium of Hieronymus Bosch, Fränger wrote that Bosch was a member of the heretical sect known as the Adamites—who was also known as the Homines intelligentia and Brethren and Sisters of the Free Spirit. This radical group, active in the area of the Rhine and the Netherlands, strove for a form of spirituality immune from sin even in the flesh and imbued the concept of lust with a paradisical innocence.

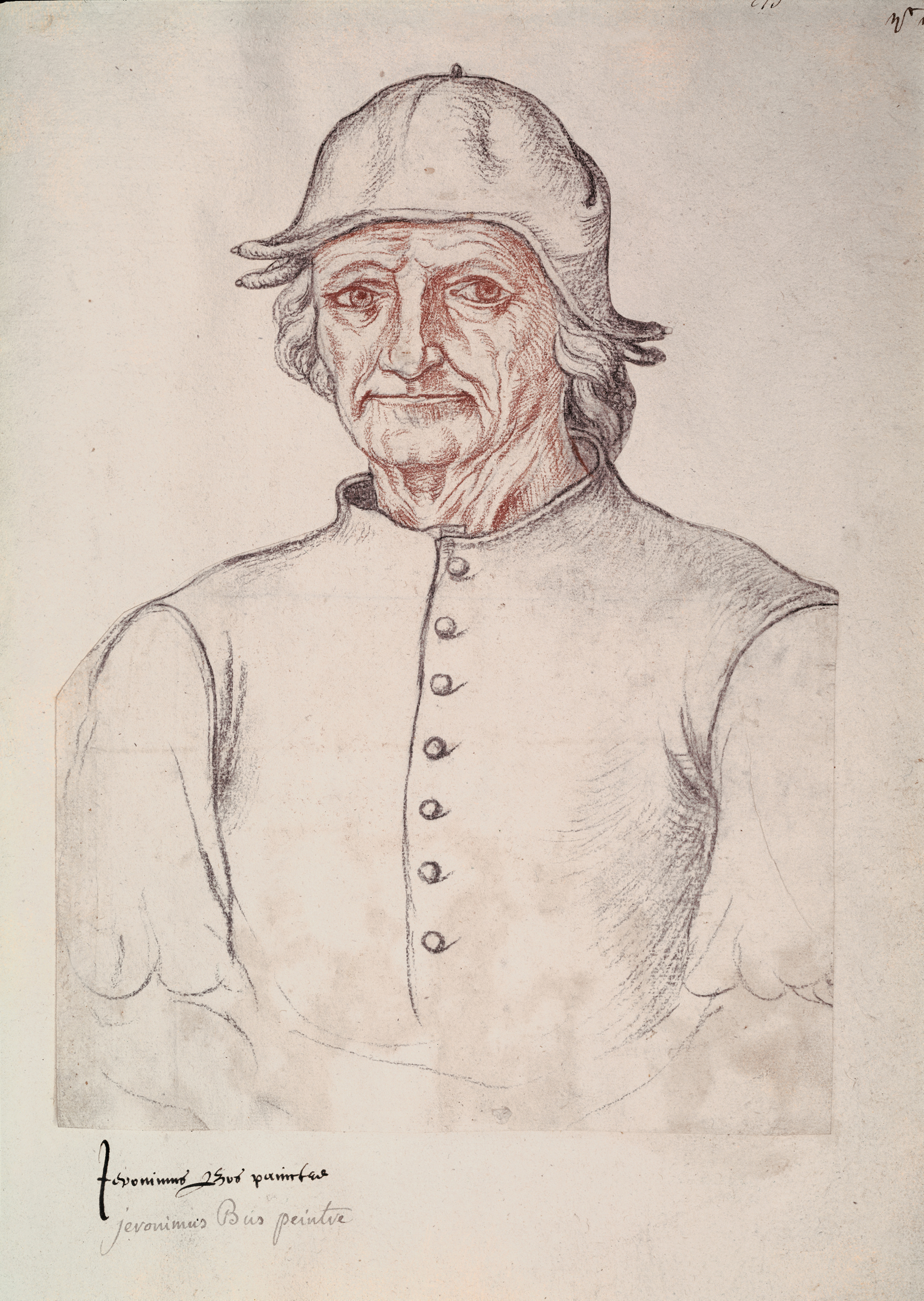
Hieronymus Bosch, in a c. 1550 drawing once thought to be a copy of a self-portrait. His age in this representation (believed to be around 60 years) has been used to estimate his date of birth, although its attribution remains uncertain.

Fränger believed The Garden of Earthly Delights was commissioned by the order's Grand Master. Later critics have agreed that, because of their obscure complexity, Bosch's "altarpieces" may well have been commissioned for non-devotional purposes. The Homines intelligentia cult sought to regain the innocent sexuality enjoyed by Adam and Eve before the Fall. Fränger writes that the figures in Bosch's work "are peacefully frolicking about the tranquil garden in vegetative innocence, at one with animals and plants and the sexuality that inspires them seems to be pure joy, pure bliss." Fränger argued against the notion that the hellscape shows the retribution handed down for sins committed in the center panel. Fränger saw the figures in the garden as peaceful, naive, and innocent in expressing their sexuality and at one with nature. In contrast, those being punished in Hell comprise "musicians, gamblers, desecrators of judgment and punishment."

Examining the symbolism in Bosch's art—"the freakish riddles ... the irresponsible phantasmagoria of an ecstatic"—Fränger concluded that his interpretation applied to Bosch's three altarpieces only: The Garden of Earthly Delights, The Temptation of Saint Anthony, and the Haywain Triptych. Fränger distinguished these pieces from the artist's other works and argued that despite their anti-cleric polemic, they were nevertheless all altarpieces, probably commissioned for the devotional purposes of a mystery cult. While commentators accept Fränger's analysis as astute and broad in scope, they have often questioned his final conclusions. These are regarded by many scholars as hypotheses only and built on an unstable foundation and what can only be conjecture. Critics argue that artists during this period painted not for their pleasure but for commission, while the language and secularization of a post-Renaissance mindset projected onto Bosch would have been alien to the late-Medieval painter.

Fränger's thesis stimulated others to examine The Garden more closely. Writer Carl Linfert also senses the joyfulness of the people in the center panel but rejects Fränger's assertion that the painting is a "doctrinaire" work espousing the "guiltless sexuality" of the Adamite sect. While the figures engage in amorous acts without any suggestion of the forbidden, Linfert points to the elements in the center panel suggesting death and temporality: some figures turn away from the activity, seeming to lose hope in deriving pleasure from the passionate frolicking of their cohorts. Writing in 1969, E. H. Gombrich drew on a close reading of Genesis and the Gospel According to Saint Matthew to suggest that the central panel is, according to Linfert, "the state of mankind on the eve of the Flood, when men still pursued pleasure with no thought of the morrow, their only sin the unawareness of sin."

A 2016 study has put the spotlight back on the alleged "lack of scientific foundation" of Fraenger's esoteric interpretation. This latest study definitively departs from the traditional reading, which chronologically speaking would go from the "Creation of the World" (flaps closed) to the "Threat of Hell" (left flap open, on the viewer's right), via "Paradise Lost" (right flap open, on our left) and "Pre-Diluvian Earthly Life" (central panel). It corroborates – as a starting point for the reading of this triptych – the contemporary interpretation of Jean Wirth, followed by Frédéric Elsig and Hans Belting: that of the vision of the reality of an infernal present. So the open triptych should be read chronologically, not from left to right, but from right to left, from the infernal description of the chaotic, dispersed human condition (left panel open, on our right) to the unity rediscovered in the reintegration by the masculine principle of the feminine principle (right panel open, on our left), passing through a vast ritual of transmutation that looks like a nebula, aka the "feast of metamorphoses" (central panel). What's more, the thesis is put forward that Bosch deliberately inverted the physical and structural layout of the two side panels. The pure and simple retroversion of these two panels is the only way of restoring the triptych to its original spatio-temporal coherence by re-establishing a chronological reading from left to right. In this way, a real continuity of space, topography, style, and colour is restored between the two side panels and the central panel. Moreover, the three pieces of this triptych now behave like communicating vessels in a perpetual vortex-like movement. This inversion is said to have been deliberately created by Hieronymus Bosch to blur the lines of his pictorial manifesto, which was originally so heterodox and subversive, not to say heretical, in the eyes of the Roman Catholic Church of his time.

== Legacy ==
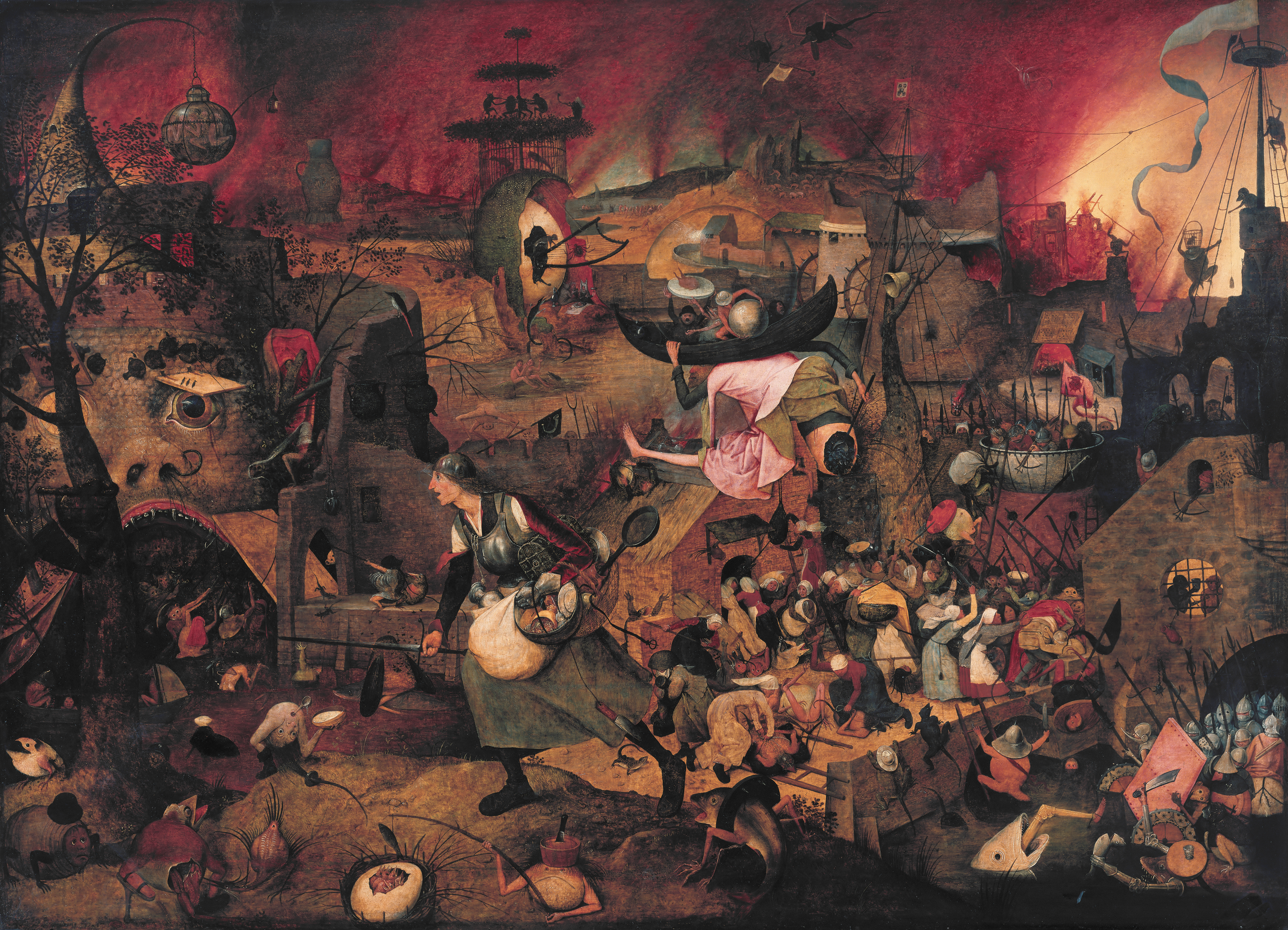
Pieter Bruegel the Elder, Dulle Griet, 1562. While Bruegel's Hellscapes were influenced by The Garden's right panel, his aesthetic betrays a more pessimistic view of humanity's fate.

Joan Miró, The Tilled Field (1923–1924). This early Surrealist complex of objects and figures structurally and figuratively quotes Bosch's involved arrangement of sexually active characters from the center panel of The Garden of Earthly Delights.

Because Bosch was such a unique and visionary artist, his influence has not spread as widely as that of other major painters of his era. However, there have been instances of later artists incorporating elements of The Garden of Earthly Delights into their work. Pieter Bruegel the Elder (c. 1525–1569) in particular directly acknowledged Bosch as an important influence and inspiration, and incorporated many elements of the inner right panel into several of his most popular works. Bruegel's Mad Meg depicts a peasant woman leading an army of women to pillage Hell, while his The Triumph of Death (c. 1562) echoes the monstrous Hellscape of The Garden, and uses, according to the Royal Museum of Fine Arts Antwerp, the same "unbridled imagination and the fascinating colours".

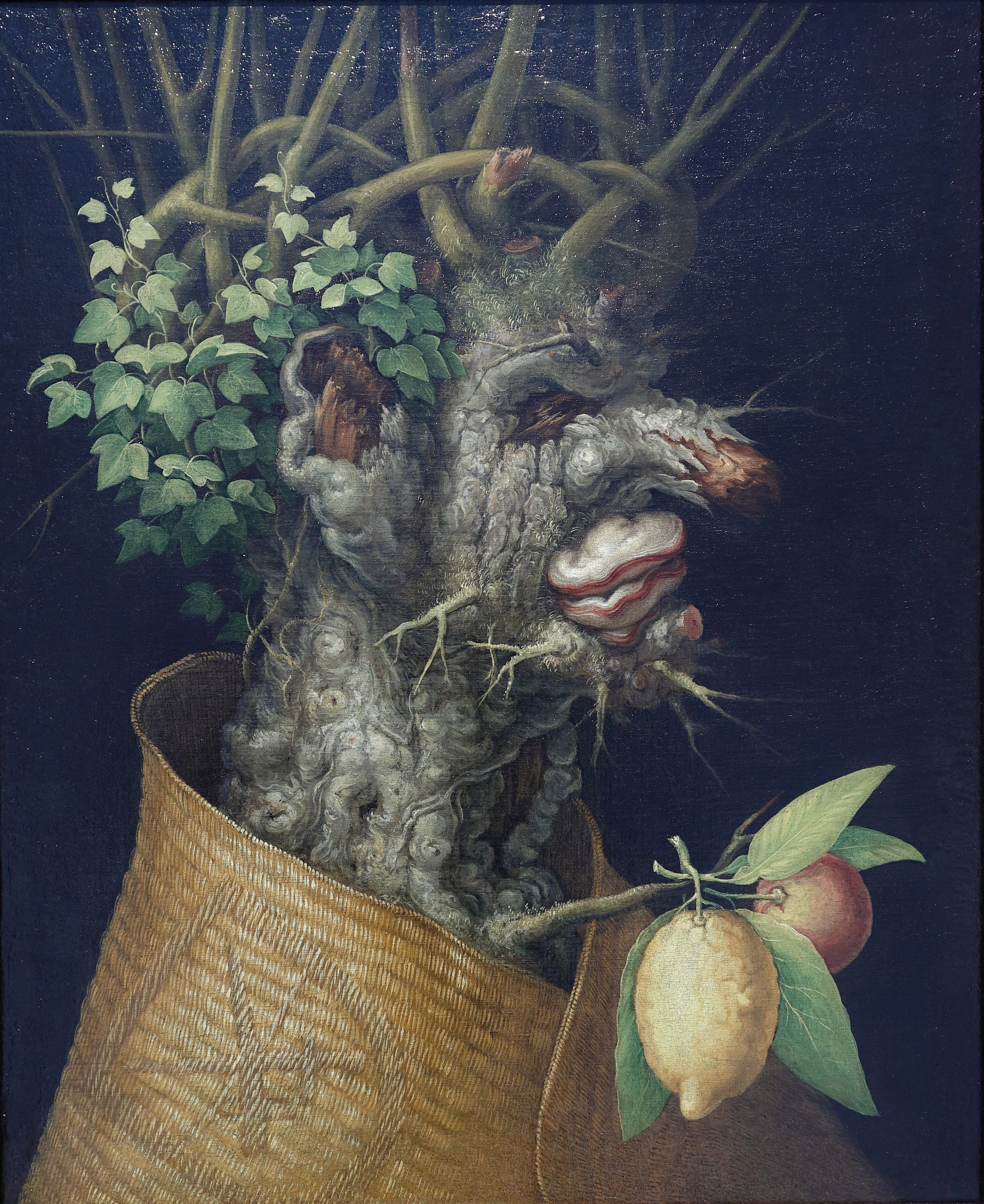
Giuseppe Arcimboldo, Winter, 1573. The concept of the "Tree-man", the hybrid organism, as well as the engorged fruit, all bear hallmarks of Bosch's Garden.

While the Italian court painter Giuseppe Arcimboldo (c. 1527–1593) did not create Hellscapes, he painted a body of strange and "fantastic" vegetable portraits—generally heads of people composed of plants, roots, webs and various other organic matter. These strange portraits rely on and echo a motif partly inspired by Bosch's willingness to break from strict, faithful representations of nature. The Flemish painter David Teniers the Younger (c. 1610–1690) quoted both Bosch and Bruegel throughout his career in such works as his versions of the Temptation of St Anthony, the Rich Man in Hell and his version of Mad Meg.

During the early 20th century, Bosch's work underwent a rise in critical and popular appraisal. The early surrealists' fascination with dreamscapes, the autonomy of the imagination, and a free-flowing connection to the unconscious brought about a renewed interest in his work. Bosch's imagery struck a chord with Joan Miró and Salvador Dalí in particular. Both knew his paintings firsthand, having seen The Garden of Earthly Delights in the Museo del Prado, and both regarded him as an art-historical mentor. Miró's The Tilled Field contains several parallels to Bosch's Garden: similar flocks of birds; pools from which living creatures emerge; and oversized disembodied ears all echo the Dutch master's work. Dalí's 1929 The Great Masturbator is similar to an image on the right side of the left panel of Bosch's Garden, composed of rocks, bushes and little animals resembling a face with a prominent nose and long eyelashes.

== Sources ==
- Baldass, Ludwig von. Hieronymus Bosch. London: Thames and Hudson, 1960. ASIN B0007DNZR0
- Belting, Hans. Garden of Earthly Delights. Munich: Prestel, 2005. ISBN 3-7913-3320-8
- Bosing, Walter. Hieronymus Bosch, C. 1450–1516: Between Heaven and Hell. Berlin: Taschen, 2000. ISBN 3-8228-5856-0
- Burness, Donald B. "Pieter Bruegel: Painter for Poets". Art Journal, Volume 32, No. 2, Winter, 1972–1973
- Boulboullé, Guido, "Groteske Angst. Die Höllenphantasien des Hieronymus Bosch". In: Auffarth, Christoph and Kerth, Sonja (Eds): "Glaubensstreit und Gelächter: Reformation und Lachkultur im Mittelalter und in der Frühen Neuzeit", LIT Verlag Berlin, 2008, pp. 55–78
- Cinotti, Mia. The Complete Paintings of Bosch. London: Weidenfeld and Nicolson, 1969
- De Beatis, Antonio. The Travel Journal of Antonio De Beatis Through Germany, Switzerland, the Low Countries, France and Italy, 1517–18. London: Hakluyt Society, 1999. ISBN 0-904180-07-7.
- De Tolnay, Charles. Hieronymus Bosch. Tokyo: Eyre Methuen, 1975. ISBN 0-413-33280-2. Original publication: Hieronymus Bosch, Basel: Holbein, 1937, 129 pages text, 128 pages images
- Delevoy, Robert L. Bosch: Biographical and Critical Study. Lausanne: Skira, 1960
- Fraenger, Wilhelm and Kaiser, Ernst. The Millennium of Hieronymus Bosch. New York: Hacker Art Books, 1951. Original publication: Wilhelm Fraenger, Hieronymus Bosch – das Tausendjährige Reich. Grundzüge einer Auslegung, Winkler-Verlag Coburg 1947, 142 pages
- Gibson, Walter S. Hieronymus Bosch. New York: Thames and Hudson, 1973. ISBN 0-500-20134-X
- Glum, Peter. "Divine Judgment in Bosch's 'Garden of Earthly Delights". The Art Bulletin, Volume 58, No. 1, March 1976, 45–54.
- Glum, Peter. The key to Bosch's "Garden of Earthly Delights" found in allegorical Bible interpretation, Volume I. Tokyo: Chio-koron Bijutsu Shuppan, 2007. ISBN 978-4-8055-0545-8
- Gómez, Isabel Mateo. "Hieronymus Bosch: The Garden of Earthly Delights". In Gaillard, J. and M. Hieronymus Bosch: The Garden of Earthly Delights. New York: Clarkson N. Potter, 1989. ISBN 0-517-57230-3
- Harbison, Craig. The Art of the Northern Renaissance. London: Weidenfeld & Nicolson, 1995. ISBN 0-297-83512-2.
- Kleiner, Fred & Mamiya, Christian J. Gardner's Art Through the Ages. California: Wadsworth/Thompson Learning, 2005. ISBN 0-534-64091-5
- Koldeweij, A. M. (Jos) and Vandenbroeck, Paul and Vermet, Bernard M. Hieronymus Bosch: The Complete Paintings and Drawings. New York: Harry N. Abrams, 2001(a). ISBN 0-8109-6735-9
- Koldeweij, A. M. (Jos) and Vermet, Bernard M. with Kooy, Barbera van (edit.) Hieronymus Bosch: New Insights Into His Life and Work. New York: Harry N. Abrams, 2001(b). ISBN 90-5662-214-5
- Larsen, Erik. Hieronymus Bosch. New York: Smithmark, 1998. ISBN 0-7651-0865-8
- Linfert, Carl (tr. Robert Erich Wolf). Bosch. London: Thames and Hudson, 1972. ISBN 0-500-09077-7. Original publication: Hieronymus Bosch – Gesamtausgabe der Gemälde, Köln: Phaidon Verlag 1959, 26 pages text, 93 pages images
- Moxey, Keith. "Hieronymus Bosch and the 'World Upside Down': The Case of The Garden of Earthly Delights". Visual Culture: Images and Interpretations. Connecticut: Wesleyan University Press, 1994, 104–140. ISBN 0-8195-6267-X
- Moray, Gerta. "Miró, Bosch and Fantasy Painting". The Burlington Magazine, Volume 113, No. 820, July 1971. Max Ernst's favourite painters and poets of the past
- Oliveira, Paulo Martins, Jheronimus Bosch, 2012. ISBN 978-1-4791-6765-4
- Pokorny, Erwin, "Hieronymus Bosch und das Paradies der Wollust". In: "Frühneuzeit-Info", Jg. 21, Heft 1+2 (Sonderband "Die Sieben Todsünden in der Frühen Neuzeit"), 2010, pp. 22–34
- Rooth, Anna Birgitta. Exploring the garden of delights: Essays in Bosch's paintings and the medieval mental culture. California: Suomalainen tiedeakatemia, 1992. ISBN 951-41-0673-3
- Snyder, James. Hieronymus Bosch. New York: Excalibur Books, 1977. ISBN 0-89673-060-3
- Snyder, James. The Northern Renaissance: Painting, Sculpture, the Graphic Arts from 1350 to 1575. Second edition. New Jersey: Prentice Hall, 2004. ISBN 0-13-150547-5
- Veen, Henk Van & Ridderbos, Bernhard. Early Netherlandish Paintings: Rediscovery, Reception, and Research. Amsterdam: Amsterdam University Press, 2004. ISBN 90-5356-614-7
- Vermet, Bernard M. "Baldass was right" in Jheronimus Bosch. His Sources. 2nd International Jheronimus Bosch Conference May 22–25, 2007 Jheronimus Bosch Art Center. 's-Hertogenbosch 2010. ISBN 978-90-816227-4-5 "Online".
- Hieronymus Bosch. London: Grange Books, 2005. ISBN 1-84013-657-X
- Matthijs Ilsink, Jos Koldeweij, Hieronymus Bosch: Painter and Draughtsman – Catalogue raisonné, Mercatorfonds nv; 2016
