= The infernal names =

List of Infernal Names as recorded in The Satanic Bible by Anton LaVey

The Infernal Names is a compiled list of adversarial or antihero figures from mythology intended for use in Satanic ritual. The following names are as listed in The Satanic Bible (1969), written by Church of Satan founder Anton Szandor LaVey. When calling the names, all of them may be recited, or a given number of those most significant to the respective working may be chosen.

== The Infernal Names ==
=== Egyptian names ===
- Amon: Egyptian ram-headed god of life and reproduction
- Bast: Egyptian goddess of pleasure represented by the cat
- Sekhmet: Egyptian goddess of vengeance
- Set: Egyptian god of evil
- Thoth: Egyptian god of wisdom

=== Hebrew names ===
- Abaddon: (Hebrew) the destroyer
- Asmodeus: Hebrew devil of sensuality and luxury, originally "creature of judgment"
- Azazel: (Hebrew) taught man to make weapons of war, introduced cosmetics
- Balaam: Hebrew devil of avarice and greed
- Beelzebub: (Hebrew) Lord of the Flies, taken from symbolism of the scarab
- Behemoth: Hebrew personification of Satan in the form of an elephant
- Haborym: Hebrew synonym for Satan
- Lilith: Hebrew female devil, Adam's first wife who taught him the ropes
- Mastema: Hebrew synonym for Satan
- Naamah: Hebrew female devil of seduction
- Sammael: (Hebrew) "venom of God"

=== Greco-Roman names ===
- Apollyon: Greek synonym for Satan, the arch fiend
- Demogorgon: Greek name of the devil, it is said should not be known to mortals
- Diabolus: (Greek) "flowing downwards"
- Eurynomos: Greek Prince of Death
- Gorgo: dim. of Demogorgon, Greek name of the devil
- Hecate: Greek goddess of the underworld and witchcraft
- Mephistopheles: (Greek) he who shuns the light, q. v. Faust (Greek)
- Mormo: (Greek) King of the Ghouls, consort of Hecate
- Pan: Greek god of lust, later relegated to devildom
- Typhon: Greek father of monsters
- Pluto: Roman god of the underworld
- Proserpina: Roman queen of the underworld

=== Norse names ===
- Fenrir: depicted as a wolf, the son of Loki
- Loki: Norse god of mischief and chaos and a Teutonic devil
- Jörmungandr: depicted as a serpent, the son of Loki

=== Hindu names ===
- Kali: Hindu goddess of destruction, time, and death; daughter of Shiva; high priestess of the Thuggees
- Shiva: Hindu god of destruction and time, titled "The Destroyer".

=== Native American names ===
- Coyote: Indigenous American devil
- Nihasa: Indigenous American devil
- Sedit: Indigenous American devil
- Ahpuch: Mayan devil
- Supay: Inca god of the underworld
- Metztli: Aztec goddess of the night
- Mictian: Aztec god of death
- Tezcatlipoca: Aztec god of Hell
- Yaotzin: Aztec god of Hell

=== Other names ===
- Adramelech: Samarian devil
- Ahriman: Mazdean devil
- Astaroth: Phoenician goddess of lasciviousness, equivalent of Babylonian Ishtar
- Baalberith: Canaanite Lord of the covenant who was later made a devil
- Baphomet: allegedly worshipped by the Templars as symbolic of Satan
- Beherit: Syriac name for Satan
- Bilé: Celtic god of Hell
- Chemosh: National god of Moabites, later a devil
- Cimeries: Rides a black horse and rules Africa
- Dagon: Philistine avenging devil of the sea
- Damballa: Haitian Vodou serpent god
- Emma-O: Japanese ruler of Hell
- Ishtar: Babylonian goddess of fertility
- Mammon: Aramaic god of wealth and profit
- Mania: Etruscan goddess of Hell
- Mantus: Etruscan god of Hell
- Marduk: god of the city of Babylon
- Melek Taus: Yezidi devil
- Milcom: Ammonite devil
- Moloch: Phoenician and Canaanite devil
- Nergal: Babylonian god of Hades
- Nija: Polish god of the underworld
- O-Yama: Japanese name for Satan
- Pwcca: Welsh name for Satan
- Rimmon: Syrian devil worshipped at Damascus
- Sabazios: Phrygian origin, identified with Dionysos, snake worship
- Samnu: Central Asian devil
- Shaitan: Arabic name for Satan
- T'an-mo: Chinese counterpart to the devil, covetousness, desire
- Tchort: Russian name for Satan, "black god"
- Thamuz: Sumerian god who later was relegated to devildom
- Tunrida: Scandinavian female devil
- Yen-lo-Wang: Chinese ruler of Hell

== See also ==
- Anton LaVey
- Church of Satan
- LaVeyan Satanism
- Left-hand path and right-hand path
- Luciferianism
- Satanism
- The Satanic Bible
- The Satanic Temple
- Theistic Satanism
