= The Tilled Field =

Painting by Joan Miró

- Artist: Joan Miró
- Year: 1924
- Medium: oil on canvas
- Dimensions: 66 cm × 92.7 cm (26 in × 36.5 in)
- Location: Solomon R. Guggenheim Museum, New York

The Tilled Field (French: La terre labourée; Catalan: Terra llaurada) is a 1923–1924 oil-on-canvas painting by Catalan painter Joan Miró, depicting a stylized view of his family's farm at Mont-roig del Camp in Catalonia. The painting shows the development from Miró's earlier works, such as The Farm, and is considered to be one of his first Surrealist works, created around the same time as the more abstracted Catalan Landscape (The Hunter). It is held by the Solomon R. Guggenheim Museum, in New York.

== Analysis ==
The Tilled Field is dominated by muted tones of yellow and brown (khaki). The painting is divided into three areas by two horizontal lines. A diagonal line puts the top right corner of the painting in the dark of night, while the rest is in the light of day. The painting is littered with a confused mixture of forms, most of which with aspects of animals, and plants, with one in the bottom middle appearing seemingly as a mixture of both with a human. The various animal forms are derived from Catalan ceramics, including a lizard wearing a conical hat. A tree to the right of the centre has a large eye in its green crown and a human ear on its brown trunk. Hanging from the tree is a shape covered with more eyes, possibly a pinecone, or perhaps a visual representation of the forbidden fruit, with both eyes and the ear on the tree representing the power that is acquiring knowledge; at the base of the tree is a folded newspaper with the French word jour (day). Further right, in the background, is a human figure following a cattle-drawn plough, possibly (although not really since ploughs weren’t around during Palaeolithic era and the person on the painting has a hat reassembling a matador’s one so at best this could be a faint homage if even that) based on the Altamira cave paintings. Also in the background, towards the centre, is a ramshackle house with a chimney, and further left a tree-like object bearing the flags of France, Spain and Catalonia. Another plant-like object to the left bears a further, Italian flag.
