= Ludwig von Baldass =

Austrian historian, author (1887–1963)

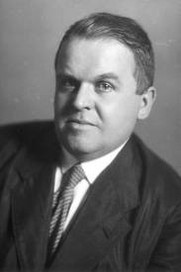
Ludwig von Baldass, c. 1918

Ludwig von Baldass (German: Ludwig von Baldaß; 1887–1963) was an Austrian art historian, professor and acclaimed author who specialised in Early Netherlandish painting. After the University of Graz, the University of Halle, and the Ludwig-Maximilians-Universität München, he studied under Max Dvořák at the University of Vienna and began to lecture there in 1926, gaining the position of professor in 1934. Baldass' 1942 treatise on Hans Memling was instrumental in the re-evaluation of the artist's importance. Other publications include articles and books on Jan van Eyck (published in 1952), Hieronymus Bosch (1943), Giorgione (1964) and Albrecht Altdorfer (1941).

Following the Anschluss with Nazi Germany, Baldass adhered to the Nazis' policy on the arts. When the Reich began a campaign of plundering works from Jewish collectors, members of the Rothschild family attempted to leave the country, taking their paintings with them. Baldass, acting as a faithful Nazi party member, resisted and frustrated their efforts in a bid to prevent the works from leaving Austria. As a result, most passed into the hands of the Nazi state. After the war, Louis Rothschild attempted to reclaim parts of his collection, but Baldass made use of his influence and bargained that some pieces should stay in the care of the state Kunsthistorisches Museum, in return for the passage of a number of others back to the Rothschild family. The Rothschild family eventually and reluctantly conceded to these terms.

Baldass retired from lecturing in 1949 and devoted himself to writing; his most important works were published after 1952. He was married to Paula Wagner, granddaughter of the architect Otto Wagner.

== Publications ==
- Der Künstlerkreis Kaiser Maximilians. Anton Schroll, 1923.
- Albrecht Altdorfer. Gallus Verlag, 1941
- Hans Memling. Anton Schroll, 1942
- Conrad Laib und die beiden Rueland Frueauf. Anton Schroll, 1946
- Jan van Eyck. Phaidon Press, 1952
- Hieronymus Bosch. Anton Schroll, 1943 (translation, Abrams, 1960)
- Giorgione. Anton Scholl, 1964 (translation, Thames & Hudson posthumously 1965)
