= Olelbis =

Deity in Wintun mythology

Olelbis (meaning "he who is above") is the creator deity in Wintun mythology. His antagonist is Sedit.

== Mythology ==
According to the mythology of the Wintum tribe, Olelbis desired for the members of the human race to live together as brothers and sisters; that there should be no birth and no death, that life should be agreeable and easy, and that the purpose of life should be rejoining Olelbis in heaven to live with him for all eternity. To satisfy the hunger of the human body, Olelbis created a species of nut which has no shell and falls off the tree when it is ripe (this species of nut or fruit is still a staple item of the Wintum's diet).

Olelbis ordered two brothers to build a paved road from earth to heaven to facilitate the tribe's reunion with their creator. However, his antagonist Sedit interfered and persuaded one of the brothers that it would be better to engage in sexual intercourse and procreate the human species. This brother subsequently persuaded the other into agreement, so that both defected from Olelbis and joined together to destroy the road they were building to heaven. Sedit, horrified when he realised he had brought death to the human race and must himself die, tried to escape his fate and fly to heaven using a machine made of boughs and leaves, before crashing to his death. Olelbis looked down from heaven and said: "See. The first death! From henceforth (all) men shall die."
