= María Dolores Miró =

Spanish painter and art historian (1930–2004)

María Dolores Miró Juncosa (17 July 1930 in Palma de Mallorca – 26 December 2004) was a Spanish painter, art historian and patron of the arts. She is best remembered for her landscape paintings and the cataloguing and management of her father Joan Miró's work and estate.

== Biography ==
She was born in Palma de Mallorca on 17 July 1930, as the only child of the painter Joan Miró and his wife Pilar Juncosa Iglesias (1904-1995).

She was the honorary president and ex officio member of the boards of trustees of the Fundació Joan Miró, in Barcelona, and the Fundació Pilar i Joan Miró in Mallorca. These centres have been responsible for the dissemination and study of the work of Miró, and also for becoming places for experimentation and exhibition of contemporary art.

She continued the patronage, commitment and solidarity of her father, becoming a patron of the arts.

Dolores Miró Juncosa spent part of her childhood in Paris, since because to the Spanish Civil War, in 1936, the Miró family took refuge in Paris, in 1937. When the Nazi invasion of France took place, in 1940, her Miró family moved to the French countryside.

Around the 1950s, the family returned to Mallorca. She was married to David Fernández (1926–1964), and she had two sons from their marriage, David (1955–1991) and Emilio (1958–2012). Dolores' husband died in Mallorca, aged only 38 years old, making her a widow at a young age. She lost her oldest son, David Fernández Miró, poet, translator and music editor, in 1991, also at a very young age.

She died in Palma de Mallorca, on December 26, 2004, due to a heart attack, suffered after a scheduled hip operation. She was cremated in Palma de Mallorca, and her ashes where placed near those of her parents.
