= Barbara Weil =

American painter

- Born: 1933; Chicago, Illinois
- Died: January 19, 2018 (aged 84–85); Mallorca, Spain
- Known for: Painting
- Website: studioweil.com

Barbara Weil (1933 in Chicago, Illinois – 19 January 2018 in Port de Andratx, Mallorca) was an artist from the United States, who showed relationships between painting, sculpture, contemporary architecture and the human being in unusual ways in her work. In collaboration with Daniel Libeskind, she created the architecturally significant Studio Weil in Majorca. The building contains work and exhibition spaces of the artist.

== Life ==
Weil was raised in Chicago. She attended Roosevelt University and the School of the Art Institute of Chicago. While raising a family, she also lived and worked in Southern California, later moving permanently to Majorca, Spain. There she died after a short illness on January 19, 2018.

== Work ==
At first glance, her paintings appear to be American abstract expressionism, though of another kind than the New York School. In fact, at the Art Institute of Chicago, Weil studied the shape and color theory of the Bauhaus. Closer examination reveals further perspectives: references to other styles of art, including figurative art, as well as challenging references to classical art themes, such as love and the female body. While ancient and contemporary mythologies of femininity are questioned as stories, they are interpreted as a series of rich signs (as in the cycle "Mythology of the Moon” and the work "Super Woman - Back to the Womb"). Weil also painted self-portraits.

The artist uses both intuition and reason in her process of deconstruction. Weil takes categories of painting, sculpture and architecture; converts them into unexpected forms, mostly of abstract expressionism and even newer art styles. Consistently new interactions are created. For example, painting with primary colors becomes perspectivistic spatial installation – one generation of sculptures reminds the viewer of two-dimensional cutouts of paintings; others were developed from materials such as cardboard and paper, which represent two-dimensionality. Keeping ironic distance from art styles, from traditional art production and from established interpretations of art, that what is usually considered separate is blended into an œuvre which sets everything in mental, and sometimes even physical motion.

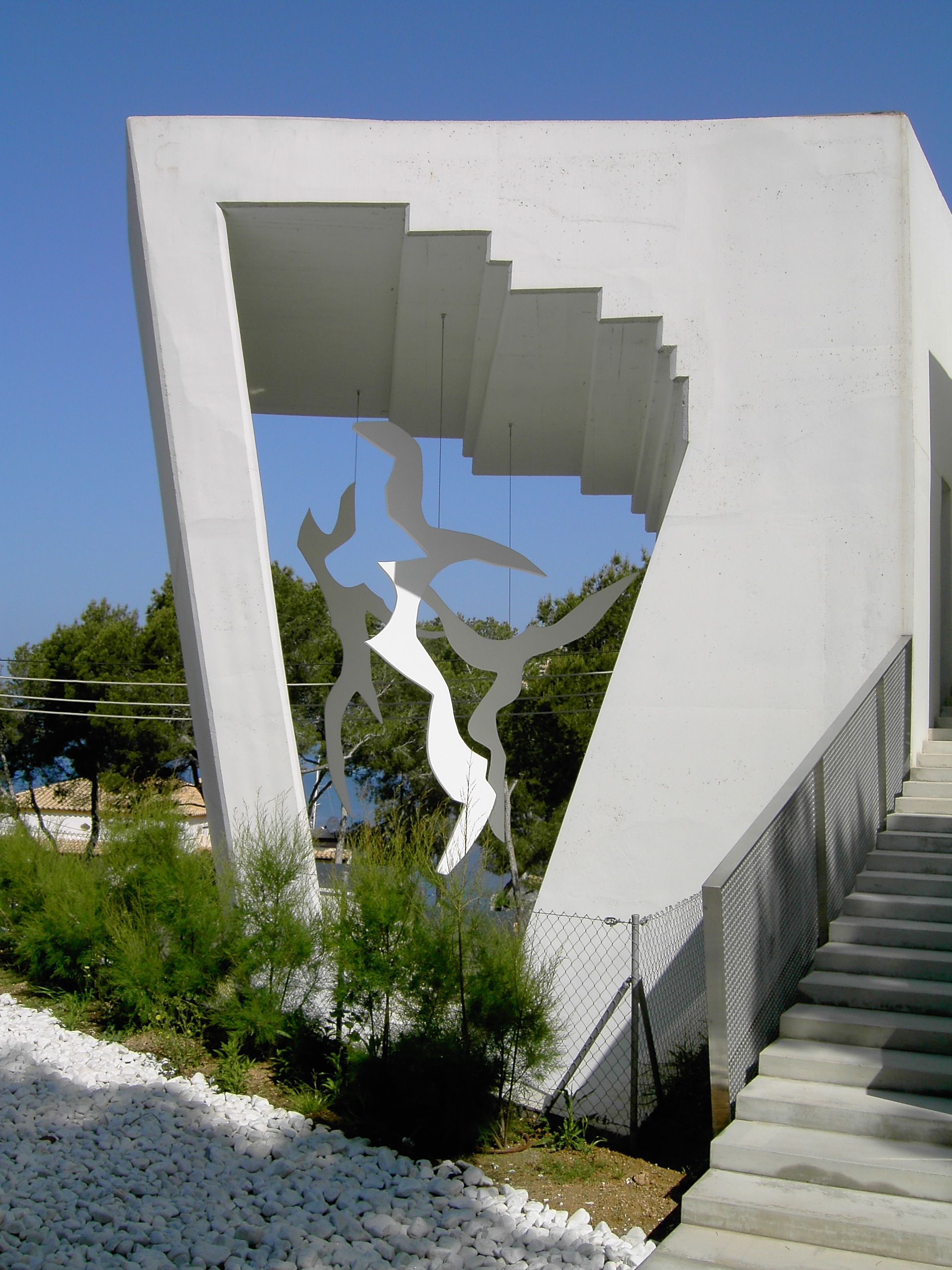
Three Sculptures (2003) as components of the architecture of Studio Weil. Complete view of the studio

A novel blend of art and architecture is constituted by three mobile sculptures, set into motion by the sea breeze that blows through an open gallery cut through the studio building.

== Studio Weil ==
Following the architectural forms found in her painting, Weil embarked on a series of fiberglass sculptures in 1979.

In 1998, Weil was planning to build a studio when she met the architect Daniel Libeskind. The shared intuition of the architect and the artist resulted in a unique studio space where Weil's art is the inspiration for Libeskind's design. Jonathan Glancey, a well-known architectural critic, mentions Weil and Libeskind as "two artists who, unknowingly, had shared something like a common approach to visual form long before Libeskind became news."

Circles had been an important base of Weil's artistic gesture already in earlier works. Libeskinds involvement with the system of concentric circles, which the philosopher Ramon Llull of Majorca had conceived as an explanation of the world, proved to be the ideal complement.

Giles Worsley, in an article "Beauty without Tears", quoted Libeskind, comparing his Studio Weil project with his large buildings: "It's a meditation on art. As opposed to composing a symphony, it's an unaccompanied cello sonata." In the size of a compact museum, the studio permanently exhibits works of Barbara Weil. Construction of the studio was completed in 2003.

== Sculptures in public and in collections ==
- Under the Moon, 3m, painted iron sculpture. Part of the XIV Seville Expo '92. Since 2006 at the Museum of Contemporary Art of Andalusia in Monasterio de la Cartuja. Seville, Spain
- Allegro, 3.5m, marine plywood autolacquered. Originally installed at Verbier Festival 2002. Verbier, Suisse
- Siurell de Libertad, 3m, autolaquered fiberglass. Since 1998 at Conservatorio de Musica Andratx. Andratx, Majorca, Spain
- Over the Moon, 4m, autolaquered fiberglass. Since 1995 at Paseo Maritimo, Puerto de Andratx. Andratx, Majorca, Spain
- City of the Big Shoulders temporary installation of 11 polyurethane paint on fiberglass hanging sculptures and one polyurethane on fiberglass standing sculpture. 1993 at Three Illinois Center. Chicago, Illinois. See Catalogue. Works of the installation since 1993 at Archeworks Stanley Tigerman. Chicago, Illinois:
- Female sculpture 3.50m, wall sculpture
- Male sculpture 2.40m, wall sculpture
- So Is She, 140 cm, standing sculpture

== Literature ==
- Mnemonic cartwheels: Daniel Libeskind's Studio Weil and the work of Barbara Weil, exhibition catalog. Kristin Feireiss (Author), Kristin and Hans-Jürgen Feireiss Commerell (ed.). Berlin: Aedes West, 2000.
