= Éric Sandillon =

French visual artist (born 1969)

- Born: 1969 (age 56–57); France
- Known for: Photography, Textile art

Éric Sandillon, born in 1969, is a French visual artist, filmmaker, and applied arts teacher.

== Biography ==
He was born in 1969 and currently resides in Paris. Sandillon holds a degree in applied arts. In 1998, he exhibited his works at the Gallerie van Gelder in Amsterdam. In 1999, he was considered part of an avant-garde of artists fighting then for recognition within the French artistic circles, akin to Paola Salerno or George Dupin.

In 2002, he showcased a collection of photographs at the Galerie Martine et Thibault de la Châtre in the 3rd arrondissement of Paris. This collection was titled "Marianne dévoilée" and focused, among other things, on the social commitment of youth. Sandillon exhibited in Halle, Germany, in 2004. In 2005, he published "Projet louche" with Gallimard, a synthesis of his work. During the same year, he exhibited alongside Agnès Varda and Michelangelo Pistoletto, presenting his work "L'allergie," with the central piece being an animated film he directed. In 2006, Sandillon presented a giant table at the arts meeting in Thevet-Saint-Julien. He was exhibited at the Salon du Dessin Contemporain in 2008.

In 2011, one of his tapestries was displayed in the Dauphin's Chamber at the Palace of Versailles. He was also exhibited as part of the 'News' exhibition in Caen.

He teaches Digital and 3D at the École nationale supérieure des arts appliqués et des métiers d'art (ENSAAMA). In 2016, he participated in the study day "Critique du réseau" at the National Institute of Art History (INHA).

In 2017, his tapestry "Sans limite de stock" was exhibited at the Beauvais Manufactory during the European Heritage Days. The Fonds régional d'art contemporain (FRAC) and the Mobilier National both possess a portion of his works.

In 2018, he was exhibited alongside, among others, Henri Matisse, Joan Miró, Le Corbusier, and Raymond Hains at the Museum of Decorative Arts and Design in Riga, Latvia. This exhibition, titled "Colour of Gobelins: Contemporary Gobelins from the 'Mobilier national' collection in France," took place during the sixth edition of the Riga Textile Art.

== Analysis of the work ==
Eric Sandillon's body of work is characterized by a focus on clothing and the utilization of garments as a platform for disseminating information. One of his pieces, "Sans limite de stock," is emblematic of the integration of computer technology into art during the 2000s and delves into emerging technologies such as cloning, with, notably, an allusion to Dolly. In this context, Louis Surreaux stated:

"In Eric Sandillon's work, 'Sans limite de stock,' the image with vibrant colors alludes to genetic manipulation, the creation of a new life form by human hands. [...] The flat, colorful drawings are translated into pixelated forms, as if originating from the realm of computers. [...] The use of vivid colors situates this tapestry within the realm of advertising panels, an ultimate means of communication."

For Virginie Mouzat, Sandillon reveals the era through the 'appearance, the intense' by using advertising slogans as a tool of protest.

== Works ==
=== Books ===
- Projet Louche, 2005, Paris.
