= Fundació Pilar i Joan Miró in Mallorca =

Art museum and foundation in Spain

Coordinates: 39.555084°N 2.610067°E

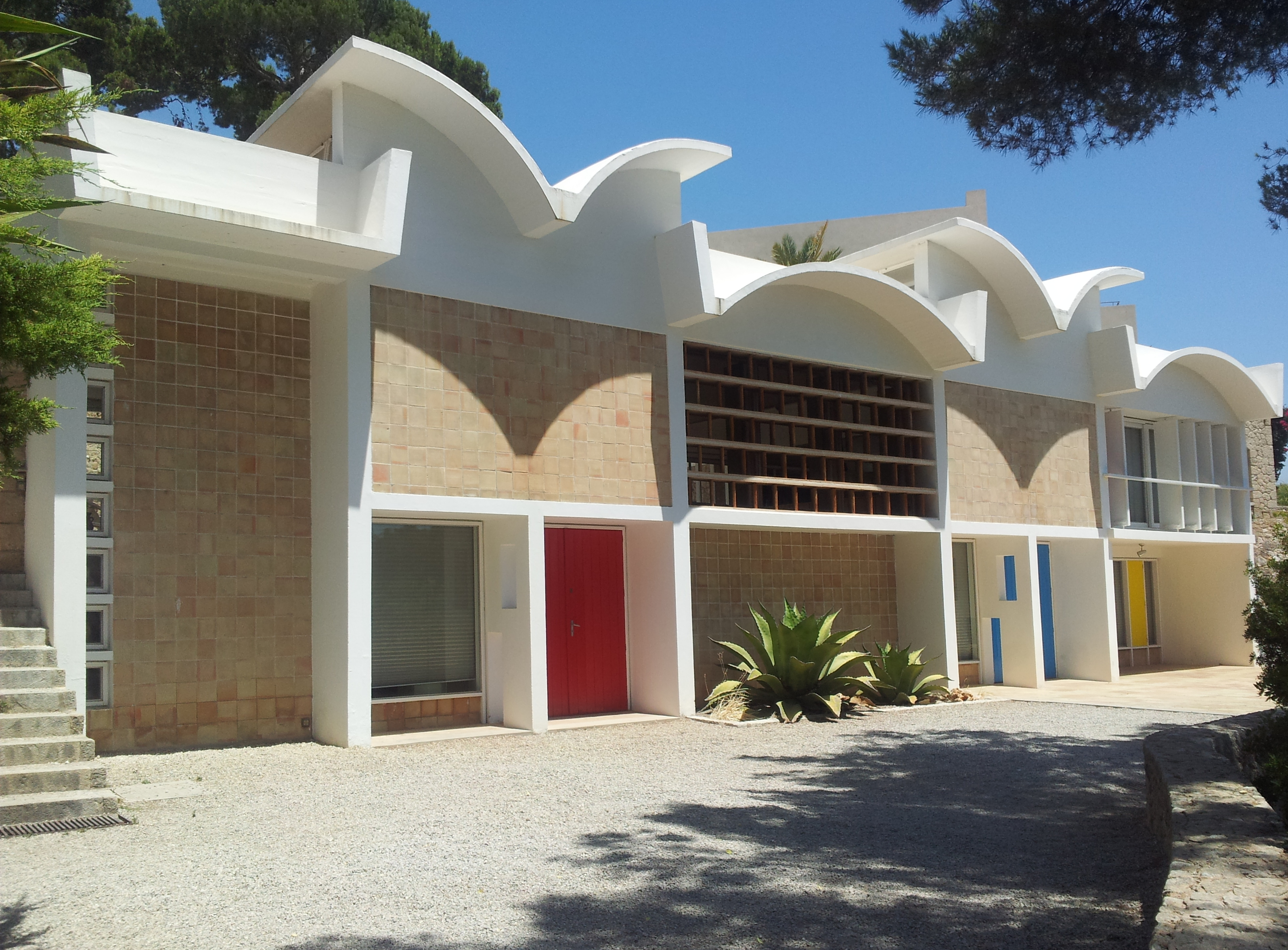
- Miró's Studio Sert
- Established: 1992
- Location: Palma de Mallorca
- Director: Antònia Maria Perelló Ferrer
- Website: www.miromallorca.com

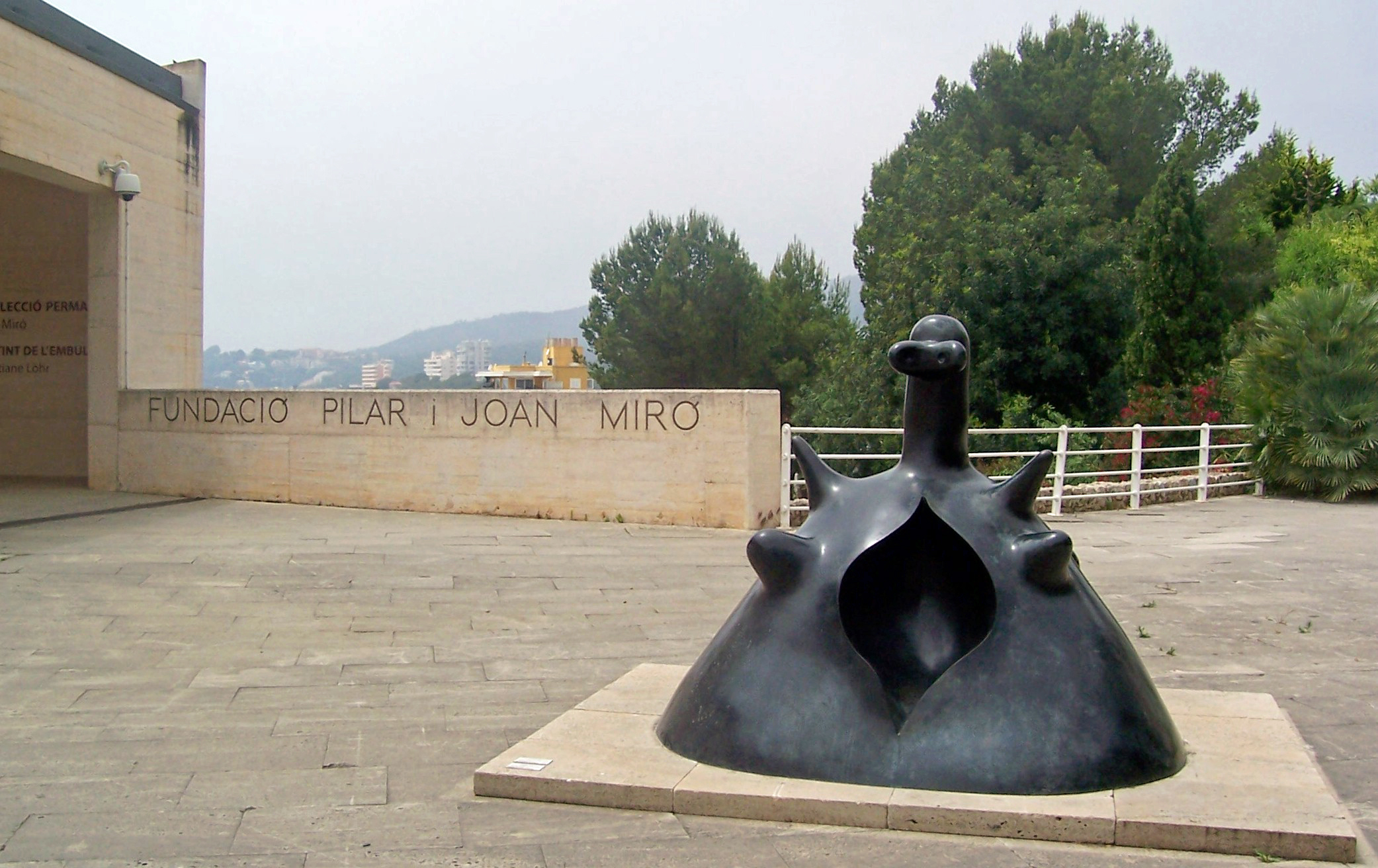
Miró sculpture near the entrance of the museum

The Fundació Pilar i Joan Miró in Mallorca (English: Pilar and Joan Miró Mallorca Foundation) is a museum in Palma de Mallorca, dedicated to the work of the artist Joan Miró. It comprises a main building exhibiting 6000 works donated by the artist, including paintings, sculptures, drawings, sketches, a library, a sculpture garden, and Miró's former studios Sert and Son Boter.

The complex is located near Son Abrines, Miró's private residence since 1956, and includes his first workshop, Son Boter, adapted to a traditional house, and the second, larger workshop, built by the architect Josep Lluís Sert, a personal friend. Various sculptures and murals can be seen in the gardens. The studio Sert was used by the artist until his death in 1983. In 1959, Miró bought the nearby Finca Son Boter which he also used as an atelier; his graffiti on the walls can still be seen there. The foundation was created in 1981 by Joan Miró and his wife Pilar Juncosa. In 1992, the museum building, a work of Rafael Moneo, was added to house the administrative services and present the artist's works on a rotating basis. The foundation also organizes temporary exhibitions.

== History ==
Miró, throughout his life, had several links with Mallorca. A son of Mallorcans, he married Mallorcan Pilar Juncosa in 1929. Between 1940 and 1943, during the World War II, the couple lived on the island. In 1955, they decided to settle there permanently.

The couple bought some land on the outskirts of Palma de Mallorca, now integrated into the urban fabric. Miró asked his friend, the architect Josep Lluís Sert, to build him a studio workshop so he could work there. Later he also bought the nearby estate of Son Boter. The couple would live in the Son Abrines estate, currently closed to the public and for private use.

In 1981, Miró reached an agreement with the Palma City Council to transfer part of his work to create a Foundation on the island. The agreement would not be made public, however, until 1992, when the entity was formally created.

To celebrate the 25th anniversary, in 2017, the Fundació Pilar i Joan Miró organized the "Miró mai vist" exhibition, which would have 32,000 visitors during the six months it lasted. The Foundation also created a new logo and a new corporate brand, Fundació Miró Mallorca. In 2017, they had 57,640 visitors, 85% of whom were international.

== Buildings ==
The Foundation is divided into three main areas:

- Moneo Building: a work by Rafael Moneo, created after the artist's death, with the purpose of being the Foundation's exhibition space.
- Sert Workshop: a building commissioned by Joan Miró from Josep Lluís Sert.
- Son Boter: typical Mallorcan house from the 18th century acquired by Miró in 1959 with the purpose of being the studio where he would work on his largest artworks.

== Collection ==
The Foundation's collection was created with an offer by the artist, made on March 7, 1981, who donated both the buildings and a series of paintings, drawings, sculptures and graphic works, and also an important documentary fund. The purpose of the donation was to offer an area of 4,000 m² of land, consisting of the Son Abrines estate and the graphic workshop of Son Boter, to turn them both into a center for cultural activities after his death.

The collection of the Foundation consists of several artworks by Miró: 118 paintings on canvas, 275 works of mixed media, 1512 drawings and 35 sculptures. There are also more than 700 pieces of graphic art. These artworks were created between 1908 and 1981, although the great majority of them are from the 1960s or later. This donation to the Palma City Council wasn't made public until 1992.

The museum collection also includes works by other artists related to or friends of Joan Miró, including Marc Chagall, Eduardo Chillida, Antonio Saura, Antoni Tàpies and Wolf Vostell, among others.

== Documentary fund ==
The Foundation has a documentary archive containing Miró's correspondence, a newspaper library, a collection of photographs, and books from the painter's personal library, among other content. There are around 800 letters, 5,000 documents in the newspaper library and some of the books from Miró's library.

== Library ==
The Foundation has a library specialized in contemporary art and, above all, in the personality and everything related to Miró. It consists of more than 17,000 documents, and is in constant growth.

== See also ==
- List of single-artist museums
- Fundació Joan Miró, Barcelona
