= Siurell =

Mallorcan cultural object

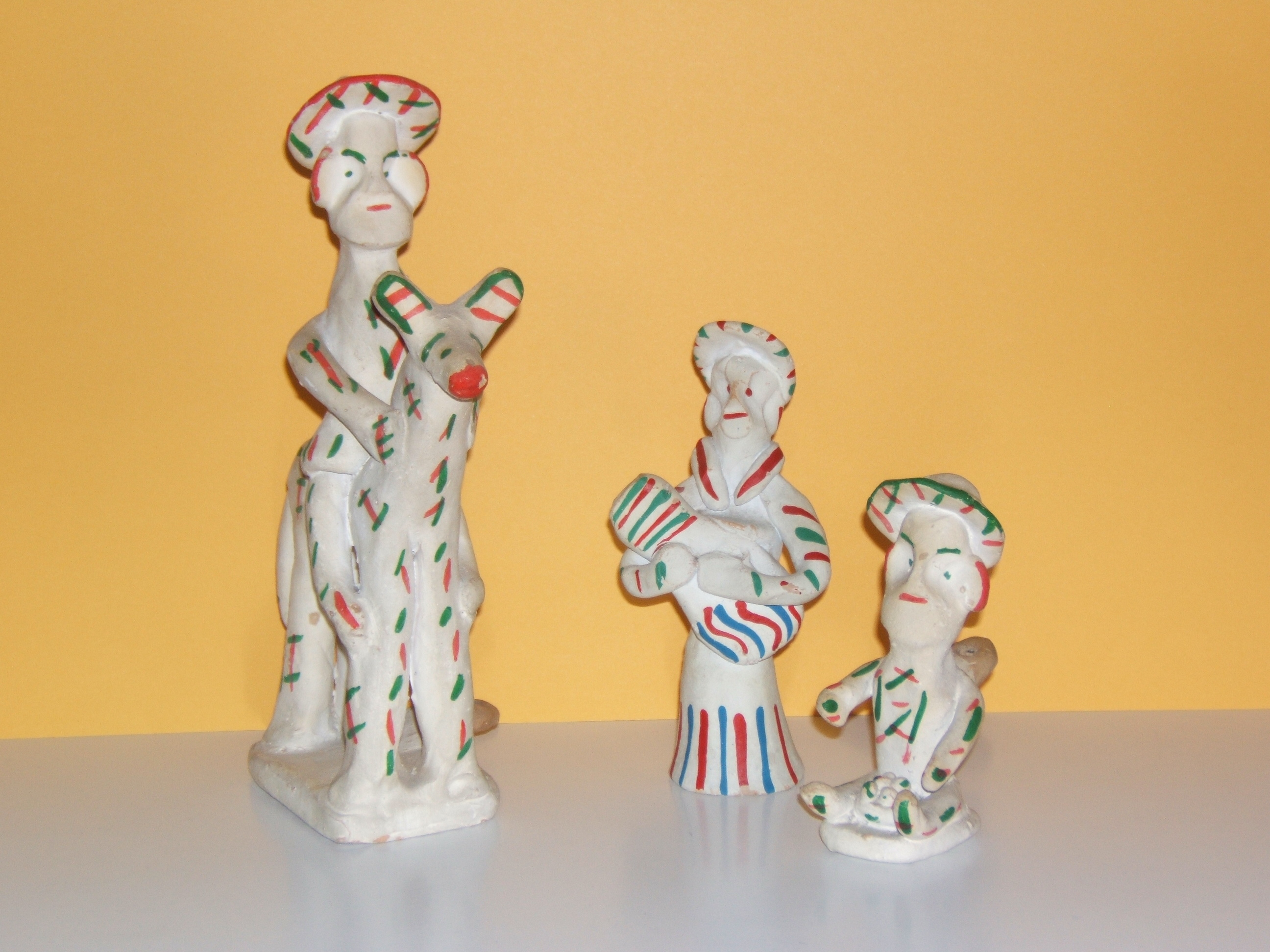
Three typical siurells.

A siurell (Catalan pronunciation: [siuɾeʎ]) is a traditional clay whistling figurine from Mallorca, Spain. Although there are similar figurines found in Sardinia, Ibiza, and Crete, their origin remains unknown. They are generally made of clay and whitewashed with lime.

== Description ==
Siurells are typically small, white, green, and red anthropomorphic figurines with a whistle. However, the forms that siurells can take are varied: from fantastic, pseudo-mythical and mysterious figures such as animals, giants, demons and dwarfs, to contemporary, everyday figures such as motorcycles, air planes, and soccer players.

They typically are a few inches tall, although they can range from 3 inches to 3 feet in size.

== Cultural Significance ==
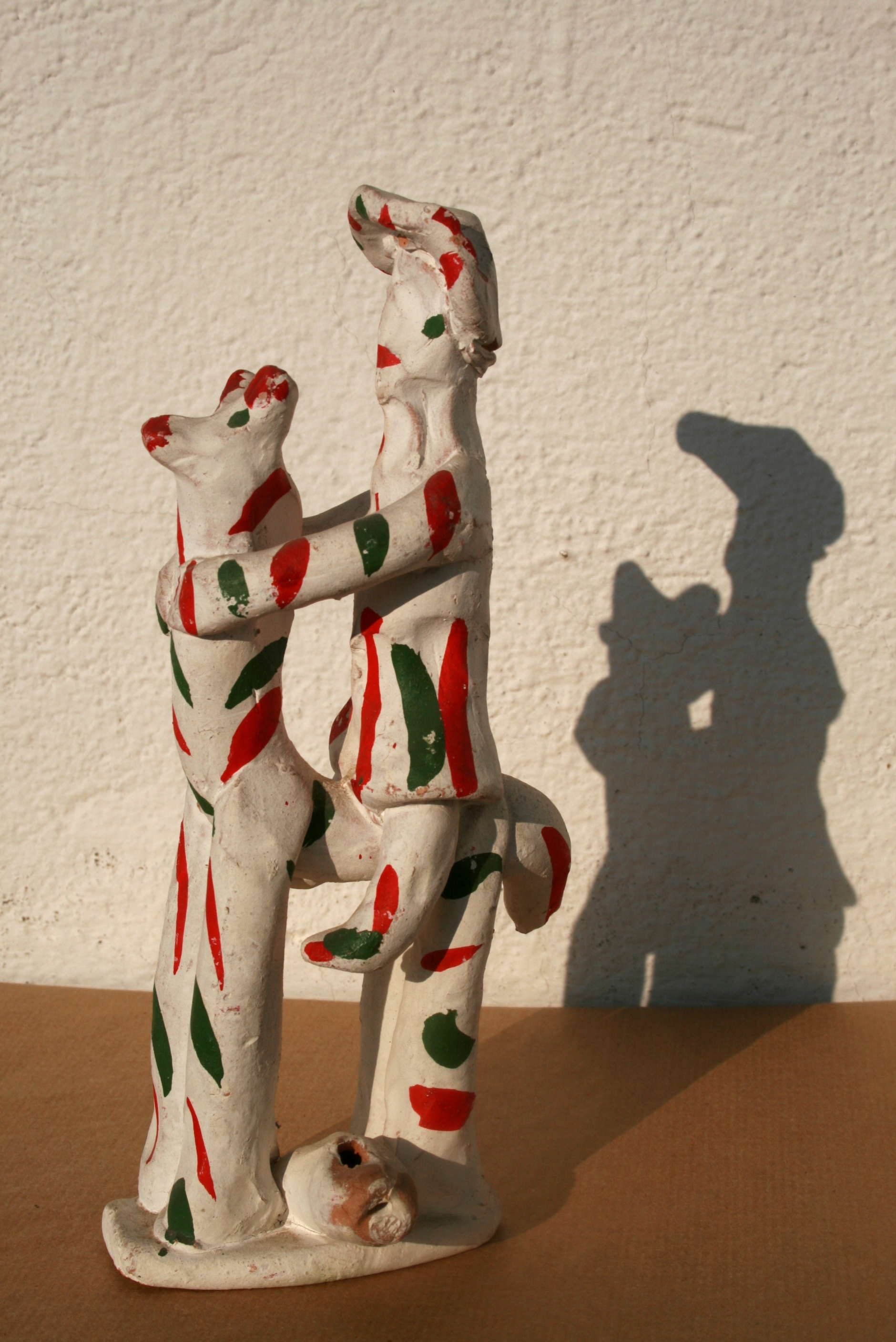
A siurell of a man on a horse. The whistle can be seen between the horse's legs.

As an instrument, siurells were used by ranchers and shepherds to control their herds and even to compose songs which survive in some Mallorcan folk dances.

Ethnographer Guadalupe González-Hontoria noted the use of the verb "siular" in specific market contexts. Specifically, she documented that older family members would say "tu siularás" (or in Catalan, "tu siularàs") and "tu no siularás/siularàs" to children upon departing for the market. According to González-Hontoria, this salutation would indicate whether or not the child had been given pocket money, with the affirmative indicating that money had been given and the negative indicating not.

Joan Miró is quoted as having said "I observe [siurells] constantly. Each figure has its own physiognomy, even though they’re made in their hundreds. They’re very popular, especially among children... For me these dolls have an extraordinary importance, look at the expressivity of the face and the posture."
