= List of NGC objects (7001–7840) =

This is a list of NGC objects 7001–7840 from the New General Catalogue (NGC). The astronomical catalogue is composed mainly of star clusters, nebulae, and galaxies. Other objects in the catalogue can be found in the other subpages of the list of NGC objects.

The constellation information in these tables is taken from The Complete New General Catalogue and Index Catalogue of Nebulae and Star Clusters by J. L. E. Dreyer, which was accessed using the "VizieR Service". Galaxy types are identified using the NASA/IPAC Extragalactic Database. The other data of these tables are from the SIMBAD Astronomical Database unless otherwise stated.

== 7001–7100 ==
| NGC number | Other names | Object type | Constellation | Right ascension (J2000) | Declination (J2000) | Apparent magnitude |
|---|---|---|---|---|---|---|
| 7001 | | Intermediate spiral galaxy | Aquarius | 21^{h} 01^{m} 07.7^{s} | −00° 11′ 41″ | 13.5 |
| 7002 | | Elliptical galaxy, radio galaxy | Indus | 21^{h} 03^{m} 45^{s} | −49° 01′ 45″ | 12.4 |
| 7003 | | Spiral galaxy | Delphinus | 21^{h} 00^{m} 42.3^{s} | +17° 48′ 17″ | 13 |
| 7004 | | Lenticular galaxy | Indus | 21^{h} 04^{m} 02^{s} | −49° 06′ 51″ | 13.1 |
| 7005 | | Open cluster | Aquarius | 21^{h} 01^{m} 57^{s} | −12° 52′ 48″ | |
| 7006 | | Globular cluster | Delphinus | 21^{h} 01^{m} 29.5^{s} | +16° 11′ 17″ | 10.6 |
| 7007 | | Lenticular galaxy | Indus | 21^{h} 05^{m} 27.8^{s} | −52° 33′ 07″ | 11.9 |
| 7008 | | Planetary nebula | Cygnus | 21^{h} 00^{m} 32.8^{s} | +54° 32′ 38″ | 10.7 |
| 7009 | | Planetary nebula | Aquarius | 21^{h} 04^{m} 10.8^{s} | −11° 21′ 47″ | 8 |
| 7010 | | Elliptical galaxy | Aquarius | 21^{h} 04^{m} 39.4^{s} | −12° 20′ 16″ | 13 |
| 7011 | | Open cluster | Cygnus | 21^{h} 01^{m} 50^{s} | +47° 21′ 17″ | |
| 7012 | | Elliptical galaxy | Microscopium | 21^{h} 06^{m} 45.5^{s} | −44° 48′ 52″ | 12.7 |
| 7013 | | Lenticular galaxy | Cygnus | 21^{h} 03^{m} 33.6^{s} | +29° 53′ 49″ | 11.5 |
| 7014 | | Elliptical galaxy | Indus | 21^{h} 07^{m} 52^{s} | −47° 10′ 43″ | 12.3 |
| 7015 | | Spiral galaxy | Equuleus | 21^{h} 05^{m} 37.3^{s} | +11° 24′ 49″ | 12.4 |
| 7016 | | Elliptical galaxy | Capricornus | 21^{h} 07^{m} 16.2^{s} | −25° 28′ 07″ | 13.7 |
| 7017 | | Galaxy | Capricornus | 21^{h} 07^{m} 20.5^{s} | −25° 29′ 15″ | 14.4 |
| 7018 | | Galaxy | Capricornus | 21^{h} 07^{m} 25.4^{s} | −25° 25′ 45″ | 13.5 |
| 7019 | | Spiral galaxy | Capricornus | 21^{h} 06^{m} 25.8^{s} | −24° 24′ 46″ | 14.1 |
| 7020 | | Barred lenticular galaxy | Pavo | 21^{h} 11^{m} 19.9^{s} | −64° 01′ 31″ | 11.8 |
| 7021 | (Duplicate of NGC 7020) | Barred lenticular galaxy | Pavo | 21^{h} 11^{m} 19.9^{s} | −64° 01′ 31″ | 11.8 |
| 7022 | | Barred lenticular galaxy | Indus | 21^{h} 09^{m} 35.1^{s} | −49° 18′ 13″ | 13 |
| 7023 | Iris Nebula; Caldwell 4 | Reflection nebula | Cepheus | 21^{h} 01^{m} 35.5^{s} | +68° 10′ 10″ | 7.2 |
| 7024 | | Open cluster | Cygnus | 21^{h} 06^{m} 09.1^{s} | +41° 29′ 24″ | |
| 7025 | | Spiral galaxy | Delphinus | 21^{h} 07^{m} 47.4^{s} | +16° 20′ 09″ | 12.9 |
| 7026 | | Planetary nebula | Cygnus | 21^{h} 06^{m} 18.6^{s} | +47° 51′ 10″ | 10.9 |
| 7027 | | Planetary nebula | Cygnus | 21^{h} 07^{m} 01.7^{s} | +42° 14′ 12″ | 8.5 |
| 7028 | | Planetary nebula | Delphinus | 21^{h} 08^{m} 15^{s} | +18° 28′ 48″ | |
| 7029 | | Elliptical galaxy | Indus | 21^{h} 11^{m} 51.7^{s} | −49° 17′ 01″ | 11.4 |
| 7030 | | Barred spiral galaxy | Capricornus | 21^{h} 11^{m} 13.3^{s} | −20° 29′ 12″ | 13.7 |
| 7031 | | Open cluster | Cygnus | 21^{h} 07^{m} 12.5^{s} | +50° 52′ 12″ | 9.1 |
| 7032 | | Spiral galaxy | Pavo | 21^{h} 15^{m} 22.9^{s} | −68° 17′ 15″ | 12.9 |
| 7033 | | Lenticular galaxy | Pegasus | 21^{h} 09^{m} 36.2^{s} | +15° 07′ 31″ | 14.2 |
| 7034 | | Elliptical galaxy | Pegasus | 21^{h} 09^{m} 38.1^{s} | +15° 09′ 04″ | 14 |
| 7035 | | Interacting galaxy | Capricornus | 21^{h} 10^{m} 45.5^{s} | −23° 08′ 07″ | 14.4 |
| 7036 | | Triple star | Pegasus | 21^{h} 10^{m} 12^{s} | +15° 22′ 36″ | |
| 7037 | | Open cluster | Cygnus | 21^{h} 10^{m} 48^{s} | +33° 44′ 48″ | |
| 7038 | | Intermediate spiral galaxy | Indus | 21^{h} 15^{m} 07.5^{s} | −47° 13′ 13″ | 12 |
| 7039 | | Open cluster | Cygnus | 21^{h} 10^{m} 48^{s} | +45° 37′ 00″ | 7.6 |
| 7040 | | Spiral galaxy | Equuleus | 21^{h} 13^{m} 16.5^{s} | +08° 51′ 54″ | 14 |
| 7041 | | Lenticular galaxy | Indus | 21^{h} 16^{m} 32.1^{s} | −48° 21′ 47″ | 11.1 |
| 7042 | | Spiral galaxy | Pegasus | 21^{h} 13^{m} 45.7^{s} | +13° 34′ 30″ | 12 |
| 7043 | | Barred spiral galaxy | Pegasus | 21^{h} 14^{m} 04.2^{s} | +13° 37′ 35″ | 13.8 |
| 7044 | | Open cluster | Cygnus | 21^{h} 13^{m} 09.4^{s} | +42° 29′ 46″ | 12 |
| 7045 | | Double star | Equuleus | 21^{h} 14^{m} 50.3^{s} | +04° 30′ 28″ | |
| 7046 | | Barred spiral galaxy | Equuleus | 21^{h} 14^{m} 56^{s} | +02° 50′ 04″ | 13.2 |
| 7047 | | Intermediate spiral galaxy | Aquarius | 21^{h} 16^{m} 27.4^{s} | −00° 49′ 35″ | 13.4 |
| 7048 | | Planetary nebula | Cygnus | 21^{h} 14^{m} 15.2^{s} | +46° 17′ 21″ | 12.1 |
| 7049 | | Lenticular galaxy | Indus | 21^{h} 19^{m} 00.2^{s} | −48° 33′ 41″ | 10.6 |
| 7050 | | Open cluster | Cygnus | 21^{h} 15^{m} 08^{s} | +36° 10′ 30″ | |
| 7051 | | Barred spiral galaxy | Aquarius | 21^{h} 19^{m} 51.3^{s} | −08° 46′ 57″ | 13 |
| 7052 | | Elliptical galaxy | Vulpecula | 21^{h} 18^{m} 33^{s} | +26° 26′ 50″ | 12.6 |
| 7053 | | Spiral galaxy | Pegasus | 21^{h} 21^{m} 07.5^{s} | +23° 05′ 07″ | 13.1 |
| 7054 | Doesn't exist | Unknown | Cygnus | 21^{h} 20^{m} 43.5^{s} | +39° 10′ 18″ | |
| 7055 | | Open cluster | Cepheus | 21^{h} 19^{m} 30^{s} | +57° 34′ 12″ | |
| 7056 | | Barred spiral galaxy | Pegasus | 21^{h} 22^{m} 07.5^{s} | +18° 39′ 56″ | 13.1 |
| 7057 | | Elliptical galaxy | Microscopium | 21^{h} 24^{m} 58.5^{s} | −42° 27′ 37″ | 12.7 |
| 7058 | | Open cluster | Cygnus | 21^{h} 21^{m} 00^{s} | +50° 48′ 30″ | |
| 7059 | | Spiral galaxy | Pavo | 21^{h} 27^{m} 21.7^{s} | −60° 00′ 53″ | 11.8 |
| 7060 | | Intermediate spiral galaxy | Microscopium | 21^{h} 25^{m} 53.5^{s} | −42° 24′ 39″ | 12.8 |
| 7061 | | Elliptical galaxy | Indus | 21^{h} 27^{m} 26.7^{s} | −49° 03′ 48″ | 13.1 |
| 7062 | | Open cluster | Cygnus | 21^{h} 23^{m} 27.4^{s} | +46° 22′ 43″ | 8.3 |
| 7063 | | Open cluster | Cygnus | 21^{h} 24^{m} 22^{s} | +36° 29′ 12″ | 7 |
| 7064 | | Barred spiral galaxy | Indus | 21^{h} 29^{m} 03.2^{s} | −52° 46′ 02″ | 12.2 |
| 7065 | | Barred spiral galaxy | Aquarius | 21^{h} 26^{m} 42.2^{s} | −06° 59′ 41″ | 13.7 |
| 7066 | | Spiral galaxy | Pegasus | 21^{h} 26^{m} 13.7^{s} | +14° 10′ 59″ | 14.2 |
| 7067 | | Open cluster | Cygnus | 21^{h} 24^{m} 24^{s} | +48° 00′ 36″ | 9.7 |
| 7068 | | Spiral galaxy | Pegasus | 21^{h} 26^{m} 32.3^{s} | +12° 11′ 04″ | 14 |
| 7069 | | Lenticular galaxy | Aquarius | 21^{h} 28^{m} 05.8^{s} | −01° 38′ 47″ | 13.5 |
| 7070 | | Spiral galaxy | Grus | 21^{h} 30^{m} 25.2^{s} | −43° 05′ 12″ | 12.1 |
| 7071 | | Open cluster | Cygnus | 21^{h} 26^{m} 40^{s} | +47° 55′ 22″ | |
| 7072 | | Intermediate spiral galaxy | Grus | 21^{h} 30^{m} 37^{s} | −43° 09′ 09″ | 13.6 |
| 7073 | | Spiral galaxy | Capricornus | 21^{h} 29^{m} 26^{s} | −11° 29′ 19″ | 13.7 |
| 7074 | | Lenticular galaxy | Pegasus | 21^{h} 29^{m} 38.8^{s} | +06° 40′ 56″ | 14.5 |
| 7075 | | Elliptical galaxy | Grus | 21^{h} 31^{m} 32.9^{s} | −38° 37′ 05″ | 12.8 |
| 7076 | | Planetary nebula | Cepheus | 21^{h} 26^{m} 24.1^{s} | +62° 53′ 30″ | 13.5 |
| 7077 | | Blue compact dwarf galaxy | Aquarius | 21^{h} 29^{m} 59.5^{s} | +02° 24′ 53″ | 13 |
| 7078 | Messier 15 | Globular cluster | Pegasus | 21^{h} 29^{m} 58.3^{s} | +12° 10′ 03″ | 6.3 |
| 7079 | | Barred lenticular galaxy | Grus | 21^{h} 32^{m} 35^{s} | −44° 04′ 03″ | 11.5 |
| 7080 | | Barred spiral galaxy | Vulpecula | 21^{h} 30^{m} 01.9^{s} | +26° 43′ 06″ | 12.4 |
| 7081 | | Spiral galaxy | Aquarius | 21^{h} 31^{m} 24.3^{s} | +02° 29′ 28″ | 12.8 |
| 7082 | | Open cluster | Cygnus | 21^{h} 29^{m} 17^{s} | +47° 07′ 36″ | 7.2 |
| 7083 | | Unbarred spiral galaxy | Indus | 21^{h} 35^{m} 44.6^{s} | −63° 54′ 12″ | 11.1 |
| 7084 | Doesn't exist | Unknown | Pegasus | 21^{h} 32^{m} 33^{s} | +17° 30′ 30″ | |
| 7085 | | Spiral galaxy | Pegasus | 21^{h} 32^{m} 25.1^{s} | +06° 34′ 54″ | 14.5 |
| 7086 | | Open cluster | Cygnus | 21^{h} 30^{m} 27.5^{s} | +51° 36′ 02″ | 8.4 |
| 7087 | | Barred spiral galaxy | Grus | 21^{h} 34^{m} 33.4^{s} | −40° 49′ 06″ | 12.9 |
| 7088 | Doesn't exist | Unknown | Aquarius | 21^{h} 33^{m} 22^{s} | −00° 23′ 00″ | |
| 7089 | Messier 2 | Globular cluster | Aquarius | 21^{h} 33^{m} 27.2^{s} | −00° 49′ 22″ | 6.6 |
| 7090 | | Spiral galaxy | Indus | 21^{h} 36^{m} 27.7^{s} | −54° 33′ 18″ | 10.7 |
| 7091 | | Galaxy | Grus | 21^{h} 34^{m} 07.7^{s} | −36° 39′ 14″ | 12.8 |
| 7092 | | Open cluster | Cygnus | 21^{h} 31^{m} 42^{s} | +48° 25′ 00″ | 4.6 |
| 7093 | | Open cluster | Cygnus | 21^{h} 34^{m} 21^{s} | +45° 57′ 56″ | |
| 7094 | | Planetary nebula | Pegasus | 21^{h} 36^{m} 53^{s} | +12° 47′ 22″ | 13.4 |
| 7095 | | Barred spiral galaxy | Octans | 21^{h} 52^{m} 24.8^{s} | −81° 31′ 53″ | 11.4 |
| 7096 | | Grand design spiral galaxy | Indus | 21^{h} 41^{m} 19.1^{s} | −63° 54′ 30″ | 11.9 |
| 7097 | | Galaxy | Grus | 21^{h} 40^{m} 12.8^{s} | −42° 32′ 21″ | 11.6 |
| 7098 | | Barred spiral galaxy | Octans | 21^{h} 44^{m} 16^{s} | −75° 06′ 39″ | 11.3 |
| 7099 | Messier 30 | Globular cluster | Capricornus | 21^{h} 40^{m} 22^{s} | −23° 10′ 43″ | 6.9 |
| 7100 | | Star | Pegasus | 21^{h} 39^{m} 06.9^{s} | +08° 57′ 02″ | |

== 7101–7200 ==
| NGC number | Other names | Object type | Constellation | Right ascension (J2000) | Declination (J2000) | Apparent magnitude |
|---|---|---|---|---|---|---|
| 7101 | | Elliptical galaxy | Pegasus | 21^{h} 39^{m} 34.6127^{s} | +08° 52′ 36.832″ | 14.7 |
| 7110 | | Barred spiral galaxy | Piscis Austrinus | 21^{h} 42^{m} 12.15^{s} | −34° 09′ 44.0″ | 13.2 |
| 7114 | Q Cygni | Star | Cygnus | 21^{h} 41^{m} 43.928^{s} | 42° 50′ 29.04″ | 15.6 |
| 7124 | | Spiral galaxy | Indus | 21^{h} 48^{m} 05.39^{s} | −50° 33′ 54.8″ | 12.3 |
| 7129 | | Open cluster | Cepheus | 21^{h} 42^{m} 56^{s} | +66° 06′ | 11.5 |
| 7130 | IC 5135 | Spiral galaxy | Piscis Austrinus | 21^{h} 48^{m} 19.5^{s} | −34° 57′ 04″ | 12.1 |
| 7139 | | Planetary nebula | Cepheus | 21^{h} 46^{m} 08^{s} | +63° 47′ 29.45″ | 13.3 |
| 7142 | | Open cluster | Cepheus | 21^{h} 45^{m} 09^{s} | +65° 46′ 30″ | 10.4 |
| 7154 | | Barred spiral galaxy | Piscis Austrinus | 21^{h} 55^{m} 21.1700^{s} | −34° 48′ 51.697″ | 13.14 |
| 7160 | | Open cluster | Cepheus | 21^{h} 53^{m} 40^{s} | +62° 36′ 12″ | 6.1 |
| 7171 | | Barred spiral galaxy | Aquarius | 22^{h} 01^{m} 02.01^{s} | −13° 16′ 11.1″ | 12.2 |
| 7172 | | Spiral galaxy | Piscis Austrinus | 22^{h} 02^{m} 01.9^{s} | −31° 52′ 11″ | 11.9 |
| 7177 | | Barred spiral galaxy | Pegasus | 22^{h} 00^{m} 41.2099^{s} | +17° 44′ 16.638″ | 11.2 |
| 7184 | | Barred spiral galaxy | Aquarius | 22^{h} 02^{m} 39.8^{s} | −20° 48′ 46″ | 11.1 |
| 7190 | | Lenticular galaxy | Pegasus | 22^{h} 03^{m} 06.6^{s} | +11° 11′ 59″ | 13.9 |
| 7191 | | Spiral galaxy | Indus | 22^{h} 06^{m} 52.8^{s} | −64° 38′ 04″ | 13.1 |
| 7196 | | Elliptical galaxy | Indus | 22^{h} 05^{m} 54.8^{s} | −50° 07′ 10″ | 11.4 |
| 7199 | | Barred spiral galaxy | Indus | 22^{h} 08^{m} 30.1^{s} | −64° 42′ 22″ | 13.2 |

== 7201–7300 ==
| NGC number | Other names | Object type | Constellation | Right ascension (J2000) | Declination (J2000) | Apparent magnitude |
|---|---|---|---|---|---|---|
| 7205 | | Spiral galaxy | Indus | 22^{h} 08^{m} 34.3225^{s} | −57° 26′ 33.354″ | 10.8 |
| 7209 | | Open cluster | Lacerta | 22^{h} 05^{m} 07^{s} | +46° 29′ 00″ | 7.7 |
| 7213 | | Lenticular galaxy | Grus | 22^{h} 09^{m} 16.3^{s} | −47° 09′ 59″ | 10.1 |
| 7217 | | Spiral galaxy | Pegasus | 22^{h} 07^{m} 52.6^{s} | +31° 21′ 33″ | 11.0 |
| 7222 | | Barred spiral galaxy | Aquarius | 22^{h} 10^{m} 51.760^{s} | +02° 06′ 20.87″ | 14.59 |
| 7236 | | Lenticular galaxy | Pegasus | 22^{h} 14^{m} 45.0^{s} | +13° 50′ 47″ | 13.6 |
| 7237 | | Lenticular galaxy | Pegasus | 22^{h} 14^{m} 46.9^{s} | +13° 50′ 27″ | 13.9 |
| 7243 | | Open cluster | Lacerta | 22^{h} 15^{m} 08.6^{s} | +49° 53′ 51″ | 6.4 |
| 7248 | | Lenticular galaxy | Lacerta | 22^{h} 16^{m} 52.6^{s} | +40° 30′ 16″ | 12.4 |
| 7250 | | Irregular galaxy | Lacerta | 22^{h} 18^{m} 17.776^{s} | +40° 33′ 44.66″ | 12.58 |
| 7252 | Atoms for Peace Galaxy | Lenticular galaxy | Aquarius | 22^{h} 20^{m} 44.8^{s} | −24° 40′ 42″ | 12.7 |
| 7253 | | Interacting galaxies | Pegasus | 22^{h} 19^{m} 28.9^{s} | 29° 23′ 30.0″ | 13.2 & 14.3 |
| 7257 | | Spiral galaxy | Aquarius | 22^{h} 22^{m} 35.4^{s} | −04° 07′ 26″ | 14 |
| 7259 | | Spiral galaxy | Piscis Austrinus | 22^{h} 23^{m} 05.5^{s} | −28° 57′ 17.4″ | 13.1 |
| 7280 | | Lenticular galaxy | Pegasus | 22^{h} 26^{m} 27.5764^{s} | +16° 08′ 53.493″ | 12.1 |
| 7292 | | Irregular galaxy | Pegasus | 22^{h} 28^{m} 26.2896^{s} | +30° 17′ 29.904″ | 13.03 |
| 7293 | Helix Nebula | Planetary nebula | Aquarius | 22^{h} 29^{m} 38.6^{s} | −20° 50′ 14″ | 13.2 |
| 7300 | | Intermediate spiral galaxy | Aquarius | 22^{h} 30^{m} 59.9137^{s} | −14° 00′ 12.631″ | 13.6 |

== 7301–7400 ==
| NGC number | Other names/notes | Object type | Constellation | Right ascension (J2000) | Declination (J2000) | Apparent magnitude |
|---|---|---|---|---|---|---|
| 7301 | discovered by Leavenworth in 1886 | Barred spiral galaxy | Aquarius | 22^{h} 30^{m} 34.8^{s} | −17° 34′ 25″ | 13.3 |
| 7302 | | Elliptical galaxy | Aquarius | 22^{h} 32^{m} 23.9^{s} | −14° 07′ 15″ | 12.3 |
| 7303 | | Spiral galaxy | Pegasus | 22^{h} 31^{m} 33.0^{s} | +30° 57′ 24″ | 12.8 |
| 7305 | | Elliptical galaxy | Pegasus | 22^{h} 32^{m} 13.9^{s} | +11° 42′ 44″ | 14.1 |
| 7312 | | Barred spiral galaxy | Pegasus | 22^{h} 34^{m} 34.79^{s} | +05° 49′ 02.5″ | 13.4 |
| 7314 | | Spiral galaxy | Piscis Austrinus | 22^{h} 35^{m} 46.1^{s} | −26° 03′ 02″ | 11.6 |
| 7315 | | Lenticular galaxy | Pegasus | 22^{h} 35^{m} 31.9^{s} | +34° 48′ 11″ | 13.8 |
| 7316 | | Barred spiral galaxy | Pegasus | 22^{h} 35^{m} 56.3485^{s} | +20° 19′ 19.666″ | 13.62 |
| 7318 | (Part of Stephan's Quintet) | Interacting galaxy | Pegasus | 22^{h} 35^{m} 58.4^{s} | +33° 57′ 57″ | 13.9 |
| 7318a | (Part of Stephan's Quintet) | Interacting galaxy | Pegasus | 22^{h} 35^{m} 56.9^{s} | +33° 57′ 54″ | 14.9 |
| 7318b | (Part of Stephan's Quintet) | Interacting galaxy | Pegasus | 22^{h} 35^{m} 58.5^{s} | +33° 57′ 55″ | 14.1 |
| 7319 | (Part of Stephan's Quintet) | Interacting galaxy | Pegasus | 22^{h} 36^{m} 03.7^{s} | +33° 58′ 31″ | 14.8 |
| 7320 | | Spiral galaxy | Pegasus | 22^{h} 36^{m} 03.6^{s} | +33° 56′ 53″ | 13.8 |
| 7320c | | Spiral galaxy | Pegasus | 22^{h} 36^{m} 20.3^{s} | +33° 59′ 07″ | 17 |
| 7321 | | Barred spiral galaxy | Pegasus | 22^{h} 36^{m} 28.0108^{s} | +21° 37′ 18.648″ | 13.71 |
| 7329 | Four Filter Fusion Galaxy | Barred spiral galaxy | Tucana | 22^{h} 40^{m} 23^{s} | −66° 28′ 44″″ | 11.31 |
| 7331 | Caldwell 30 | Unbarred spiral galaxy | Pegasus | 22^{h} 37^{m} 04.3^{s} | +34° 24′ 59″ | 10.4 |
| 7332 | | Lenticular galaxy | Pegasus | 22^{h} 37^{m} 24.5^{s} | +23° 47′ 54″ | 12.0 |
| 7335 | | Lenticular galaxy | Pegasus | 22^{h} 37^{m} 19.5^{s} | +34° 26′ 50″ | 14.7 |
| 7337 | | Spiral galaxy | Pegasus | 22^{h} 37^{m} 26.8^{s} | +34° 22′ 26″ | 15.7 |
| 7340 | | Elliptical galaxy | Pegasus | 22^{h} 37^{m} 44.2^{s} | +34° 24′ 36″ | 14.9 |
| 7343 | | Spiral galaxy | Pegasus | 22^{h} 38^{m} 38.0^{s} | +34° 04′ 17″ | 14.3 |
| 7354 | | Planetary nebula | Cepheus | 22^{h} 40^{m} 19.9^{s} | +61° 17′ 08″ | |
| 7363 | | Barred spiral galaxy | Pegasus | 22^{h} 43^{m} 19.91^{s} | +34° 00′ 05.4″ | 13.8 |
| 7364 | | Spiral galaxy | Aquarius | 22^{h} 44^{m} 24.3670^{s} | −00° 09′ 43.680″ | 13.4g |
| 7372 | | Spiral galaxy | Pegasus | 22^{h} 45^{m} 45.9840^{s} | +11° 07′ 51.096″ | 14.36 |
| 7380 | | Open cluster | Cepheus | 22^{h} 47^{m} | +58° 07′ | 7.6 |
| 7393 | | Barred spiral galaxy | Aquarius | 22^{h} 51^{m} 38.1^{s} | −05° 33′ 26″ | 13.4 |

== 7401–7500 ==
| NGC number | Other names | Object type | Constellation | Right ascension (J2000) | Declination (J2000) | Apparent magnitude |
|---|---|---|---|---|---|---|
| 7408 | | Barred spiral galaxy | Tucana | 22^{h} 55^{m} 56.8877^{s} | −63° 41′ 40.732″ | 13.33 |
| 7410 | | Barred spiral galaxy | Grus | 22^{h} 55^{m} 00.9^{s} | −39° 39′ 41″ | |
| 7412 | | Spiral galaxy | Grus | 22^{h} 55^{m} 45.8108^{s} | −42° 38′ 30.718″ | 11.1 |
| 7418 | | Spiral galaxy | Grus | 22^{h} 56^{m} 36.2^{s} | −37° 01′ 48.3″ | 11.0 |
| 7419 | | Open cluster | Cepheus | 22^{h} 54^{m} 20^{s} | +60° 48′ 54″ | 13.0 |
| 7421 | | Barred spiral galaxy | Grus | 22^{h} 56^{m} 54.353^{s} | −37° 20′ 50.44″ | 12.0 |
| 7424 | | Spiral galaxy | Grus | 22^{h} 57^{m} 18^{s} | −41° 04′ 14″ | 11.0 |
| 7427 | | Lenticular galaxy | Pegasus | 22^{h} 57^{m} 09.921^{s} | +08° 30′ 20.078″ | 15.1 |
| 7429 | | Open cluster | Cepheus | 22^{h} 55^{m} 53.28^{s} | 59° 57′ 36″ | |
| 7448 | | Interacting galaxy | Pegasus | 23^{h} 00^{m} 03.6^{s} | +15° 58′ 49″ | 11.4 |
| 7454 | | Elliptical galaxy | Pegasus | 23^{h} 01^{m} 06.512^{s} | +16° 23′ 18.48″ | 11.8 |
| 7456 | | Spiral galaxy | Grus | 23^{h} 02^{m} 10.3631^{s} | −39° 34′ 09.804″ | 12.78 |
| 7457 | | Lenticular galaxy | Pegasus | 23^{h} 00^{m} 59.934^{s} | +30° 08′ 41.79″ | 11.87 |
| 7459 | | Spiral galaxy | Pisces | 23^{h} 01^{m} 31^{s} | 06° 48′ 26″ | |
| 7466 | IC 5281 | Spiral galaxy | Pegasus | 23^{h} 02^{m} 03.4251^{s} | +27° 03′ 09.491″ | 13.5 |
| 7469 | | Spiral galaxy | Pegasus | 23^{h} 03^{m} 15.6^{s} | +08° 42′ 26″ | 12.3 |
| 7479 | | Spiral galaxy | Pegasus | 23^{h} 04^{m} 56.7^{s} | +12° 19′ 23″ | 11.7 |
| 7492 | | Globular cluster | Aquarius | 23^{h} 08^{m} 26.7^{s} | −15° 36′ 39″ | 11.2 |
| 7496 | | Barred spiral galaxy | Grus | 23^{h} 09^{m} 47.3^{s} | −43° 25′ 40.6″ | 11.1 |
| 7499 | | Unbarred lenticular galaxy | Pisces | 23^{h} 10^{m} 22.375^{s} | +07° 34′ 50.20″ | 12.98 |

== 7501–7600 ==
| NGC number | Other names | Object type | Constellation | Right ascension (J2000) | Declination (J2000) | Apparent magnitude |
|---|---|---|---|---|---|---|
| 7501 | | Elliptical galaxy | Pisces | 23^{h} 10^{m} 30.424^{s} | +07° 35′ 20.53″ | 13.31 |
| 7503 | | Elliptical galaxy | Pisces | 23^{h} 10^{m} 42.279^{s} | +07° 34′ 03.66″ | 13.06 |
| 7510 | | Open cluster | Cepheus | 23^{h} 11^{m} | +60° 34′ | 8.8 |
| 7513 | | Barred spiral galaxy | Sculptor | 23^{h} 13^{m} 14.0^{s} | −28° 21′ 27″ | 11.3 |
| 7522 | | Unknown | Aquarius | 23^{h} 15^{m} 36.4^{s} | −22° 53′ 42″ | |
| 7531 | | Spiral galaxy | Grus | 23^{h} 14^{m} 48.5^{s} | −43° 35′ 59.8″ | 11.3 |
| 7537 | | Spiral galaxy | Pisces | 23^{h} 14^{m} 34.5^{s} | +04° 29′ 54″ | 13.9 |
| 7538 | | Diffuse nebula | Cepheus | 23^{h} 13^{m} 45.7^{s} | +61° 28′ 21″ | |
| 7541 | | Barred spiral galaxy | Pisces | 23^{h} 14^{m} 43.90^{s} | +04° 32′ 03.0″ | |
| 7544 | | Lenticular galaxy | Pisces | 23^{h} 14^{m} 56.984^{s} | −02° 11′ 57.56″ | 15.93 |
| 7549 | | Barred spiral galaxy | Pegasus | 23^{h} 15^{m} 17.2735^{s} | +19° 02′ 30.087″ | 13.74 |
| 7552 | | Barred spiral galaxy | Grus | 23^{h} 16^{m} 10.7^{s} | −42° 35′ 05″ | 11.2 |
| 7582 | | Seyfert galaxy | Grus | 23^{h} 18^{m} 23.5^{s} | −42° 22′ 14″ | 11.37 |
| 7583 | | Lenticular galaxy | Pisces | 23^{h} 17^{m} 52.778^{s} | +07° 22′ 45.84″ | 14.45 |
| 7585 | | Lenticular galaxy | Aquarius | 23^{h} 18^{m} 01.3^{s} | −04° 39′ 01″ | 11.4 |
| 7590 | | Spiral galaxy | Grus | 23^{h} 18^{m} 54.827^{s} | −42° 14′ 20.574″ | 11.37 |
| 7592 | | Interacting galaxies | Aquarius | 23^{h} 18^{m} 22.2^{s} | −04° 25′ 01″ | 13.5 |
| 7599 | | Barred spiral galaxy | Grus | 23^{h} 19^{m} 31.055^{s} | −42° 15′ 25.24″ | 11.5 |
| 7600 | | Elliptical galaxy | Aquarius | 23^{h} 18^{m} 53.8^{s} | −07° 34′ 50″ | 12.95 |

== 7601–7700 ==
| NGC number | Other names | Object type | Constellation | Right ascension (J2000) | Declination (J2000) | Apparent magnitude |
|---|---|---|---|---|---|---|
| 7603 | | Seyfert galaxy | Pisces | 23^{h} 18^{m} 56.4^{s} | +00° 14′ 38.2″ | 14.04 |
| 7606 | | Spiral galaxy | Aquarius | 23^{h} 19^{m} 04.8^{s} | −08° 29′ 06″ | 10.8 |
| 7610 | | Spiral galaxy | Pegasus | 23^{h} 19^{m} 41.4^{s} | +10° 11′ 06″ | 13.44 |
| 7619 | | Elliptical galaxy | Pegasus | 23^{h} 27^{m} 14.524^{s} | +08° 12′ 22.63″ | |
| 7623 | | Lenticular galaxy | Pegasus | 23^{h} 20^{m} 38.7^{s} | +08° 13′ 54″ | |
| 7625 | | Peculiar galaxy | Pegasus | 23^{h} 20^{m} 30.132^{s} | +17° 13′ 32.16″ | 12.9 |
| 7626 | | Elliptical galaxy | Pegasus | 23^{h} 21^{m} 41.7500^{s} | +08° 53′ 12.704″ | |
| 7634 | | Lenticular galaxy | Pegasus | 23^{h} 20^{m} 42.5^{s} | +08° 13′ 01″ | 13.57 |
| 7635 | Bubble Nebula | Diffuse nebula | Cassiopeia | 23^{h} 20^{m} 48.3^{s} | +61° 12′ 06″ | ~10 |
| 7637 | | Spiral galaxy | Octans | 23^{h} 26^{m} 27.6374^{s} | −81° 54′ 41.516″ | 13 |
| 7640 | | Barred spiral galaxy | Andromeda | 23^{h} 22^{m} 06.58^{s} | 40° 50′ 43.5″ | 11.1 |
| 7645 | | Barred spiral galaxy | Sculptor | 23^{h} 23^{m} 47.3070^{s} | −29° 23′ 17.083″ | 13.77 |
| 7647 | | Elliptical galaxy | Pegasus | 23^{h} 23^{m} 57.4331^{s} | +16° 46′ 38.122″ | 13.6 |
| 7654 | Messier 52 | Open cluster | Cassiopeia | 23^{h} 24^{m} 48.0^{s} | +61° 35′ 36″ | 7.3 |
| 7660 | | Elliptical galaxy | Pegasus | 23^{h} 25^{m} 48.6643^{s} | +27° 01′ 47.440″ | 12.66 |
| 7662 | Copeland's Blue Snowball | Planetary nebula | Andromeda | 23^{h} 25^{m} 54.0^{s} | +42° 32′ 06″ | 8.6 |
| 7673 | | Spiral galaxy | Pegasus | 23^{h} 27^{m} 41.4^{s} | +23° 35′ 21″ | 13.2 |
| 7674 | | Spiral galaxy | Pegasus | 23^{h} 27^{m} 56.7^{s} | +08° 46′ 45″ | 13.1 |
| 7678 | | Intermediate spiral galaxy | Pegasus | 23^{h} 28^{m} 27.8834^{s} | +22° 25′ 16.336″ | 11.8 |
| 7679 | | Lenticular galaxy | Pisces | 23^{h} 28^{m} 46.7^{s} | +03° 30′ 41″ | 12.5 |
| 7682 | | Barred spiral galaxy | Pisces | 23^{h} 29^{m} 03.9^{s} | +03° 32′ 00″ | 13.3 |
| 7686 | | Open cluster | Andromeda | 23^{h} 29^{m} 41.3^{s} | +49° 10′ 12″ | 5.6 |
| 7689 | | Intermediate spiral galaxy | Phoenix | 23^{h} 33^{m} 16.7309^{s} | −54° 05′ 39.692″ | 12.2 |
| 7691 | | Intermediate spiral galaxy | Pegasus | 23^{h} 32^{m} 24.4185^{s} | +15° 50′ 52.392″ | 13.9g |

== 7701–7800 ==
| NGC number | Other names | Object type | Constellation | Right ascension (J2000) | Declination (J2000) | Apparent magnitude |
|---|---|---|---|---|---|---|
| 7701 | | Lenticular galaxy | Pisces | 23^{h} 34^{m} 31.5^{s} | −02° 51′ 15″ | 14.36 |
| 7702 | | Lenticular galaxy | Phoenix | 23^{h} 35^{m} 28.9^{s} | −56° 00′ 44″ | 13.08 |
| 7703 | | Lenticular galaxy | Pegasus | 23^{h} 34^{m} 46.9^{s} | +16° 04′ 33″ | 14.41 |
| 7704 | | Lenticular galaxy | Pisces | 23^{h} 35^{m} 01.0^{s} | +04° 53′ 51″ | 14.4 |
| 7705 | | Lenticular galaxy | Pisces | 23^{h} 35^{m} 02.5^{s} | +04° 48′ 14″ | 15.4 |
| 7706 | | Lenticular galaxy | Pisces | 23^{h} 35^{m} 10.4^{s} | +04° 57′ 51″ | 14.24 |
| 7707 | | Lenticular galaxy | Andromeda | 23^{h} 34^{m} 51.4^{s} | +44° 18′ 15″ | 14.4 |
| 7708 | | Open cluster | Cepheus | 23^{h} 35^{m} 01.4^{s} | +72° 49′ 59″ | |
| 7709 | | Lenticular galaxy | Aquarius | 23^{h} 35^{m} 27.5^{s} | −16° 42′ 18″ | 13.6 |
| 7710 | | Lenticular galaxy | Pisces | 23^{h} 35^{m} 46.1^{s} | −02° 52′ 51″ | 14.95 |
| 7711 | | Lenticular galaxy | Pegasus | 23^{h} 35^{m} 39.4^{s} | +15° 18′ 07″ | 13.1 |
| 7712 | | Spiral galaxy | Pegasus | 23^{h} 35^{m} 51.6^{s} | +23° 37′ 07″ | 13.74 |
| 7713 | | Barred spiral galaxy | Sculptor | 23^{h} 36^{m} 15.0^{s} | −37° 56′ 17″ | 11.6 |
| 7713A | | Barred spiral galaxy | Sculptor | 23^{h} 37^{m} 08.3^{s} | −37° 42′ 51″ | 12.98 |
| 7714 | | Spiral galaxy | Pisces | 23^{h} 36^{m} 14.1^{s} | +02° 09′ 19″ | 12.5 |
| 7715 | | Irregular galaxy | Pisces | 23^{h} 36^{m} 22.1^{s} | +02° 09′ 23″ | 14.68 |
| 7716 | | Spiral galaxy | Pisces | 23^{h} 36^{m} 31.4^{s} | +00° 17′ 50″ | 12.82 |
| 7717 | | Lenticular galaxy | Aquarius | 23^{h} 37^{m} 43.7^{s} | −15° 07′ 07″ | 13.83 |
| 7718 | | Spiral galaxy | Pegasus | 23^{h} 38^{m} 05.0^{s} | +25° 43′ 11″ | 15.01 |
| 7719 | | Spiral galaxy | Aquarius | 23^{h} 38^{m} 02.6^{s} | −22° 58′ 28″ | 15.12 |
| 7720 | | Elliptical galaxy | Pegasus | 23^{h} 38^{m} 29.4^{s} | +27° 01′ 53″ | 13.9 |
| 7721 | | Spiral galaxy | Aquarius | 23^{h} 38^{m} 48.6^{s} | −06° 31′ 04″ | 12.22 |
| 7722 | | Lenticular galaxy | Pegasus | 23^{h} 38^{m} 41.2^{s} | +15° 57′ 17″ | 13.3 |
| 7723 | | Barred spiral galaxy | Aquarius | 23^{h} 38^{m} 57.1^{s} | −12° 57′ 40″ | 11.94 |
| 7724 | | Barred spiral galaxy | Aquarius | 23^{h} 39^{m} 07.1^{s} | −12° 13′ 27″ | 13.9 |
| 7725 | | Lenticular galaxy | Aquarius | 23^{h} 39^{m} 14.8^{s} | −04° 32′ 22″ | 15 |
| 7726 | | Barred spiral galaxy | Pegasus | 23^{h} 39^{m} 11.9^{s} | +27° 06′ 55″ | 15.04 |
| 7727 | | Spiral galaxy | Aquarius | 23^{h} 39^{m} 53.7^{s} | −12° 17′ 34″ | 11.5 |
| 7728 | | Elliptical galaxy | Pegasus | 23^{h} 40^{m} 00.8^{s} | +27° 08′ 01″ | 14.13 |
| 7729 | | Spiral galaxy | Pegasus | 23^{h} 40^{m} 33.6^{s} | +29° 11′ 17″ | 14.37 |
| 7730 | | Barred spiral galaxy | Pegasus | 23^{h} 40^{m} 45.9^{s} | −20° 30′ 32″ | 15.14 |
| 7731 | | Barred spiral galaxy | Pisces | 23^{h} 41^{m} 29.1^{s} | +03° 44′ 24″ | 13.51 |
| 7732 | | Spiral galaxy | Pisces | 23^{h} 41^{m} 33.9^{s} | +03° 43′ 30″ | 14.27 |
| 7733 | | Barred spiral galaxy | Tucana | 23^{h} 42^{m} 32.9^{s} | −65° 57′ 23″ | 14.29 |
| 7734 | | Barred spiral galaxy | Tucana | 23^{h} 42^{m} 42.9^{s} | −65° 56′ 41″ | 13.89 |
| 7735 | | Elliptical galaxy | Pegasus | 23^{h} 42^{m} 17.3^{s} | +26° 13′ 54″ | 14.56 |
| 7736 | | Lenticular galaxy | Aquarius | 23^{h} 42^{m} 25.8^{s} | −19° 27′ 08″ | 13.87 |
| 7737 | | Lenticular galaxy | Pegasus | 23^{h} 42^{m} 46.4^{s} | +27° 03′ 11″ | 14.81 |
| 7738 | | Barred spiral galaxy | Pisces | 23^{h} 44^{m} 02.0^{s} | +00° 31′ 00″ | 13.9 |
| 7739 | | Elliptical galaxy | Pisces | 23^{h} 44^{m} 30.1^{s} | +00° 19′ 14″ | 14.7 |
| 7740 | | Lenticular galaxy | Pegasus | 23^{h} 43^{m} 32.3^{s} | +27° 18′ 43″ | 14.9 |
| 7741 | | Barred spiral galaxy | Pegasus | 23^{h} 43^{m} 54.4^{s} | +26° 04′ 32″ | 11.84 |
| 7742 | Fried Egg Galaxy | Spiral galaxy | Pegasus | 23^{h} 44^{m} 22.1^{s} | +10° 46′ 01″ | 12.35 |
| 7743 | | Lenticular galaxy | Pegasus | 23^{h} 44^{m} 21.1^{s} | +09° 56′ 03″ | 12.38 |
| 7744 | | Lenticular galaxy | Phoenix | 23^{h} 44^{m} 59.2^{s} | −42° 54′ 39″ | 12.87 |
| 7745 | | Elliptical galaxy | Pegasus | 23^{h} 44^{m} 45.8^{s} | +25° 54′ 32″ | 15.5 |
| 7746 | | Lenticular galaxy | Pisces | 23^{h} 45^{m} 20.0^{s} | −01° 41′ 06″ | 14.07 |
| 7747 | | Barred spiral galaxy | Pegasus | 23^{h} 45^{m} 32.2^{s} | +27° 21′ 39″ | 14.38 |
| 7748 | | Star | Cepheus | 23^{h} 44^{m} 56.7^{s} | +69° 45′ 17″ | 7.17 |
| 7749 | | Lenticular galaxy | Sculptor | 23^{h} 45^{m} 47.5^{s} | −29° 31′ 04″ | 14.34 |
| 7750 | | Spiral galaxy | Pisces | 23^{h} 46^{m} 37.8^{s} | +03° 47′ 59″ | 13.49 |
| 7751 | | Spiral galaxy | Pisces | 23^{h} 46^{m} 58.3^{s} | +06° 51′ 43″ | 13.81 |
| 7752 | | Lenticular galaxy | Pegasus | 23^{h} 46^{m} 58.5^{s} | +29° 27′ 32″ | 15 |
| 7753 | | Barred spiral galaxy | Pegasus | 23^{h} 47^{m} 04.8^{s} | +29° 29′ 00″ | 12.83 |
| 7754 | | Spiral galaxy | Aquarius | 23^{h} 49^{m} 11.2^{s} | −16° 36′ 02″ | 15.5 |
| 7755 | | Barred spiral galaxy | Sculptor | 23^{h} 47^{m} 51.7^{s} | −30° 31′ 19″ | 12.56 |
| 7756 | | Star | Pisces | 23^{h} 48^{m} 28.6^{s} | +04° 07′ 31″ | |
| 7757 | | Spiral galaxy | Pisces | 23^{h} 48^{m} 45.5^{s} | +04° 10′ 16″ | 13.14 |
| 7758 | | Lenticular galaxy | Aquarius | 23^{h} 48^{m} 55.2^{s} | −22° 01′ 27″ | 15.36 |
| 7759 | | Lenticular galaxy | Aquarius | 23^{h} 48^{m} 54.7^{s} | −16° 32′ 28″ | 14.5 |
| 7759A | | Spiral galaxy | Aquarius | 23^{h} 48^{m} 56.9^{s} | −16° 32′ 26″ | 15.5 |
| 7760 | | Elliptical galaxy | Pegasus | 23^{h} 49^{m} 11.9^{s} | +30° 58′ 59″ | 14.45 |
| 7761 | | Lenticular galaxy | Aquarius | 23^{h} 51^{m} 28.9^{s} | −13° 22′ 54″ | 13.95 |
| 7762 | | Open cluster | Cepheus | 23^{h} 50^{m} 01.7^{s} | +68° 02′ 17″ | |
| 7763 | | Lenticular galaxy | Aquarius | 23^{h} 50^{m} 15.7^{s} | −16° 35′ 24″ | 15.25 |
| 7764 | | Irregular galaxy | Phoenix | 23^{h} 50^{m} 54.0^{s} | −40° 43′ 42″ | 12.6 |
| 7764A1 | | Lenticular galaxy | Phoenix | 23^{h} 53^{m} 20.1^{s} | −40° 48′ 15″ | 15.35 |
| 7764A2 | | Spiral galaxy | Phoenix | 23^{h} 53^{m} 22.5^{s} | −40° 48′ 37″ | 15.35 |
| 7764A3 | | Spiral galaxy | Phoenix | 23^{h} 53^{m} 26.2^{s} | −40° 48′ 57″ | 16.61 |
| 7765 | | Barred spiral galaxy | Pegasus | 23^{h} 50^{m} 52.1^{s} | +27° 09′ 59″ | 15.46 |
| 7766 | | Lenticular galaxy | Pegasus | 23^{h} 50^{m} 55.9^{s} | +27° 07′ 35″ | 15 |
| 7767 | | Lenticular galaxy | Pegasus | 23^{h} 50^{m} 56.3^{s} | +27° 05′ 14″ | 14.5 |
| 7768 | | Elliptical galaxy | Pegasus | 23^{h} 50^{m} 58.6^{s} | +27° 08′ 51″ | 13.24 |
| 7769 | | Spiral galaxy | Pegasus | 23^{h} 51^{m} 04.0^{s} | +20° 09′ 02″ | 12.77 |
| 7770 | | Lenticular galaxy | Pegasus | 23^{h} 51^{m} 22.5^{s} | +20° 05′ 47″ | 14.4 |
| 7771 | | Barred spiral galaxy | Pegasus | 23^{h} 51^{m} 24.8^{s} | +20° 06′ 42″ | 12.2 |
| 7772 | | Non-existent (Note: Thought to be an open cluster Gaia data shows stars in the area are unrelated) | Pegasus | 23^{h} 51^{m} 45.9^{s} | +16° 14′ 53″ | |
| 7773 | | Barred spiral galaxy | Pegasus | 23^{h} 52^{m} 09.9^{s} | +31° 16′ 36″ | 14.24 |
| 7774 | | Elliptical galaxy | Pegasus | 23^{h} 52^{m} 11.2^{s} | +11° 28′ 12″ | 14.6 |
| 7775 | | Spiral galaxy | Pegasus | 23^{h} 52^{m} 24.4^{s} | +28° 46′ 22″ | 13.96 |
| 7776 | | Spiral galaxy | Aquarius | 23^{h} 54^{m} 16.5^{s} | −13° 35′ 11″ | 14.65 |
| 7777 | | Lenticular galaxy | Pegasus | 23^{h} 53^{m} 12.5^{s} | +28° 17′ 00″ | 14.3 |
| 7778 | | Elliptical galaxy | Pisces | 23^{h} 53^{m} 19.7^{s} | +07° 52′ 15″ | 13.68 |
| 7779 | | Lenticular galaxy | Pisces | 23^{h} 53^{m} 26.8^{s} | +07° 52′ 32″ | 13.66 |
| 7780 | | Barred spiral galaxy | Pisces | 23^{h} 53^{m} 32.2^{s} | +08° 07′ 05″ | 14.8 |
| 7781 | | Spiral galaxy | Pisces | 23^{h} 53^{m} 46.0^{s} | +07° 51′ 38″ | 15 |
| 7782 | | Spiral galaxy | Pisces | 23^{h} 53^{m} 53.9^{s} | +07° 58′ 14″ | 13.08 |
| 7783 | | Lenticular galaxy | Pisces | 23^{h} 54^{m} 10.1^{s} | +00° 22′ 58″ | 13.9 |
| 7783B | | Lenticular galaxy | Pisces | 23^{h} 54^{m} 12.1^{s} | +00° 22′ 37″ | 14.99 |
| 7783C | | Elliptical galaxy | Pisces | 23^{h} 54^{m} 13.8^{s} | +00° 21′ 25″ | 16.27 |
| 7783D | | Spiral galaxy | Pisces | 23^{h} 54^{m} 10.6^{s} | +00° 23′ 39″ | 16.94 |
| 7784 | | Elliptical galaxy | Pegasus | 23^{h} 55^{m} 13.7^{s} | +21° 45′ 44″ | 15.5 |
| 7785 | | Elliptical galaxy | Pisces | 23^{h} 55^{m} 19.0^{s} | +05° 54′ 57″ | 12.63 |
| 7786 | | Spiral galaxy | Pegasus | 23^{h} 55^{m} 21.5^{s} | +21° 35′ 17″ | 14.1 |
| 7787 | | Lenticular galaxy | Pisces | 23^{h} 56^{m} 07.8^{s} | +00° 32′ 58″ | 15 |
| 7788 | | Open cluster | Cassiopeia | 23^{h} 56^{m} 45.6^{s} | +61° 24′ 00″ | |
| 7789 | | Open cluster | Cassiopeia | 23^{h} 57^{m} 24.0^{s} | +56° 42′ 30″ | 6.7 |
| 7790 | | Open cluster | Cassiopeia | 23^{h} 58^{m} 24.2^{s} | +61° 12′ 30″ | 8.5 |
| 7791 | | Double star | Pegasus | 23^{h} 57^{m} 57.3^{s} | +10° 45′ 57″ | 12.9 |
| 7792 | | Spiral galaxy | Pegasus | 23^{h} 58^{m} 03.6^{s} | +16° 30′ 05″ | 15 |
| 7793 | | Flocculent spiral galaxy | Sculptor | 23^{h} 57^{m} 49.8^{s} | −32° 35′ 28″ | 9.98 |
| 7794 | | Spiral galaxy | Pegasus | 23^{h} 58^{m} 34.1^{s} | +10° 43′ 41″ | 13.53 |
| 7795 | | Open cluster | Cassiopeia | 23^{h} 58^{m} 37.4^{s} | +60° 02′ 06″ | |
| 7796 | | Elliptical galaxy | Phoenix | 23^{h} 58^{m} 59.8^{s} | −55° 27′ 30″ | 12.46 |
| 7797 | | Spiral galaxy | Pisces | 23^{h} 58^{m} 58.9^{s} | +03° 38′ 05″ | 14.5 |
| 7798 | | Barred spiral galaxy | Pegasus | 23^{h} 59^{m} 25.5^{s} | +20° 44′ 59″ | 12.97 |
| 7799 | | Star | Pegasus | 23^{h} 59^{m} 31.5^{s} | +31° 17′ 44″ | 15.2 |
| 7800 | | Irregular galaxy | Pegasus | 23^{h} 59^{m} 36.3^{s} | +14° 48′ 20″ | 13.06 |

== 7801–7840 ==
| NGC number | Other names | Object type | Constellation | Right ascension (J2000) | Declination (J2000) | Apparent magnitude |
|---|---|---|---|---|---|---|
| 7802 | | Lenticular galaxy | Pisces | 00^{h} 01^{m} 00^{s} | +06° 14′ 31″ | |
| 7803 | | Spiral galaxy | Pegasus | 00^{h} 01^{m} 20.0^{s} | +13° 06′ 40″ | 13.1 |
| 7804 | | Double star | Cetus | 00^{h} 01^{m} 18.8^{s} | +07° 44′ 59″ | |
| 7808 | | Lenticular galaxy | Cetus | 00^{h} 03^{m} 32.1^{s} | −10° 44′ 41″ | 14.22 |
| 7810 | | Spiral galaxy | Pegasus | 00^{h} 02^{m} 19.1^{s} | −12° 58′ 18″ | 13.0 |
| 7812 | | Spiral galaxy | Sculptor | 00^{h} 02^{m} 54.5^{s} | −34° 14′ 08″ | 13.86 |
| 7813 | (Assumed to be duplicate of IC 5384) | Spiral galaxy | Cetus | 00^{h} 04^{m} 09.1^{s} | −11° 59′ 02″ | 14.96 |
| 7814 | | Spiral galaxy | Pegasus | 00^{h} 03^{m} 14.9^{s} | +16° 08′ 44″ | 11.56 |
| 7815 | | Star | Pegasus | 00^{h} 03^{m} 24.8^{s} | +20° 42′ 15″ | |
| 7816 | | Spiral galaxy | Pisces | 00^{h} 03^{m} 48.8^{s} | +07° 28′ 43″ | 13.61 |
| 7820 | | Lenticular galaxy | Pisces | 00^{h} 04^{m} 30.8^{s} | +05° 12′ 01″ | 12.9 |
| 7822 | | Nebula | Cepheus | 00^{h} 03^{m} 35.3^{s} | +67° 09′ 42″ | |
| 7826 | | Non-existent (Note: Thought to be an open cluster Gaia data shows stars in the area are unrelated) | Cetus | 00^{h} 05^{m} 19.3^{s} | −20° 41′ 18″ | |
| 7828 | | Irregular galaxy | Cetus | 00^{h} 06^{m} 27.1^{s} | −13° 24′ 58″ | 14.4 |
| 7829 | | Lenticular galaxy | Cetus | 00^{h} 06^{m} 29.0^{s} | −13° 25′ 14″ | 15.4 |
| 7830 | | Star | Pisces | 00^{h} 06^{m} 01.8^{s} | +08° 20′ 34″ | |
| 7833 | | Open cluster | Pegasus | 00^{h} 06^{m} 31.4^{s} | +27° 38′ 23″ | |
| 7835 | | Spiral galaxy | Pisces | 00^{h} 06^{m} 46.8^{s} | +08° 25′ 33″ | 15.43 |
| 7836 | | Lenticular galaxy | Andromeda | 00^{h} 08^{m} 01.6^{s} | +33° 04′ 15″ | 14.4 |
| 7837 | | Spiral galaxy | Pisces | 00^{h} 06^{m} 51.4^{s} | +08° 21′ 05″ | 16 |
| 7838 | | Lenticular galaxy | Pisces | 00^{h} 06^{m} 53.9^{s} | +08° 21′ 03″ | 16 |
| 7839 | | Double star | Pegasus | 00^{h} 07^{m} 00.6^{s} | +27° 38′ 07″ | |
| 7840 | | Spiral galaxy | Pisces | 00^{h} 07^{m} 08.8^{s} | +08° 23′ 01″ | 15.8 |

== See also ==
- Lists of astronomical objects
