= NGC 7081 =

Spiral galaxy in the constellation Aquarius

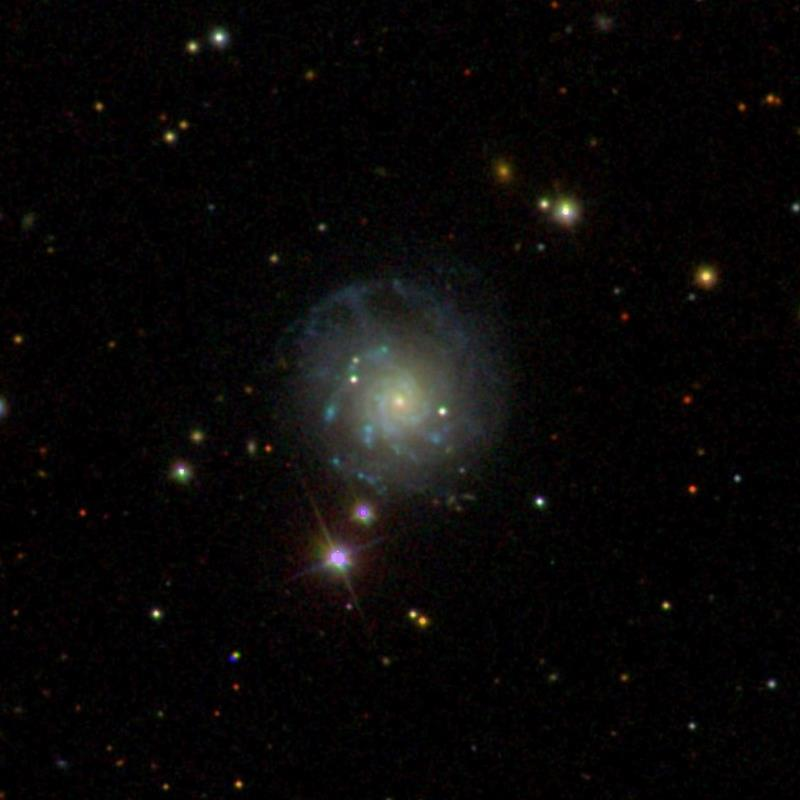
- Spiral galaxy NGC 7081 (SDSS DR14)

Observation data (J2000 epoch)
- Constellation: Aquarius
- Right ascension: 21^{h} 31^{m} 24.1^{s}
- Declination: 02° 29′ 29″
- Redshift: 0.010918
- Heliocentric radial velocity: 3,273 km/s
- Distance: 130 Mly
- Apparent magnitude (V): 13.49

Characteristics
- Type: Sb pec
- Size: ~ 63,576.38 ly (estimated)
- Apparent size (V): 1.3' x 1.3'

Other designations
- CGCG 375-49, IRAS 21288+0216, KAZ 526, MCG 0-54-30, PGC 66891, UGC 11759

NGC 7081 is a spiral galaxy located about 130 million light-years away in the constellation of Aquarius. NGC 7081 was discovered by astronomer William Herschel on October 10, 1790.

One supernova has been observed in NGC 7081: SN 2019sox (Type II, mag. 18.7) was discovered by ATLAS on 16 October 2019.

== See also ==
- List of NGC objects (7001–7840)
