= NGC 7074 =

Galaxy in the constellation Pegasus

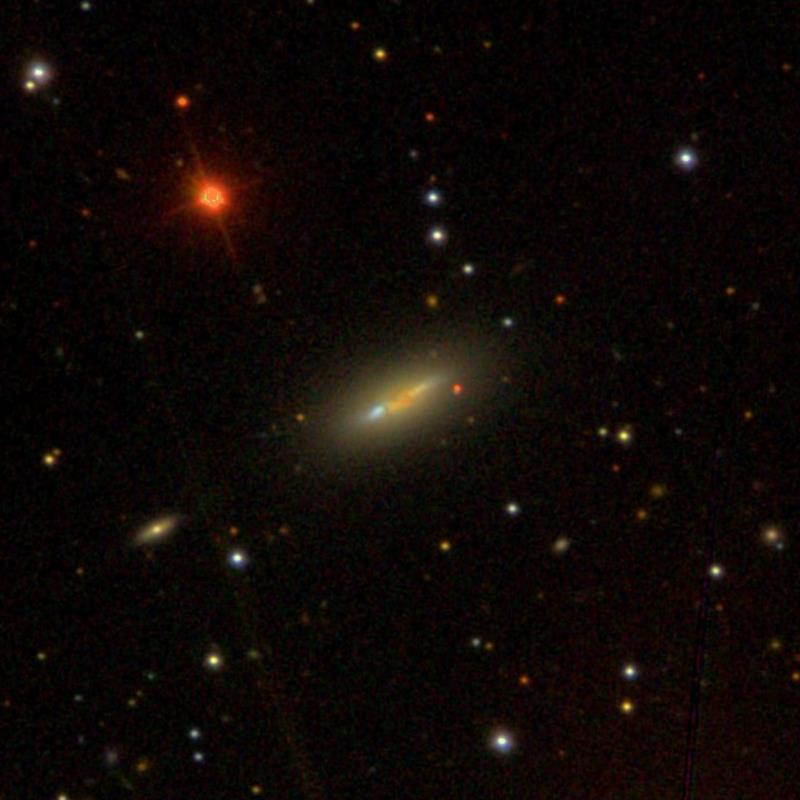
- The galaxy NGC 7074 (SDSS DR14)

Observation data (J2000 epoch)
- Constellation: Pegasus
- Right ascension: 21^{h} 29^{m} 38.8^{s}
- Declination: 06° 40′ 57″
- Redshift: 0.011595
- Heliocentric radial velocity: 3,476 km/s
- Distance: 140 Mly (42.9 Mpc)
- Apparent magnitude (V): 15.0

Characteristics
- Type: S?
- Size: ~54,300 ly (16.64 kpc) (estimated)
- Apparent size (V): 0.9 x 0.4

Other designations
- 2ZW 133, CGCG 401-27, IRAS 21271+0627, PGC 66850

NGC 7074 is an edge-on lenticular galaxy located about 140 million light-years away in the constellation of Pegasus. NGC 7074 was discovered by astronomer Albert Marth on October 16, 1863.

== See also ==
- List of NGC objects (7001–7840)
