= NGC 7085 =

Spiral galaxy in the constellation Pegasus

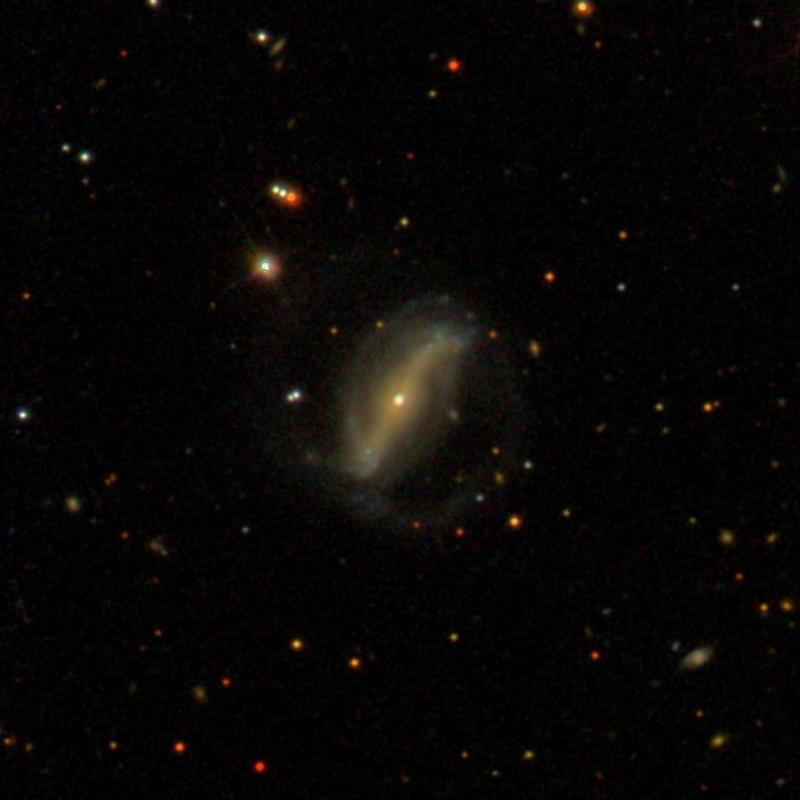
- SDSS image of NGC 7085

Observation data (J2000 epoch)
- Constellation: Pegasus
- Right ascension: 21^{h} 32^{m} 25.2^{s}
- Declination: 06° 34′ 53″
- Redshift: 0.028506
- Heliocentric radial velocity: 8,546 km/s
- Distance: 365.3 Mly
- Apparent magnitude (V): 15.2

Characteristics
- Type: Sc
- Apparent size (V): 0.9' x 0.4'

Other designations
- CGCG 402-2, KARA 919, MCG 1-55-1, NPM1G +06.0539, PGC 66926

NGC 7085 is a spiral galaxy located about 365 million light-years away in the constellation of Pegasus. NGC 7085 was discovered by astronomer Albert Marth on August 3, 1864.

== See also ==
- List of NGC objects (7001–7840)
