= NGC 7171 =

Galaxy in the constellation Aquarius

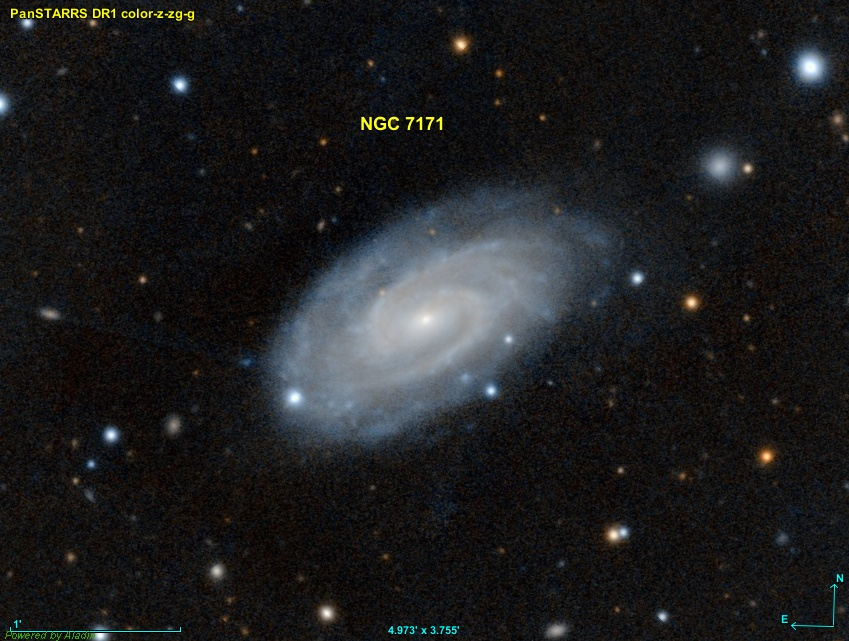
- NGC 7171 imaged by Pan-STARRS

Observation data (J2000 epoch)
- Constellation: Aquarius
- Right ascension: 22^{h} 01^{m} 02.012^{s}
- Declination: −13° 16′ 10.901″
- Redshift: 0.009069
- Heliocentric radial velocity: 2719 ± 6 km/s
- Distance: 114.9 ± 8.1 Mly (35.22 ± 2.49 Mpc)
- Apparent magnitude (V): 12.2

Characteristics
- Type: SB(rs)b
- Size: ~97,600 ly (29.93 kpc) (estimated)
- Apparent size (V): 2.6′ × 1.5′

Other designations
- IRAS 21583-1330, 2MASX J22010200-1316108, MCG -02-56-005, PGC 67839

NGC 7171 is a barred spiral galaxy in the constellation of Aquarius. Its velocity with respect to the cosmic microwave background is 2388 ± 24 km/s, which corresponds to a Hubble distance of 35.22 ± 2.49 Mpc (~115 million light-years). It was discovered by German–British astronomer William Herschel on 12 August 1787.

According to the SIMBAD database, NGC 7171 is an active Seyfert II galaxy.

One supernova has been observed in NGC 7171: SN 2023yoo (Type Ia, mag. 17.339) was discovered by ATLAS on 28 November 2023.

== See also ==
- List of NGC objects (7001–7840)
