= NGC 7066 =

Spiral galaxy in the constellation Pegasus

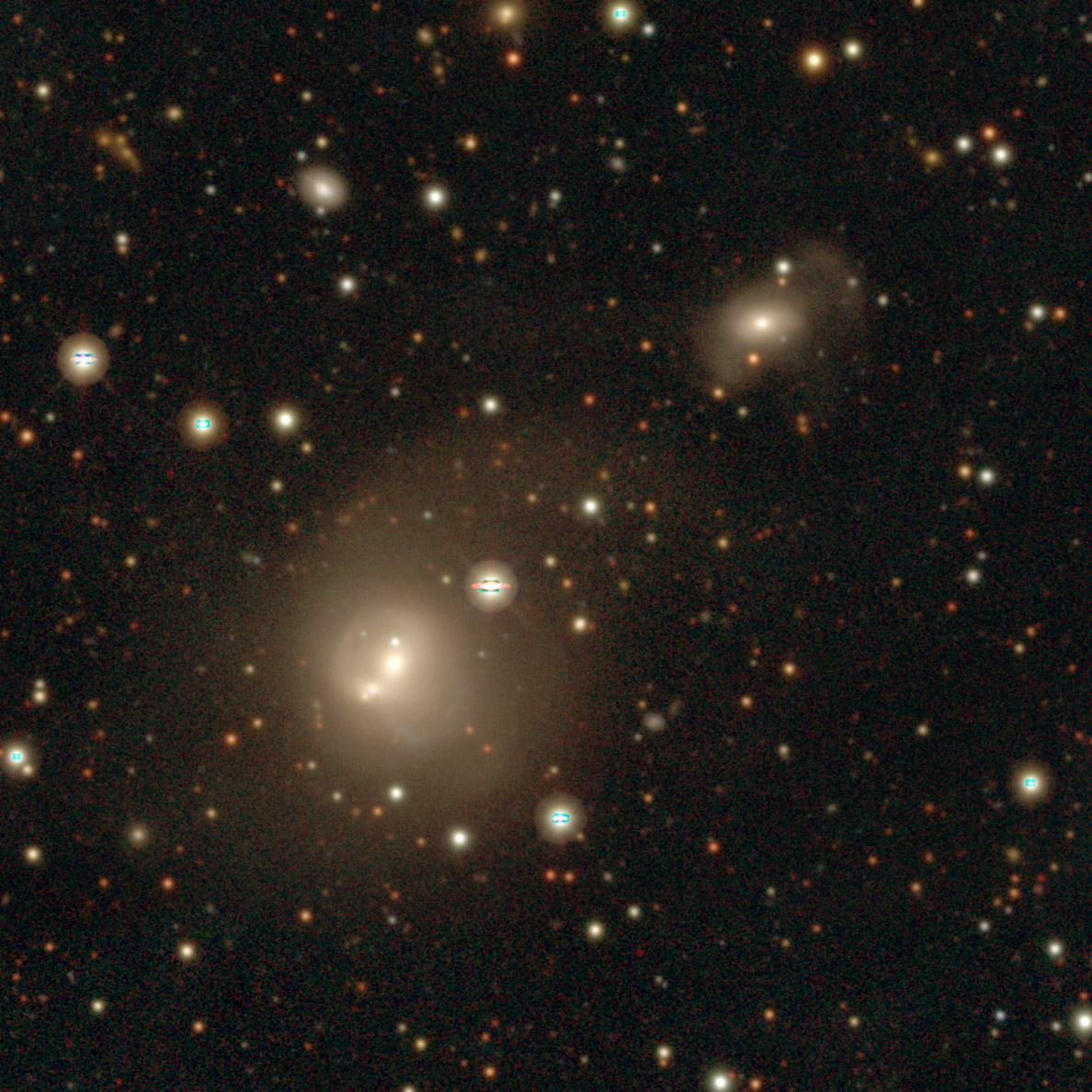
- Image of NGC 7066 by legacy surveys

Observation data (J2000 epoch)
- Constellation: Pegasus
- Right ascension: 21^{h} 26^{m} 14.0^{s}
- Declination: 14° 10′ 55″
- Redshift: 0.017045
- Heliocentric radial velocity: 5,110 km/s
- Distance: 213 Mly
- Apparent magnitude (V): 14.80

Characteristics
- Type: S?
- Apparent size (V): 1.0 x 1.0

Other designations
- 2ZW 130, CGCG 426-54, MCG 2-54-25, PGC 66747, UGC 11741

NGC 7066 is a spiral galaxy located about 210 million light-years away in the constellation of Pegasus. NGC 7066 was discovered by astronomer Lewis Swift on August 31, 1886.

== See also ==
- List of NGC objects (7001–7840)
