= NGC 7797 =

Spiral galaxy in the constellation Pisces

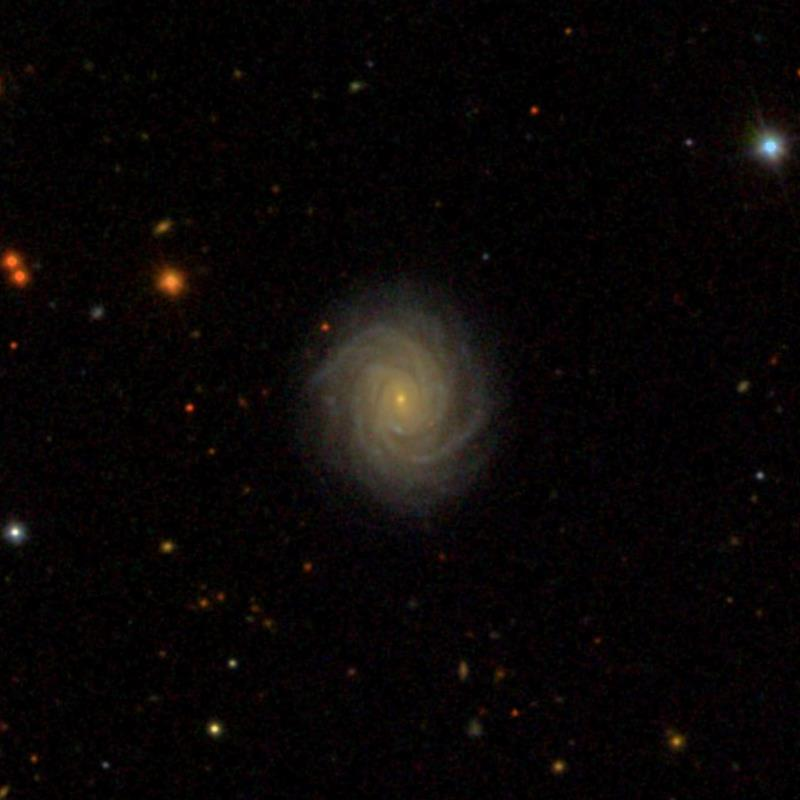
- The galaxy, as seen during the Sloan Digital Sky Survey

Observation data (J2000 epoch)
- Constellation: Pisces
- Right ascension: 23h 58m 59s
- Declination: +03° 38’ 04”
- Redshift: 0.029534
- Heliocentric radial velocity: 8,854 km/s
- Distance: 401 Mly (122.9 Mpc)
- Apparent magnitude (V): 13.8
- Apparent magnitude (B): 14.6
- Surface brightness: 23.29 mag/arcsec^2

Characteristics
- Type: SAb-SAc
- Apparent size (V): 1.0' x 0.9'

Other designations
- PGC 73125, UGC 12877, CGCG 382-010, MCG +00-01-011

NGC 7797 is a Hubble-type SAb-SAc spiral galaxy that is located in the constellation Pisces. It is estimated to be 400 million light-years from the Milky Way and has a diameter of about 115,000 light-years. It was discovered by astronomer William Herschel on December 6, 1790.

== See also ==
- List of NGC objects (7001–7840)
