= NGC 7190 =

Galaxy in the constellation Pegasus

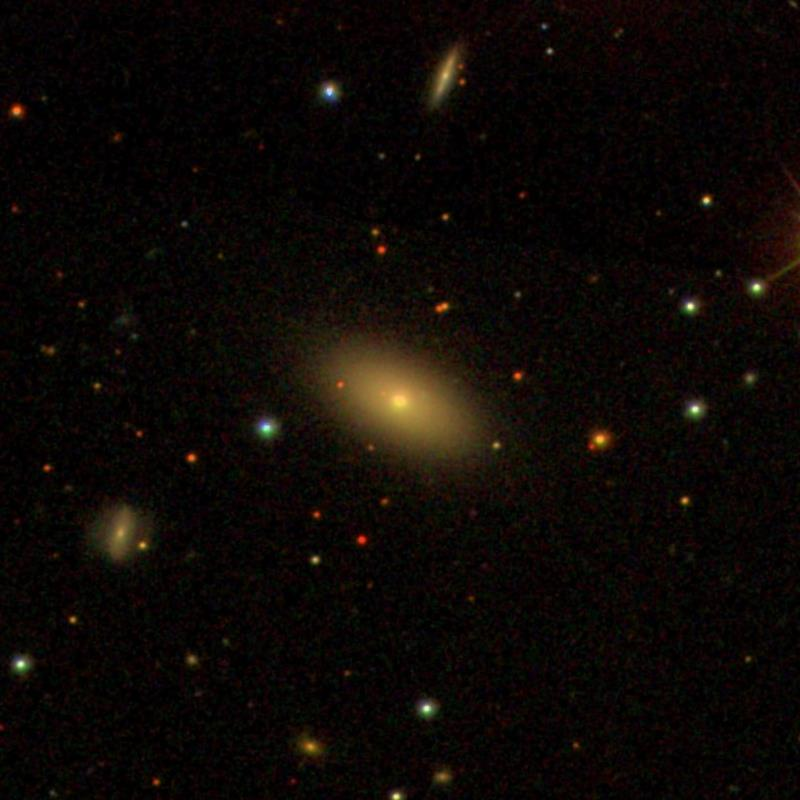
- NGC 7190 by SDSS

Observation data (J2000 epoch)
- Constellation: Pegasus
- Right ascension: 22^{h} 03^{m} 06,6^{s}
- Declination: +11° 11′ 59″
- Redshift: 0.029324 ± 0.000087
- Heliocentric radial velocity: 8,791 ± 26 km/s
- Distance: 390 Mly (120 Mpc)
- Apparent magnitude (V): 13.9

Characteristics
- Type: SB0
- Apparent size (V): 0.9′ × 0.5′

Other designations
- UGC 11885, CGCG 428-019, PGC 67928

NGC 7190 is a barred lenticular galaxy registered in the New General Catalogue. It is located in the constellation Pegasus. It was discovered by the French astronomer Édouard Stephan on 28 September 1870 using an 80.01 cm (31.5 inch) reflector.

== See also ==
- New General Catalogue
- List of NGC objects (7001–7840)
