= NGC 7812 =

Spiral galaxy in the constellation Sculptor

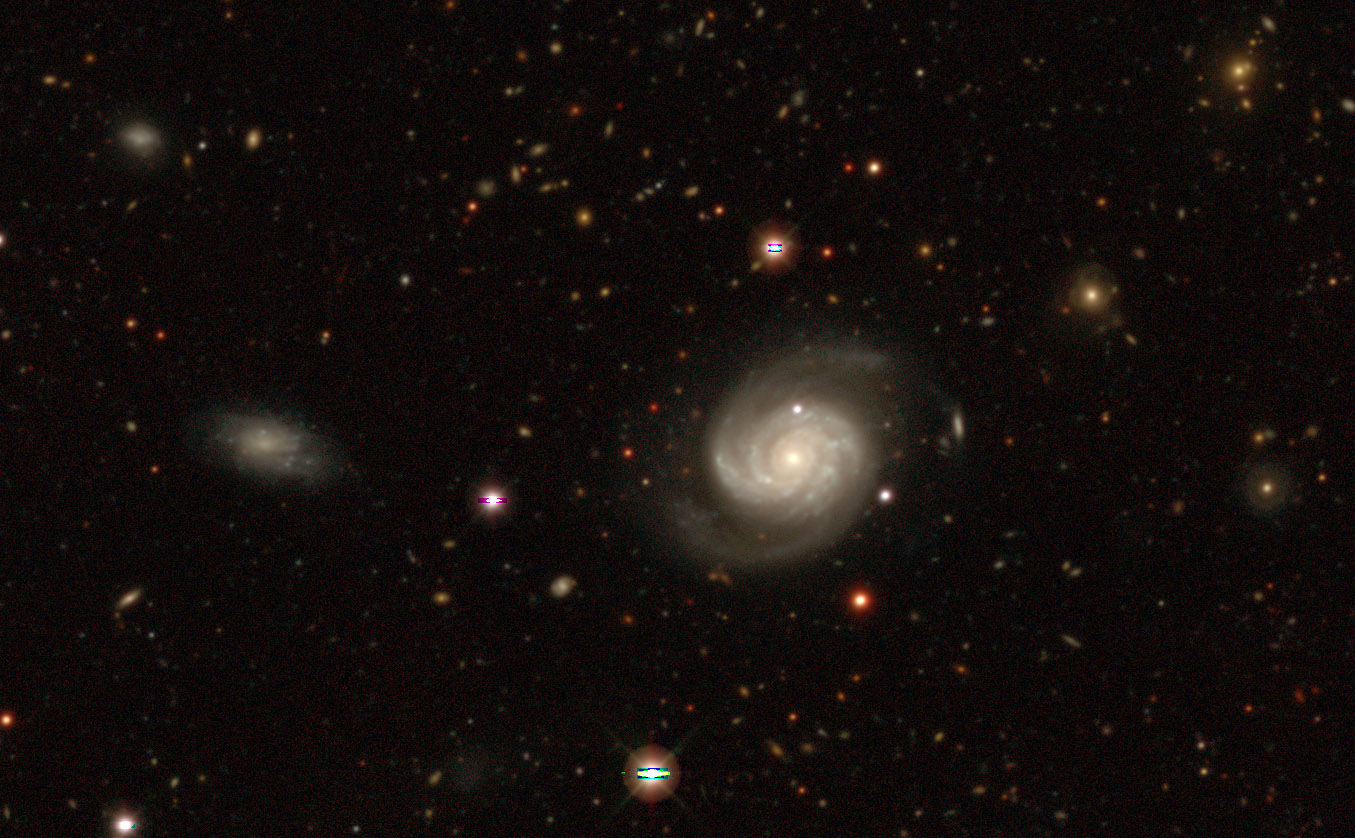

Observation data (J2000 epoch)
- Constellation: Sculptor
- Right ascension: 00^{h} 02^{m} 54.460^{s}
- Declination: −34° 14′ 08.40″
- Redshift: 0.022799
- Heliocentric radial velocity: 6757 ± 19 km/s
- Distance: 314.2 ± 22.0 Mly (96.33 ± 6.76 Mpc)
- Apparent magnitude (B): 13.99

Characteristics
- Type: SAB(rs)b:

Other designations
- MCG -06-01-016, PGC 195

NGC 7812 (also known PGC 195) as is an intermediate spiral galaxy in the constellation Sculptor. The galaxy was discovered on 25 September 1865 by Sir John Hershel. At its widest, it measures approximately 100-thousand light years (30660 parsecs) across, and is 315 million light years away from Earth.

== See also ==
- List of NGC objects (7001–7840)
