= NGC 7059 =

Spiral galaxy in the constellation Pavo

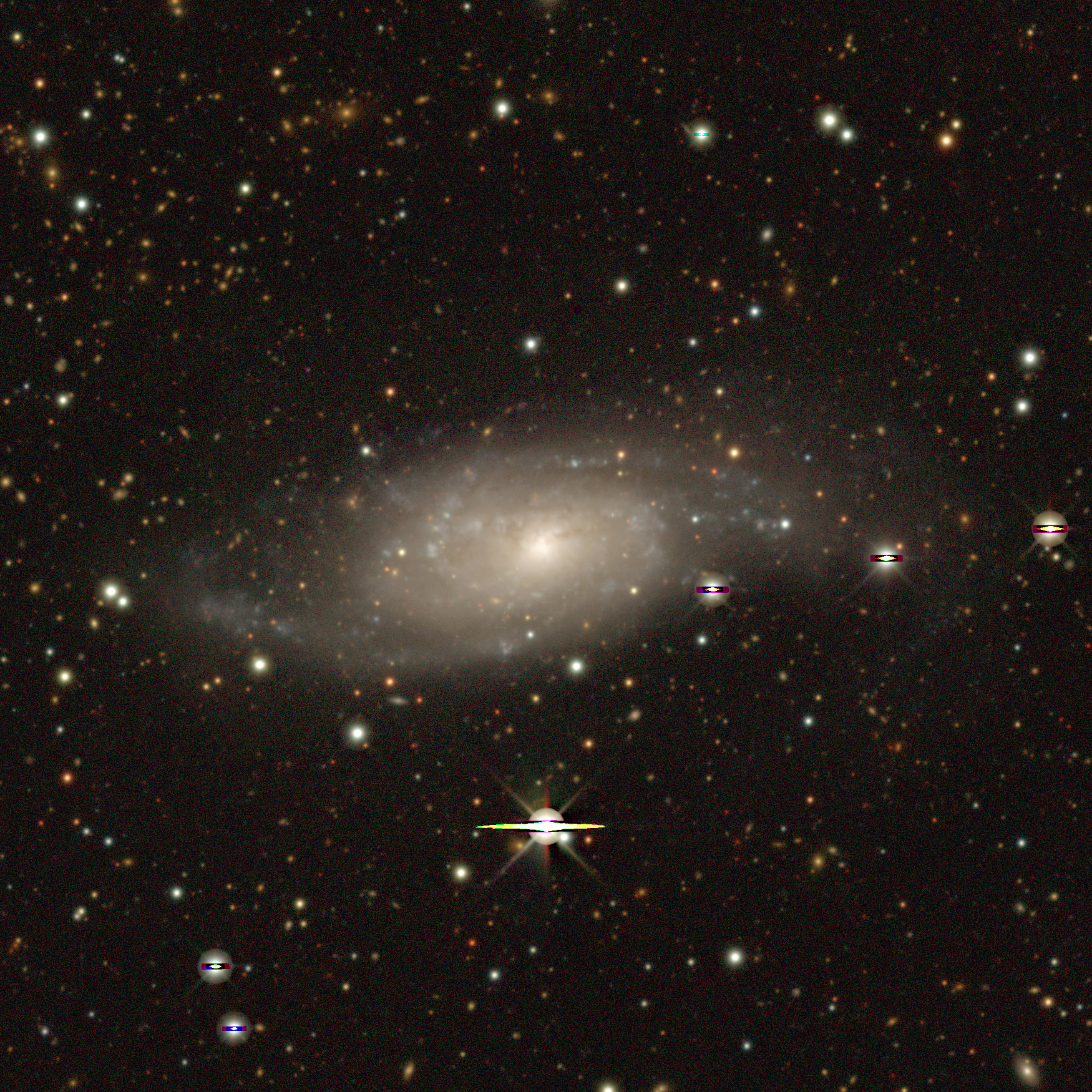
- The spiral galaxy NGC 7059.

Observation data (J2000 epoch)
- Constellation: Pavo
- Right ascension: 21^{h} 27^{m} 21.5^{s}
- Declination: −60° 00′ 52″
- Redshift: 0.005784
- Heliocentric radial velocity: 1,734 km/s
- Distance: 72 Mly
- Apparent magnitude (V): 12.35

Characteristics
- Type: SAB(rs)c
- Apparent size (V): 3.5 x 1.7

Other designations
- ESO 145-5, IRAS 21236-6013, PGC 66784

NGC 7059 is a nearby spiral galaxy located about 70 million light-years away in the constellation of Pavo. NGC 7059 was discovered by astronomer John Herschel on July 22, 1835.

== See also ==
- List of NGC objects (7001–7840)
- NGC 224 – an unrelated spiral galaxy of different morphology
