= NGC 7660 =

Galaxy in the constellation Pegasus

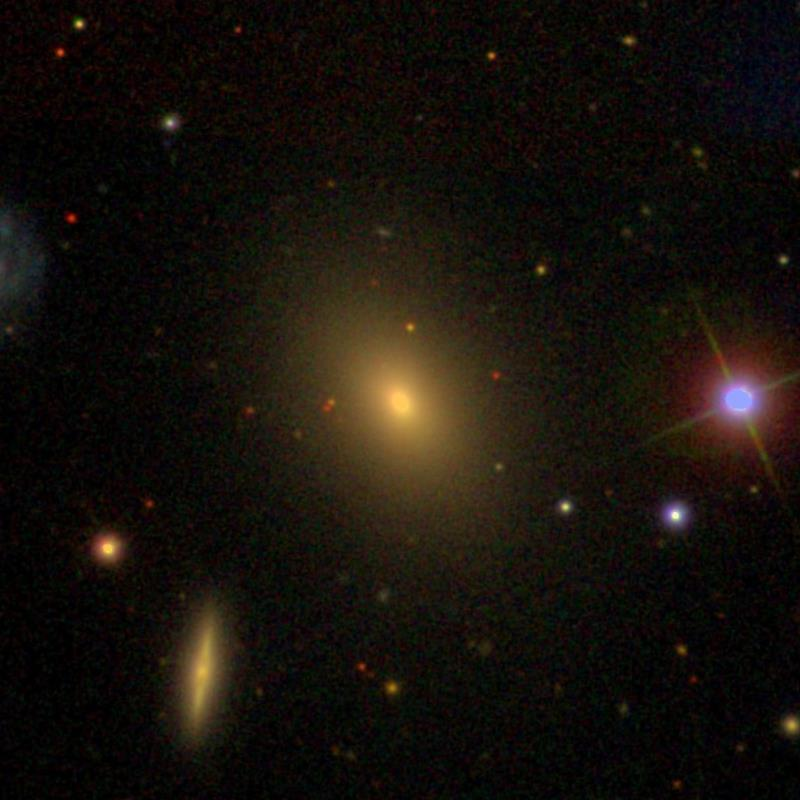
- SDSS image of NGC 7660

Observation data (J2000 epoch)
- Constellation: Pegasus
- Right ascension: 23^{h} 25^{m} 48.6643^{s}
- Declination: +27° 01′ 47.440″
- Redshift: 0.018805
- Heliocentric radial velocity: 5637 ± 13 km/s
- Distance: 179.30 ± 38.17 Mly (54.975 ± 11.703 Mpc)
- Apparent magnitude (V): 12.66

Characteristics
- Type: E
- Apparent size (V): 1.4′ × 1.1′

Other designations
- UGC 12594, MCG +04-55-012, PGC 71413

NGC 7660 is an elliptical galaxy located in the constellation of Pegasus. It was discovered by the astronomer John Herschel on September 5, 1828.
