= NGC 7028 =

Astronomical object in the constellation Delphinus

UGC 11676

Observation data (J2000 epoch)
- Constellation: Delphinus
- Right ascension: 21^{h} 05^{m} 50.0^{s}
- Declination: +18° 28′ 05″
- Redshift: 0.016315
- Heliocentric radial velocity: 4,891 km/s
- Apparent magnitude (B): 14.8

Characteristics
- Type: S?
- Apparent size (V): 1.0′ × 0.4′

Other designations
- NGC 7028, UGC 11676, MCG +03-53-015, PGC 66087

NGC 7028 is the designation of a celestial object in the constellation of Delphinus. The object was supposedly discovered by the German astronomer Albert Marth on 17 September 1863. However, its identification is uncertain, and the object is considered lost. No galaxies or nebulous objects are at the coordinates that he gave.

One candidate is a spiral galaxy designated UGC 11676, or CGCG 448-039. It has an apparent magnitude of 14.8, and is "very faint, small, very little extended", just as Marth described. While the declination of this object matches that of Marth's description, the right ascension is 2.5 arcminutes off.
