= NGC 7725 =

Galaxy in the constellation Aquarius

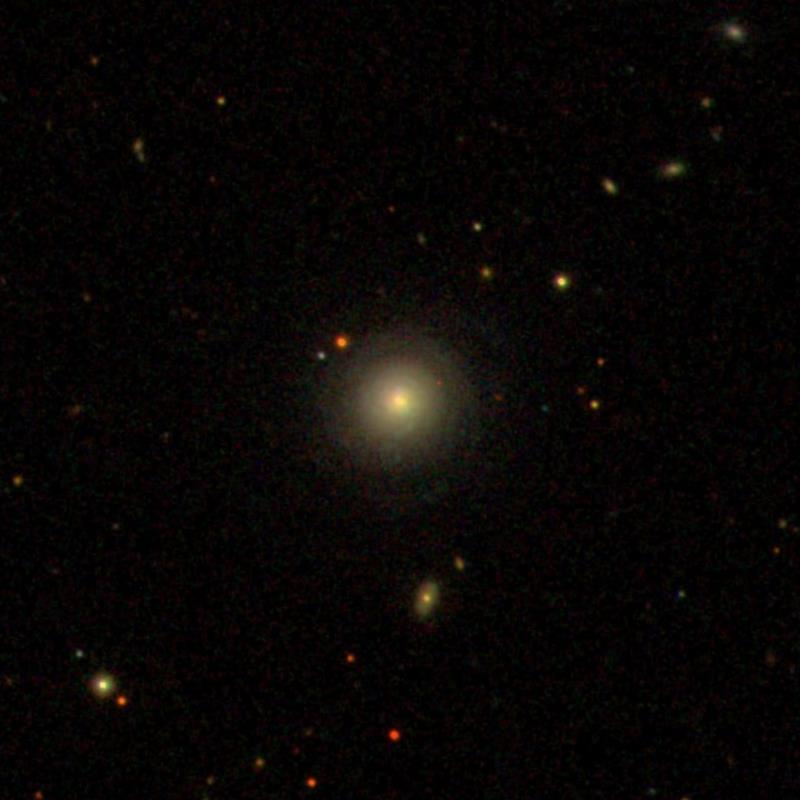

Observation data
- Constellation: Aquarius
- Right ascension: 23^{h} 40^{m} 35^{s}
- Declination: −04° 23′ 43″

NGC 7725 is a lenticular galaxy located in the constellation Aquarius. It was discovered on September 20, 1784 by the astronomer William Herschel.
