= NGC 7332 =

Edge-on peculiar lenticular galaxy in the constellation Pegasus

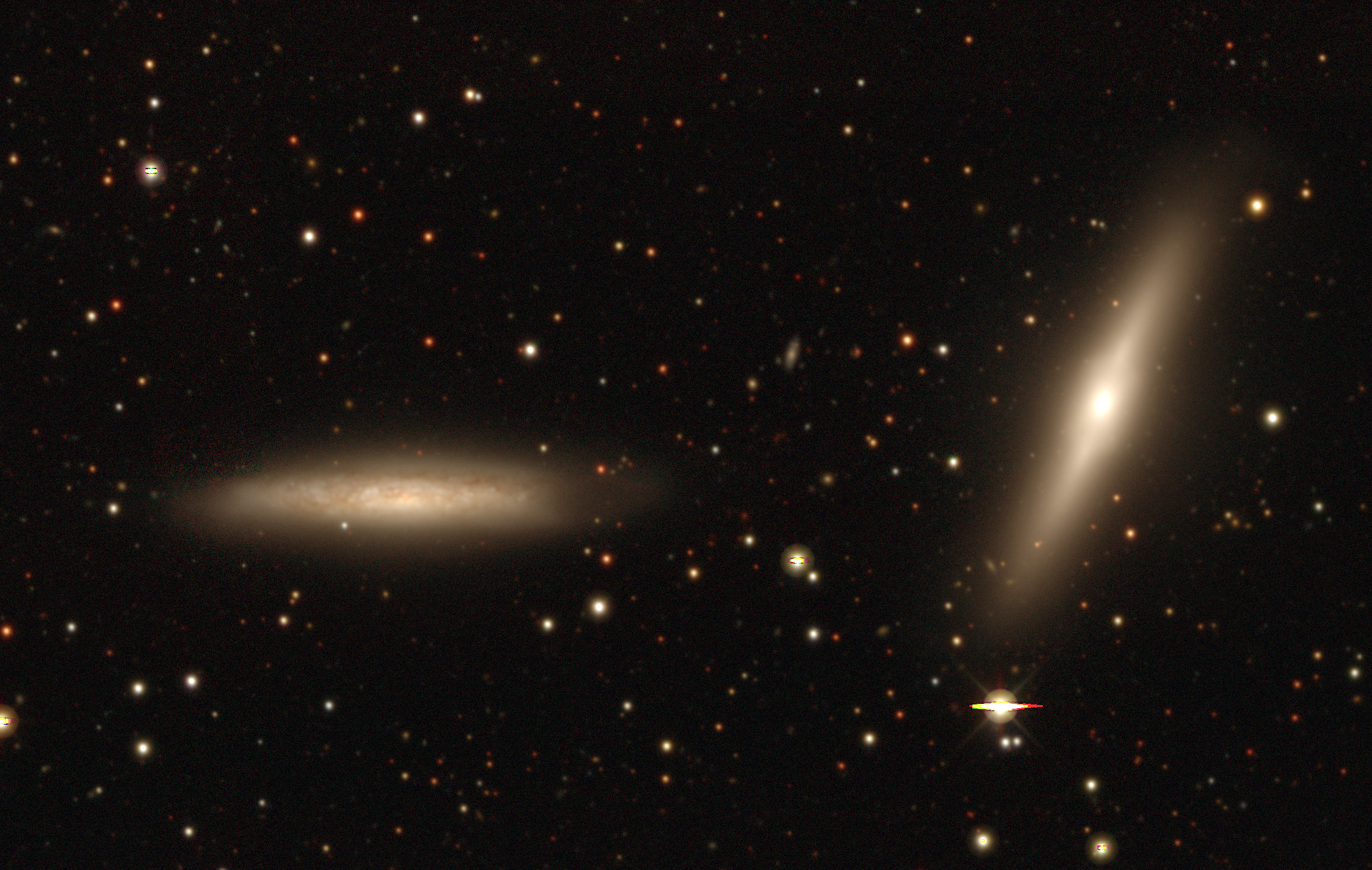
- legacy surveys image of NGC 7332 (right) and NGC 7339 (left)

Observation data (J2000 epoch)
- Constellation: Pegasus
- Right ascension: 22^{h} 37^{m} 24.5^{s}
- Declination: +23° 47′ 54″
- Redshift: 0.003909
- Heliocentric radial velocity: 1197 ± 5 km/s
- Distance: 67.1 ± 11 Mly (20.6 ± 3.4 Mpc)
- Apparent magnitude (V): 12.0
- Apparent magnitude (B): 12.0
- Magnitude (J): 8.918
- Magnitude (H): 8.253
- Magnitude (K): 8.012

Characteristics
- Type: S0 pec edge-on lenticular galaxy
- Apparent size (V): 4.1' × 1.1'

Other designations
- UGC 12115, MCG +04-53-008, PGC 69342

NGC 7332 is an edge-on peculiar lenticular galaxy located about 67 million light-years away in the constellation Pegasus. It possesses a (peanut shell)-shaped bulge, associated with stellar bar. It was discovered on September 19, 1784, by the astronomer William Herschel.

NGC 7332 and NGC 7339 form a dynamically isolated binary system (number 570 in the catalog of double galaxies compiled by Igor Karachentsev), and are likely orbiting each other. NGC 7332 is the brighter of the two galaxies. NGC 7332 is state as Holm 796 together with NGC 7339.

In the sky NGC 7339 lies 5' away from NGC 7332. NGC 7332 is an unusually blue object with a corrected apparent B-magnitude of 11.5. A 130mm to 200mm telescope will be needed to visually detect this pair of galaxies. The two galaxies will appear at almost a right angle to one another.
