= NGC 7050 =

Star cluster in the constellation Cygnus

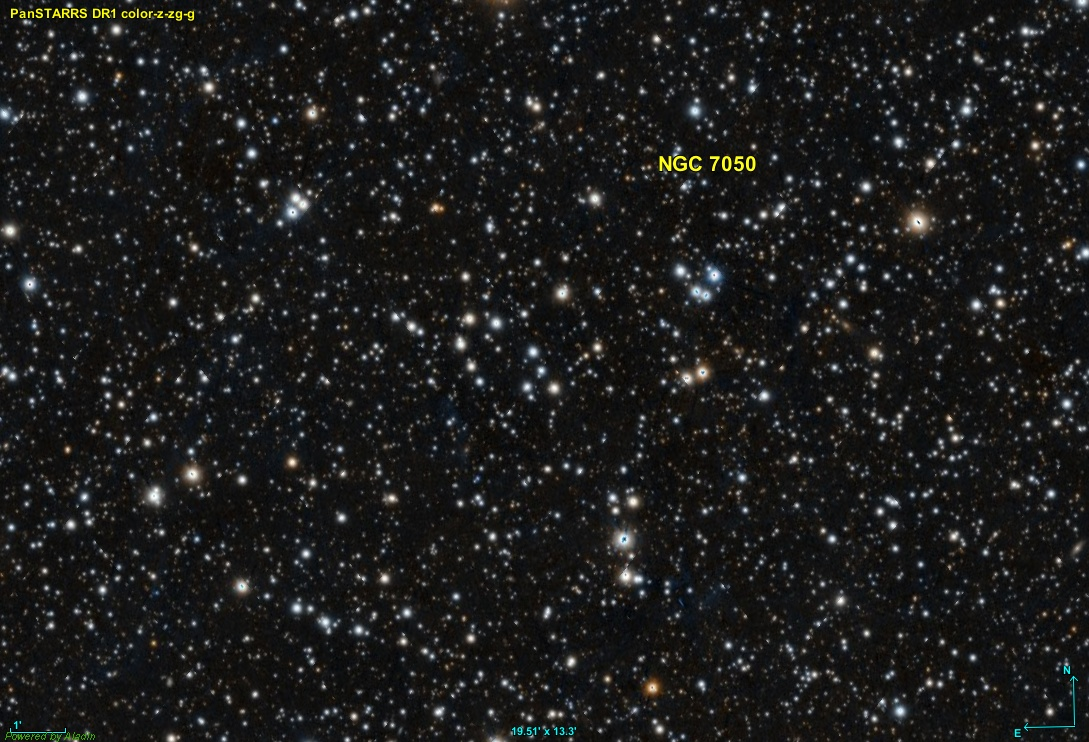
- The open cluster NGC 7050

Observation data (J2000 epoch)
- Right ascension: 21^{h} 15^{m} 08.5546^{s}
- Declination: +36° 10′ 30.909″
- Distance: 1,685 (5,490)

Physical characteristics

Associations
- Constellation: Cygnus

NGC 7050 is an open cluster located in the constellation Cygnus. It is situated north of the celestial equator and, as such, it is more easily visible from the northern hemisphere. It was discovered by 19th century English astronomer John Herschel on 19 August 1828. The object is located 5,490 light-years (1,685 pc) from the Earth.
