= NGC 7772 =

Group of unrelated stars in the constellation Pegasus

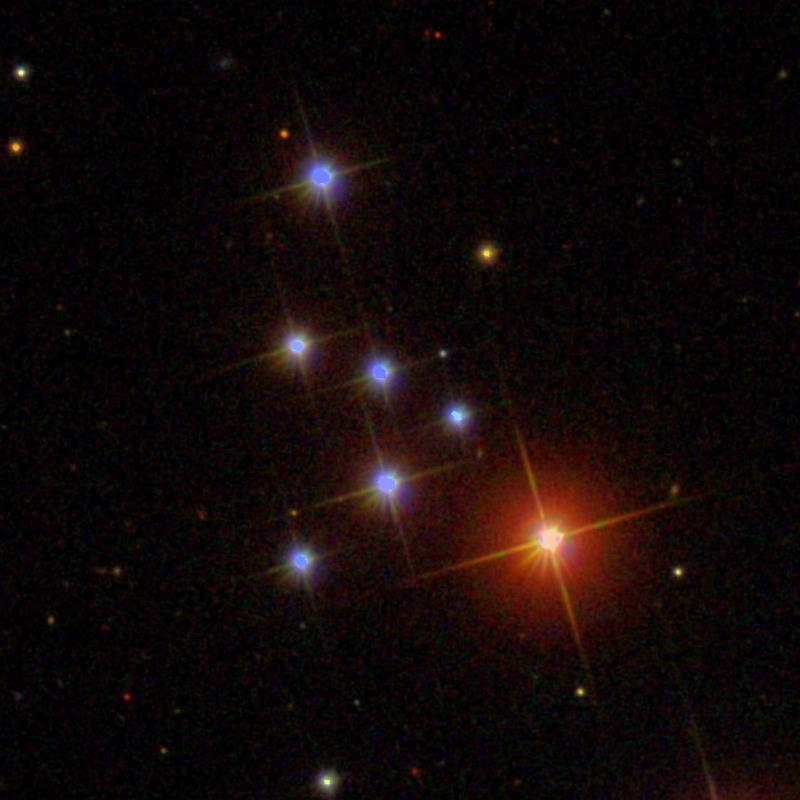
- NGC 7772; Credit: SDSS DR14

Observation data (J2000 epoch)
- Right ascension: 23^{h} 51^{m} 46.0^{s}
- Declination: +16° 14′ 48″
- Distance: 4900 ly (1500 pc)
- Apparent dimensions (V): 3.0′

Physical characteristics
- Estimated age: 1.5 Gyr
- Not a cluster
- Other designations: C 2349+159, OCl 230

Associations
- Constellation: Pegasus

NGC 7772 is collection of stars in the constellation Pegasus that were thought to be an open cluster. The stars were first recorded on 7 October 1825 by the British astronomer John Herschel. Gaia data shows stars in the area are unrelated.

== See also ==
- List of NGC objects
