= NGC 7600 =

Galaxy in the constellation Aquarius

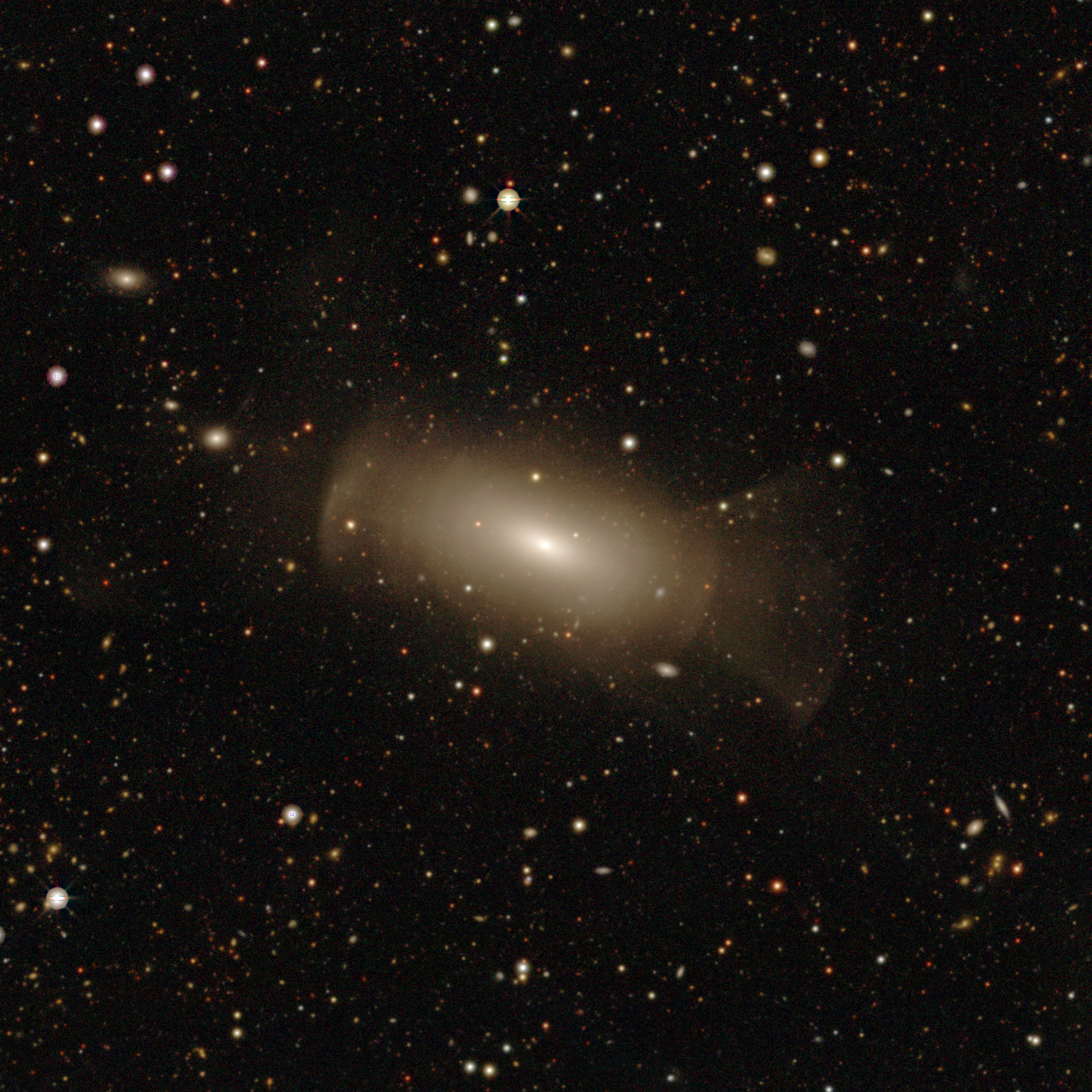
- NGC 7600 (legacy surveys)

Observation data (J2000 epoch)
- Constellation: Aquarius
- Right ascension: 23^{h} 18^{m} 53.8^{s}
- Declination: −07° 34′ 50″
- Redshift: 0.011618
- Apparent magnitude (V): 12.95

Characteristics
- Type: S0
- Apparent size (V): 2.5' × 1.1'

Other designations
- MCG -01-59-019, 2MASX J23185385-0734495, 6dF J2318539-073450, PGC 71029

NGC 7600 is a galaxy about 160 million light-years from Earth, located in the constellation Aquarius. It is classified as a lenticular galaxy, or, more formally, an S0 galaxy.

== Gallery ==
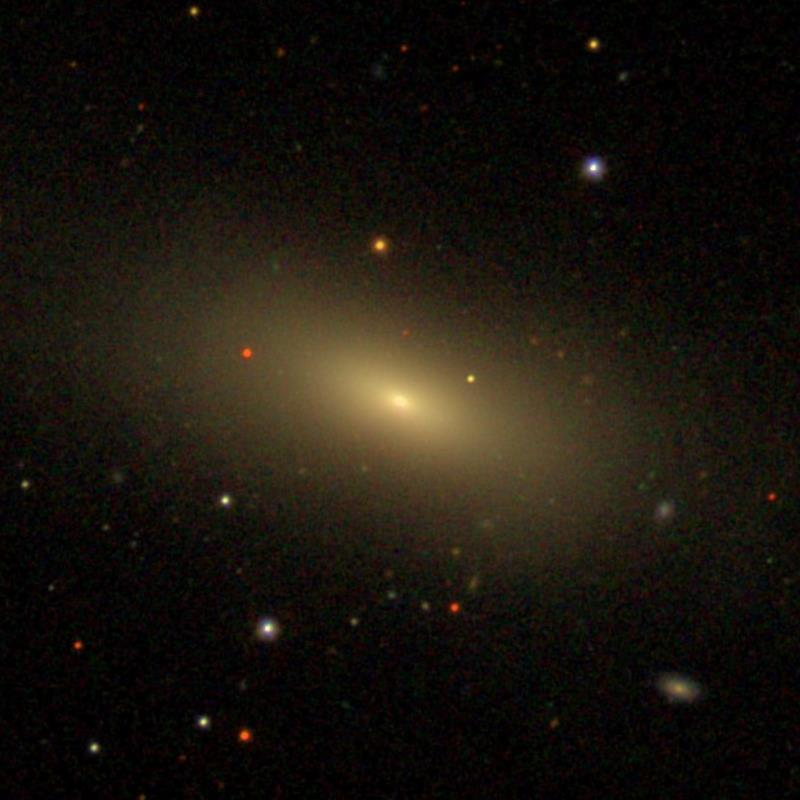
SDSS image of NGC 7600
