= NGC 7701 =

Lenticular galaxy in the Pisces constellation

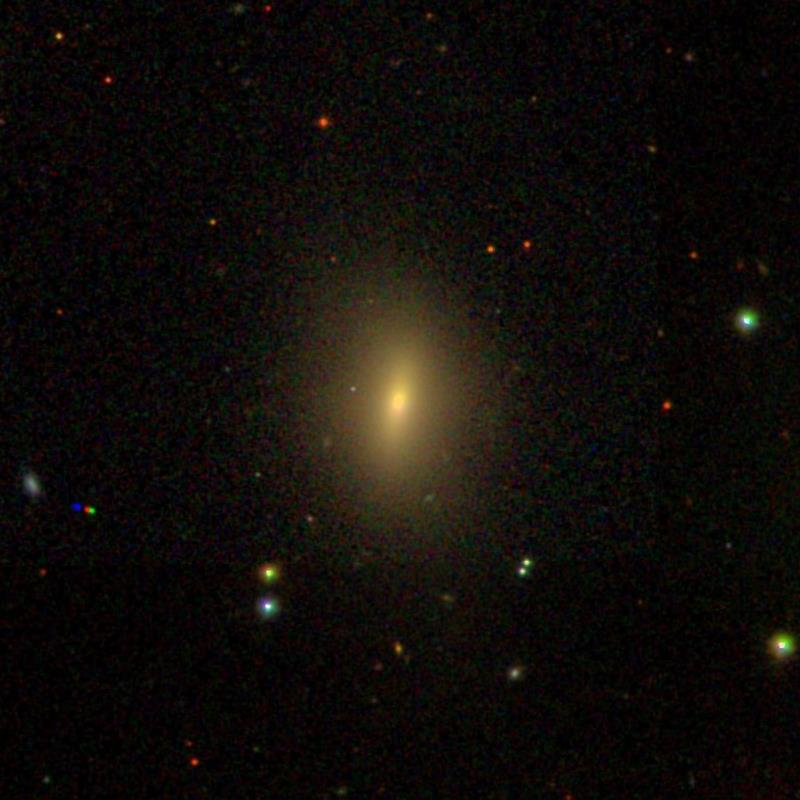
- Image of NGC 7701 from SDSS

Observation data (J2000 epoch)
- Constellation: Pisces
- Right ascension: 23h 35m 51s
- Declination: -02° 42’ 43”
- Redshift: 5300 ± 24
- Group or cluster: LGG 476
- Absolute magnitude (B): 14
- magnitude (J): 10.82
- magnitude (H): 10.12
- magnitude (K): 9.84

Characteristics
- Type: Lenticular

Other designations
- PGC 71777; MCG -01-60-007; WISEA J233431.52-025115.3; 2MASX J23343148-0251152; 2MASS J23343150-0251155

NGC 7701 is a lenticular galaxy located in the constellation of Pisces. It is situated close to the celestial equator making it at least partially visible on both hemispheres.

It is part of galaxy group known as LGG 476. LGG 476 has at least 4 known members, which are IC 1476, MCG 1-60-5, NGC 7701 and IC 1501.
