= NGC 7093 =

Star cluster in the constellation Cygnus

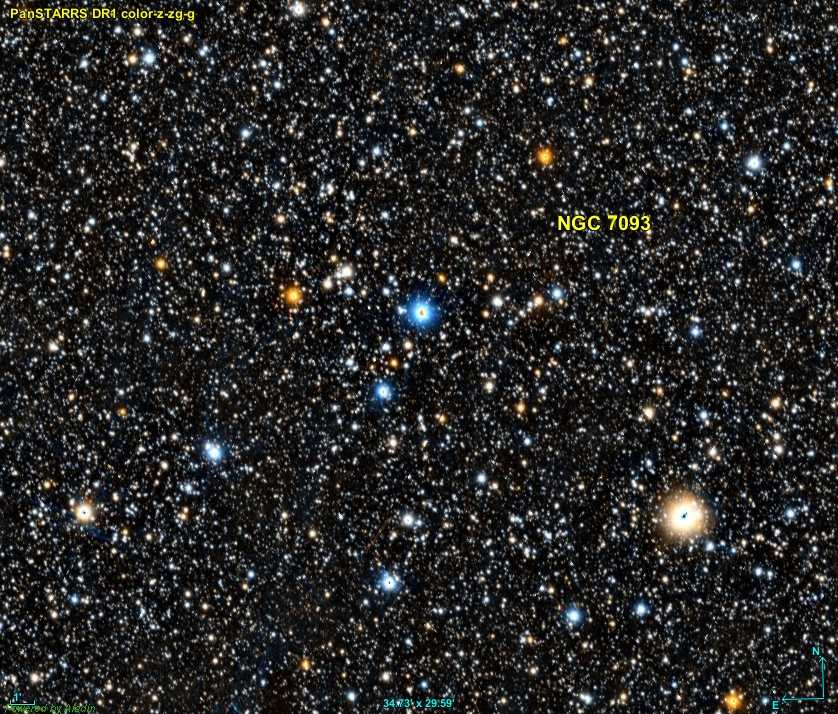
- The open cluster NGC 7093 in the Pan-STARRS survey

Observation data (J2000 epoch)
- Right ascension: 21^{h} 34^{m} 21,0^{s}
- Declination: +45° 57′ 54″
- Distance: 5,822 ± 267 ly (1,785 ± 82 pc)
- Apparent dimensions (V): 13′

Physical characteristics

Associations
- Constellation: Cygnus

NGC 7093 is an open cluster located in the constellation Cygnus. It was discovered by John Herschel on September 19, 1829. It is located at a distance of about 5,800 light-years from the Sun and 28,400 light-years from the Galactic Center.
