= NGC 7773 =

Galaxy in the constellation Pegasus

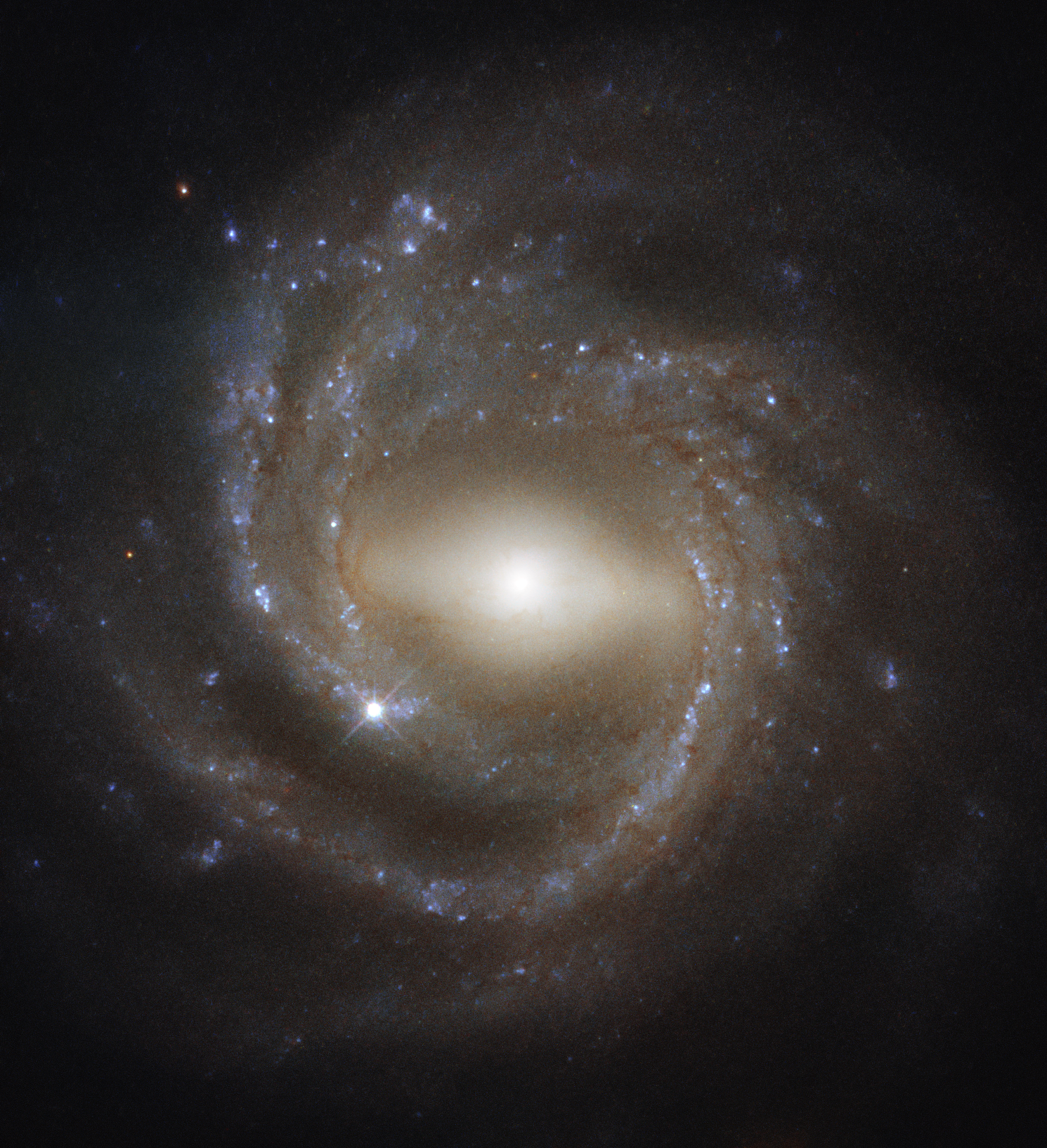
- NGC 7773 taken by Hubble.

Observation data (J2000 epoch)
- Constellation: Pegasus
- Right ascension: 23^{h} 52^{m} 09.873^{s}
- Declination: +31° 16′ 35.68″
- Redshift: 0.027999
- Heliocentric radial velocity: 8276km/s
- Distance: 392.55 Mly
- Apparent magnitude (B): 14.5

Characteristics
- Type: SBb

Other designations
- IRAS F23495+3059, IRAS 23496+3059, LEDA 72681, 2MASX J23520987+3116356, MCG+05-56-015, UGC 12820, UZC J235209.9+311636, Z 498-22, Z 2349.7+3100

NGC 7773 is a barred spiral galaxy located in the constellation of Pegasus at an approximate distance of 400 million light years. NGC 7773 was discovered on October 9, 1790 by William Herschel.

== See also ==
- Galaxy

== Gallery ==
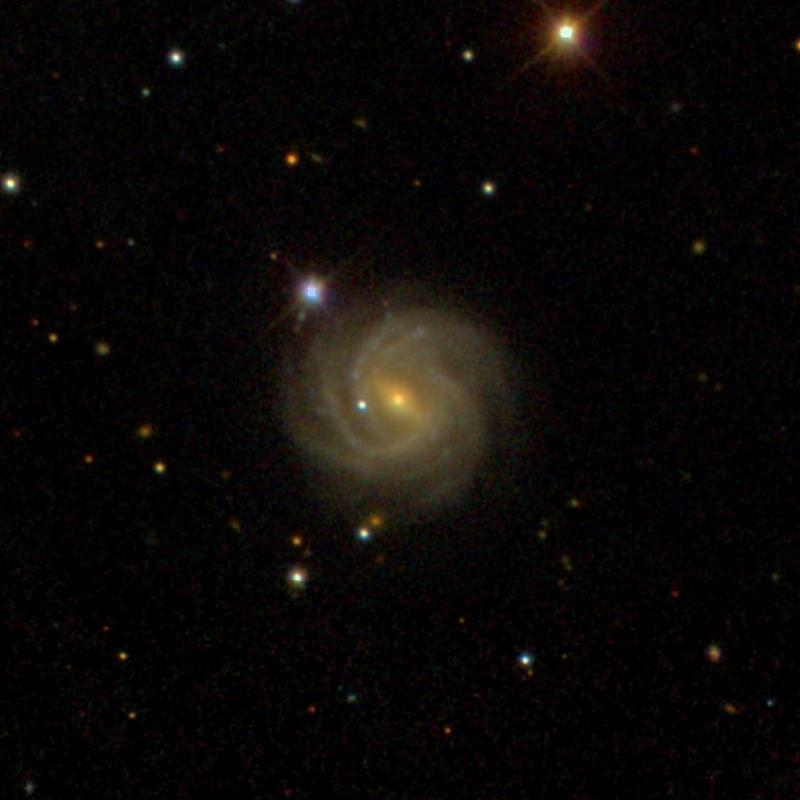
NGC 7773 (SDSS DR14)
