= NGC 7802 =

NGC object

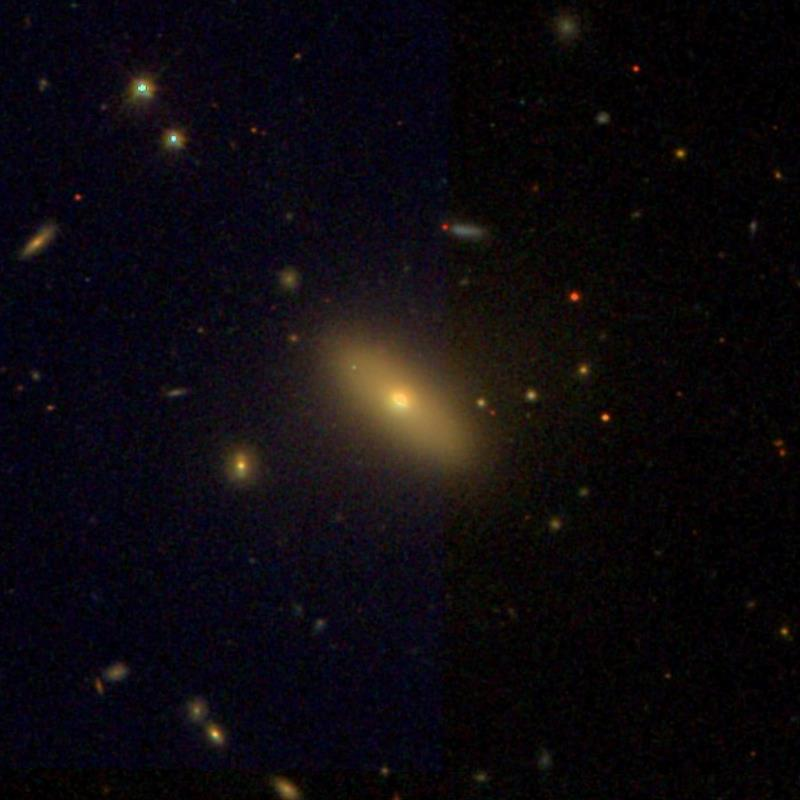

Observation data
- Constellation: Pisces
- Right ascension: 00^{h} 01^{m} 00^{s}
- Declination: +06° 14′ 31″
- Surface brightness: 23.77 mag/arcsec^{2}

Characteristics
- Type: S0

NGC 7802 is a lenticular galaxy in the constellation Pisces. It was discovered on September 25, 1830 by the astronomer John Herschel, and is considered an active galactic nucleus candidate.
