= NGC 7706 =

Lenticular galaxy in the Pisces constellation

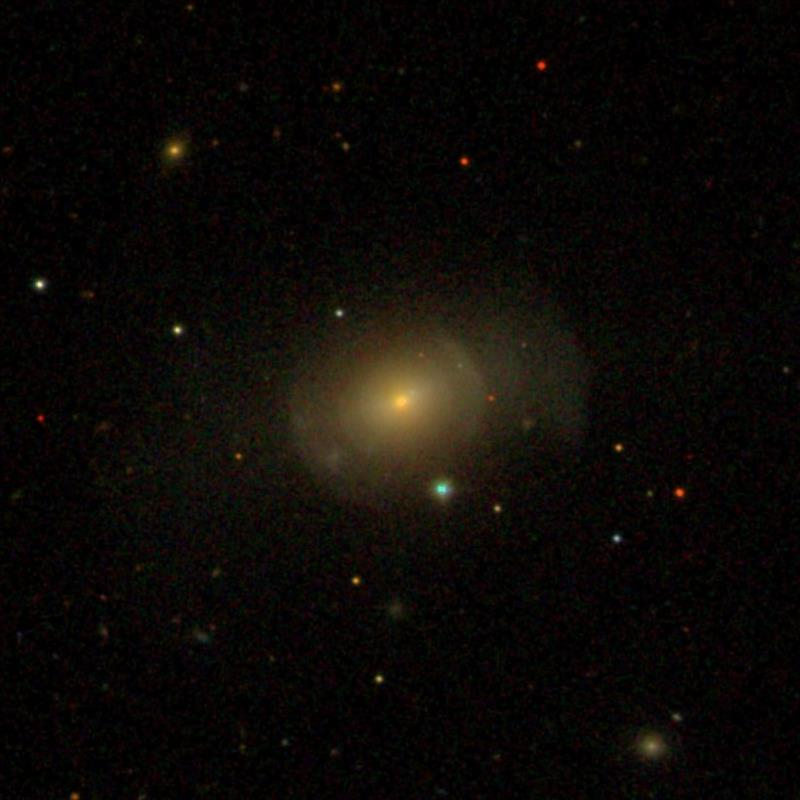
- NGC 7706 (SDSS DR14)

Observation data (J2000.0 epoch)
- Constellation: Pisces
- Right ascension: 23^{h} 35^{m} 10.4^{s}
- Declination: +04° 57′ 51″

NGC 7706 is a lenticular galaxy in the constellation Pisces, first observed by British astronomer John Herschel on 16 October 1827 during his surveys of the southern and equatorial sky.
