= NGC 7011 =

Open star cluster in the Cygnus constellation

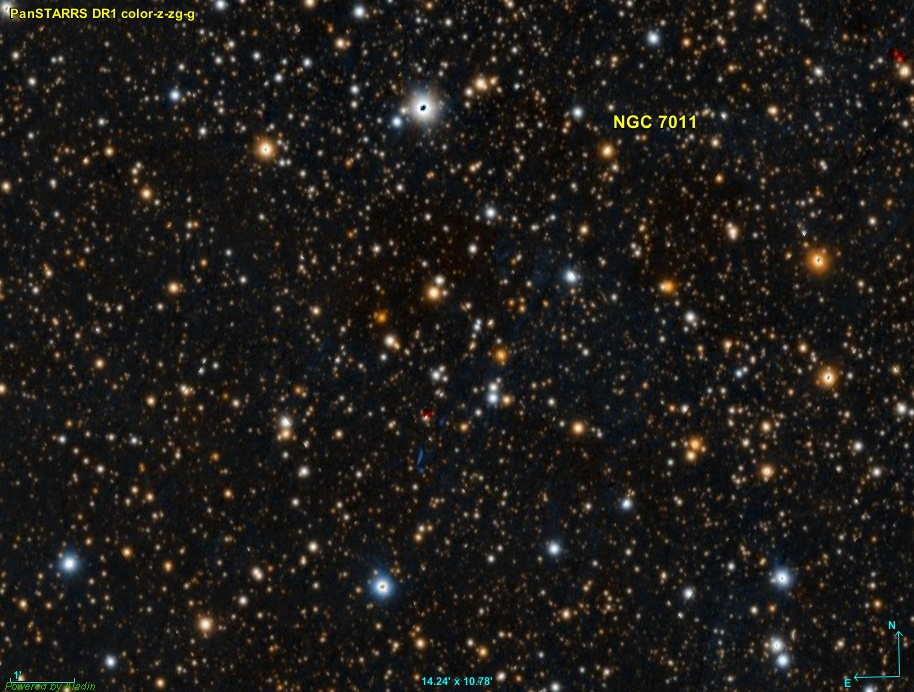

Observation data (J2000 epoch)
- Right ascension: 21h 02m 41s
- Declination: +47° 27’ 22”

Physical characteristics

Associations
- Constellation: Cygnus
- Galaxy: Milky Way

NGC 7011 is an open star cluster located in the constellation of Cygnus.
