= NGC 7068 =

Galaxy in the constellation Pegasus

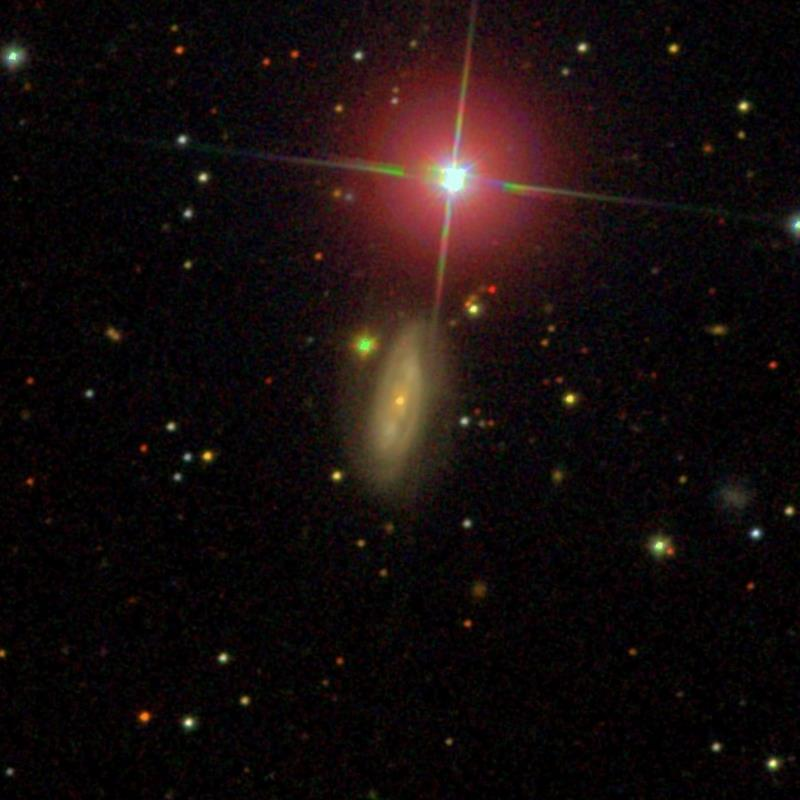
- SDSS image of NGC 7068

Observation data (J2000 epoch)
- Constellation: Pegasus
- Right ascension: 21^{h} 26^{m} 32.4^{s}
- Declination: 12° 11′ 03″
- Redshift: 0.017463
- Heliocentric radial velocity: 5,235 km/s
- Distance: 216 Mly
- Apparent magnitude (V): 17.7

Characteristics
- Type: Sc
- Apparent size (V): 0.10 x 0.09

Other designations
- CGCG 426-55, IRAS 21241+1158, KAZ 520, MCG 2-54-27, PGC 66765

NGC 7068 is a spiral galaxy located about 215 million light-years away in the constellation of Pegasus. NGC 7068 was discovered by astronomer Albert Marth on November 7, 1863.

On June 26, 2013 a Type Ia supernova designated as SN 2013ei was discovered in NGC 7068.
