= NGC 7459 =

Twin spiral galaxy in the constellation Pisces

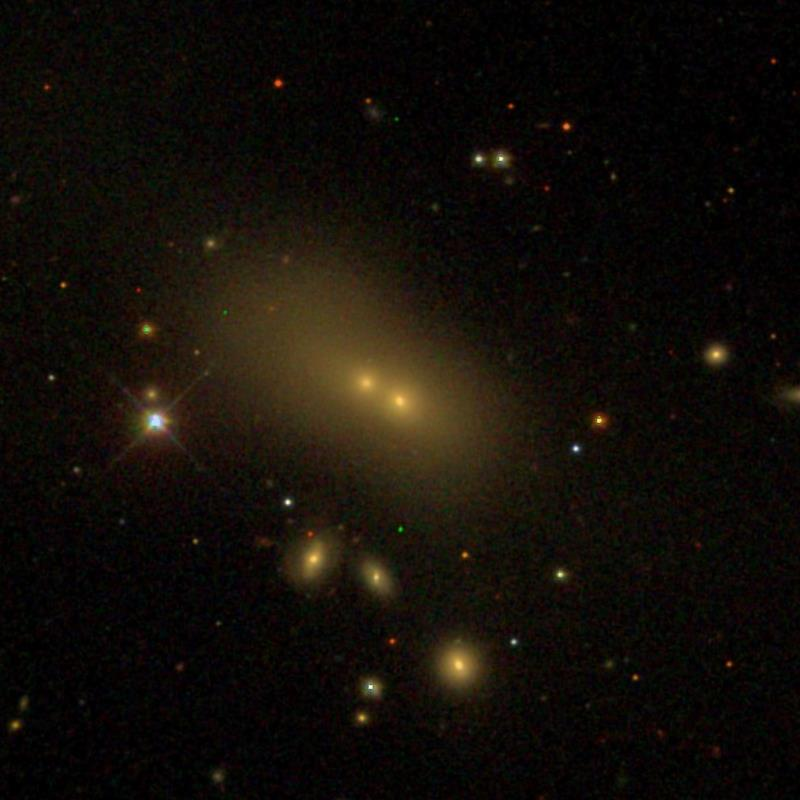
- NGC 7459 (SDSS DR14)

Observation data (J2000 epoch)
- Constellation: Pisces
- Right ascension: 23^{h} 01^{m} 31^{s}
- Declination: 06° 48′ 26″

Characteristics
- Type: Spiral

Other designations
- PGC 70261; UGC 12302

NGC 7459 is a twin spiral galaxy of magnitude 15.2 located within the constellation Pisces. It was discovered by Lewis Swift in 1886 with a 16-inch refractor. The galactic nuclei are only 15 arcsec apart.
