= NGC 7522 =

Object in the constellation Aquarius with disputed identity

Observation data Epoch J2000.0 Equinox J2000.0 (ICRS)
- Constellation: Aquarius
- Right ascension: 23^{h} 15^{m} 36.4^{s}
- Declination: −22° 53′ 42″

NGC 7522 is an astronomical object whose identity is in question. It was originally catalogued as a faint nebula. Although SIMBAD identifies it as PGC 70742, this is unlikely, due to the faintness of the galaxy. Instead, it is possible that a nearby star was accidentally catalogued as a nebula.
