= NGC 7055 =

Star cluster in the constellation Cepheus

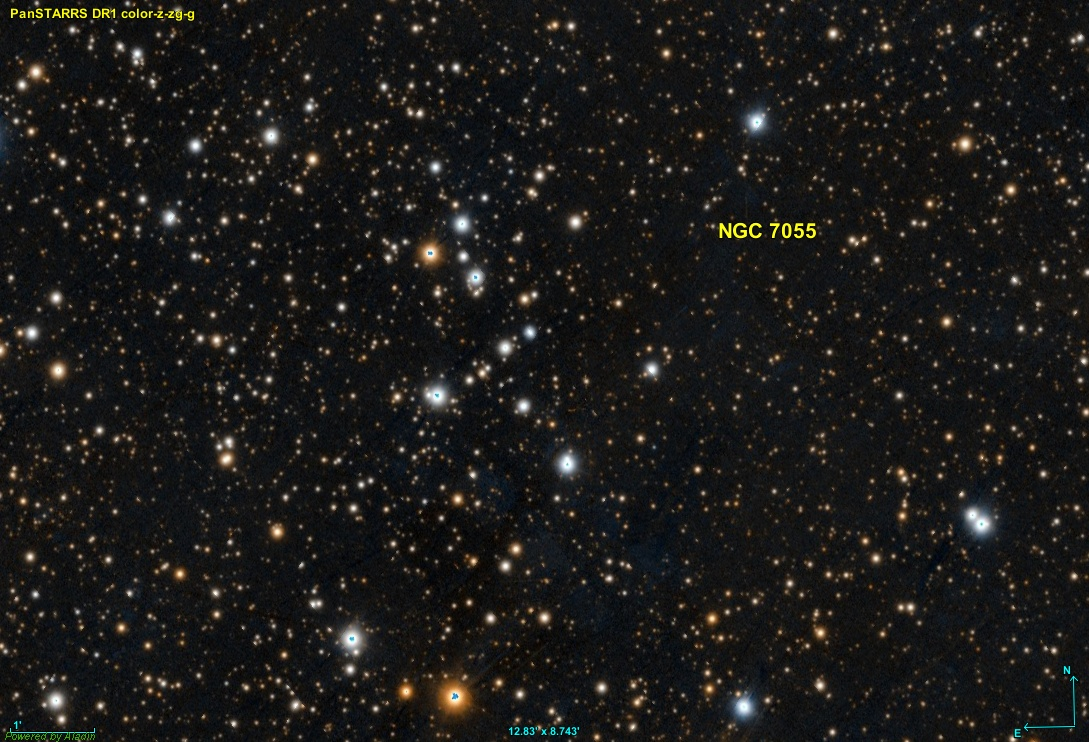
- The open cluster NGC 7055

Observation data (J2000 epoch)
- Right ascension: 21^{h} 19^{m} 30.1073^{s}
- Declination: +57° 32′ 44.160″
- Distance: 7,341.78 ly (2,251 pc)

Physical characteristics

Associations
- Constellation: Cepheus

NGC 7055 is an open cluster located in the constellation Cepheus. It was discovered by 19th century English astronomer John Herschel on 25 September 1829. It is located approximately 7,340 light years, (2251 pc), from the Earth.
