= NGC 7191 =

Spiral galaxy in the constellation Indus

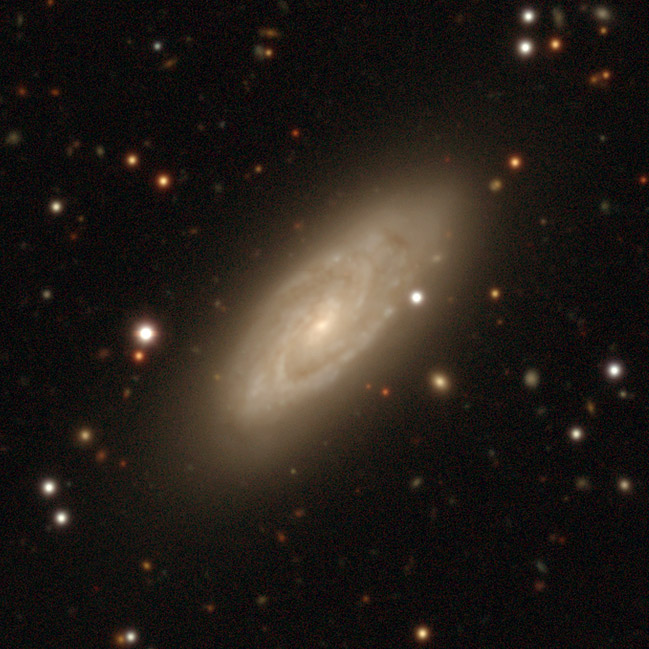
- NGC 7191

Observation data (J2000 epoch)
- Constellation: Indus
- Right ascension: 22^{h} 06^{m} 52.8^{s}
- Declination: −64° 38′ 04″
- Redshift: 0.009790 ± 0.000033
- Heliocentric radial velocity: 2,935 ± 10 km/s
- Distance: 119 ± 10 Mly (36.5 ± 3.1 Mpc)
- Apparent magnitude (V): 13.1

Characteristics
- Type: SAB(rs)c
- Apparent size (V): 1.6′ × 0.6′

Other designations
- ESO 108- G013, PGC 68059

NGC 7191 is a spiral galaxy registered in the New General Catalogue. It is located in the constellation Indus. It was discovered by the English astronomer John Herschel in 1835 using a 47.5 cm (18.7 inch) reflector. It is a member of the galaxy group known as the NGC 7192 group, named after its brightest member, NGC 7192. Other members of the group include NGC 7179, and NGC 7219.

== See also ==
- New General Catalogue
