= NGC 7024 =

Star cluster in the constellation Cygnus

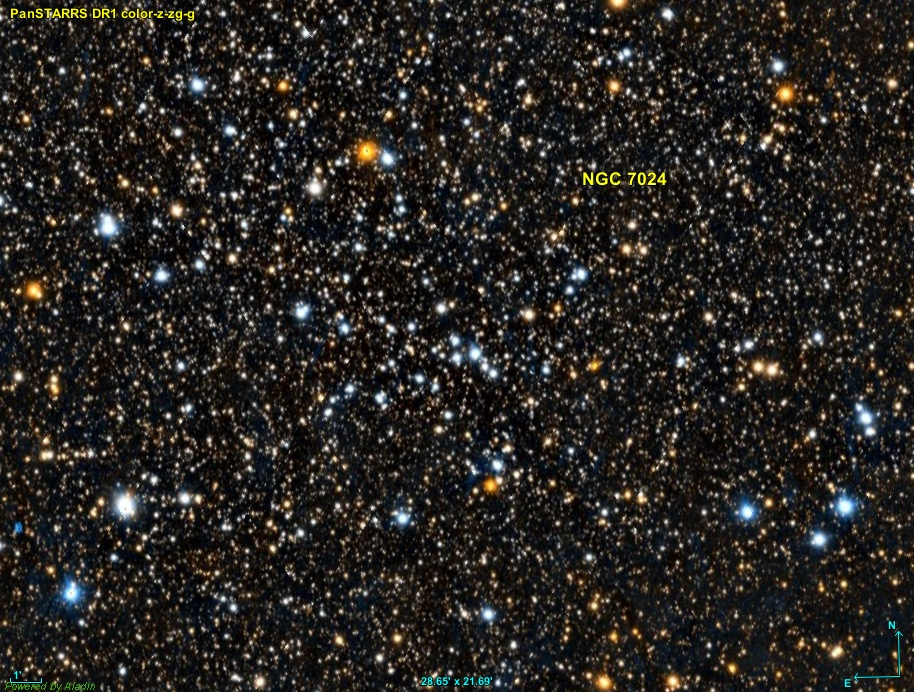
- The open cluster NGC 7024

Observation data (J2000 epoch)
- Right ascension: 21^{h} 07^{m} 06^{s}
- Declination: +41° 35′ 20″
- Distance: 3,930.18 (1,205)

Physical characteristics

Associations
- Constellation: Cygnus

NGC 7024 (also known as [KPS2012] MWSC 3465) is an open cluster located in the constellation Cygnus containing approximately 139 stars. NGC 7024 is situated to the north of the celestial equator, making it more visible from the northern hemisphere. It was discovered by 19th century English astronomer William Herschel on 17 October 1786. NGC 7024 is moving towards the Sun with a radial velocity of -10.285 km/s. It is located approximately 3930 light years, (1205 pc), from the Earth.
