= NGC 7037 =

Star cluster in the constellation Cygnus

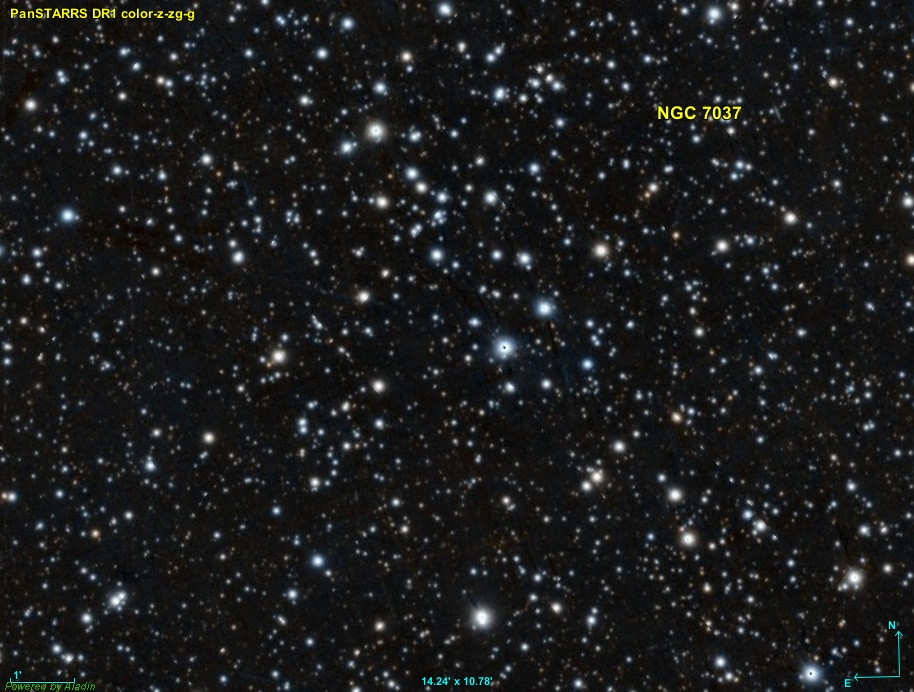
- The open cluster NGC 7037

Observation data (J2000 epoch)
- Right ascension: 21^{h} 11^{m} 49^{s}
- Declination: +33° 50′ 04″
- Distance: 11,444.83 (3,509)

Physical characteristics

Associations
- Constellation: Cygnus

NGC 7037 (also known as [KPS2012] MWSC 3477) is an open cluster located in the constellation Cygnus. It is situated north of the celestial equator and, as such, it is more easily visible from the northern hemisphere. It was discovered by 19th century English astronomer William Herschel on 5 August 1829. It is located approximately 11,444 light years, (3509 pc), from the Earth.
