= NGC 7429 =

Open cluster in the constellation Cepheus

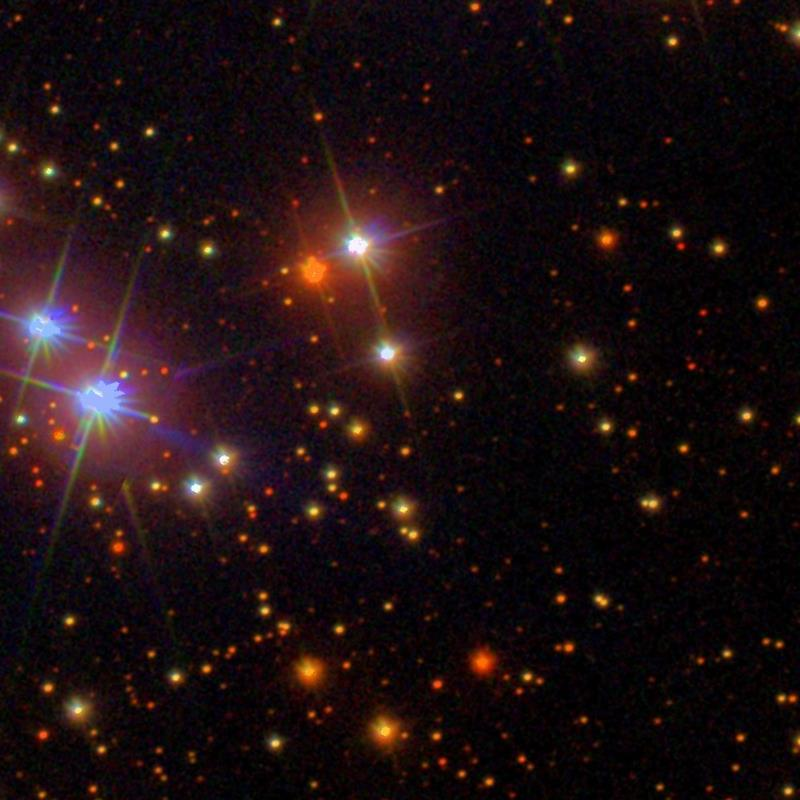
- SDSS image of NGC 7429

Observation data (J2000 epoch)
- Right ascension: 22^{h} 55^{m} 53.28^{s}
- Declination: 59° 57^{m} 36^{s}
- Distance: 4080 ly (1250 pc)
- Apparent dimensions (V): 15′

Physical characteristics
- Estimated age: 120 Gyr
- Other designations: OCL 249

Associations
- Constellation: Cepheus

NGC 7429 is an open cluster in the constellation Cepheus. The object was discovered on 29 September 1829 by the British astronomer John Herschel.
