= NGC 7777 =

Lenticular galaxy located in the constellation Pegasus

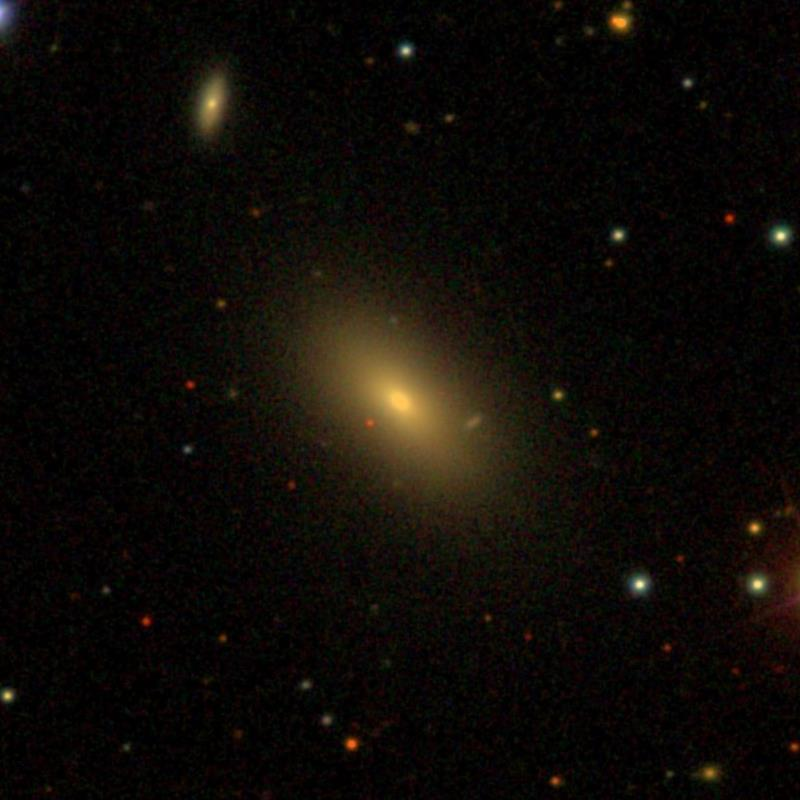
- An image of NGC 7777 from the Sloan Digital Sky Survey

Observation data (J2000 epoch)
- Constellation: Virgo
- Right ascension: 23^{h} 53^{m} 12.4987^{s}
- Declination: +28° 17′ 00.602″
- Redshift: 6650 ± 36 km/s
- Distance: 319.8mly
- Apparent magnitude (V): 14.5

Characteristics
- Type: G

Other designations

NGC 7777 (also known as UGC 12829 and PGC 72744) is a lenticular galaxy located in the constellation Pegasus. NGC 7777 is situated north of the celestial equator and, as such, it is more easily visible from the northern hemisphere. Given its visual magnitude of 14.5, NGC 7777 is visible with the help of a telescope having an aperture of 20 inches (500mm) or more. Its velocity with respect to the cosmic microwave background is 6650 ± 36 km/s, which corresponds to a Hubble distance of 98.09 ± 6.90 Mpc. It was originally discovered on October 25, 1876, by the French astronomer, Édouard Stephan.
