= NGC 4441 =

Galaxy in the constellation Dorado

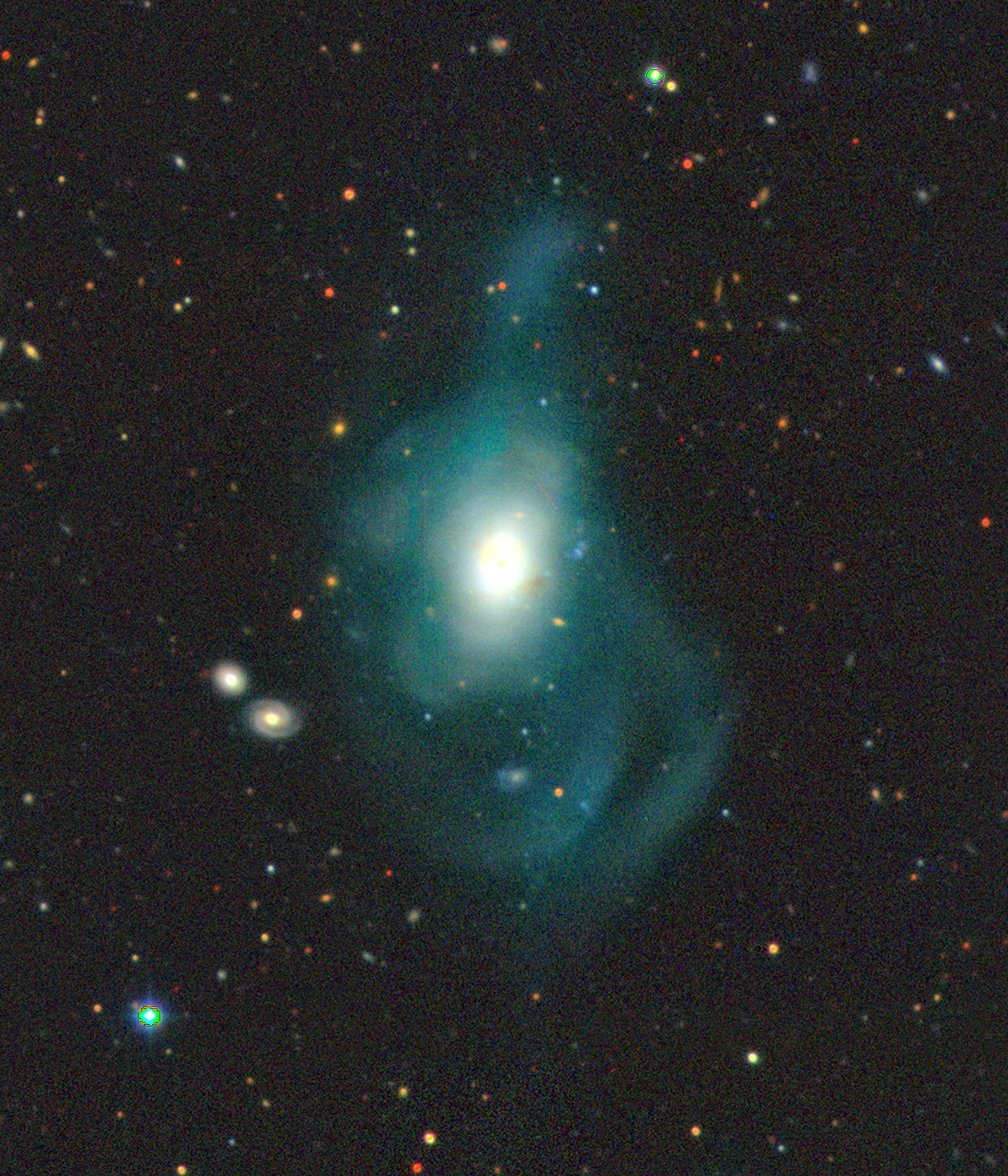
- NGC 4441 imaged by Legacy Surveys

Observation data (J2000 epoch)
- Constellation: Draco
- Right ascension: 12^{h} 27^{m} 20.3315^{s}
- Declination: +64° 48′ 06.253″
- Redshift: 0.009080±0.00000300
- Heliocentric radial velocity: 2,722±1 km/s
- Distance: 62.46 ± 0.49 Mly (19.150 ± 0.150 Mpc)
- Apparent magnitude (V): 13.5g

Characteristics
- Type: SAB0+ pec
- Size: ~81,800 ly (25.07 kpc) (estimated)
- Apparent size (V): 1.47′ × 0.93′

Other designations
- IRAS 12250+6504, 2MASS J12272032+6448064, UGC 7572, MCG +11-15-056, PGC 40836, CGCG 315-039

NGC 4441 is a peculiar lenticular galaxy in the constellation of Draco. Its velocity with respect to the cosmic microwave background is 2,830±8 km/s, which corresponds to a Hubble distance of 136.1 ± 9.5 Mly (41.74 ± 2.92 Mpc). However, two non-redshift measurements give a much closer mean distance of 62.46 ± 0.49 Mly (19.150 ± 0.150 Mpc). It was discovered by German-British astronomer William Herschel on 20 March 1790.

== NGC 4125 group ==
According to Abraham Mahtessian, NGC 4441 is part of the NGC 4125 group, which has at least 12 members. The other galaxies in this group are NGC 3796, NGC 3945, NGC 4036, NGC 4041, NGC 4081, NGC 4125, NGC 4205, NGC 4391, IC 758, UGC 7009, and UGC 7020A.

== Supernovae ==
Two supernovae have been observed in NGC 4441:

- SN 2019yvq (Type Ia, mag. 16.7) was discovered by Kōichi Itagaki on 28 December 2019. It was originally classified as a Type Ib/c, but later analysis concluded it to be a peculiar Type Ia, similar to SN 2002es. It was extremely bright in the ultraviolet but otherwise underluminous, and was relatively quickly declining in its brightness.
- SN 2025aecv (Type II, mag. 17.589) was discovered by ATLAS on 18 November 2025.

== See also ==
- List of NGC objects (4001–5000)
