= NGC 471 =

Galaxy in the constellation Pisces

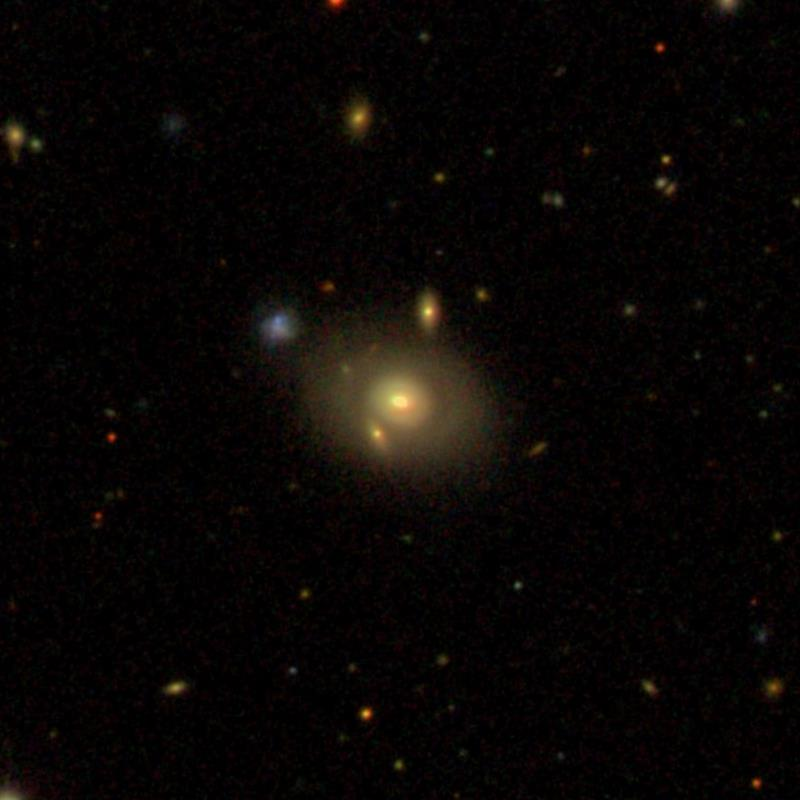
- SDSS image of NGC 471

Observation data (J2000 epoch)
- Constellation: Pisces
- Right ascension: 01^{h} 19^{m} 59.59494^{s}
- Declination: +14° 47′ 10.4016″
- Redshift: 0.013750
- Heliocentric radial velocity: 4094 ± 22 km/s
- Distance: 184.0 ± 13.0 Mly (56.40 ± 3.98 Mpc)
- Apparent magnitude (V): 13.32
- Apparent magnitude (B): 14.17

Characteristics
- Type: S0

Other designations
- UGC 861, MCG +02-04-024, PGC 4793

NGC 471 is a lenticular galaxy located about 168 million light-years away from Earth in the constellation Pisces. It was discovered by the German astronomer Albert Marth on November 3, 1864.

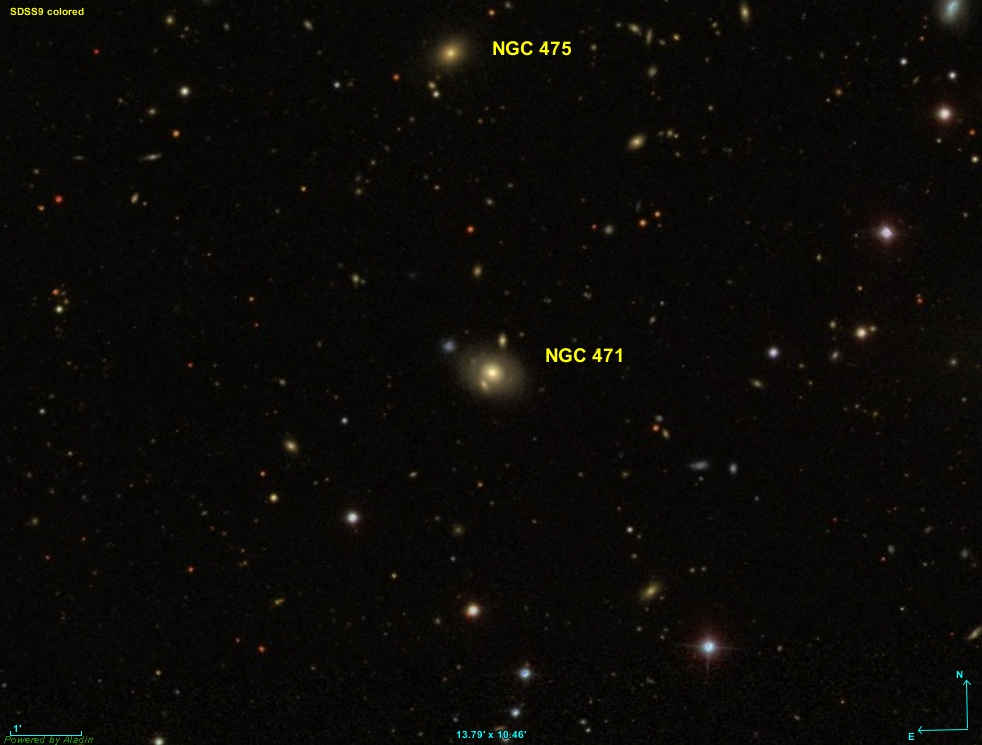
NGC 471 (SDSS)

== See also ==
- NGC 7007 – a barred lenticular galaxy
- NGC 7302 – a lenticular galaxy
- List of NGC objects (1–1000)
