= NGC 6993 =

Galaxy in the constellation Capricornus

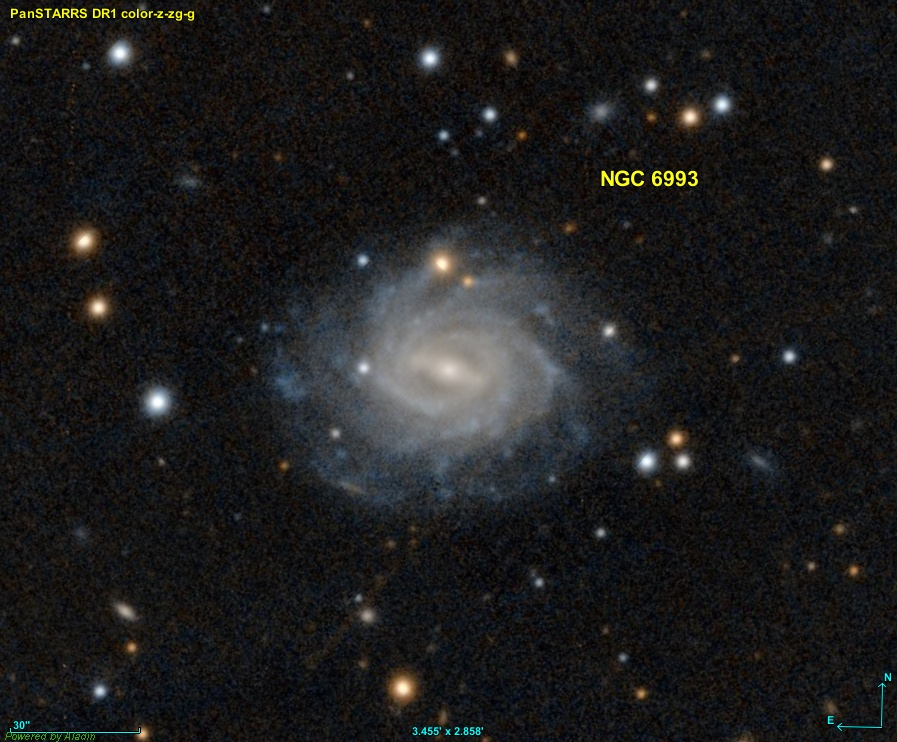
- NGC 6993 imaged by Pan-STARRS

Observation data (J2000 epoch)
- Constellation: Capricornus
- Right ascension: 20^{h} 53^{m} 54.0499^{s}
- Declination: −25° 28′ 20.920″
- Redshift: 0.020277±0.00000900
- Heliocentric radial velocity: 1,733±9 km/s
- Distance: 280.2 ± 19.6 Mly (85.91 ± 6.02 Mpc)
- Apparent magnitude (V): 14.5

Characteristics
- Type: SB(r)cd
- Size: ~204,500 ly (62.69 kpc) (estimated)
- Apparent size (V): 1.3′ × 1.1′

Other designations
- ESO 529- G 011, IRAS 20509-2539, 2MASX J20535406-2528210, MCG -04-49-007, PGC 65671

NGC 6993 is a large barred spiral galaxy in the constellation of Capricornus. Its velocity with respect to the cosmic microwave background is 5,824±18 km/s, which corresponds to a Hubble distance of 280.2 ± 19.6 Mly (85.91 ± 6.02 Mpc). It was discovered by American astronomer Francis Leavenworth on 8 July 1885.

NGC 6993 has a possible active galactic nucleus, i.e. it has a compact region at the center of a galaxy that emits a significant amount of energy across the electromagnetic spectrum, with characteristics indicating that this luminosity is not produced by the stars.

== Galaxy group ==
NGC 6993 is a member of a small group of three galaxies known as [CHM2007] LDC 1426. The other two galaxies are ESO 529-5 and ESO 529-10.

== Supernova ==
One Supernova has been observed in NGC 6993:

- SN 2020pvb (Type IIn, mag. 21.04) was discovered by Pan-STARRS on 18 July 2020. This supernova was initially detected during a pre-explosion outburst, with the actual supernova occurring several weeks later. Spectral signatures and a plateau-like light curve led scientists to classify SN 2020pvb as Type IIn-P, similar to SN 1994W, SN 2009kn, and SN 2011ht.

== Image gallery ==
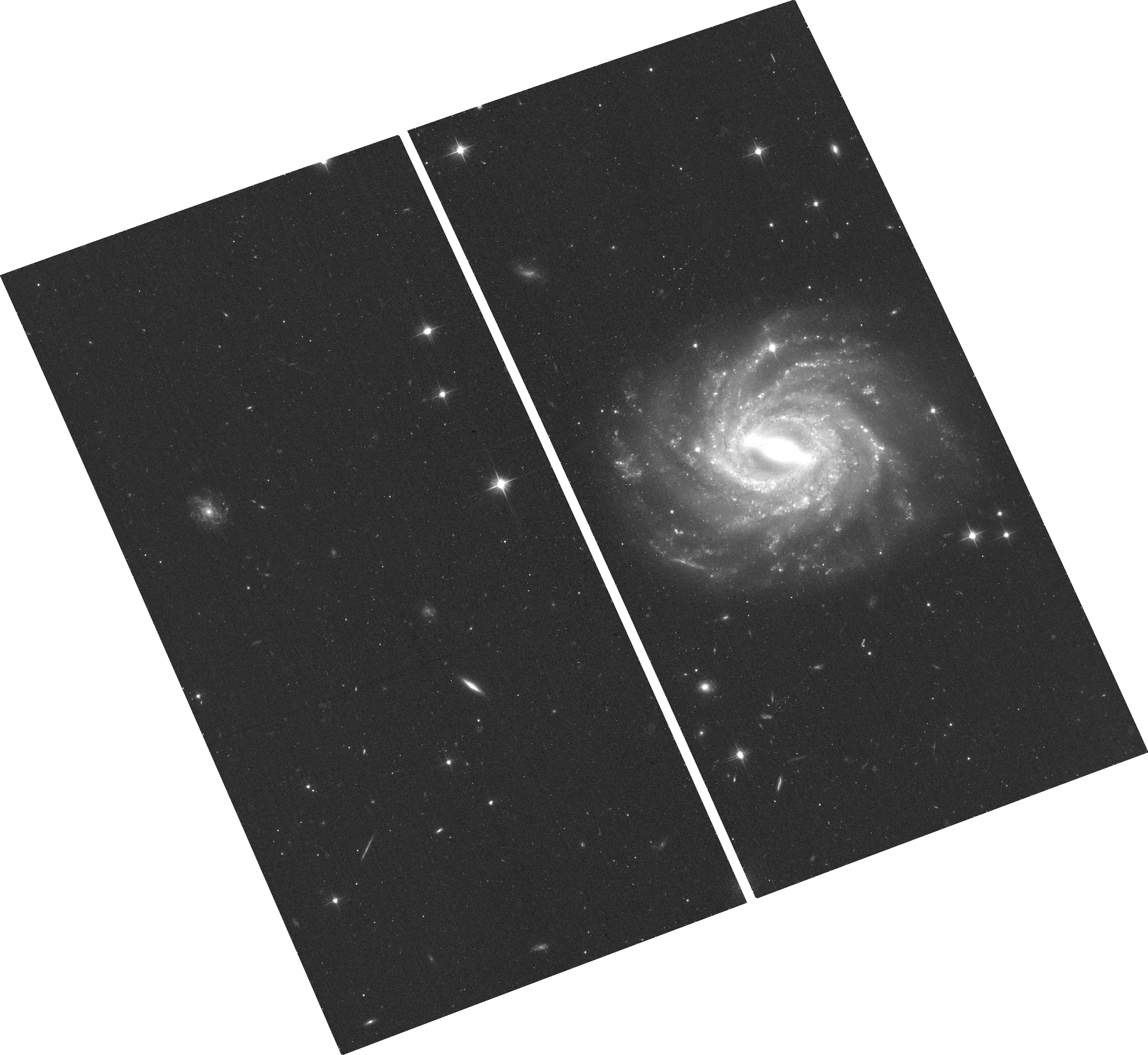
NGC 6993 imaged by the Hubble Space Telescope

== See also ==
- List of NGC objects (6001–7000)
