= NGC 475 =

Galaxy in the constellation Pisces

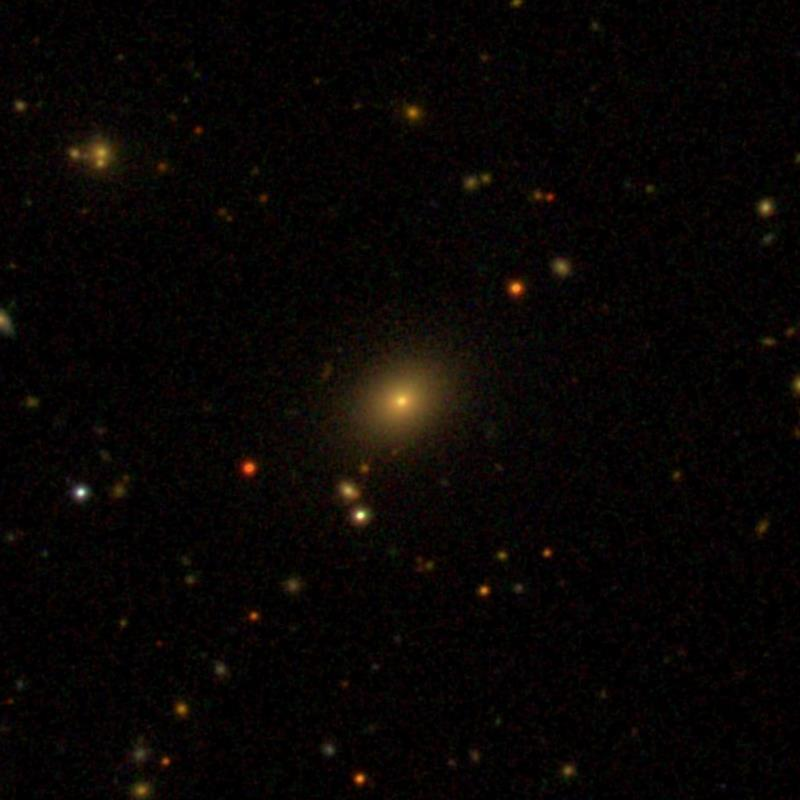
- SDSS view of NGC 475

Observation data (J2000 epoch)
- Constellation: Pisces
- Right ascension: 01^{h} 20^{m} 02.01^{s}
- Declination: +14° 51′ 39.8″
- Redshift: 0.05375 ± 0.00012
- Heliocentric radial velocity: 16113 ± 36 km/s
- Distance: 750 Mly
- Apparent magnitude (V): 15.0

Characteristics
- Type: E
- Apparent size (V): 0.8' x 0.5'

Other designations
- PGC 4796, IC 97, GC 5166, 2MASX J01200203+1451397, NPM1G +14.0045

NGC 475 is a lenticular galaxy in the constellation Pisces. It is located approximately 750 million light-years from Earth and has a diameter of roughly 125 thousand light-years. NGC 475 was discovered on November 3, 1864 by German astronomer Albert Marth.

== See also ==
- Lenticular galaxy
- NGC 7007
- List of NGC objects (1–1000)
