= NGC 7303 =

Barred spiral galaxy in the constellation Pegasus

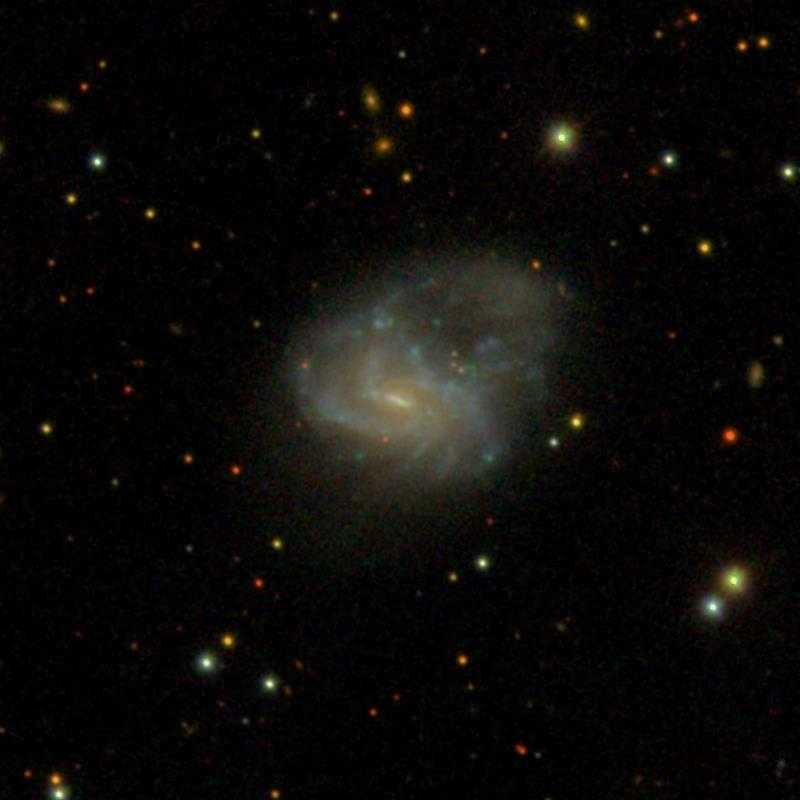
- SDSS image of NGC 7303

Observation data (J2000 epoch)
- Constellation: Pegasus
- Right ascension: 22^{h} 31^{m} 32^{s}
- Declination: +30° 57′ 24″
- Redshift: 0.0123
- Distance: 170 Mly
- Apparent magnitude (V): 12.8

Characteristics
- Type: Sbc
- Apparent size (V): 1.5' x 1.1'

Other designations
- CGCG 495-5, IRAS 22292+3042, KAZ 293, MCG 5-53-4, PGC 69061, UGC 12065

NGC 7303 is a barred spiral galaxy around 170 million light-years from Earth in the constellation Pegasus. NGC 7303 was discovered by astronomer John Herschel on September 15, 1828.

== See also ==
- NGC 4036
- NGC 1300
- List of NGC objects (7001–7840)
