= NGC 7069 =

Galaxy in the constellation Aquarius

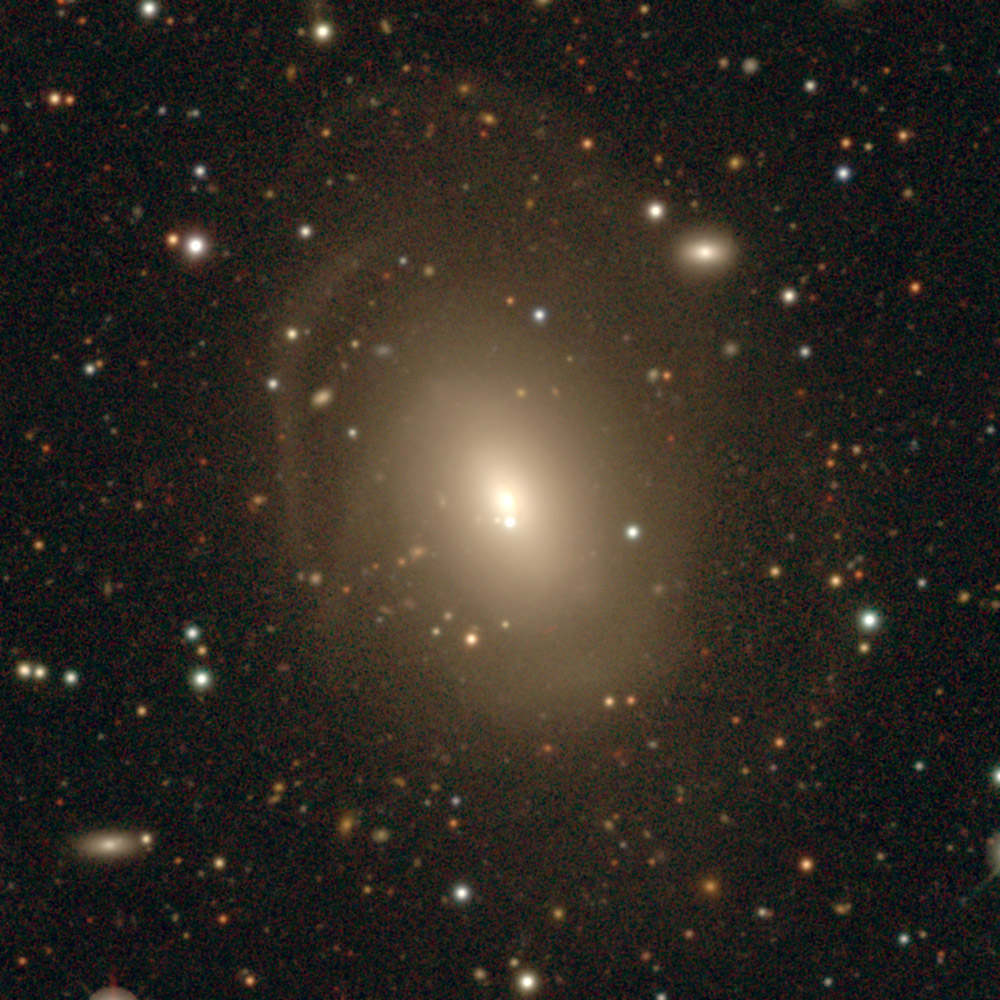
- legacy surveys image of NGC 7069

Observation data (J2000 epoch)
- Constellation: Aquarius
- Right ascension: 21^{h} 28^{m} 05.9^{s}
- Declination: −01° 38′ 49″
- Redshift: 0.030955
- Heliocentric radial velocity: 9,280 km/s
- Distance: 122 Mpc (398 Mly)
- Apparent magnitude (V): 14.36

Characteristics
- Type: SAB0^{−}(s), LINER
- Size: ~108,600 ly (33.30 kpc)(estimated)
- Apparent size (V): 1.3 x 0.9

Other designations
- CGCG 375-40, MCG 0-54-19, PGC 66807, UGC 11747

NGC 7069 is a lenticular galaxy located about 400 million light-years away in the constellation of Aquarius. NGC 7069 is also classified as a LINER galaxy. NGC 7069 was discovered by astronomer Albert Marth on October 12, 1863.

== See also ==
- NGC 7033
