= NGC 7033 =

Galaxy in the constellation Pegasus

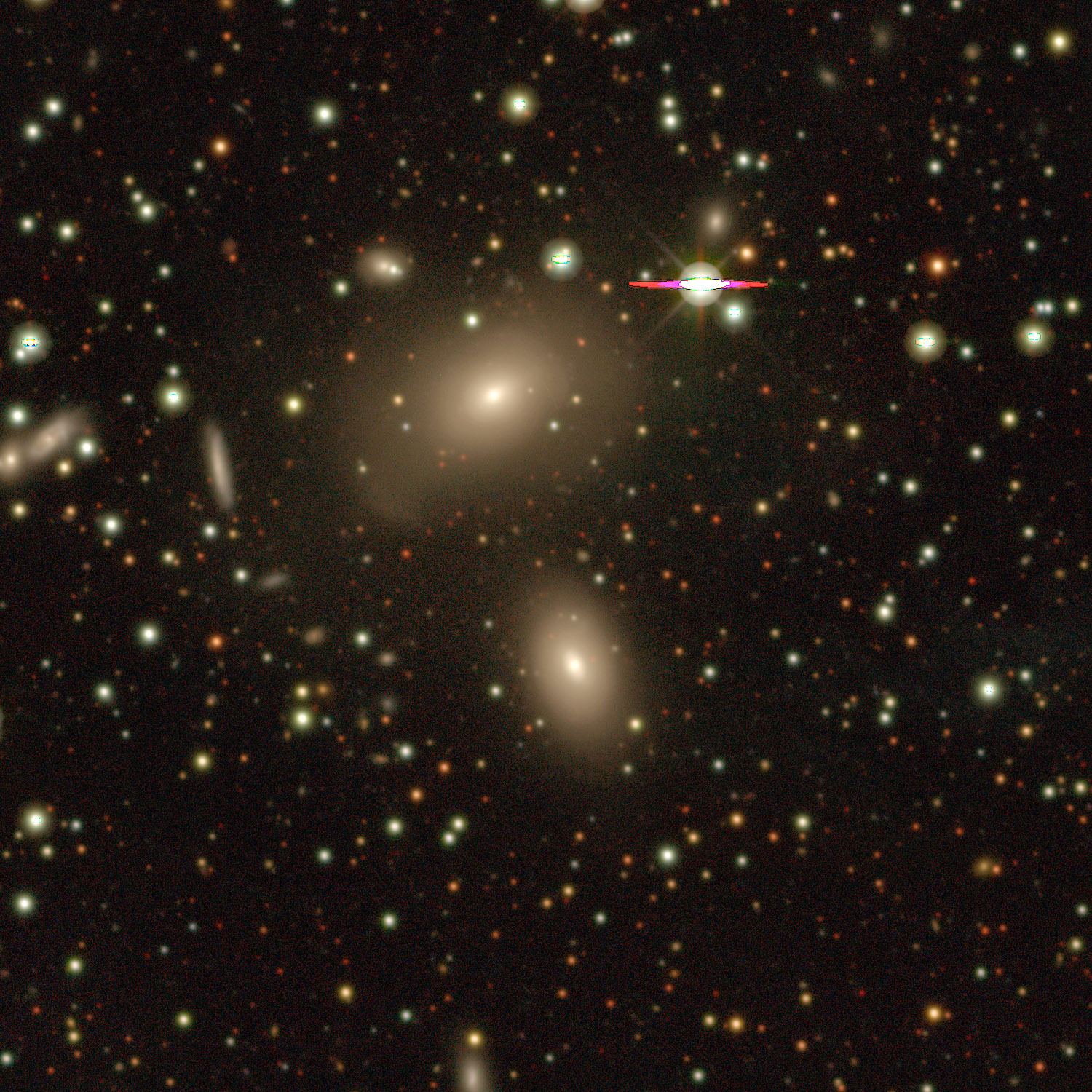
- legacy surveys image of NGC 7033 (bottom) and NGC 7034 (top).

Observation data (J2000 epoch)
- Constellation: Pegasus
- Right ascension: 21^{h} 09^{m} 36.2^{s}
- Declination: 15° 07′ 30″
- Redshift: 0.030374
- Heliocentric radial velocity: 9,106 km/s
- Distance: 391.4 Mly
- Apparent magnitude (V): 15.10

Characteristics
- Type: S0/a
- Apparent size (V): 0.7 x 0.4

Other designations
- CGCG 426-6, KCPG 554A, MCG 2-54-2, NPM1G +14.0507, PGC 66228

NGC 7033 is a lenticular galaxy located about 390 million light-years away in the constellation of Pegasus. It is part of a pair of galaxies that contains the nearby galaxy NGC 7034. NGC 7033 was discovered by astronomer Albert Marth on September 17, 1863.

== Supernova ==
One supernova has been observed in NGC 7033. SN 2016cyt (Type Ia, mag. 17.9) was discovered by POSS on July 2, 2016.

== See also ==
- NGC 7007 – an unrelated barred lenticular galaxy
- NGC 7302 – an unrelated lenticular galaxy
- List of NGC objects (7001–7840)
