= NGC 466 =

Lenticular galaxy in the constellation Tucana

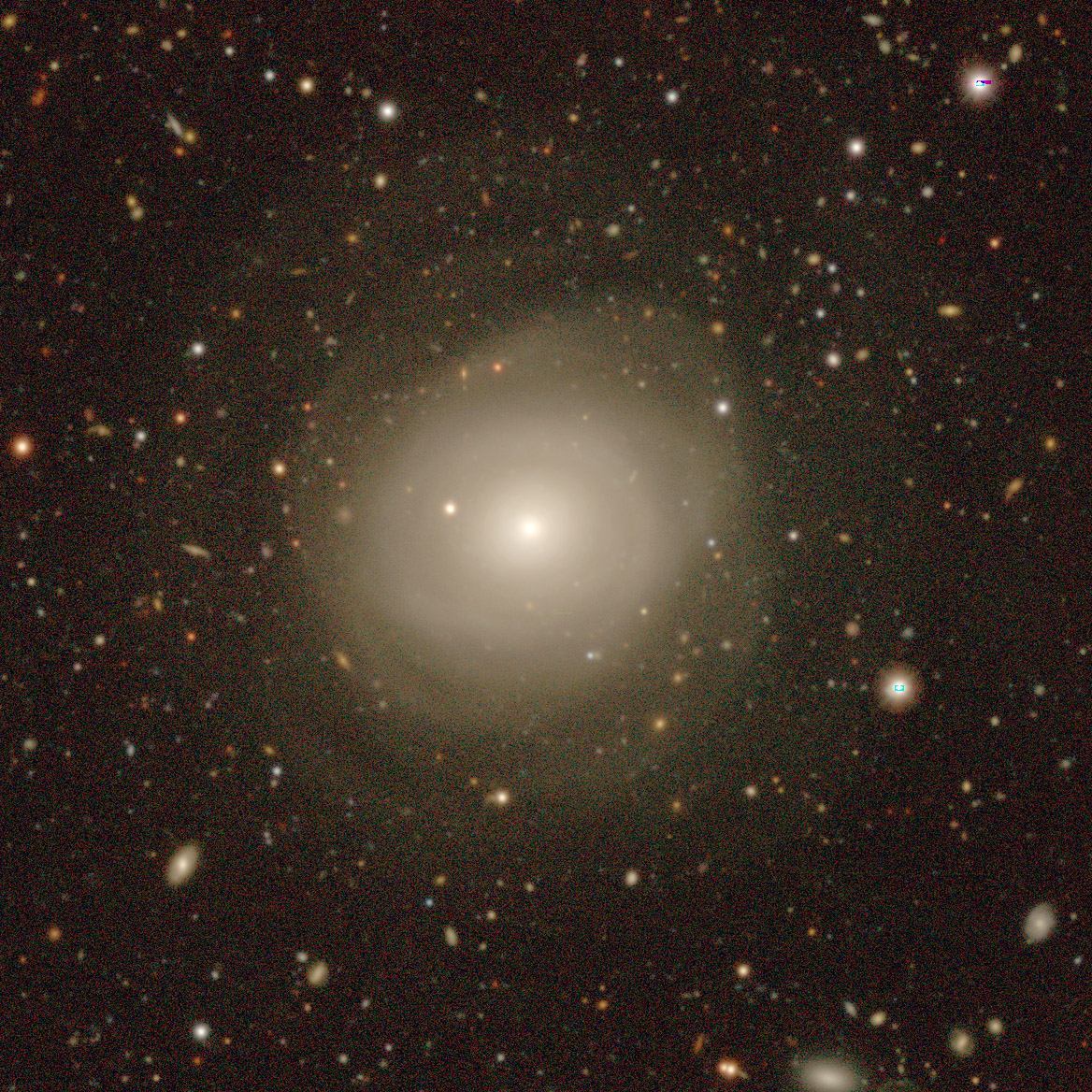
- Legacy Survey DR 10 image of NGC 466

Observation data (J2000 epoch)
- Constellation: Tucana
- Right ascension: 01^{h} 17^{m} 13.2385^{s}.
- Declination: −58° 54′ 35.746″
- Redshift: 0.017552±0.000087
- Heliocentric radial velocity: 5,262±26 km/s
- Distance: 247.2 ± 17.4 Mly (75.78 ± 5.33 Mpc)
- Group or cluster: NGC 434 Group (LGG 19)
- Apparent magnitude (V): 13.56

Characteristics
- Type: SA0^+(rs)
- Apparent size (V): 1.8′ × 1.5′

Other designations
- ESO 113- G 034, AM 0115-591, PGC 4632

NGC 466 is a lenticular galaxy located about 247 million light-years away from Earth in the constellation Tucana. NGC 466 was discovered by astronomer John Herschel on October 3, 1836.

== NGC 434 group ==
NGC 466 is a member of the NGC 434 galaxy group (also known as LGG 19). This group includes at least 10 galaxies, including NGC 434, NGC 434A, NGC 440, NGC 484, IC 1649, and four from the ESO catalogue.

== Supernova ==
One supernova has been observed in NGC 466: SN 2025rib (Type Ia-91bg-like, mag. 18.186) was discovered by ATLAS on 16 July 2025.

== See also ==
- NGC 7302
- List of NGC objects (1–1000)
