= NGC 476 =

Galaxy in the constellation Pisces

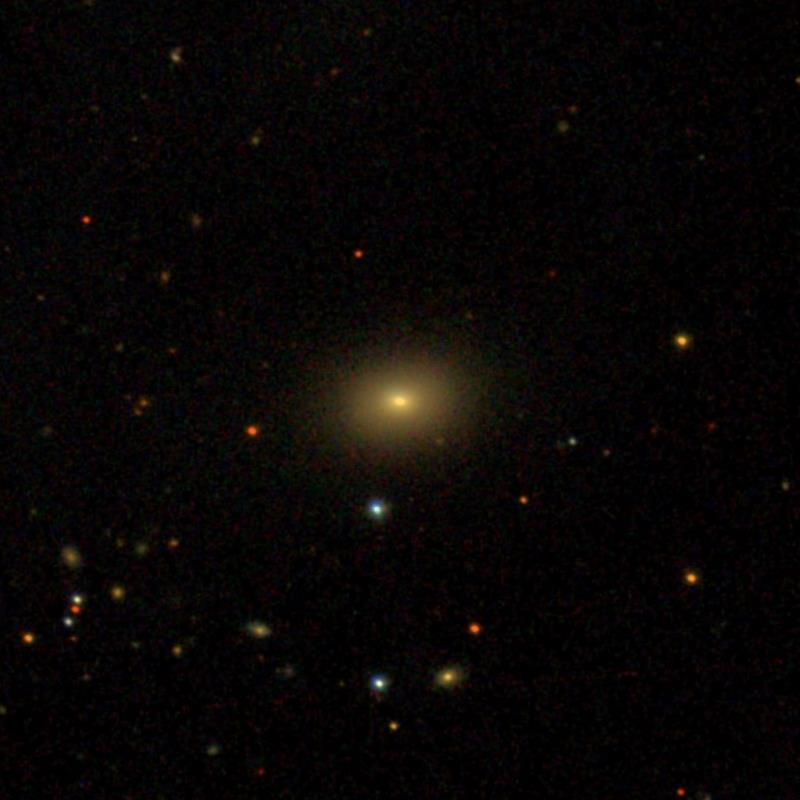
- SDSS view of NGC 476

Observation data (J2000 epoch)
- Constellation: Pisces
- Right ascension: 01^{h} 20^{m} 19.93^{s}
- Declination: +16° 01′ 12.7″
- Redshift: 0,0214 ± 0,0004
- Heliocentric radial velocity: 6337 ± 126 km/s
- Distance: 261 Mly
- Apparent magnitude (V): 14.4

Characteristics
- Type: S0
- Apparent size (V): 0.6' x 0.4'

Other designations
- PGC 4814, GC 5167, MCG +03-04-023 2MASX J01201992+1601126, NPM1G +15.0050

NGC 476 is a lenticular galaxy in the constellation Pisces. It is located approximately 261 million light-years from Earth and was discovered on November 3, 1864 by German astronomer Albert Marth.

== See also ==
- Lenticular galaxy
- NGC 7007
- List of NGC objects (1–1000)
