= NGC 3945 =

Galaxy in the constellation Ursa Major

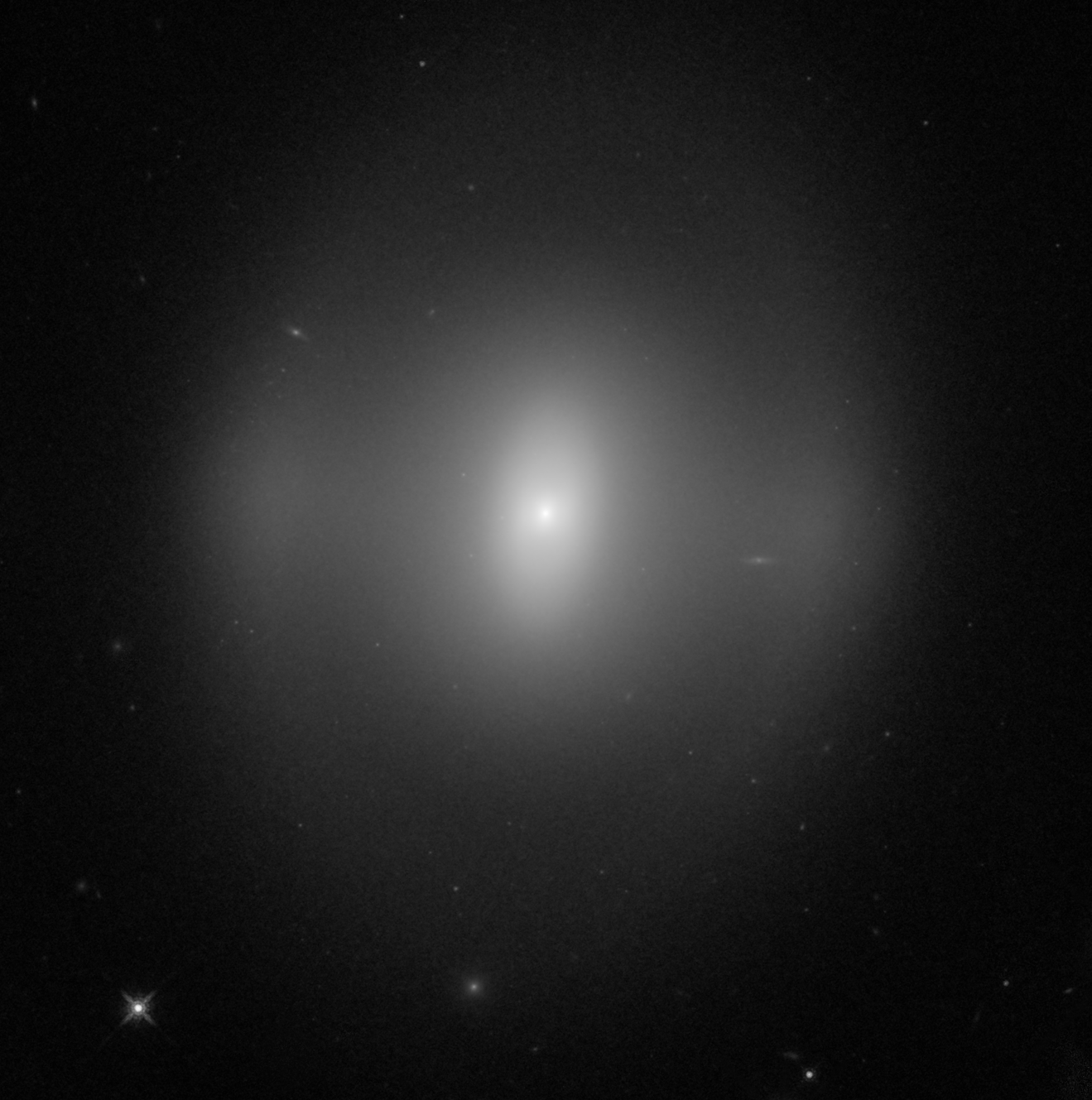
- NGC 3945 imaged by the Hubble Space Telescope

Observation data (J2000 epoch)
- Constellation: Ursa Major
- Right ascension: 11^{h} 53^{m} 13.726^{s}
- Declination: +60° 40′ 32.02″
- Redshift: 0.004153
- Heliocentric radial velocity: 1,242±22 km/s
- Distance: 63 Mly (19.4 Mpc)
- Group or cluster: NGC 4036 Group (LGG 266)
- Apparent magnitude (V): 10.75
- Apparent magnitude (B): 11.70

Characteristics
- Type: (R)SB(rs)0^{+}
- Size: ~128,800 ly (39.48 kpc) (estimated)
- Apparent size (V): 5.2′ × 3.5′

Other designations
- IRAS 11506+6056, UGC 6860, MCG +10-17-096, PGC 37258, CGCG 292-042

NGC 3945 is a barred lenticular galaxy in the constellation Ursa Major. It was discovered by German-British astronomer William Herschel on March 19, 1790.

NGC 3945 has a complex structure, with two concentric bars and a pseudobulge. Unlike classical bulges which are like miniature elliptical galaxies, pseudobulges have features similar to disk galaxies, including a flattened structure and significant rotation. It is classified as a LINER galaxy. The formation history of NGC 3945 is likely quite complex, with the pseudo-bulge being formed gradually from disk material, while bulges (spheroidal components) would have formed from violent merger events.

Unlike galaxies with similar velocity dispersions and luminosities, the central black hole of NGC 3945 has an unusually low mass, estimated to be around 9×10^{6} M_{☉}. However, it is also possible that NGC 3945 has no central black hole at all.

== NGC 4036 Group ==
NGC 3945 is a part of the 13 member NGC 4036 galaxy group (also known as LGG 266), which includes NGC 4036, NGC 4041, IC 758, UGC 7009, UGC 7019, PGC 37567, PGC 38027, PGC 2608163, PGC 4001456, PGC 4001735, PGC 4011191, and PGC 4074702.

The NGC 4036 Group is part of the Ursa Major Cloud, which is part of the Virgo Supercluster.

== See also ==
- List of NGC objects (3001–4000)
