= NGC 7070 =

Spiral galaxy in the constellation of Grus

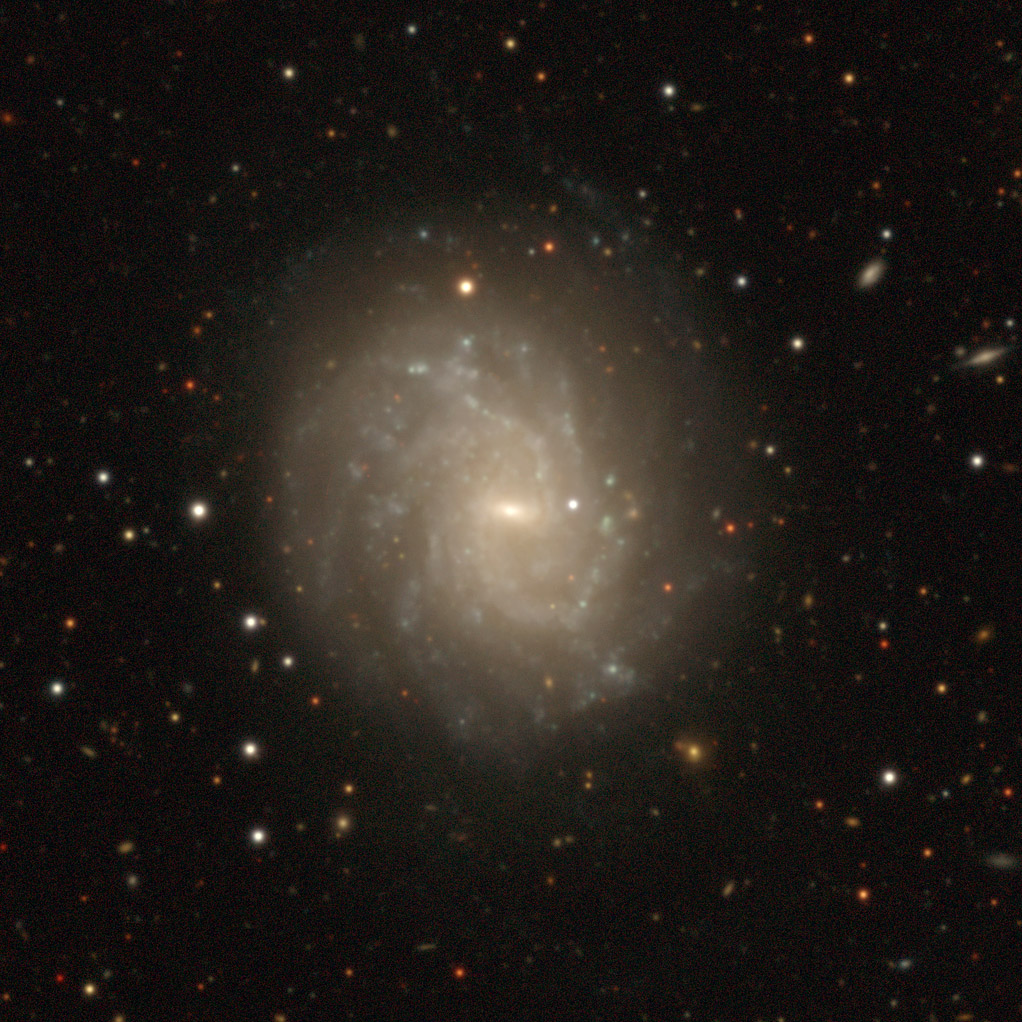
- NGC 7070 with legacy surveys

Observation data (J2000 epoch)
- Constellation: Grus
- Right ascension: 21^{h} 30^{m} 25.3^{s}
- Declination: −43° 05′ 14″
- Redshift: 0.007925
- Heliocentric radial velocity: 2,376 km/s
- Distance: 29.6 Mpc (97 Mly) (estimated)
- Apparent magnitude (V): 12.80

Characteristics
- Type: SA(s)cd
- Apparent size (V): 2.3 x 1.8

Other designations
- ESO 287-28, AM 2127-431, IRAS 21272-4318, MCG -7-44-16, PGC 66869

NGC 7070 is a spiral galaxy located about 100 million light-years away in the constellation of Grus. It has a close companion galaxy called NGC 7070A. NGC 7070 was discovered by astronomer John Herschel on September 5, 1834.

NGC 7070 is a member of a group of galaxies known as the NGC 7079 Group.

== See also ==
- NGC 7083
