= NGC 3073 =

Galaxy in the constellation Ursa Major

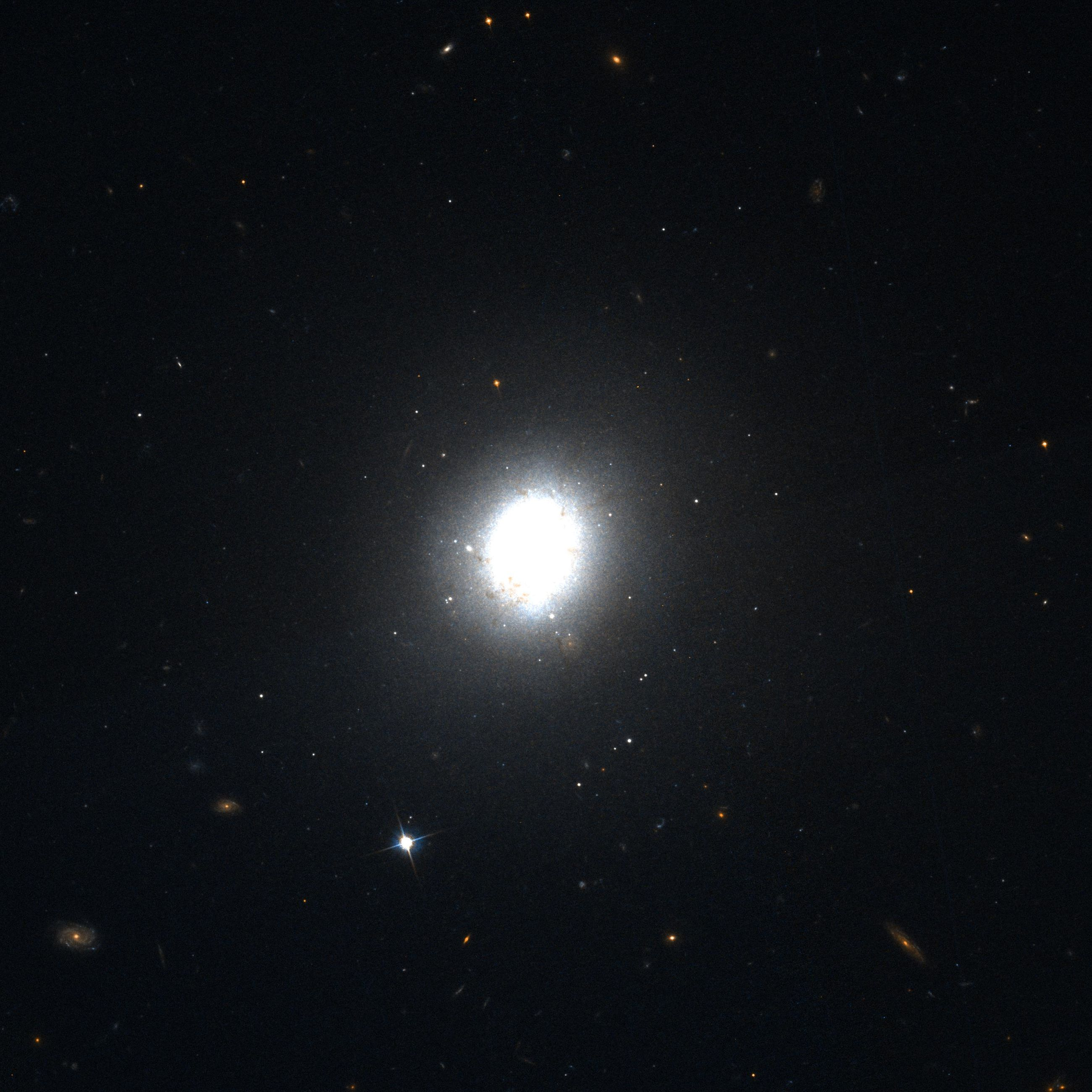
- NGC 3073 imaged by the Hubble Space Telescope

Observation data (J2000 epoch)
- Constellation: Ursa Major
- Right ascension: 10^{h} 00^{m} 52.042^{s}
- Declination: +55° 37′ 08.17″
- Redshift: 0.003933
- Heliocentric radial velocity: 1177 km/s
- Distance: 65 Mly (20 Mpc)
- Group or cluster: NGC 3079 Group
- Apparent magnitude (V): 13.40
- Apparent magnitude (B): 14.07

Characteristics
- Type: SAB0^{−}
- Size: ~40,300 ly (12.36 kpc) (estimated)
- Apparent size (V): 1.2′ × 1.1′

Other designations
- HOLM 156B, UGC 5374, MCG +09-17-007, Mrk 131, PGC 28974, CGCG 265-054

NGC 3073 is a dwarf lenticular galaxy in the constellation Ursa Major. It is at a distance of about 65 million light-years (20 megaparsecs) from Earth. NGC 3073 was discovered by German-British astronomer William Herschel on 1 April 1790.

NGC 3073 belongs to the NGC 3079 Group (also known as LGG 188), which contains six galaxies. The other galaxies in the group are NGC 3079, UGC 5421, UGC 5479, UGC 5459, and UGC 5460. The galaxies NGC 3073 and NGC 3079 are also listed together as Holm 156 in Erik Holmberg's A Study of Double and Multiple Galaxies Together with Inquiries into some General Metagalactic Problems, published in 1937.

== Gallery ==
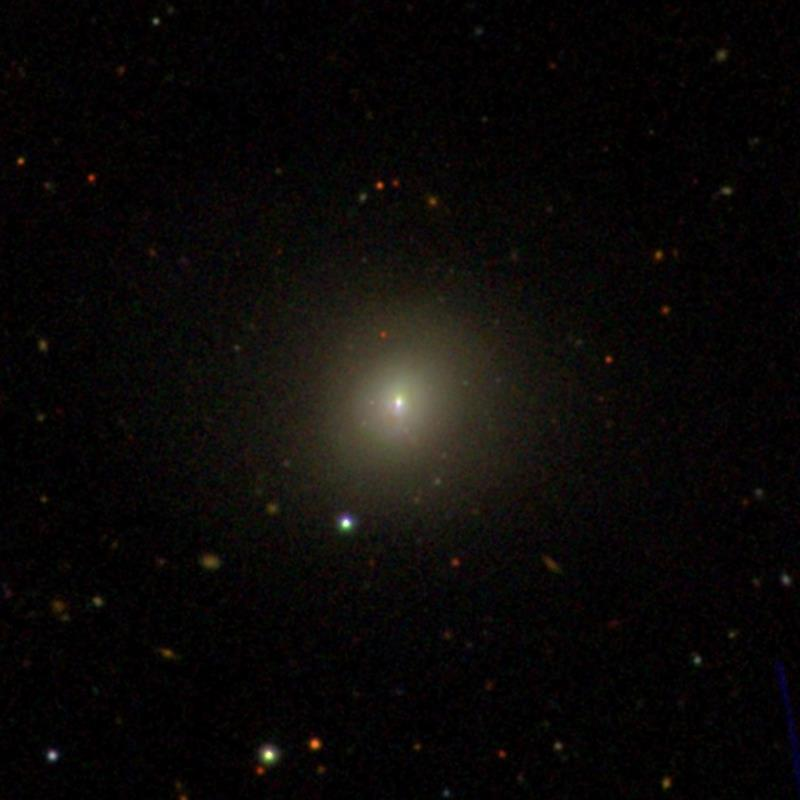
NGC 3073 imaged by SDSS

== See also ==
- List of NGC objects (3001–4000)
