= NGC 3079 =

Galaxy in the constellation Ursa Major

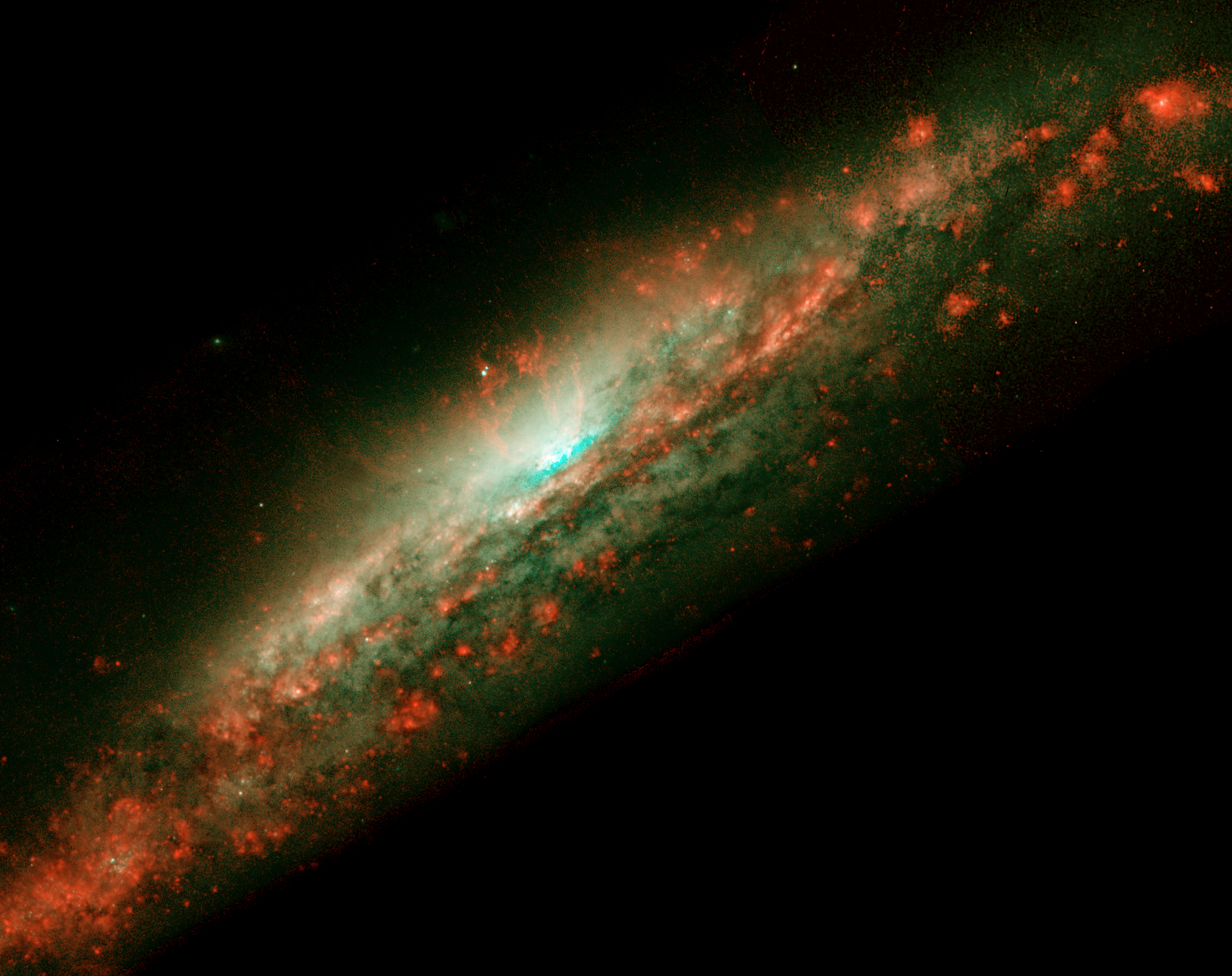
- NGC 3079 imaged by the Hubble Space Telescope

Observation data (J2000 epoch)
- Constellation: Ursa Major
- Right ascension: 10^{h} 01^{m} 57.9268^{s}
- Declination: +55° 40′ 46.926″
- Redshift: 1116±1 km/s
- Distance: 50 Mly (15 Mpc)
- Group or cluster: NGC 3079 Group (LGG 188)
- Apparent magnitude (V): 10.8

Characteristics
- Type: SB(s)c
- Size: ~135,600 ly (41.58 kpc) (estimated)
- Apparent size (V): 8.1′ × 1.3′

Other designations
- HOLM 156A, IRAS 09585+5555, UGC 5387, PGC 29050, CGCG 266-008

NGC 3079, also known as the Phantom Frisbee Galaxy, is a barred spiral galaxy about 50 million light-years away, and located in the constellation Ursa Major. The galaxy was discovered by German-British astronomer William Herschel on 1 April 1790.

The SIMBAD database lists NGC 3079 as a Seyfert II Galaxy, i.e. it has a quasar-like nucleus with very high surface brightnesses whose spectra reveal strong, high-ionisation emission lines, but unlike quasars, the host galaxy is clearly detectable.

== Center Bubble ==
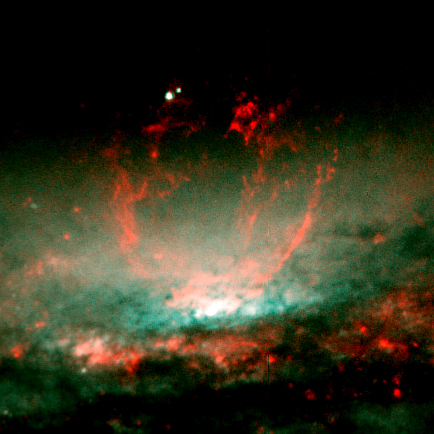
This visible light Hubble Space Telescope image shows the lumpy bubble of hot gas located at the center of the galaxy's disk.

A prominent feature of this galaxy is the "bubble" forming in the very center (see image to left). The supermassive black hole at the core has a mass of 2.4+2.4
−1.2×10^{6} M_{☉}.

The bubble forming in the center of NGC 3079 is believed to be about 3000 light-years wide and to rise more than 3500 light-years above the disc of the galaxy. It is speculated that the bubble is being formed by particles streaming at high speeds, which were in turn caused by a large burst of star formation. This current bubble is thought to have been created about one million years ago, and computer modeling suggests that there is an ongoing cycle of forming bubbles, with a new bubble forming approximately every 10 million years.

== NGC 3079 Group ==
NGC 3079 is the namesake of the NGC 3079 Group (also known as LGG 188), which contains six galaxies. The other galaxies in the group are NGC 3073, UGC 5421, UGC 5479, UGC 5459, and UGC 5460. The galaxies NGC 3073 and NGC 3079 are also listed together as Holm 156 in Erik Holmberg's A Study of Double and Multiple Galaxies Together with Inquiries into some General Metagalactic Problems, published in 1937.

== Supernovae ==
Two supernovae have been observed in NGC 3079:

- SN 2001ci (Type Ic, mag. 18.3) was discovered by LOTOSS (Lick Observatory and Tenagra Observatory Supernova Searches) on 17 April 2001.
- SN 2013ee (Type II, mag. 15.5) was discovered by Giancarlo Cortini on 13 July 2013.

== Image gallery ==
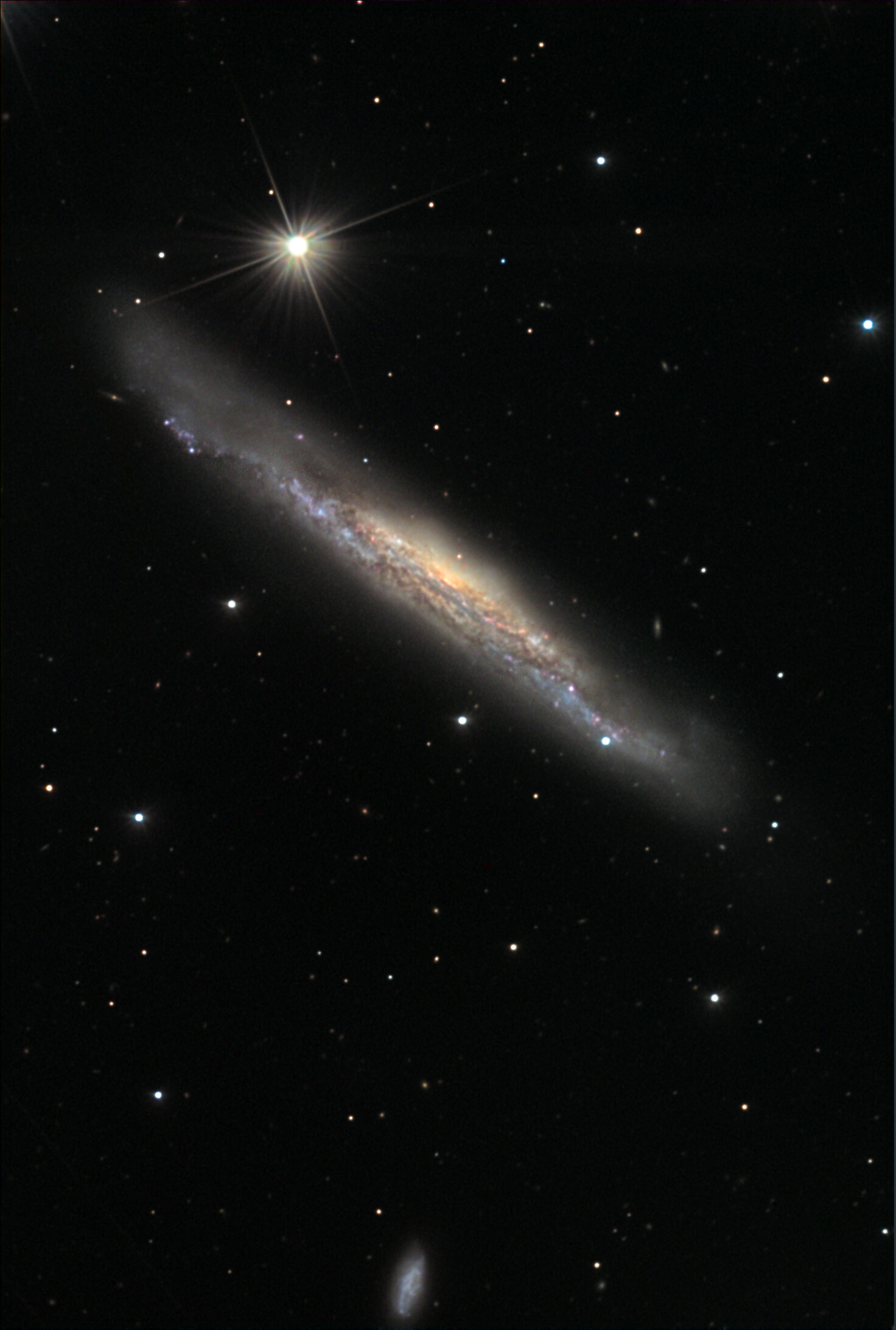
NGC 3079 imaged by Kitt Peak National Observatory, 13 March 2014

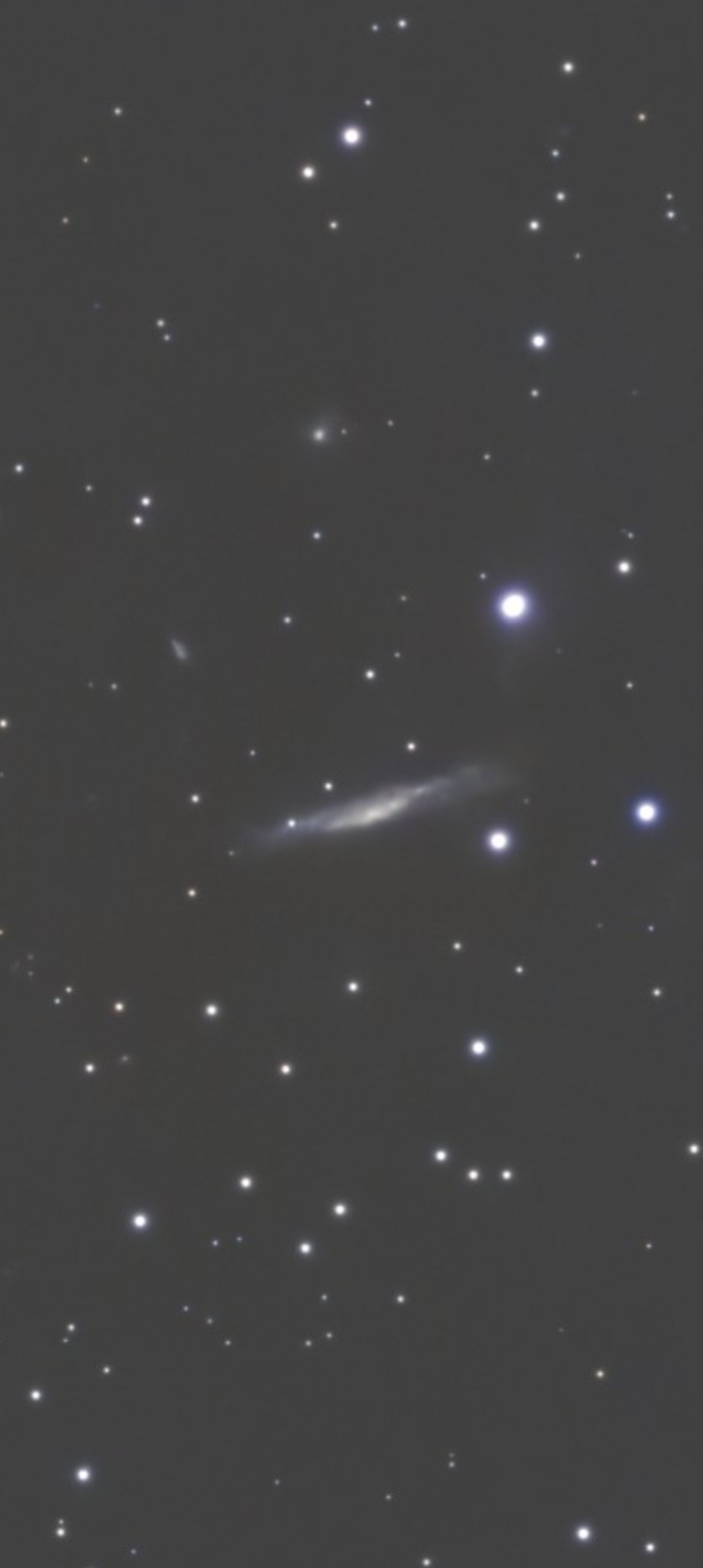
NGC 3079 Captured by Dwarf3 Smart Telescope

== See also ==
- Sombrero Galaxy
- List of NGC objects (3001–4000)
