= UGC 5460 =

Galaxy in the constellation Ursa Major

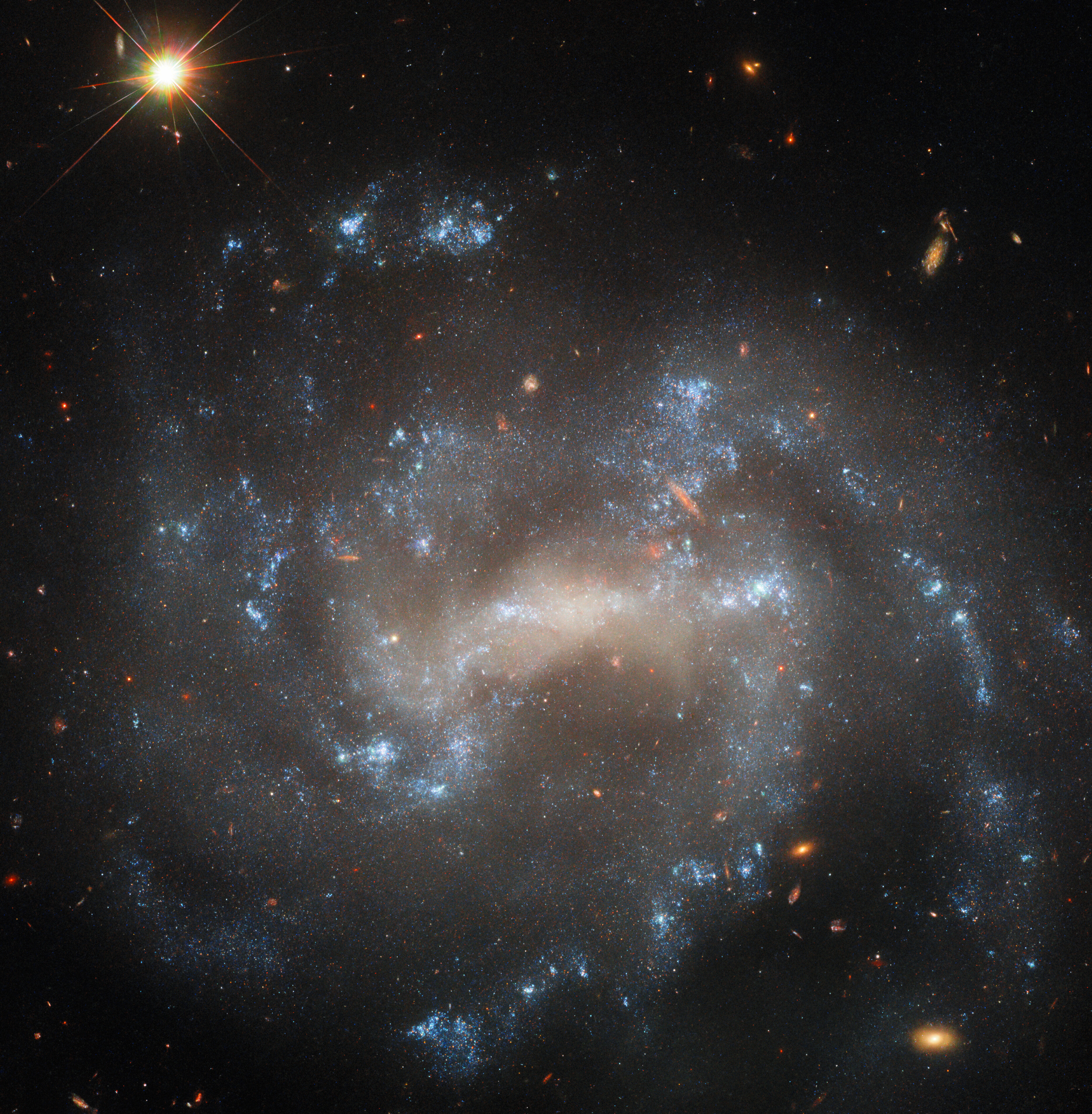
- UGC 5460 imaged by the Hubble Space Telescope

Observation data (J2000 epoch)
- Constellation: Ursa Major
- Right ascension: 10^{h} 08^{m} 09.1731^{s}
- Declination: +51° 50′ 41.583″
- Redshift: 0.003646
- Heliocentric radial velocity: 1,093±5 km/s
- Distance: 61.4 ± 4.4 Mly (18.82 ± 1.34 Mpc)
- Group or cluster: NGC 3079 Group (LGG 188)
- Apparent magnitude (V): 13.9

Characteristics
- Type: SB(rs)d
- Size: ~43,900 ly (13.46 kpc) (estimated)

Other designations
- IRAS F10048+5205, MCG +09-17-028, PGC 29469, CGCG 266-025

UGC 5460 is a barred spiral galaxy in the constellation of Ursa Major. Its velocity with respect to the cosmic microwave background for is 1,276±14 km/s, which corresponds to a Hubble distance of 61.4 ± 4.4 Mly (18.82 ± 1.34 Mpc). In addition, two non redshift measurements give a distance of 58.1 ± 6.8 Mly (17.8 ± 2.1 Mpc). The first known reference to this galaxy comes from Part 1 of the Morphological Catalogue of Galaxies, where it is listed as MCG +09-17-028.

The SIMBAD database lists UGC 5460 as an active galaxy nucleus candidate, i.e. it has a compact region at the center that emits a significant amount of energy across the electromagnetic spectrum, with characteristics indicating that this luminosity is not produced by the stars.

== NGC 3079 Group ==
UGC 5460 is a member of the NGC 3079 Group (also known as LGG 188), which contains six galaxies. The other five galaxies in the group are: NGC 3073, NGC 3079, UGC 5421, UGC 5459, and UGC 5479.

== Supernovae ==
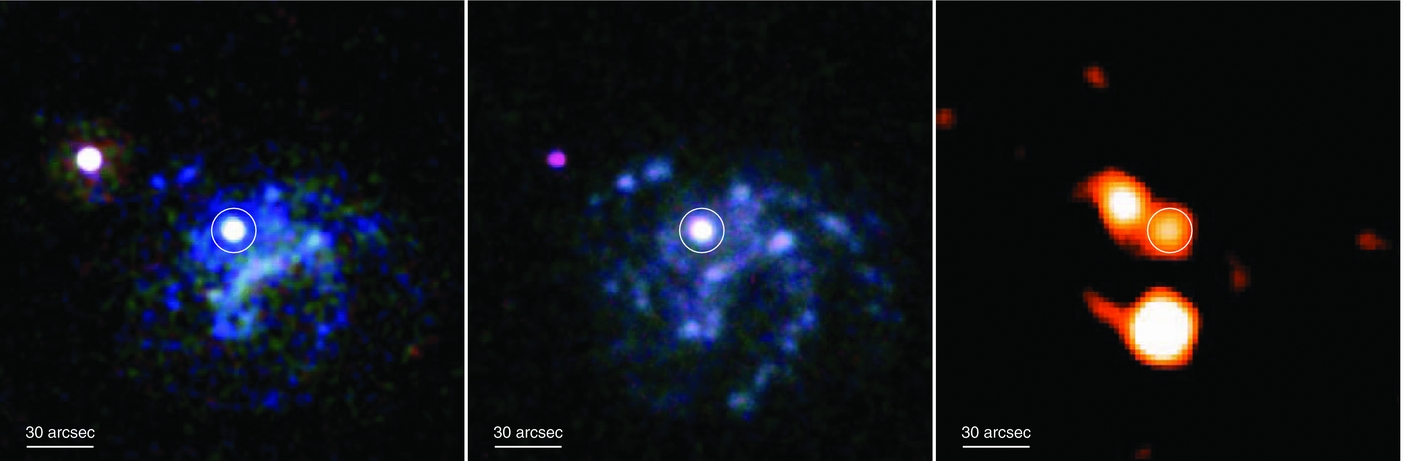
Swift UVOT optical (left), UVOT UV (middle), and XRT X-ray (right) images of SN 2011ht and its host galaxy UGC 5460.

Two supernovae have been observed in UGC 5460:

- SN 2011ht (Type IIn, mag. 17) was discovered by Tom Boles on 29 September 2011. This supernova was initially suspected of being a luminous blue variable. Later analysis suggested that it belongs to an unusual group of SNe IIn, including SN 1994W and SN 2009kn, and perhaps SN 2005cl, that warrants a new designation of Type IIn-P.
- SN 2015as (Type IIb, mag. 16) was discovered by Ken'ichi Nishimura on 15 November 2015. Although initially classified as Type II, later analysis concluded it to be Type IIb.
