= NGC 7034 =

Galaxy in the constellation Pegasus

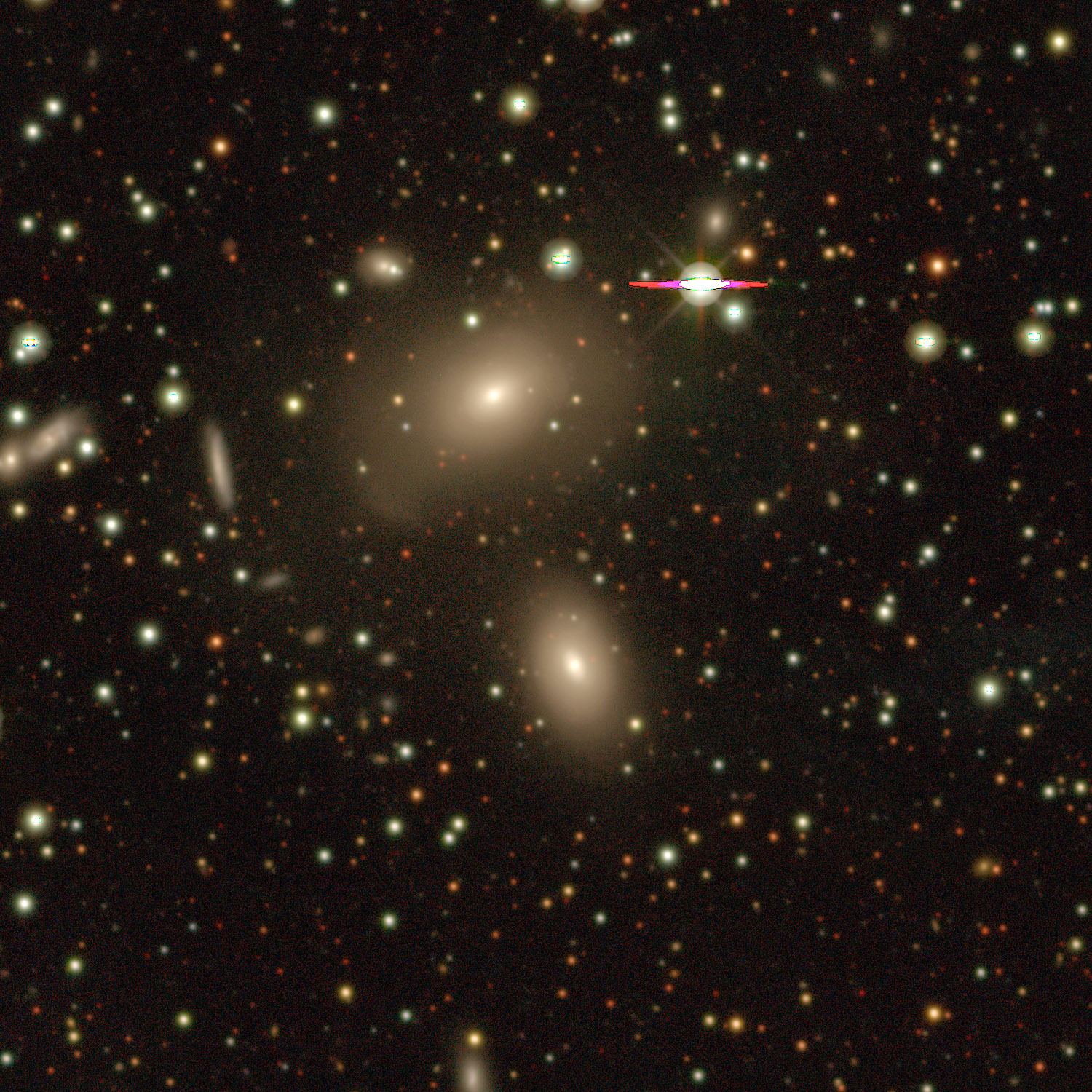
- legacy surveys image of NGC 7034 (top) and NGC 7033 (bottom).

Observation data (J2000 epoch)
- Constellation: Pegasus
- Right ascension: 21^{h} 09^{m} 38.2^{s}
- Declination: 15° 09′ 02″
- Redshift: 0.029734 ± 0.000100
- Heliocentric radial velocity: 8914 ± 30 km/s
- Galactocentric velocity: 9109 ± 31 km/s
- Distance: 117.8 ± 8.3 Mpc (384 ± 27 Mly) h^{−1}_{0.73}
- Apparent magnitude (V): 14.81

Characteristics
- Type: E3
- Apparent size (V): 1.0' × 0.7'

Other designations
- CGCG 426-7, KCPG 554B, MCG 2-54-3, NPM1G +14.0508, PGC 66227, UGC 11687

NGC 7034 is an elliptical galaxy located about 380 million light-years away in the constellation of Pegasus. It is part of a pair of galaxies that contains the nearby galaxy NGC 7033. NGC 7034 was discovered by astronomer Albert Marth on September 17, 1863.

== See also ==
- NGC 4486 (M87) – an unrelated super elliptical galaxy
- List of NGC objects (7001–7840)
