= NGC 434 =

Galaxy in the constellation Tucana

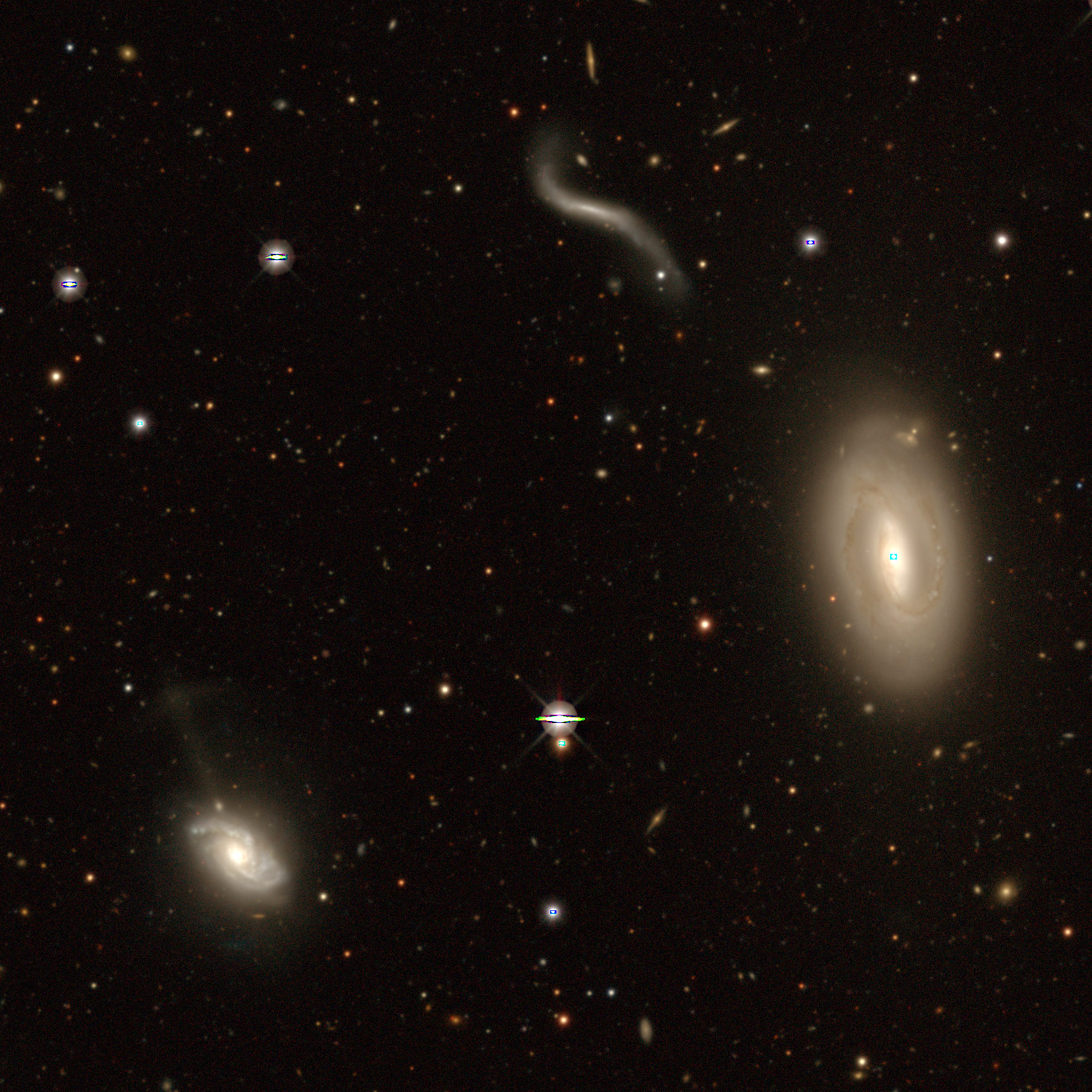
- NGC 434 (right side, lower galaxy) and NGC 434A (right side, upper galaxy) as seen by legacy surveys. At the lower left side is NGC 440.

Observation data (J2000 epoch)
- Constellation: Tucana
- Right ascension: 01^{h} 12^{m} 14.1^{s}
- Declination: −58° 14′ 53″
- Redshift: 0.016425
- Heliocentric radial velocity: 4,924 km/s
- Apparent magnitude (V): 12.79
- Absolute magnitude (V): -22.58

Characteristics
- Type: SAB(s)ab
- Apparent size (V): 2.1' × 1.2'

Other designations
- ESO 113- G 023, 2MASX J01121411-5814525, ESO-LV 1130230, PGC 4325.

NGC 434 is an intermediate spiral galaxy of type SAB(s)ab located in the constellation Tucana. It was discovered on October 28, 1834 by John Herschel. It was described by Dreyer as "bright, small, round, pretty suddenly bright middle."

NGC 434 is part of a galaxy group known as NGC 434 Group or LGG 19. It has at least 10 members, which are NGC 434, NGC 440, NGC 466, NGC 484, NGC 434A, IC 1649, ESO 113-27, ESO 151-27, ESO 114-1 and ESO 113-35.

== Gallery ==
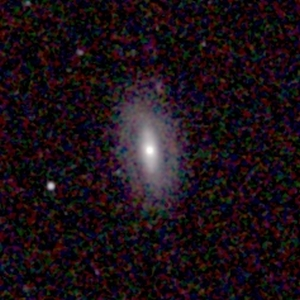
2MASS image of NGC 434

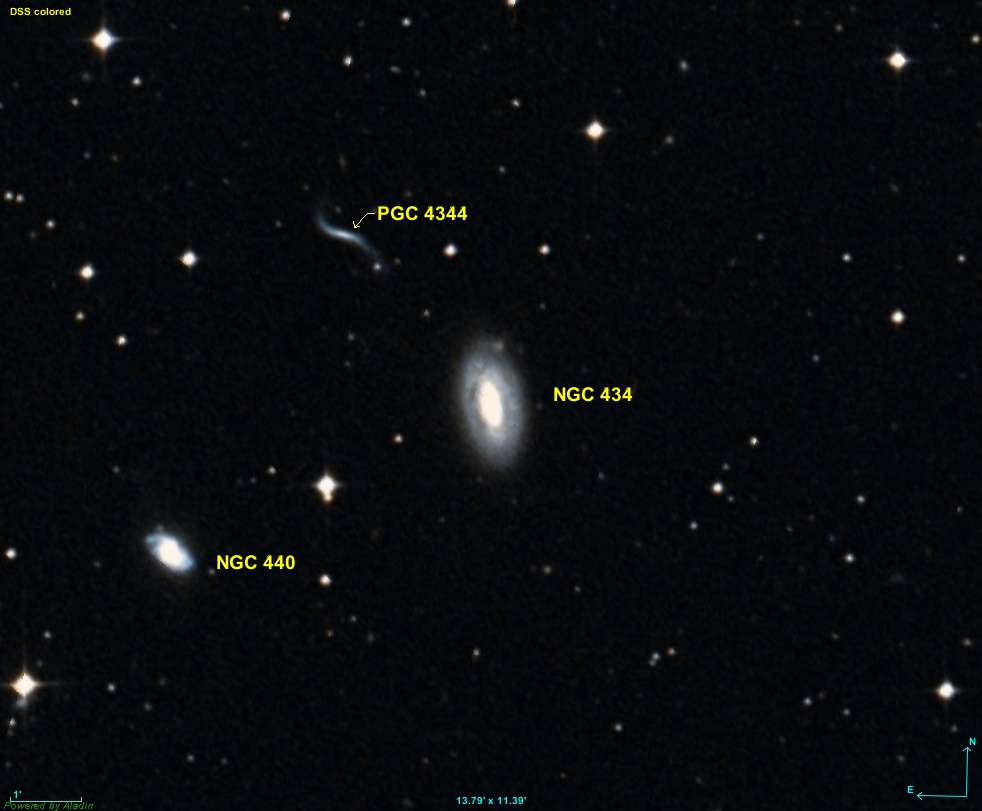
DSS image of NGC 434
