= NGC 484 =

Elliptical galaxy in the constellation Tucana

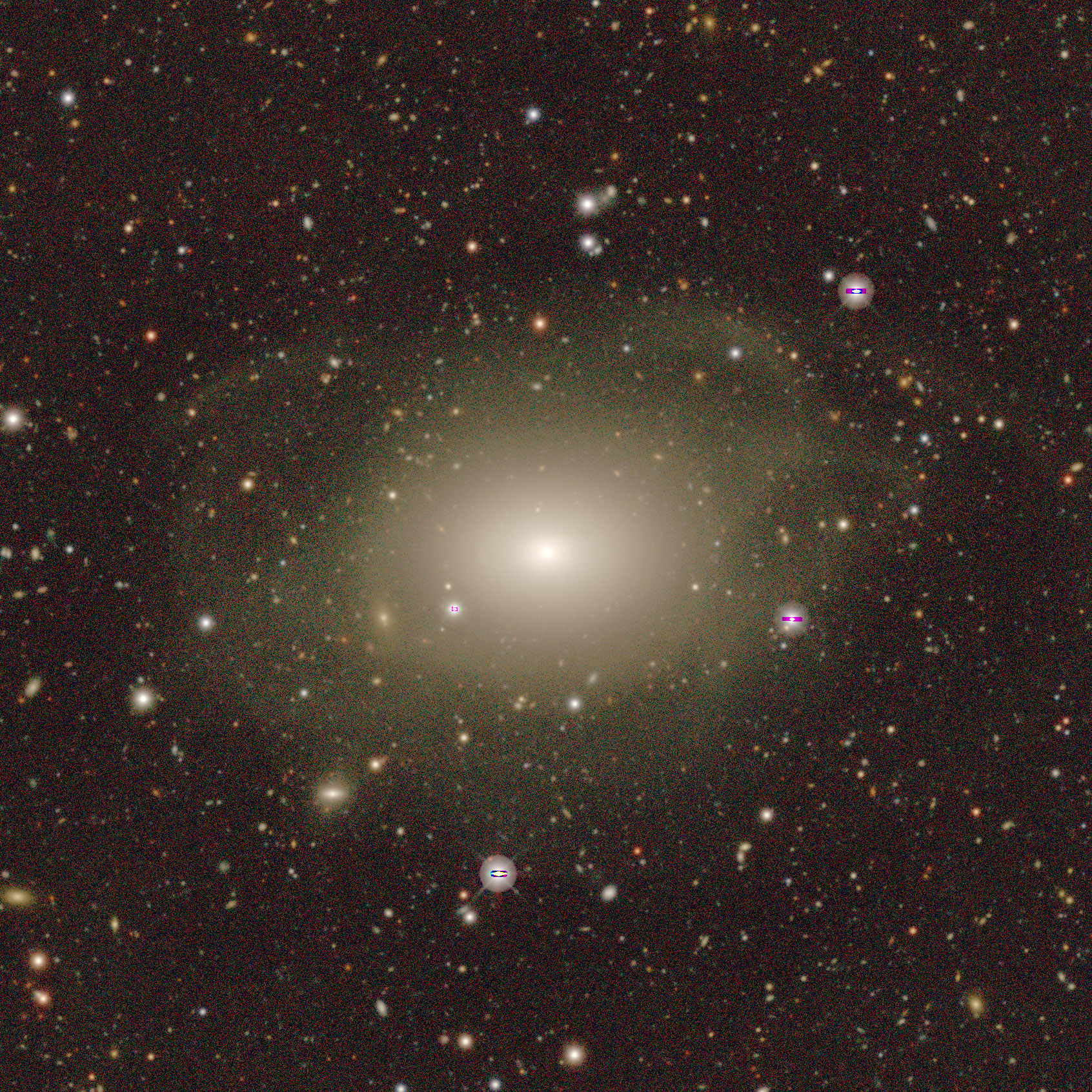
- NGC 484 with legacy surveys

Observation data (J2000 epoch)
- Constellation: Tucana
- Right ascension: 01^{h} 19^{m} 34.738^{s}
- Declination: −58° 31′ 27.92″
- Redshift: 0.01846 ± 0.00010
- Heliocentric radial velocity: (5128 ± 23) km/s
- Distance: 218 Mly
- Apparent magnitude (V): 11.2

Characteristics
- Type: SA(r)0- pec?
- Apparent size (V): 1.9′ × 1.4′

Other designations
- PGC 4764, GC 273, ESO 113–36, 2MASS J01193469-5831272, h 2406

NGC 484 is an elliptical galaxy in the constellation Tucana. It is located approximately 218 million light-years from Earth and was discovered on October 28, 1834 by astronomer John Herschel.

NGC 484 is part of a galaxy group known as NGC 434 Group or LGG 19. It has at least 10 members, which are NGC 434, NGC 440, NGC 466, NGC 434A, IC 1649, ESO 113-27, ESO 151-27, ESO 114-1 and ESO 113-35.

== See also ==
- List of galaxies
- List of NGC objects (1–1000)
