= NGC 440 =

Spiral galaxy in the constellation Tucana

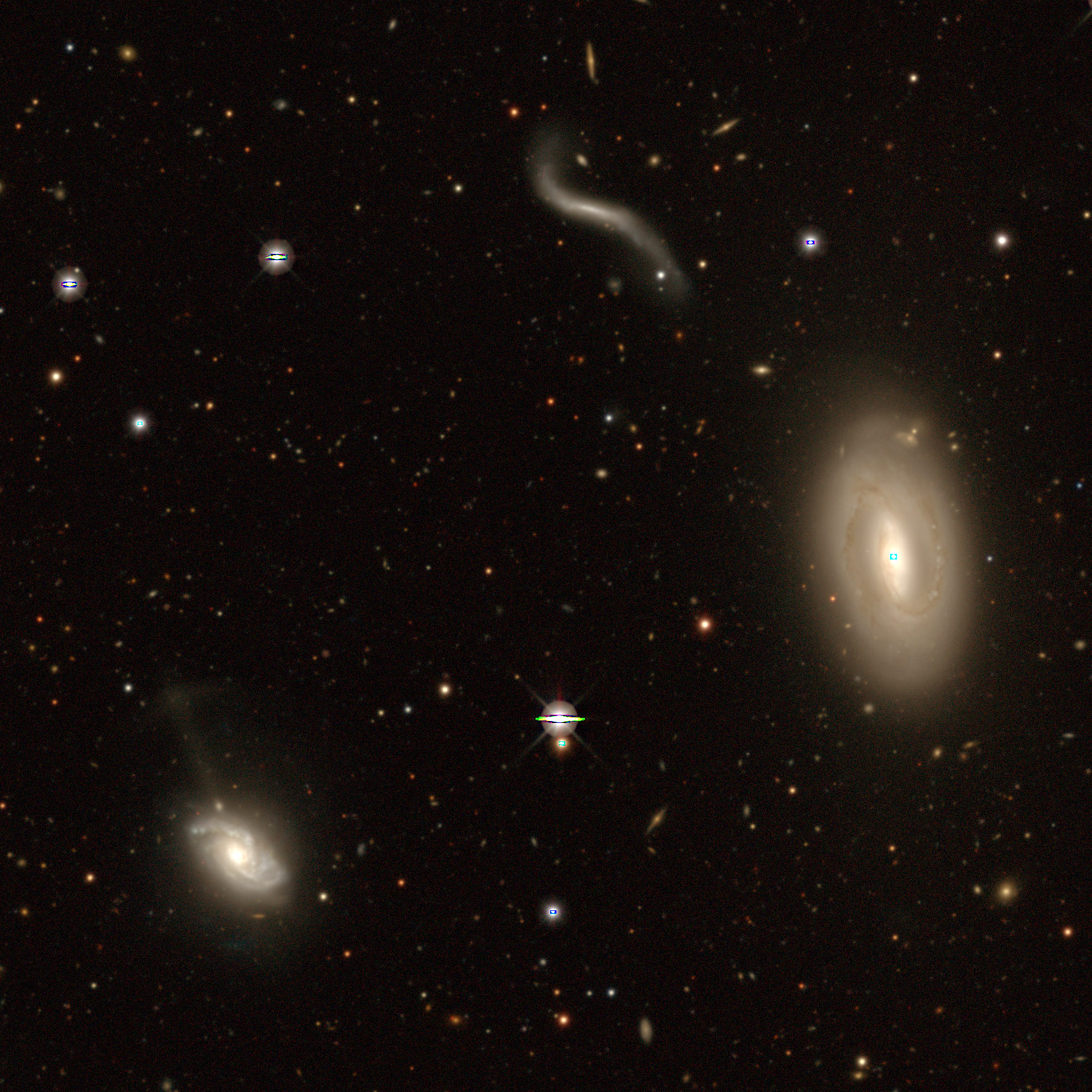
- NGC 440 is at the lower left side. NGC 434 is the galaxy at the middle right. Image by legacy surveys.

Observation data (J2000 epoch)
- Constellation: Tucana
- Right ascension: 01^{h} 12^{m} 48.5^{s}
- Declination: −58° 16′ 56″
- Redshift: 0.016725
- Heliocentric radial velocity: 5,014 km/s
- Apparent magnitude (V): 13.73
- Absolute magnitude (V): -21.50

Characteristics
- Type: SA(s)bc pec
- Apparent size (V): 1.1' × 0.7'

Other designations
- ESO 113- G 025, 2MASX J01124849-5816560, ESO-LV 1130250, PGC 4361.

NGC 440 is a spiral galaxy of type SA(s)bc pec located in the constellation Tucana. It was discovered on September 27, 1834, by John Herschel. It was described by Dreyer as "faint, very small, round."

NGC 440 is part of a galaxy group known as NGC 434 Group or LGG 19. It has at least 10 members, which are NGC 434, NGC 466, NGC 484, NGC 434A, IC 1649, ESO 113–27, ESO 151–27, ESO 114-1 and ESO 113–35.
