= NGC 7070A =

Galaxy in the constellation of Grus

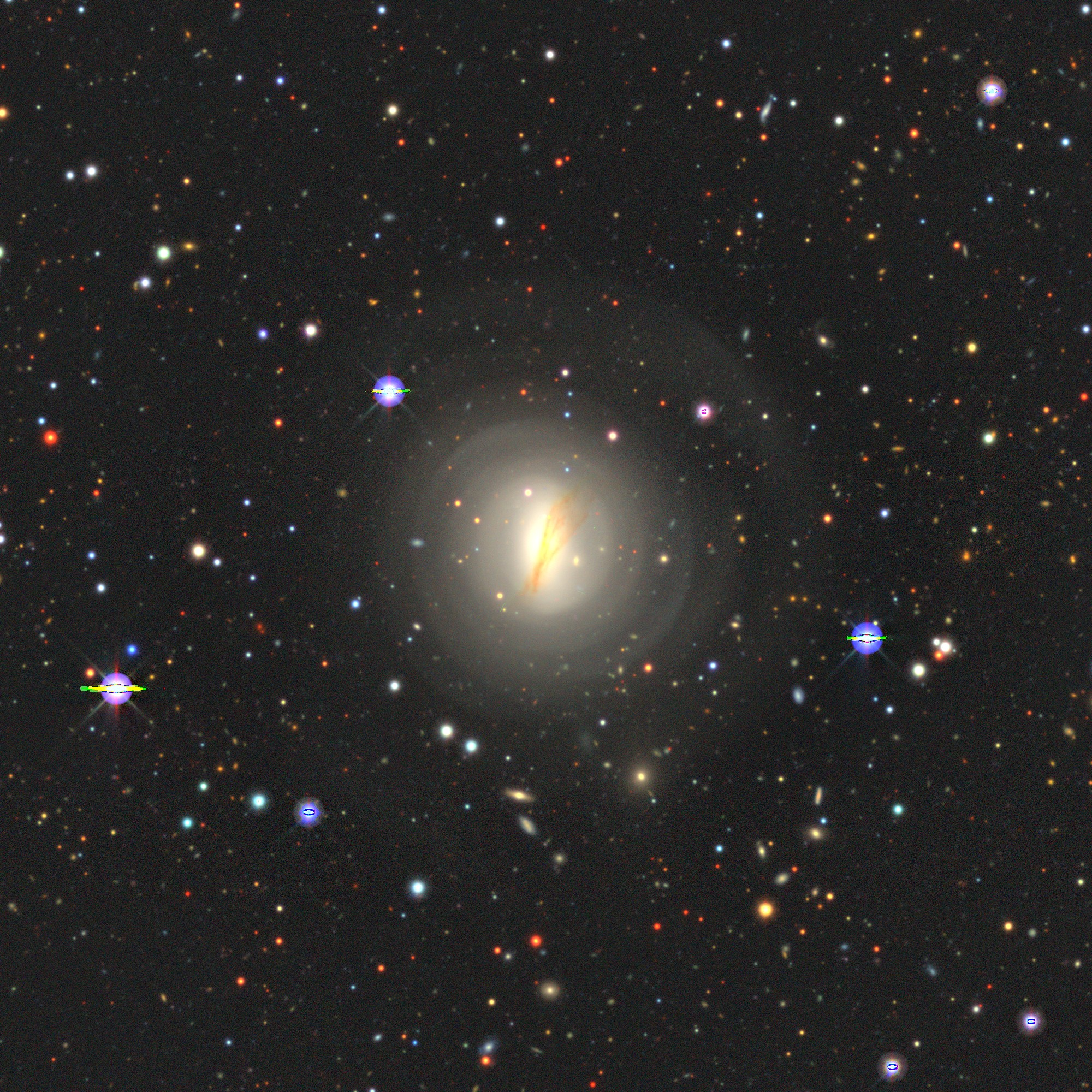
- NGC 7070A imaged by Legacy Surveys

Observation data (J2000 epoch)
- Constellation: Grus
- Right ascension: 21^{h} 31^{m} 47.3^{s}
- Declination: −42° 50′ 52″
- Redshift: 0.007976/2391 km/s
- Distance: 31.9 Mpc (104 Mly) (estimated)
- Apparent magnitude (V): 13.32

Characteristics
- Type: S0+pec
- Apparent size (V): 1.9 x 1.5
- Notable features: Strong dust lane

Other designations
- ESO 287-34, AM 2128-34, MCG -7-44-21, PGC 66909

NGC 7070A is a face-on lenticular galaxy located about 100 million light-years away in the constellation of Grus.

== Physical characteristics ==
NGC 7070A has a companion, the spiral galaxy NGC 7070 which are separated from each other at a projected distance of about 640,000 ly (195 kpc). It has dust lanes which cross it and incomplete shells surrounding it. Also, there are faint luminous tails extending from the galaxy towards NGC 7070. It is theorized that these features may have formed due to the accretion of a smaller disk galaxy about a billion years ago which got disrupted by NGC 7070A.

== Nearby galaxies ==
NGC 7070A is member of a group of galaxies known as the NGC 7079 Group.

== Active galactic nucleus ==
XMM-Newton observations of NGC 7070A show that the galaxy hosts moderate AGN activity.

== See also ==
- List of NGC objects (7001–7840)
- Centaurus A
- NGC 1316
