= NGC 7079 =

Galaxy in the constellation of Grus

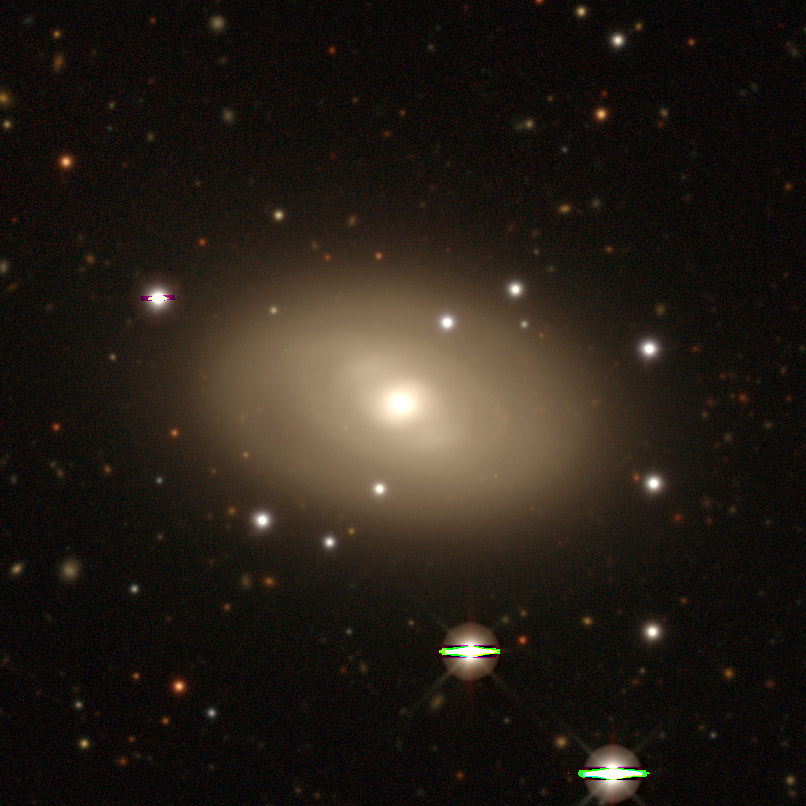
- Barred lenticular galaxy NGC 7079.

Observation data (J2000 epoch)
- Constellation: Grus
- Right ascension: 21^{h} 32^{m} 35.2^{s}
- Declination: −44° 04′ 03″
- Redshift: 0.00895
- Heliocentric radial velocity: 2,684 km/s
- Distance: 110.6 Mly
- Apparent magnitude (V): 11.6

Characteristics
- Type: SB0^0(s), LINER
- Apparent size (V): 2.1 x 1.3

Other designations
- ESO 287-36, AM 2129-441, MCG -7-44-22, PGC 66934

NGC 7079 is a barred lenticular galaxy located about 110.58 million light-years away in the constellation of Grus. NGC 7079 is also classified as a LINER galaxy. It is tilted about 51° to the Earth's line of sight. NGC 7079 was discovered by astronomer John Herschel on September 6, 1834.

== Physical characteristics ==
NGC 7079 has a faint cigar-shaped bar with ansae at the ends, and there is another very faint spiral structure surrounding it. The rim of the disk also has a somewhat faint ring-like structure.

=== Emission of doubly ionized oxygen gas ===
In NGC 7079, it has been indicated that there is a faint emission of doubly ionized oxygen. The ionized gas is rotating in the opposite direction of the stars in the galaxy. The counter-rotation has been attributed to the accretion of gas from outside of the galaxy.

== Group membership ==
NGC 7079 is a member of the NGC 7079 Group. The group, along with other nearby groups are part of the Pavo-Indus and Grus clouds of galaxies which form a connection between the Pavo–Indus and Virgo Superclusters. The other members of the NGC 7079 Group are NGC 7070, NGC 7070A, NGC 7097, NGC 7097A, ESO 287-37, ESO 287-39, ESO 287-41, and ESO 287-43.

== See also ==
- List of NGC objects (7001–7840)
- Lenticular galaxy
- NGC 936
- PGC 83677
