= IC 758 =

Galaxy in the constellation Ursa Major

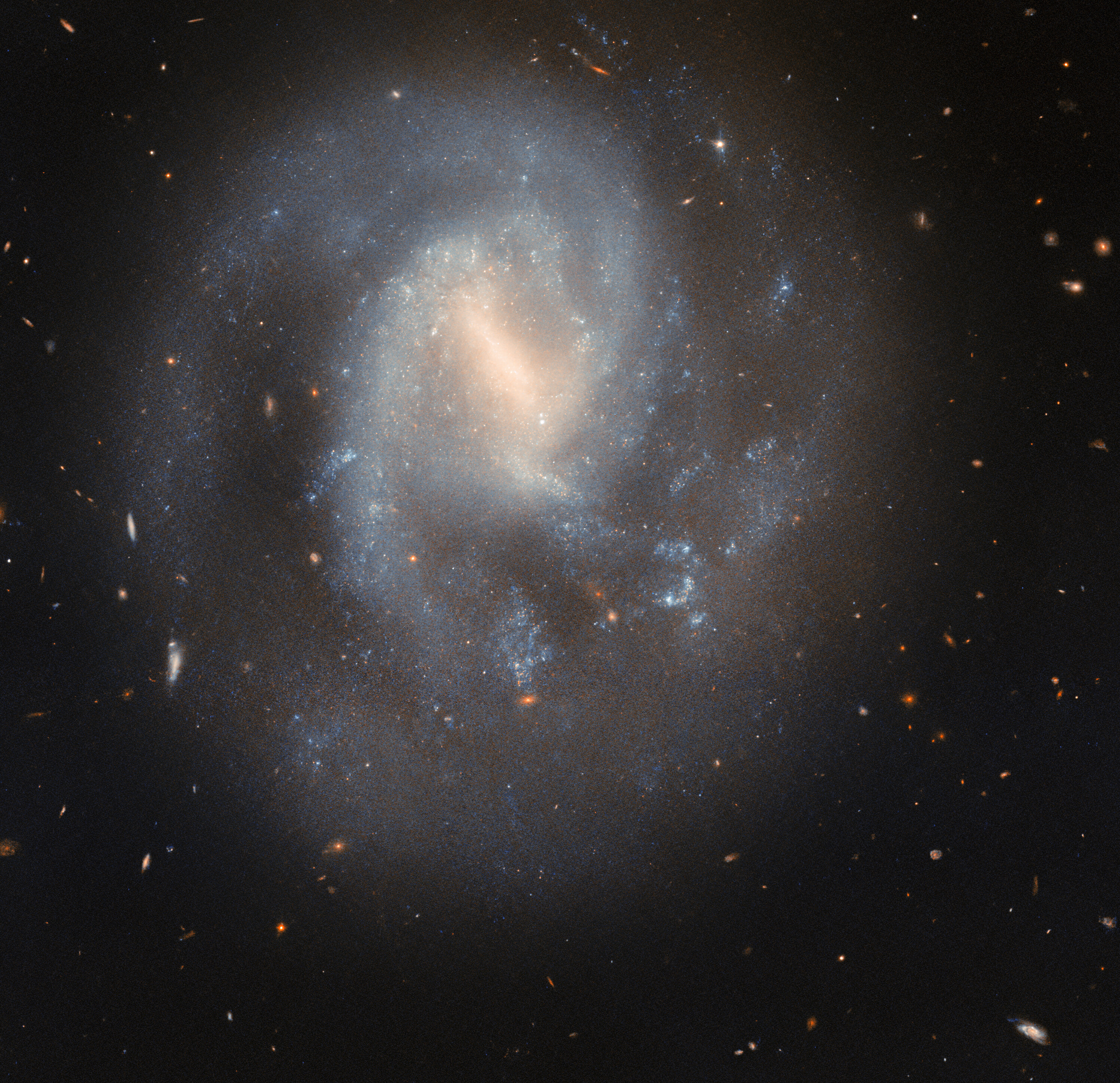
- IC 758 imaged by the Hubble Space Telescope

Observation data (J2000 epoch)
- Constellation: Ursa Major
- Right ascension: 12^{h} 04^{m} 11.9363^{s}
- Declination: +62° 30′ 19.199″
- Redshift: 0.004256±0.000006
- Heliocentric radial velocity: 1,276±2 km/s
- Distance: 87.08 ± 11.09 Mly (26.700 ± 3.400 Mpc)
- Group or cluster: NGC 4036 Group (LGG 266)
- Apparent magnitude (V): 14.2

Characteristics
- Type: SB(rs)cd:
- Size: ~50,700 ly (15.53 kpc) (estimated)
- Apparent size (V): 1.65′ × 1.15′

Other designations
- IRAS F12017+6246, UGC 7056, MCG +11-15-014, PGC 38173, CGCG 315-009

IC 758 is a barred spiral galaxy in the constellation of Ursa Major. Its velocity with respect to the cosmic microwave background is 1,402±9 km/s, which corresponds to a Hubble distance of 67.4 ± 4.7 Mly (20.67 ± 1.45 Mpc). However, two non-redshift measurements give a much farther distance of 87.08 ± 11.09 Mly (26.700 ± 3.400 Mpc). It was discovered by American astronomer Lewis Swift on 17 April 1888.

IC 758 is an active galactic nucleus candidate, i.e. it has a compact region at the center of a galaxy that emits a significant amount of energy across the electromagnetic spectrum, with characteristics indicating that this luminosity is not produced by the stars.

== NGC 4036 Group ==
According to A.M. Garcia, IC 758 is one of five members of the NGC 4036 galaxy group (also known as LGG 266), which includes NGC 4036, NGC 4041, UGC 7009, and UGC 7019. A more recent study claims this group has 13 members, adding the galaxies NGC 3945, PGC 37567, PGC 38027, PGC 2608163, PGC 4001456, PGC 4001735, PGC 4011191, and PGC 4074702. The NGC 4036 Group is part of the Ursa Major Cloud, which is part of the Virgo Supercluster.

== Supernova ==
One supernova has been observed in IC 758: SN 1999bg (Type II, mag. 15.5) was discovered by the Lick Observatory Supernova Search (LOSS) on 28 March 1999.

== See also ==
- List of IC objects
