= NGC 7302 =

Galaxy in the constellation Aquarius

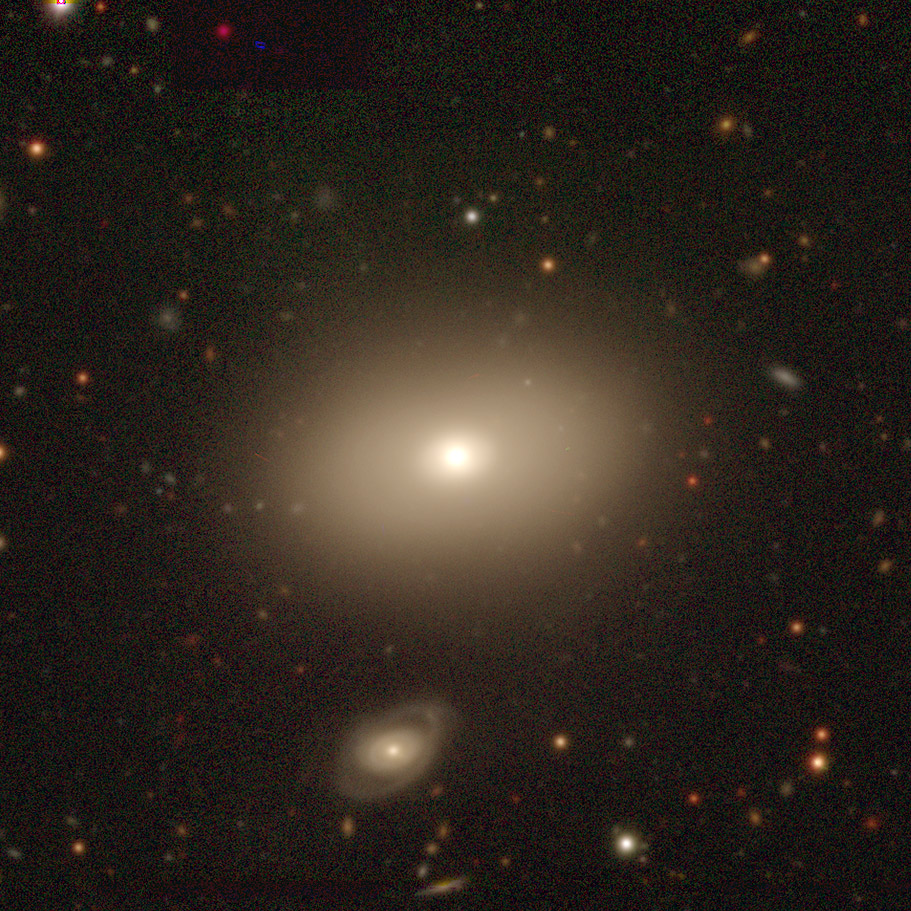
- The galaxy NGC 7302.

Observation data (J2000 epoch)
- Constellation: Aquarius
- Right ascension: 22^{h} 32^{m} 23^{s}
- Declination: −14° 07′ 15″
- Redshift: 0.0090
- Heliocentric radial velocity: 2,703 km/s
- Distance: 124 Mly
- Apparent magnitude (V): 12.3

Characteristics
- Type: SA0^{−}(s)
- Apparent size (V): 1.8'x 1.1'

Other designations
- PGC 69094, IC 5228, MCG -2-57-13

NGC 7302 is a lenticular galaxy located around 124 million light-years away from Earth in the constellation of Aquarius. NGC 7302 was discovered by British astronomer William Herschel on October 3, 1785 and was rediscovered by American astronomer Lewis Swift on August 8, 1896 and was listed in the IC catalogue as IC 5228. It is also part of a group of interacting galaxies.

== See also ==
- NGC 4036
- NGC 2787
