= NGC 7007 =

Galaxy in the constellation Indus

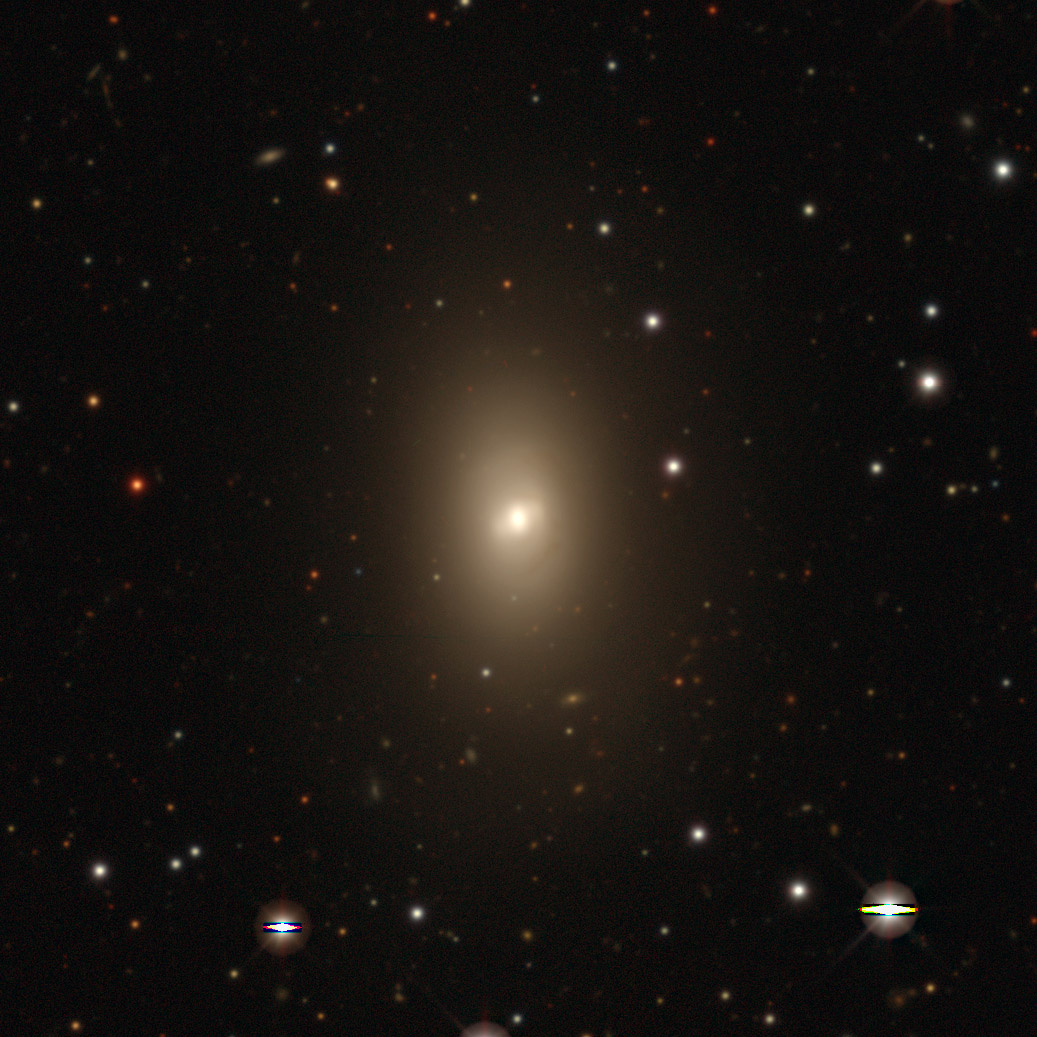
- Lenticular galaxy NGC 7007.

Observation data (J2000 epoch)
- Constellation: Indus
- Right ascension: 21^{h} 05^{m} 27.9^{s}
- Declination: −52° 33′ 07″
- Redshift: 0.010334
- Heliocentric radial velocity: 3098 km/s
- Distance: 99.61 Mly (30.540 Mpc)
- Apparent magnitude (V): 12.94
- Absolute magnitude (B): -20.94 ± 0.54

Characteristics
- Type: SA0
- Mass: 6×10^{10} (Stellar mass) M_{☉}
- Size: ~58,700 ly (18.00 kpc) (estimated)
- Apparent size (V): 1.9 × 1.1

Other designations
- ESO 187-48, PGC 66069

NGC 7007 is a barred lenticular galaxy with a small bar, around 100 million light-years away from Earth in the constellation Indus. It was discovered by astronomer John Herschel on July 8, 1834. The galaxy is a type 2 seyfert galaxy, and is host to a supermassive black hole with an estimated mass of 4.9 × 10^{7} M_{☉}.

Like all lenticular galaxies, NGC 7007 has a classical disk similar to most galaxies of its type, having a nearly spherical bulge. Unlike most galaxies of its type, the pattern of dust in NGC 7007 is not circular and continuous surrounding the bulge but shows breaks in its structure. These dust lanes also appear to form dusty spiral arms similar to the Sa galaxies NGC 2855, NGC 4984, and NGC 7377.

NGC 7007 is an isolated galaxy, with it a part of the Telescopium−Grus Cloud, a galaxy filament.

== Counter-rotating disk ==
In NGC 7007, there is a counter-rotating disk of ionized gas that counter-rotates with respect to the stars. This indicates an external origin of the gas such as accretion.

== See also ==
- NGC 7079 – a barred lenticular galaxy
- List of NGC objects (7001–7840)
