= NGC 4036 =

Galaxy in the constellation Ursa Major

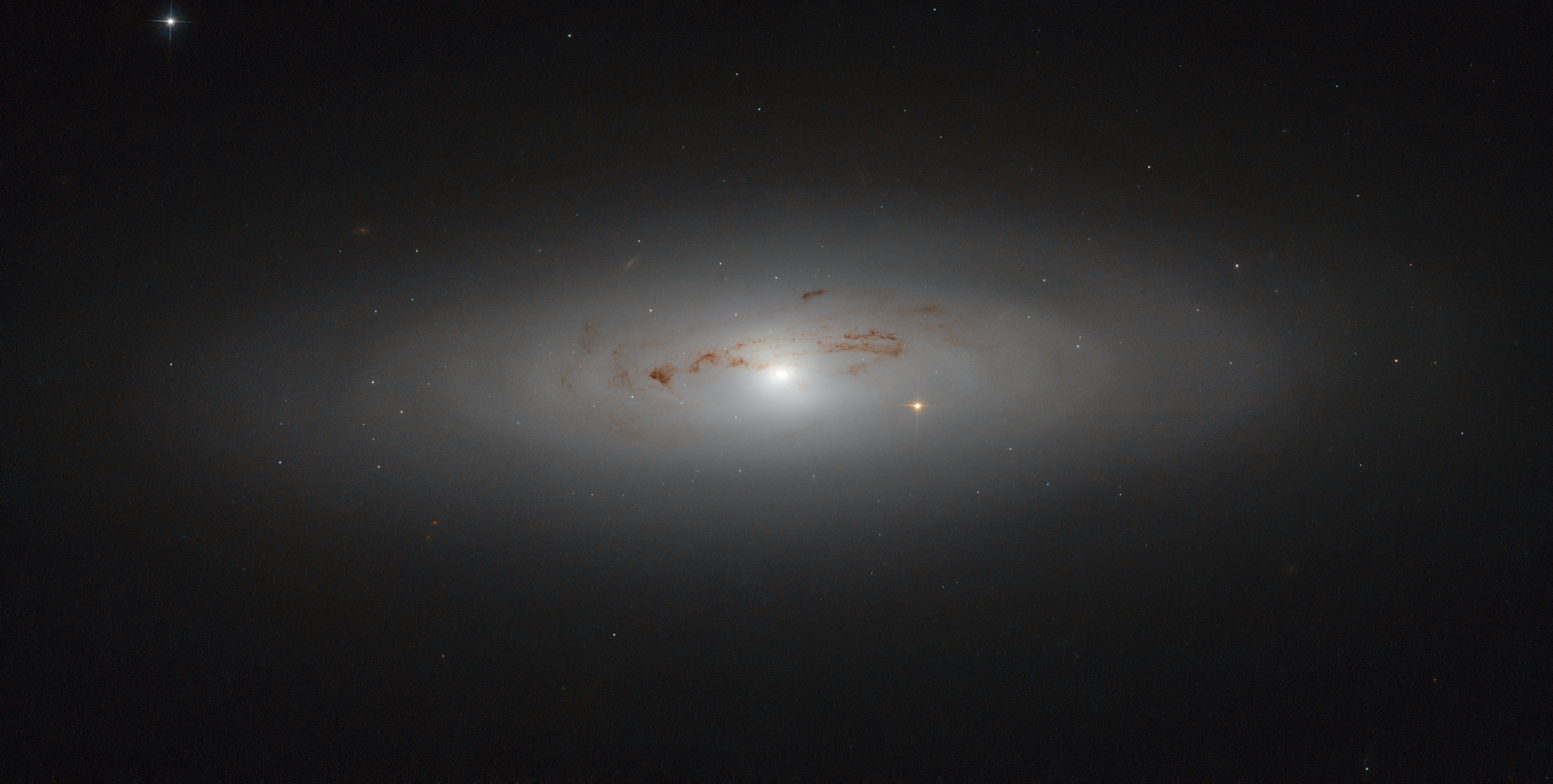
- NGC 4036 imaged by the Hubble Space Telescope

Observation data (J2000 epoch)
- Constellation: Ursa Major
- Right ascension: 12^{h} 01^{m} 26.891^{s}
- Declination: +61° 53′ 44.52″
- Redshift: 0.004817
- Heliocentric radial velocity: 1,445 km/s
- Distance: 62.1 Mly (19.04 Mpc)
- Group or cluster: LGG 266
- Apparent magnitude (V): 10.5
- Absolute magnitude (V): 10.66

Characteristics
- Type: S0^{−}
- Size: ~96,800 ly (29.67 kpc) (estimated)
- Apparent size (V): 2.703′ × 1.027′

Other designations
- IRAS 11588+6210, 2MASX J12012689+6153445, UGC 7005, LEDA 37930 , UZC J120126.7+615345, Z 292-59

NGC 4036 is a lenticular galaxy in the northern circumpolar constellation of Ursa Major. It was discovered by German-British astronomer William Herschel on 19 March 1790. In the Carnegie Atlas of Galaxies, it is described as being "characterized by an irregular pattern of dust lanes threaded through the disc in an 'embryonic' spiral pattern indicating a mixed S0/Sa form." It is located near the Big Dipper, a little to the north of the mid-way point between the stars Alpha Ursae Majoris and Delta Ursae Majoris. With a visual magnitude of 10.7, it can be dimly viewed using a 4 in (10 cm) aperture telescope.

The visual dimensions of this galaxy are 2.703′ × 1.027′ with the major axis having a position angle of 85°. The galaxy is being viewed nearly edge-on, with an inclination of 18° to the line of sight from the Earth. It is moving away from us with a heliocentric radial velocity of 1,445 km/s. The estimated visual luminosity of the galaxy is 4.2×10^{10} L_{☉}, or 42 billion times the brightness of the Sun. Photographs show a tightly wound spiral pattern in the galactic disk, with three dust lanes—the southern side of the galaxy appears dimmer due to the dust configuration. The mass of the free gas and dust in the galaxy is about 1.7×10^{9} M_{☉} and 4.4×10^{5} M_{☉}, respectively, with around 7×10^{4} M_{☉} of the gas being in an ionized state.

This is a type of active galaxy known as a LINER, which means that it shows emission lines of ionized gas in the region of its nucleus. Chemically, the stars at the center of the nucleus have a higher metallicity than in the neighboring regions. It appears that there is a tilted disk of stars orbiting the nucleus within a radius of 820 ly (250 pc). The galactic bulge itself appears triaxial with the ionized gas concentrated near the center of this bulge region. Images of the galaxy with the Hubble Space Telescope show a wispy disk of dust on all sides of the nucleus, with what appears to be the tendrilous remains of an ionization cone leading away 4 arc seconds to the northeast. Such features are common in Seyfert galaxies.

NGC 4036 is a member of the LGG 266 galaxy group (Also known as the NGC 4036 Group), along with NGC 4041, IC 758, UGC 7009, and UGC 7019. It is located just 17 arc minutes from NGC 4041, and the two form a pair with a projected separation of around 470 kly (143 kpc). The NGC 4036 Group is part of the Ursa Major Cloud, which is part of the Virgo Supercluster.

== Supernova ==
One supernova has been observed in NGC 4036. SN 2007gi (Type Ia, mag. 16.3) was discovered by Kōichi Itagaki on 23 July 2007, located near the central bulge of the galaxy. It reached peak magnitude around August 14, then steadily declined in brightness thereafter. Materials identified in the spectrum included silicon, calcium, and sulfur moving outward at velocities of around 15,500 km/s. This is a 50% higher velocity than what is normally observed with supernovae of this type.

== Gallery ==
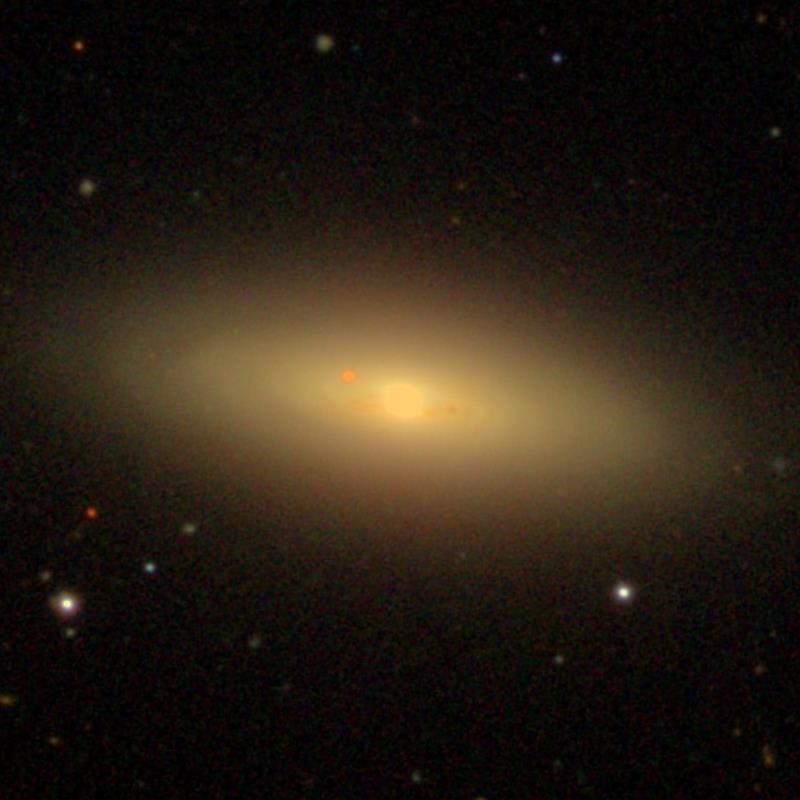
NGC 4036 (SDSS DR14)

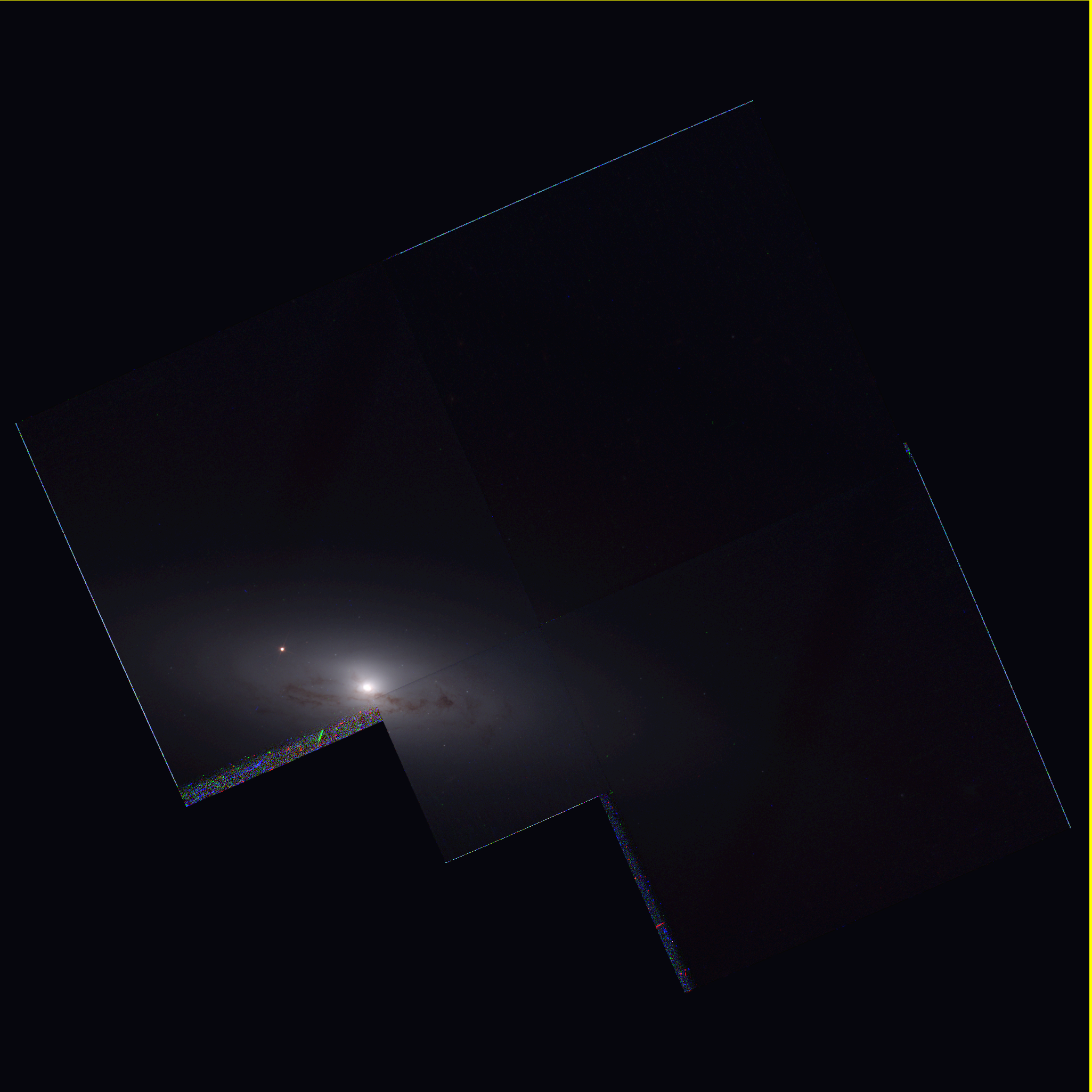
NGC 4036 (HST)
