= NGC 4041 =

Spiral galaxy in the constellation Ursa Major

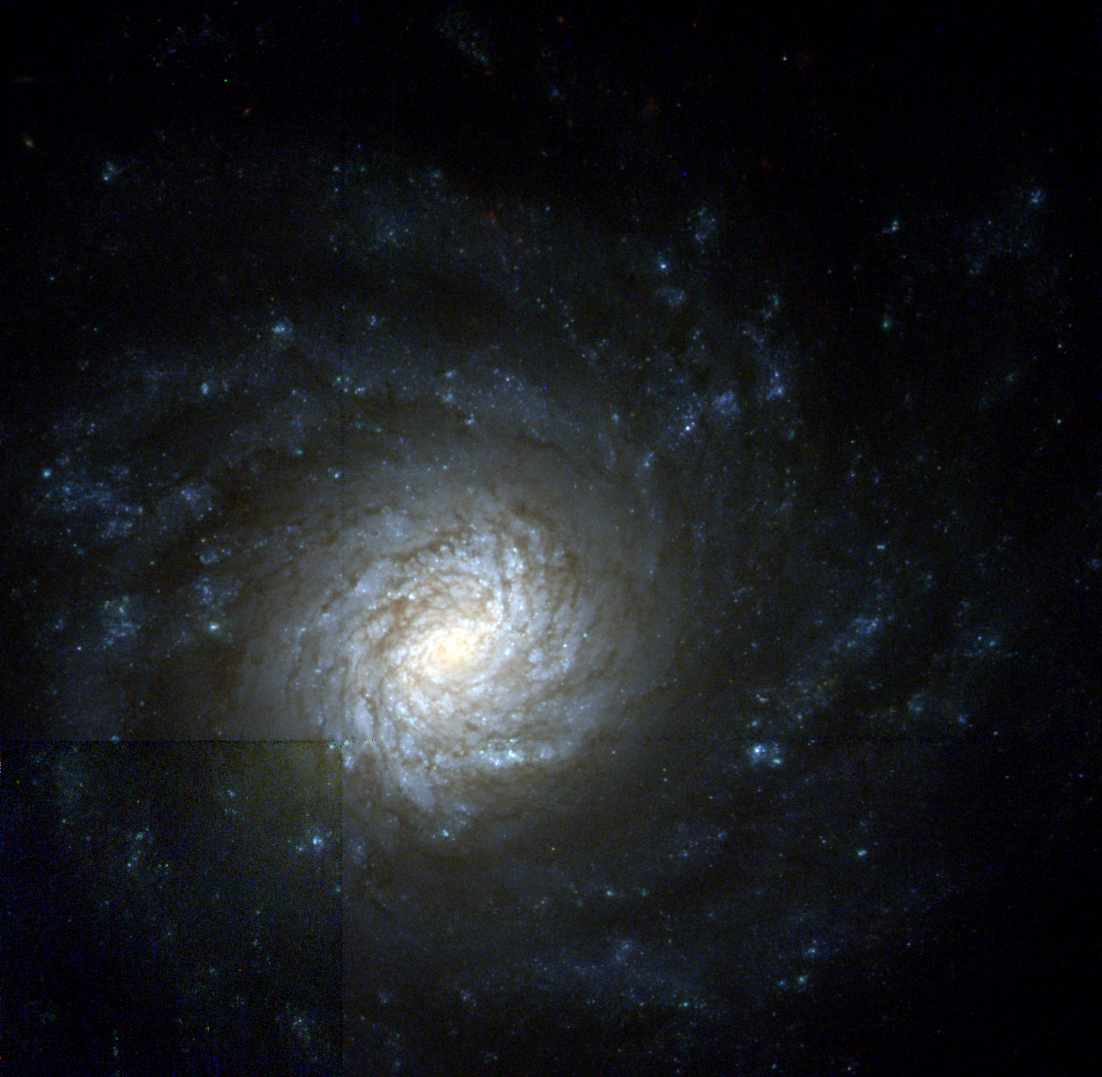
- NGC 4041 imaged by the Hubble Space Telescope

Observation data (J2000 epoch)
- Constellation: Ursa Major
- Right ascension: 12^{h} 02^{m} 12.173^{s}
- Declination: +62° 08′ 14.23″
- Redshift: 0.004113
- Heliocentric radial velocity: 1,214
- Distance: 70.4 Mly (21.57 Mpc)
- Group or cluster: LGG 266
- Apparent magnitude (V): 11.1

Characteristics
- Type: SA(rs)bc?
- Size: ~82,900 ly (25.41 kpc) (estimated)
- Apparent size (V): 1.697′ × 1.391′

Other designations
- IRAS 11596+6224, 2MASX J12021217+6208142, UGC 7014, LEDA 37999, MCG +10-17-129, CGCG 292-061

NGC 4041 is a spiral galaxy in the northern circumpolar constellation of Ursa Major. It is located an estimated 70 million light years from the Sun. It was discovered by the German-British astronomer William Herschel on 19 March 1790.

The morphological classification of SA(rs)bc indicates this is a spiral galaxy the lacks a bar; the 'rs' means it has a weakly-formed ring structure, and the 'bc' indicates the spiral arms are moderately to loosely wound.

The galaxy is inclined by around 20° to the line of sight from the Earth. It is forming new stars at the estimated rate of 4.10 M_{☉} yr^{−1}, which is fairly typical for a galaxy of this morphology. The star formation rate is much higher in the central region, which may be the result of recent merger with a dwarf galaxy within the last 100 million years.

This galaxy has no detected activity in the nuclear region. There is a rotating nuclear disk of high brightness at the core that is consistent with the presence of a compact mass of 1+0.6
−0.7×10^{7} M_{☉}. Most likely this is a supermassive black hole (SMBH).

NGC 4041 is a member of the LGG 266 galaxy group, (Also known as the NGC 4036 Group), along with NGC 4036, IC 758, UGC 7009, and UGC 7019. It is located just 17 arc minutes from NGC 4036, and the two form a pair with a projected separation of around 470 kly (143 kpc). The NGC 4036 Group is part of the Ursa Major Cloud, which is part of the Virgo Supercluster.

== Supernova ==
One supernova has been observed in NGC 4041:

- SN 1994W (Type II-P, mag. 13.5) was discovered by Giancarlo Cortini and Mirko Villi on 29 July 1994. The event reached peak visual magnitude on August 13, and declined thereafter. It was located about 19 arc seconds to the northwest of the nucleus. This supernova was unusual for the exceptionally low quantity of nickel-56 released—indeed, it was the lowest inferred amount measured for any Type II supernova as of that date. Based upon a possible detection of X-ray emission from the remnant, this may be a high-luminosity Type IIn supernova.

== See also ==
- List of NGC objects (4001–5000)
