= IC 5325 =

Galaxy in the constellation Phoenix

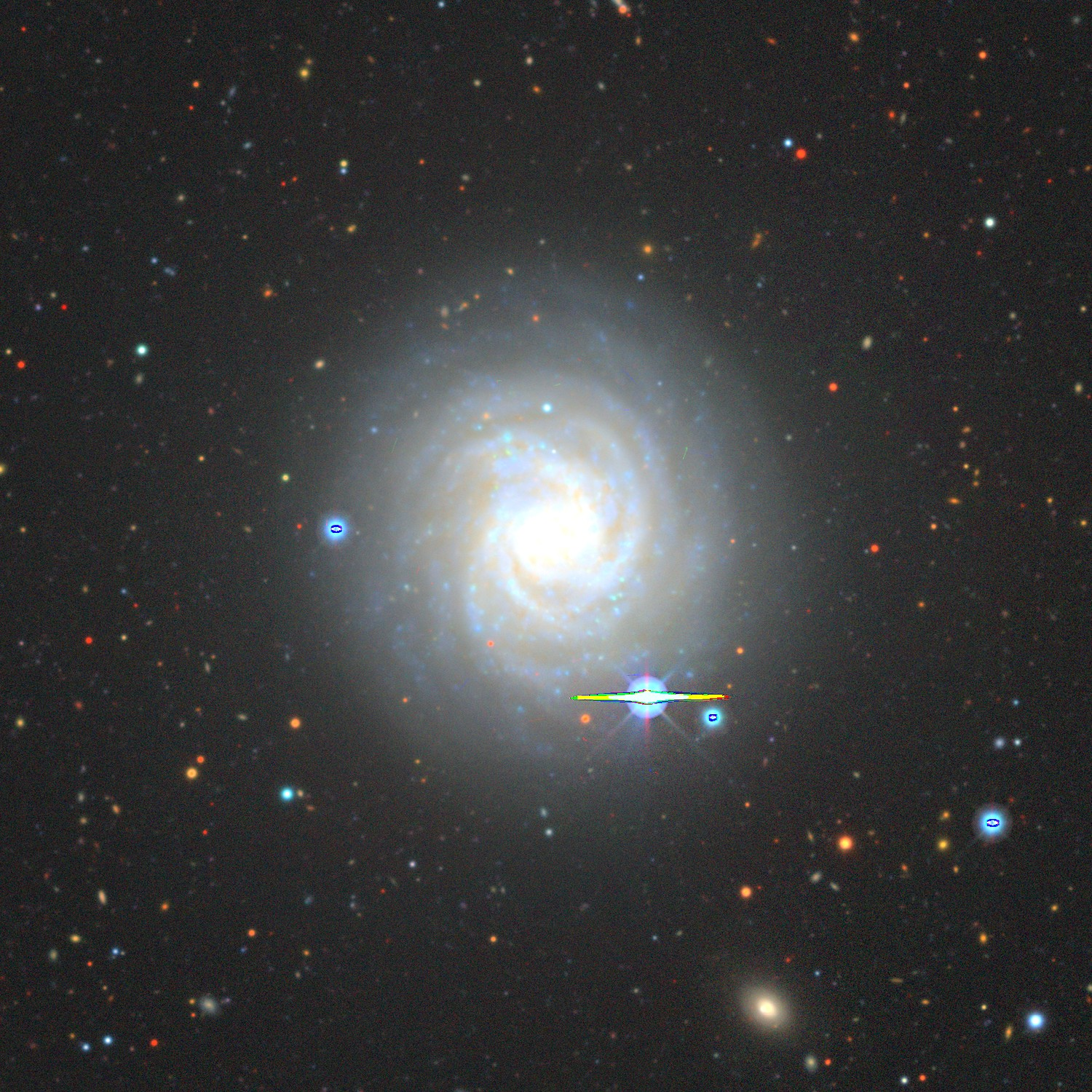
- IC 5325 imaged by Legacy Surveys

Observation data (J2000 epoch)
- Constellation: Phoenix
- Right ascension: 23^{h} 28^{m} 43.4728^{s}
- Declination: −41° 20′ 00.038″
- Redshift: 0.005013 ± 0.000023
- Heliocentric radial velocity: 1,503 ± 7 km/s
- Distance: 68.2 ± 4.9 Mly (20.9 ± 1.5 Mpc)
- Apparent magnitude (V): 11.0

Characteristics
- Type: SAB(rs)bc
- Size: ~74,000 ly (22.6 kpc) (estimated)
- Apparent size (V): 2.8′ × 2.5′

Other designations
- ESO 347- G 018, AM 2325-413, MCG -07-48-004, IRAS 23260-4136, PGC 71548

IC 5325 is a spiral galaxy in the constellation Phoenix. The galaxy lies about 70 million light years away from Earth, which means, given its apparent dimensions, that IC 5325 is approximately 75,000 light years across. It was discovered by Lewis Swift in 1897.

== Characteristics ==
IC 5325 is characterised as an intermediate spiral galaxy, with a weak bar. Its bulge is circular in its brightest region but it becomes oval at its fainter parts. At each end of the oval emerges a spiral arm. These two spiral arms are the most prominent. The galaxy has in total four significant arms and its spiral pattern is flocculent. The western arm has the higher surface brightness. The arms appear fragmented and with many blue knots. The galaxy is seen nearly face-on, at an inclination of about 25°.

As observed in ultraviolet by GALEX the inner region of the disk is brighter. IC 5325 is brighter in far ultraviolet than near ultraviolet, indicating intense star formation within the last 100 million years. The current star formation rate is estimated to be 0.31–0.41 M_{☉} per year. The galaxy doesn't appear to have significant amounts of cold dust. In the centre of the galaxy lies a supermassive black hole, whose mass is estimated to be 10^{6.97 ± 0.48} (3.1 - 28 millions) M_{☉}, based on the pitch angle of the spiral arms.

== Nearby galaxies ==
IC 5325 is a member of the NGC 7582 galaxy group. Other members of the group include NGC 7552, NGC 7582, NGC 7590, and NGC 7599, which are also known as the Grus Quartet, NGC 7531, NGC 7632, and NGC 7496. This group, along with the group centred around IC 1459 form the Grus Cloud, a region of elevated galaxy density. The Grus cloud, along with the nearby Pavo-Indus Cloud, lies between the Local Supercluster and Pavo–Indus Supercluster.

== Supernova ==
One supernova has been observed in IC 5325: SN 2013F (Type Ib/c, mag. 17.1) was discovered on 5 January 2013 by the Catalina Real-time Transient Survey and Stan Howerton.
