= NGC 7531 =

Galaxy in the constellation Grus

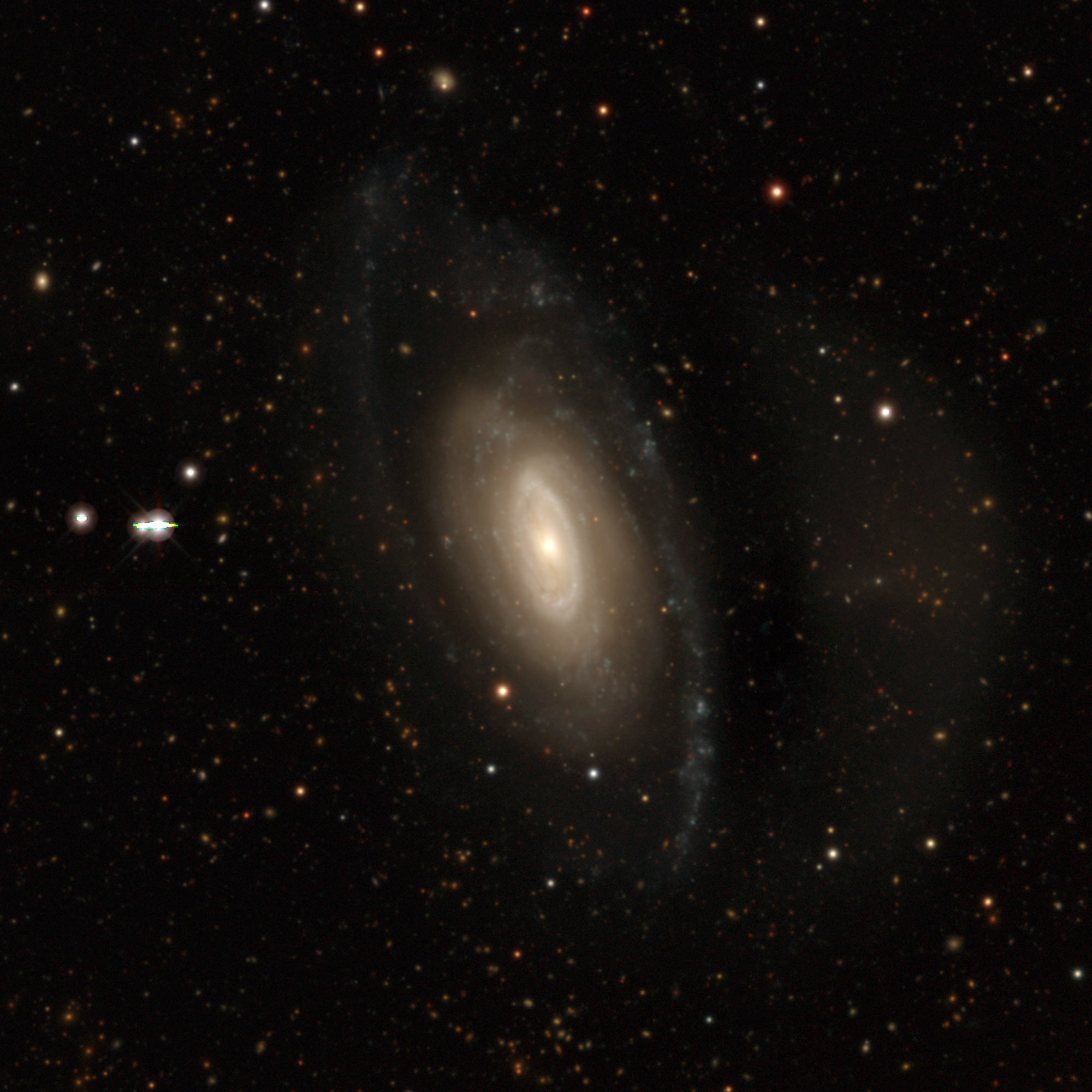
- NGC 7531 imaged by legacy surveys

Observation data (J2000 epoch)
- Constellation: Grus
- Right ascension: 23^{h} 14^{m} 48.5^{s}
- Declination: −43° 35′ 59.8″
- Redshift: 0.005324 ± 0.000010
- Heliocentric radial velocity: 1,596 ± 3 km/s
- Distance: 72.4 ± 16 Mly (22.2 ± 4.9 Mpc)
- Apparent magnitude (V): 11.3

Characteristics
- Type: SAB(r)bc
- Apparent size (V): 4.5′ × 1.8′

Other designations
- ESO 291- G010, AM 2312-435, MCG -07-47-025, PGC 70800

NGC 7531 is an intermediate spiral galaxy located in the constellation Grus. It is located at a distance of about 70 million light-years from Earth, which, given its apparent dimensions, means that NGC 7531 is about 95,000 light years across. It was discovered by John Herschel on September 2, 1836.

== Characteristics ==
The inner region of NGC 7531 is characterized by a high surface brightness ring. The ring is a place of active star formation and a number of star clusters and H II regions have been identified in it. The star formation rate of the inner ring is estimated to be 0.41 ± 0.12 M_{☉} per year based on H-alpha emission. A weak bar is observed in the near infrared inside the ring, along with dust lanes. Yet, the motions at the inner ring are predominately circular. The inner ring may lie at the location of the inner Lindblad resonance.

The galaxy has two patchy spiral arms that are relatively well defined but are of low surface brightness. H II regions have also been observed at the spiral arms of the galaxy, where there is also active star formation, which is more intense at the southwest region. A supermassive black hole is believed to lie in the centre of the galaxy whose mass is estimated to be 3–48 million (10^{7.07±0.61}) M_{☉}, based on the spiral arm pitch angle. The galaxy is seen with an inclination of 66°.

== Nearby galaxies ==
In long exposure photographic plates of the galaxy, a large low surface brightness region structure was observed 2.6 arcminutes west from the nucleus of the galaxy, that has more than half the apparent diameter of NGC 7531. It has been identified as a stellar cloud that may be a dwarf satellite of the galaxy or a shell created by the tidal disruption of NGC 7531.

NGC 7531 is a member of the NGC 7582 galaxy group. Other members of the group include NGC 7552, NGC 7582, NGC 7590, and NGC 7599, which are also known as the Grus Quartet, NGC 7496, NGC 7632, and IC 5325. This group, along with the group centred around IC 1459 form the Grus cloud, a region of elevated galaxy density. The Grus Cloud, along with the nearby Pavo-Indus Cloud, lies between the Local Supercluster and Pavo–Indus Supercluster.

== Supernova ==
One supernova has been observed in NGC 7531:

- SN 2012dj (Type Ib/c), mag. 15.3) was discovered by Stuart Parker on 1 July 2012.

== See also ==
- NGC 4622, and NGC 5364 - two similar spiral galaxies with inner rings
- Messier 94 - spiral galaxy with a similar inner ring
