= NGC 7496 =

Galaxy in the constellation Grus

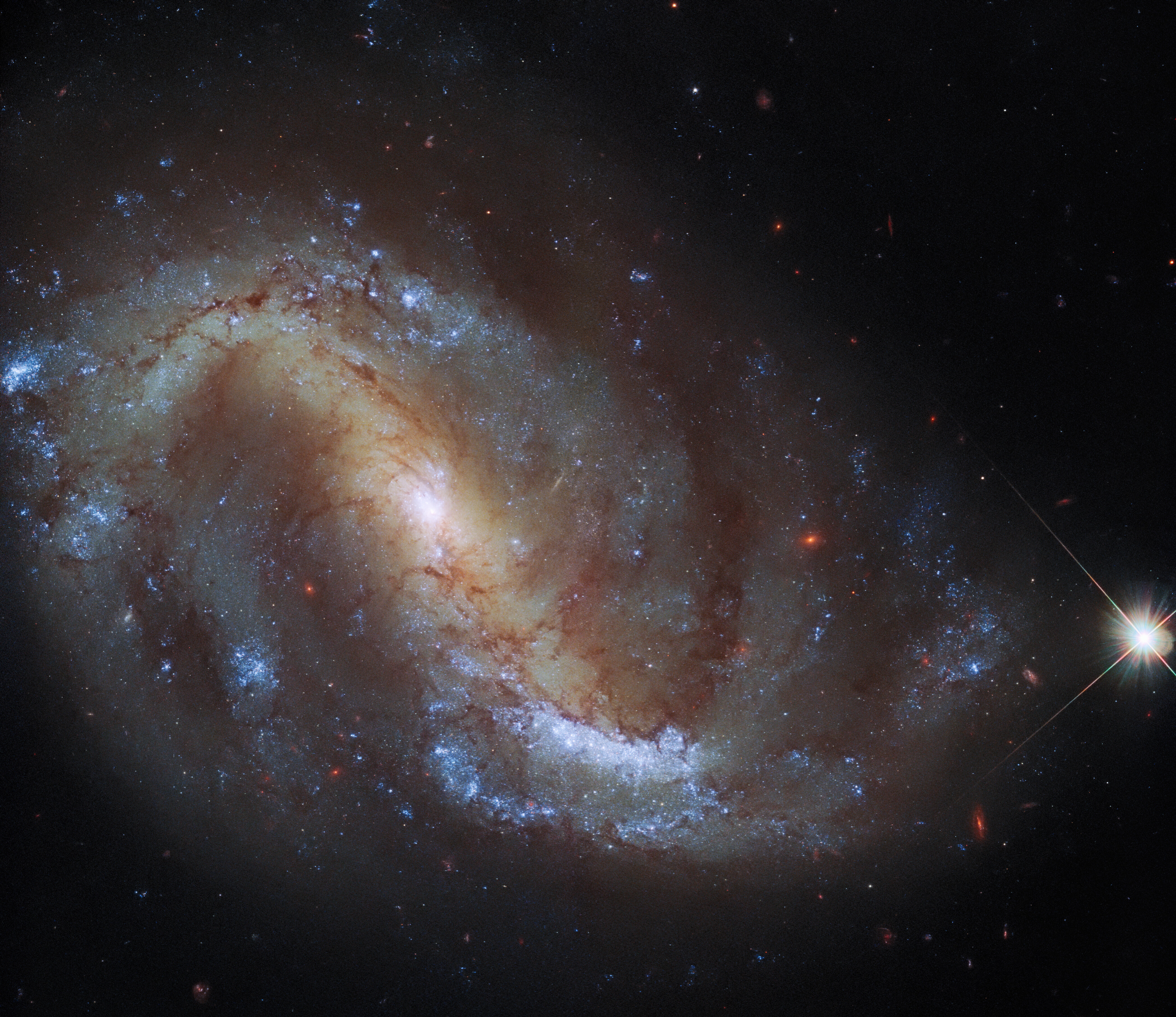
- NGC 7496 by the Hubble Space Telescope

Observation data (J2000 epoch)
- Constellation: Grus
- Right ascension: 23^{h} 09^{m} 47.2903^{s}
- Declination: −43° 25′ 40.331″
- Redshift: 0.005500 ± 0.000018
- Heliocentric radial velocity: 1,649 ± 5 km/s
- Distance: 61 Mly (18.7 Mpc)
- Apparent magnitude (V): 11.1

Characteristics
- Type: (R':)SB(rs)bc
- Apparent size (V): 3.3′ × 3.0′
- Notable features: Seyfert galaxy, starburst galaxy

Other designations
- ESO 291- G001, IRAS 23069-4341, MCG -07-47-020, PGC 70588, VV 771

NGC 7496 is a barred spiral galaxy located in the constellation Grus. It is located at a distance of about 60 million light-years from Earth, which, given its apparent dimensions, means that it is 75,000 light years across. It was discovered by British astronomer John Herschel on September 5, 1834. It is a type II Seyfert galaxy with high star formation rate around the nucleus.

== Characteristics ==
The nucleus of the galaxy has been found to be active and it has been categorised as a type II Seyfert galaxy. The nucleus has fairly strong emission lines in the optical wavelengths and an intense source of ultraviolet radiation. The spectrum also revealed the presence of an HII region in the nucleus, indicating the presence of young hot stars. The nucleus is also a source of radio waves. The most accepted theory for the energy source of active galactic nuclei is the presence of an accretion disk around a supermassive black hole.

NGC 7496 was one of the first galaxies to be examined by the James Webb Space Telescope, in June 2022, as part of the Physics at High Angular resolution in Nearby GalaxieS (PHANGS)–JWST survey, whose goal was to study star formation and the interstellar medium in nearby galaxies. The mid infrared images revealed filaments and cavities created by the stellar wind of young stars. Imaging of 3.3 μm polycyclic aromatic hydrocarbons (PAH) emission, which is caused the ultraviolet radiation being reprossesed by dust, revealed the presence of 67 candidate star clusters embedded in dust. The age of these clusters was estimated to be less than 2 million years while their mass was estimated to be 10^{4}–10^{5} M_{☉}. Their location was also correlated with H-alpha and CO(2–1) emission.

Clumpy ultraviolet emission has been observed from the spiral arms of the galaxy. Massive stellar complexes are present in the northern arm, and regions with young stellar complexes are found at the ends of both arms. The stars in these complexes are estimated to be less than 200 million years old. Photometry across various wavelengths indicates the presence of very cold dust in the galaxy.

== Nearby galaxies ==
NGC 7496 is a member of the NGC 7582 galaxy group. Other members of the group include NGC 7552, NGC 7582, NGC 7590, and NGC 7599, which are also known as the Grus Quartet, NGC 7531, NGC 7632, and IC 5325. This group, along with the group centred around IC 1459 form the Grus Cloud, a region of elevated galaxy density. The Grus Cloud, along with the nearby Pavo-Indus Cloud, lies between the Local Supercluster and Pavo–Indus Supercluster.

== Gallery ==
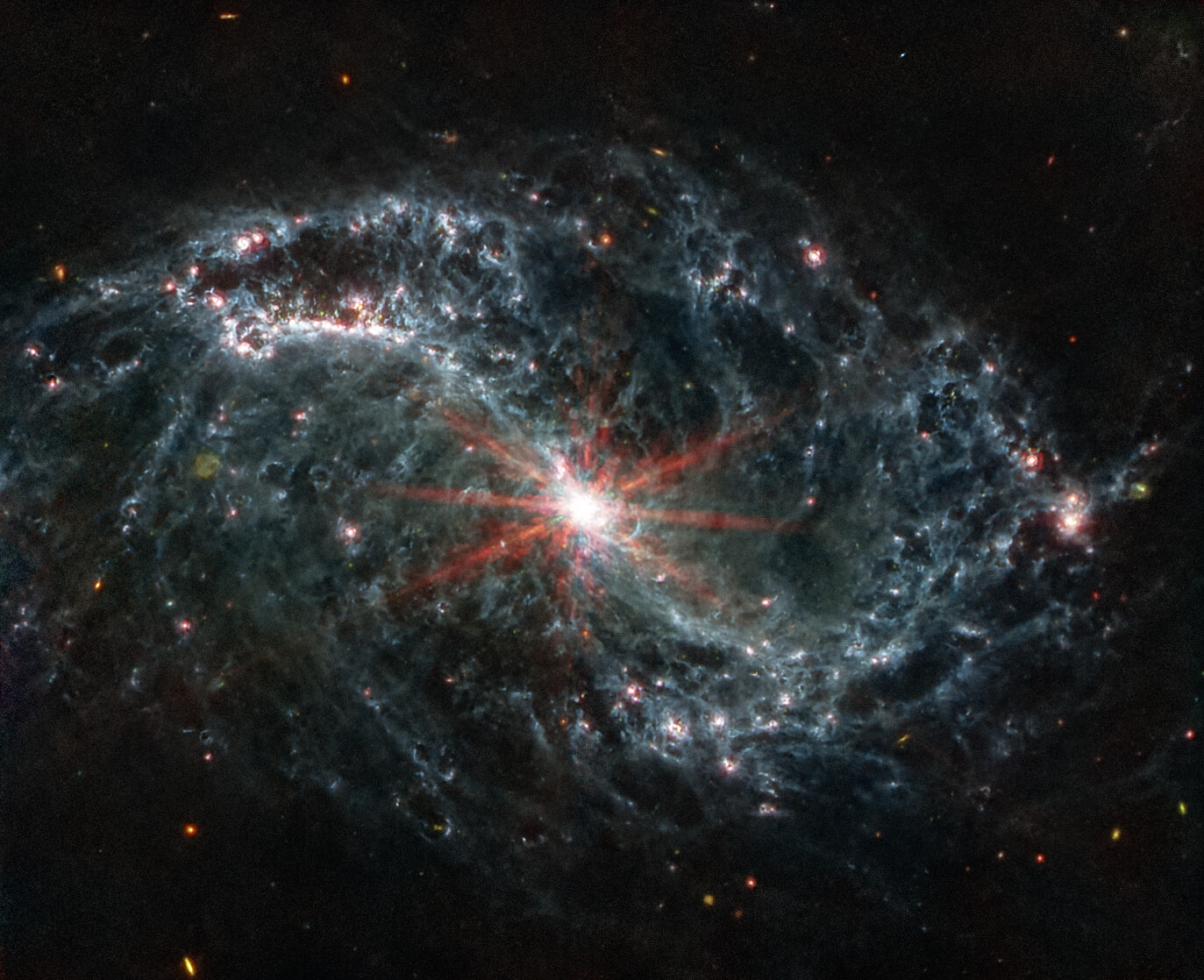
The galaxy in mid infrared by the James Webb Space Telescope

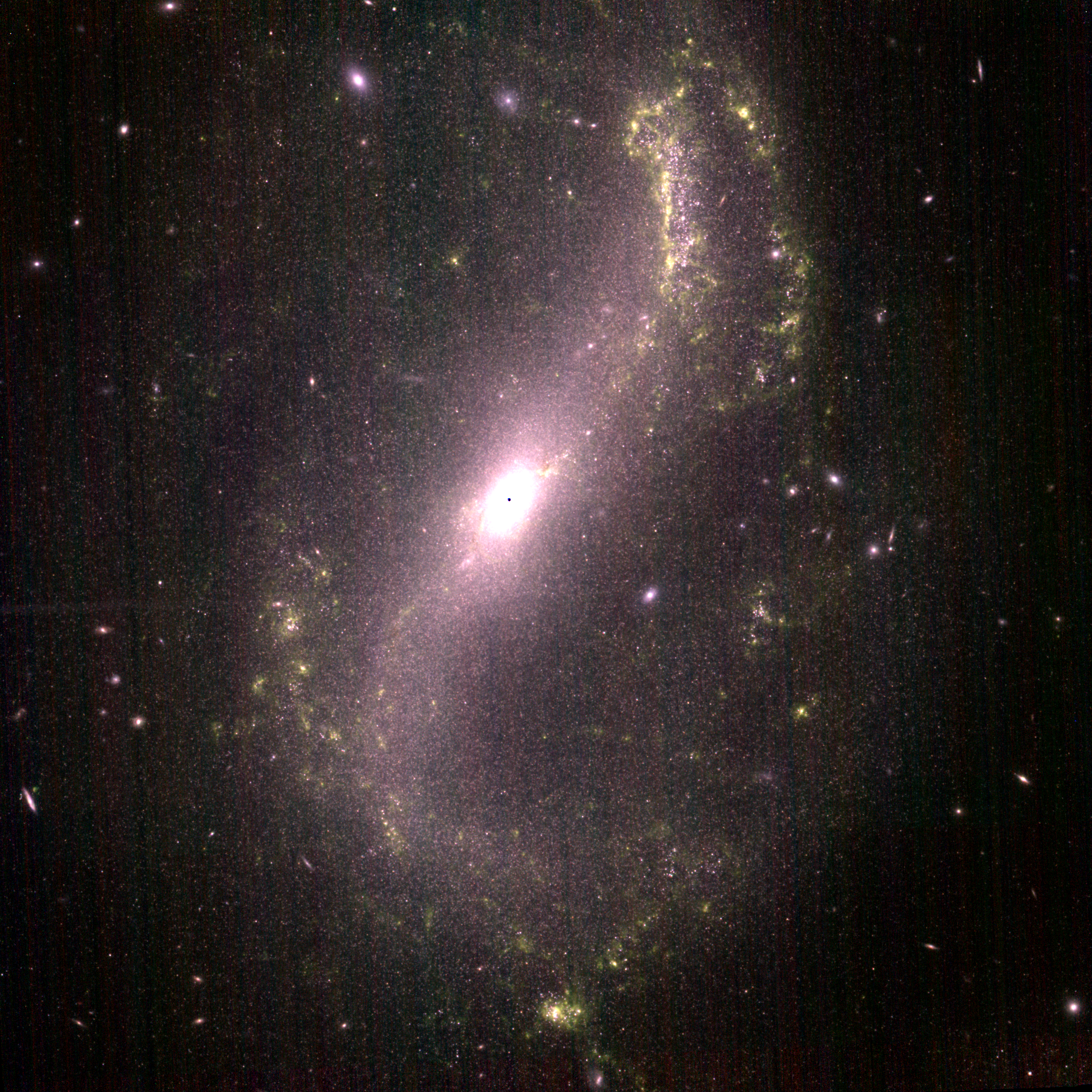
The galaxy in near infrared by JWST

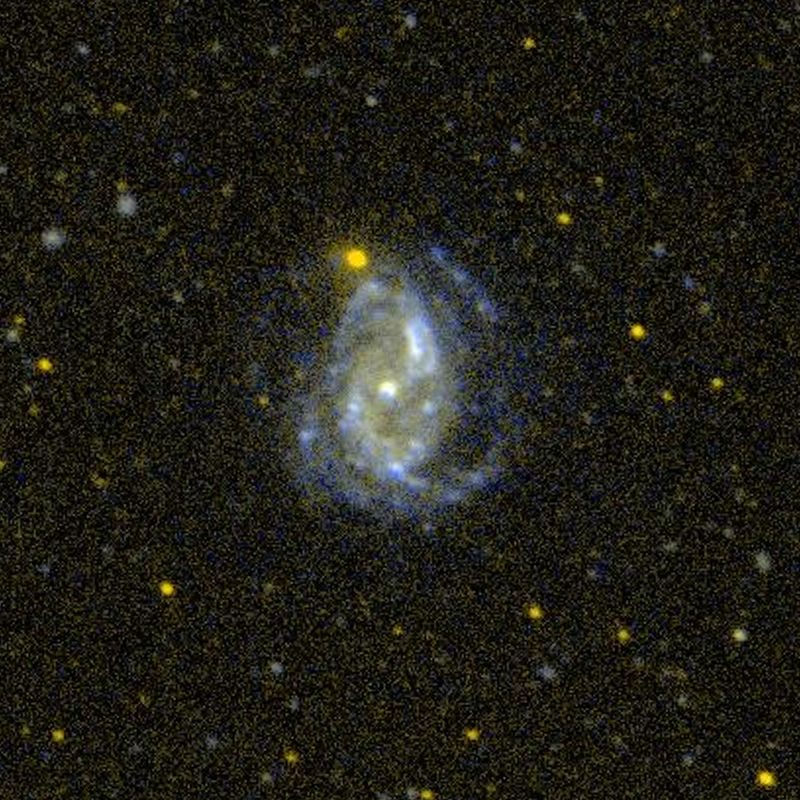
The galaxy in ultraviolet by GALEX

== See also ==
- NGC 7479 - a similar barred galaxy
- List of NGC objects (7001–7840)
