= NGC 7456 =

Galaxy in the constellation Grus

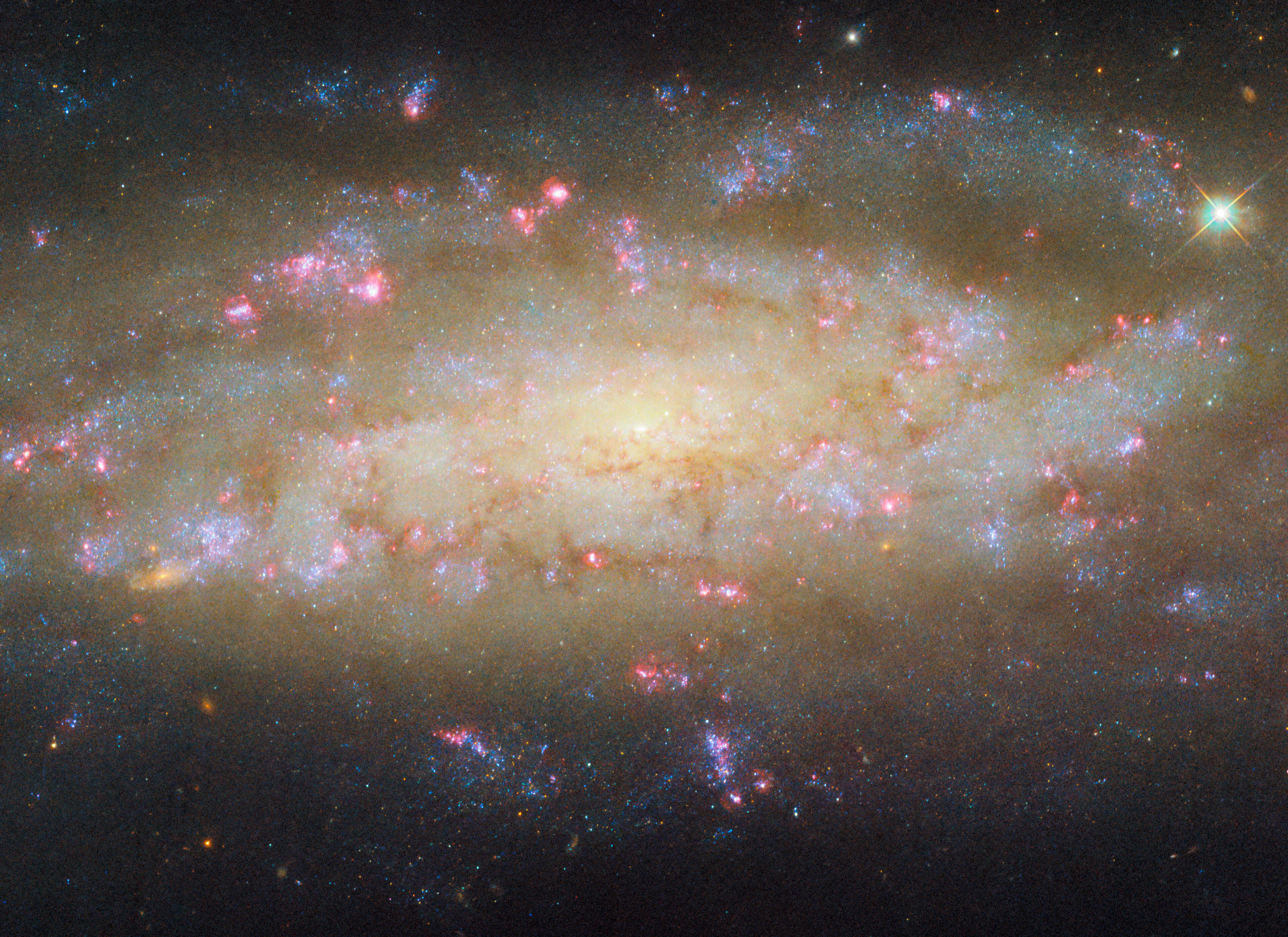
- NGC 7456 imaged by the Hubble Space Telescope

Observation data (J2000 epoch)
- Constellation: Grus
- Right ascension: 23^{h} 02^{m} 10.3631^{s}
- Declination: −39° 34′ 09.804″
- Redshift: 0.003999±0.000007
- Heliocentric radial velocity: 1,199±2 km/s
- Distance: 50.33 ± 2.11 Mly (15.430 ± 0.648 Mpc)
- Group or cluster: LDC 1547 group
- Apparent magnitude (V): 12.78

Characteristics
- Type: SA(s)cd
- Size: ~117,100 ly (35.91 kpc) (estimated)
- Apparent size (V): 5.5′ × 1.6′
- Notable features: Multiple X-ray sources

Other designations
- ESO 346- G 026, IRAS 22594-3950, MCG -07-47-011, PGC 70304

NGC 7456 is a spiral galaxy in the constellation of Grus. Its velocity with respect to the cosmic microwave background is 944±18 km/s, which corresponds to a Hubble distance of 45.4 ± 3.3 Mly (13.92 ± 1.01 Mpc). Additionally, 23 non-redshift measurements give a farther mean distance of 50.33 ± 2.11 Mly (15.430 ± 0.648 Mpc). It was discovered by British astronomer John Herschel on 4 September 1834.

NGC 7456 is a Seyfert II galaxy, i.e. it has a quasar-like nucleus with very high surface brightnesses whose spectra reveal strong, high-ionisation emission lines, but unlike quasars, the host galaxy is clearly detectable.

== X-ray sources ==
NGC 7456 contains as many as five ultraluminous X-ray sources. ULX-1 exhibits pronounced variability, with its flux changing over intervals ranging from several hundred seconds to a few kiloseconds, representing one of the most extreme flux fluctuations recorded among ULXs. Two of the five sources are considered transient ULX candidates.

== LDC 1547 group ==
NGC 7456 is a member of the LDC 1547 galaxy group, which contains 16 galaxies, including NGC 7404, NGC 7410, NGC 7418, NGC 7421, NGC 7424, NGC 7462, IC 1459, IC 5264, IC 5269, IC 5270, IC 5271, IC 5273, and 3 galaxies from the ESO Catalogue.

== Image gallery ==
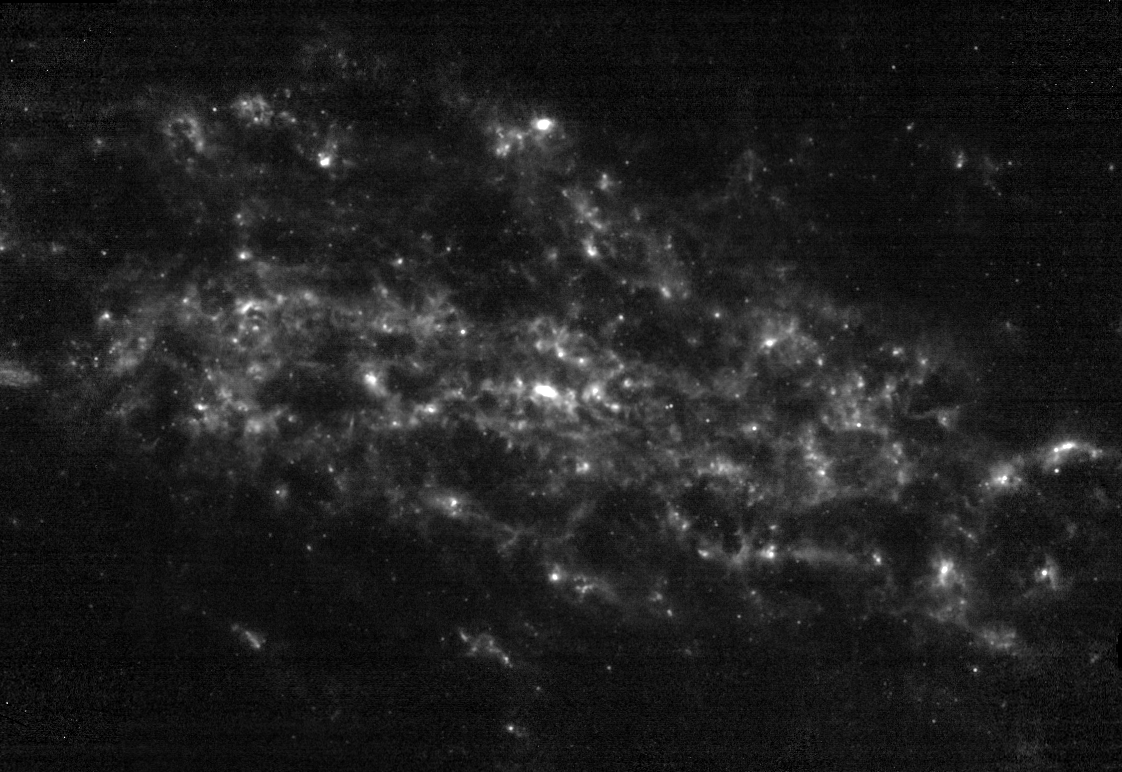
NGC 7456 imaged by the James Webb Space Telescope

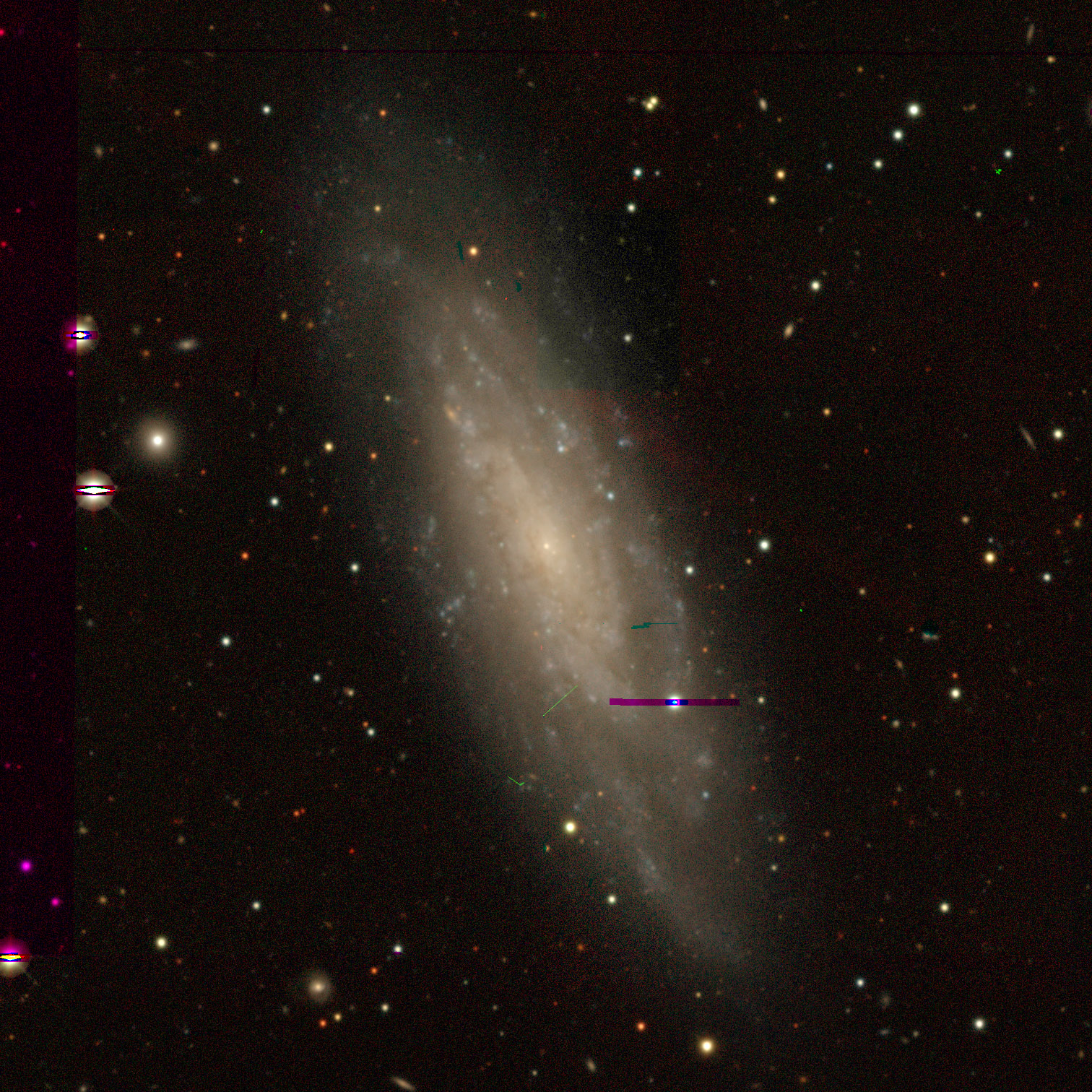
NGC 7456 imaged by Legacy Surveys

== See also ==
- List of NGC objects (7001–7840)
