= NGC 7412 =

Galaxy in the constellation Grus

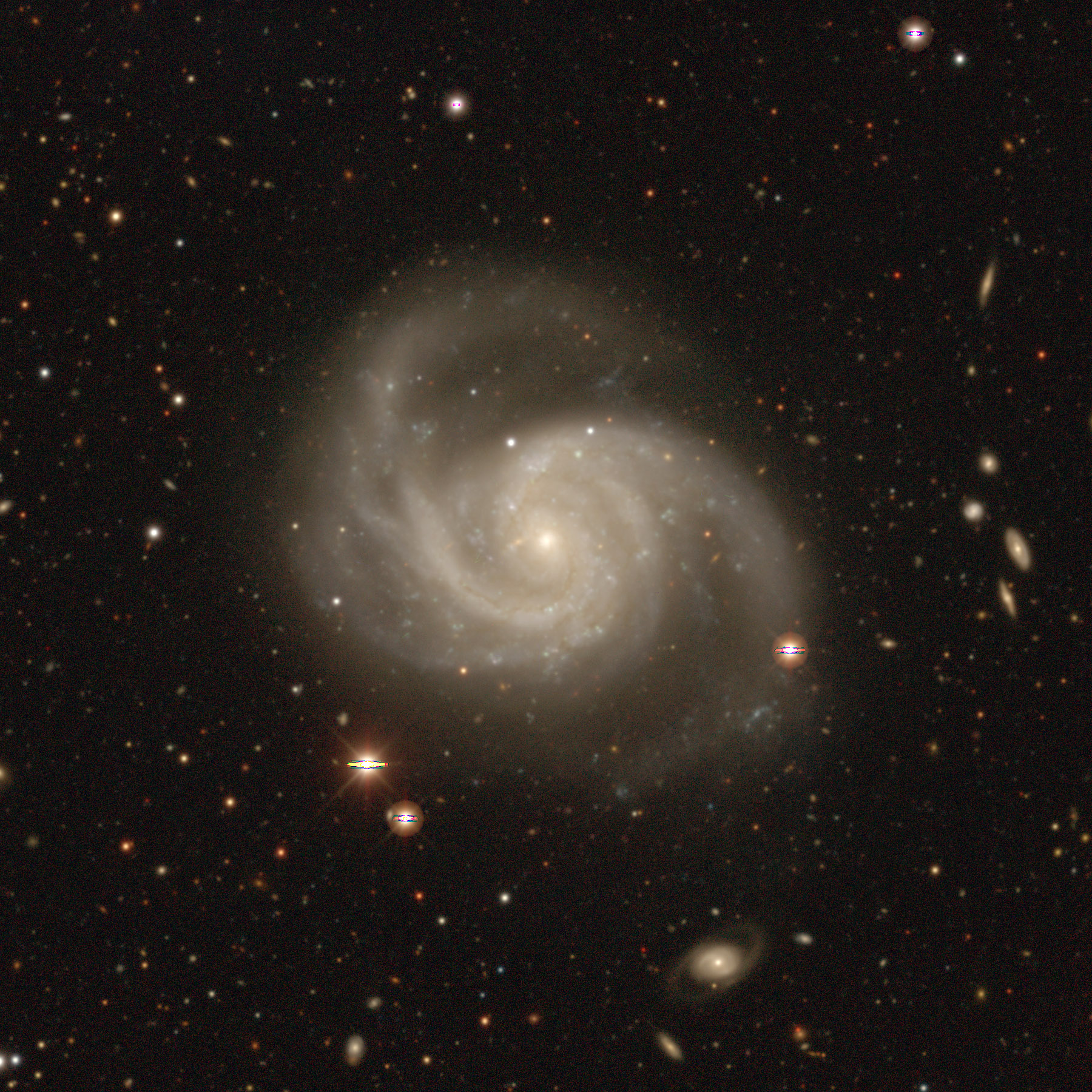
- NGC 7412 by Legacy Surveys

Observation data (J2000 epoch)
- Constellation: Grus
- Right ascension: 22^{h} 55^{m} 45.8108^{s}
- Declination: −42° 38′ 30.718″
- Redshift: 0.005704 ± 0.000013
- Heliocentric radial velocity: 1,710 ± 4 km/s
- Distance: 34.8 ± 15.5 Mly (10.7 ± 4.7 Mpc)
- Apparent magnitude (V): 11.1

Characteristics
- Type: SAB(s)c
- Size: ~57,200 ly (17.54 kpc) (estimated)
- Apparent size (V): 3.9′ × 2.9′

Other designations
- ESO 290- G 024, 2252-425, IRAS 22529-4254, MCG -07-47-004, PGC 70027

NGC 7412 is a spiral galaxy in the constellation Grus. The galaxy lies about 35 million light years away from Earth based on redshift independent methods, which means, given its apparent dimensions, that NGC 7412 is approximately 40,000 light years across. However, based on redshift the galaxy lies about 80 million light years away. It was discovered by John Herschel on September 2, 1836.

NGC 7412 is characterised as an intermediate spiral galaxy, meaning it has a weak bar embedded in its bulge. The bulge is small and lies in a smooth inner disk. The galaxy has two well defined arms in a grand design pattern. The inner part of the north arm appears complex. After about 60° of revolution the arm splits in two, with the higher surface brightness branc being more tightly wound. Both branches can be traced for about a quarter of a revolution. The south arm also splits in two, after about 60° of revolution. The inner branch is of higher surface brightness and can be traced for about 150° of revolution while the outer branch fades after about 60°. Star formation regions are visible at the outer branch. A dust lane runs across the brighter parts of each arm. HII regions are visible, but are smaller than 1.5 arcseconds across. The hydrogen disk of the galaxy extends beyond the optical one. The total hydrogen mass is estimated to be 10^{9.46} M_{☉}. The outer regions of the galaxy appear warped, probably due to an interaction with another galaxy. The color of the nucleus indicates it hosts intermediate age stars, without active starburst activity, surrounded by the older stars of the bulge.

NGC 7412 is a member of the IC 5267 Group, also known as LGG 464. Other members of the group include IC 5267, after which the group is named, IC 5267A, and IC 5267B. This group, along with the groups centred around IC 1459 and NGC 7582, form the Grus cloud, a region of elevated galaxy density. The Grus cloud, along with the nearby Pavo-Indus cloud, lies between the Local Supercluster and Pavo–Indus Supercluster.
