= NGC 7599 =

Galaxy in the constellation Grus

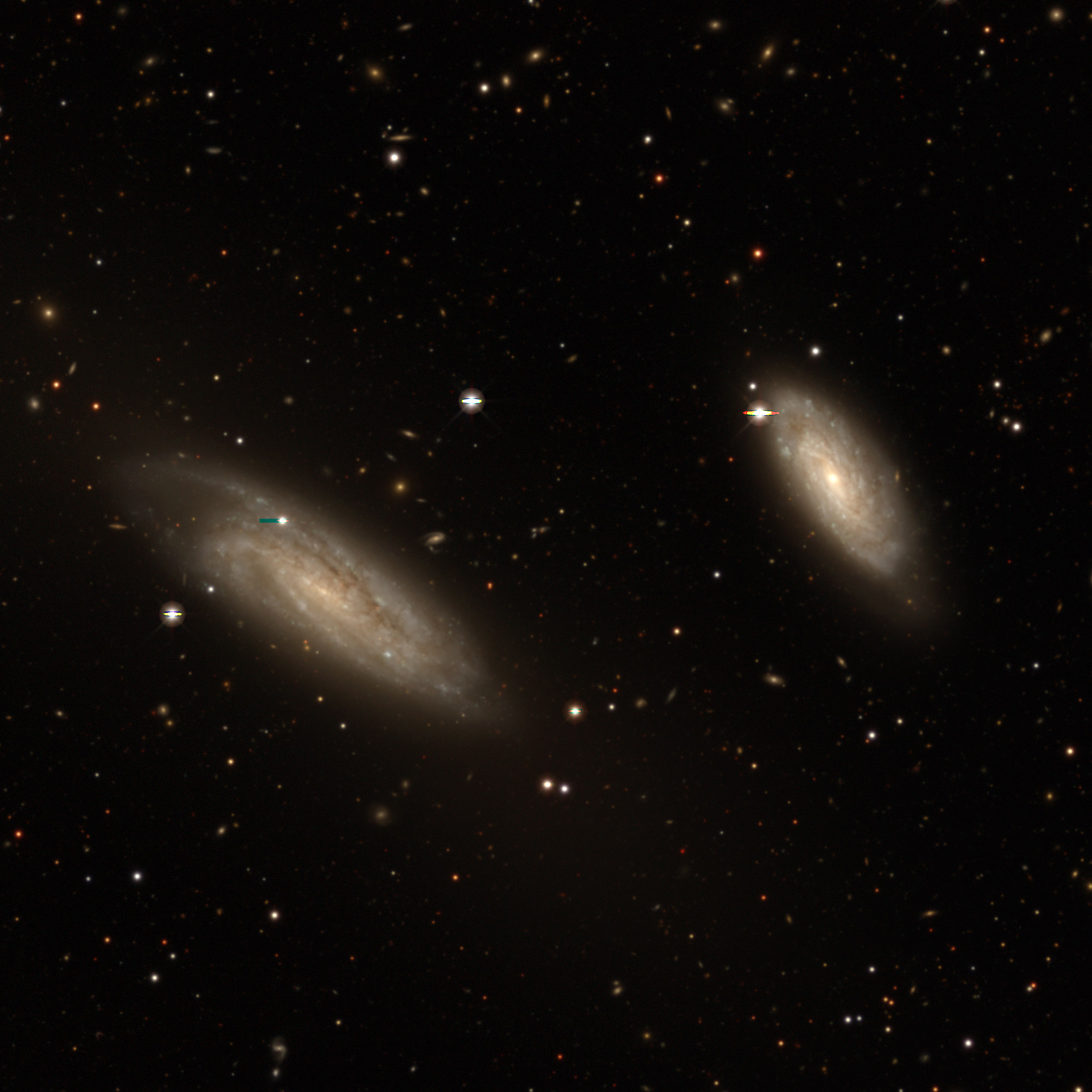
- NGC 7599 (left) and NGC 7590 (right) imaged by Legacy Surveys

Observation data (J2000 epoch)
- Constellation: Grus
- Right ascension: 23^{h} 19^{m} 31.055^{s}
- Declination: −42° 15′ 25.24″
- Redshift: 0.005508 ± 0.000017
- Heliocentric radial velocity: 1,651 ± 5 km/s
- Distance: 62.7 ± 7.4 Mly (19.2 ± 2.3 Mpc)
- Apparent magnitude (V): 11.5

Characteristics
- Type: SB(s)c
- Size: ~94,000 ly (28.9 kpc) (estimated)
- Apparent size (V): 4.4′ × 1.3′

Other designations
- ESO 347- G 034, IRAS 23166-4231, IC 5308, MCG -07-47-033, PGC 71066

NGC 7599 is a barred spiral galaxy in the constellation Grus. The galaxy lies about 65 million light years away from Earth based on redshift independent methods, which means, given its apparent dimensions, that NGC 7599 is approximately 95,000 light years across. It was discovered by James Dunlop on July 14, 1826. It was also discovered by Lewis Swift on 8 August 1897 and thus listed as IC 5308.

NGC 7599 has a very small and not very bright nucleus. The galaxy has multiple spiral arms with knots and branches. A dark lane is visible on one side of the galaxy. The galaxy is a faint source of radiowaves, with the brightest region being west of the outer disk of the galaxy and is associated with the arm that emerges south of the nucleus. The region is also visible in infrared, indicating the presence of dust, and slightly higher ultraviolet emission than its surrounding area. It is possible that this region underwent a star formation event as a result of the interaction between NGC 7599 and nearby galaxy NGC 7590. In the centre of the galaxy lies a supermassive black hole, whose mass is estimated to be 10^{6.48 ± 0.56} (0.8 - 11 millions) M_{☉}, based on the pitch angle of the spiral arms.

NGC 7599 forms a pair with NGC 7590, which lies 4.9 arcminutes away. A hydrogen bridge has been detected between the two galaxies, indicating they are interacting. These two galaxies, along with NGC 7582 and NGC 7552 form the Grus Quartet. In the same galaxy group with the Grus Quartet lie the galaxies NGC 7496, NGC 7531, NGC 7632, and IC 5325. This group, along with the group centred around IC 1459 form the Grus cloud, a region of elevated galaxy density. The Grus cloud, along with the nearby Pavo-Indus cloud, lies between the Local Supercluster and Pavo–Indus Supercluster.
