= Grus Quartet =

Group of galaxies in the constellation Grus

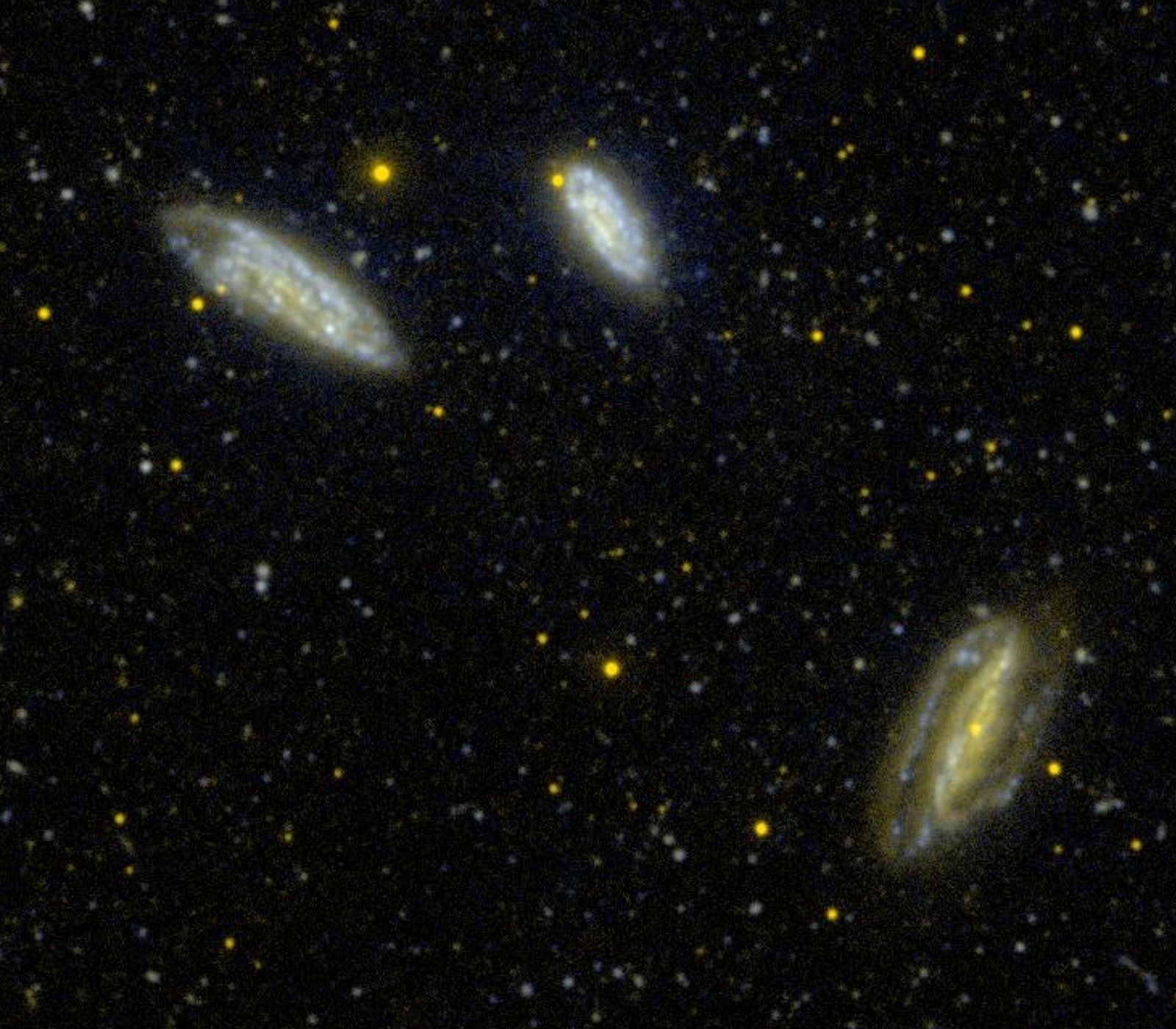
- NGC 7599 (left), NGC 7582 (right), and NGC 7590 (top centre), photographed by GALEX

Observation data (Epoch J2000)
- Constellation: Grus
- Right ascension: 23^{h} 18^{m} 12.2^{s}
- Declination: −42° 21′ 42″
- Brightest member: NGC 7582
- Number of galaxies: 4
- Velocity dispersion: (1571 ± 9) km/s
- Redshift: 0.005240 ± 0.000030
- Distance: 18.2 Mpc (59 Mly)

Other designations
- AM 2315-423

The Grus Quartet is a galaxy cluster in the constellation Grus that includes four interacting spiral galaxies, NGC 7582, NGC 7552, NGC 7590, and NGC 7599. A large tidal extension of H I reaches from NGC 7582 to NGC 7552, which is indicative of interactions between the group members, yet NGC 7552 does not have highly disturbed morphology.

== Location ==
The Grus Quartet can be found to the northeast of Theta Gruis. The latter three galaxies occupy an area of sky only 10 arcminutes across and are sometimes referred to as the "Grus Triplet," although all four are part of a larger loose group of galaxies called the IC 1459 Grus Group.

In the same galaxy group with the Grus Quartet lie the galaxies NGC 7496, NGC 7531, NGC 7632, and IC 5325. This group, along with the group centered around IC 1459 form the Grus Cloud, a region of elevated galaxy density. The Grus Cloud, along with the nearby Pavo–Indus Cloud, lies between the Local Supercluster and Pavo–Indus Supercluster.

== Characteristics of individual galaxies ==
NGC 7552 and NGC 7582 are exhibiting high starburst activity; this is thought to have arisen because of the tidal forces from interacting.

Located on the border of Grus with Piscis Austrinus, the nearby IC 1459 is a peculiar E3 giant elliptical galaxy. It has a fast counterrotating stellar core, and shells and ripples in its outer region. The galaxy has an apparent magnitude of 11.9 and is around 80 million light-years distant.

== Members ==
Galaxies in the Grus Quartet
Name	Type	Distance (Mly)	Apparent magnitude
NGC 7552	(R')SB(s)ab	~61	+10.6
NGC 7582	(R'_1)SB(s)ab	~69	+10.5
NGC 7590	S(r?)bc	~69	+11.3
NGC 7599	S(r?)bc	~63	+11.5

== See also ==
- Telescopium−Grus Cloud
