= NGC 1672 =

Galaxy in the constellation Dorado

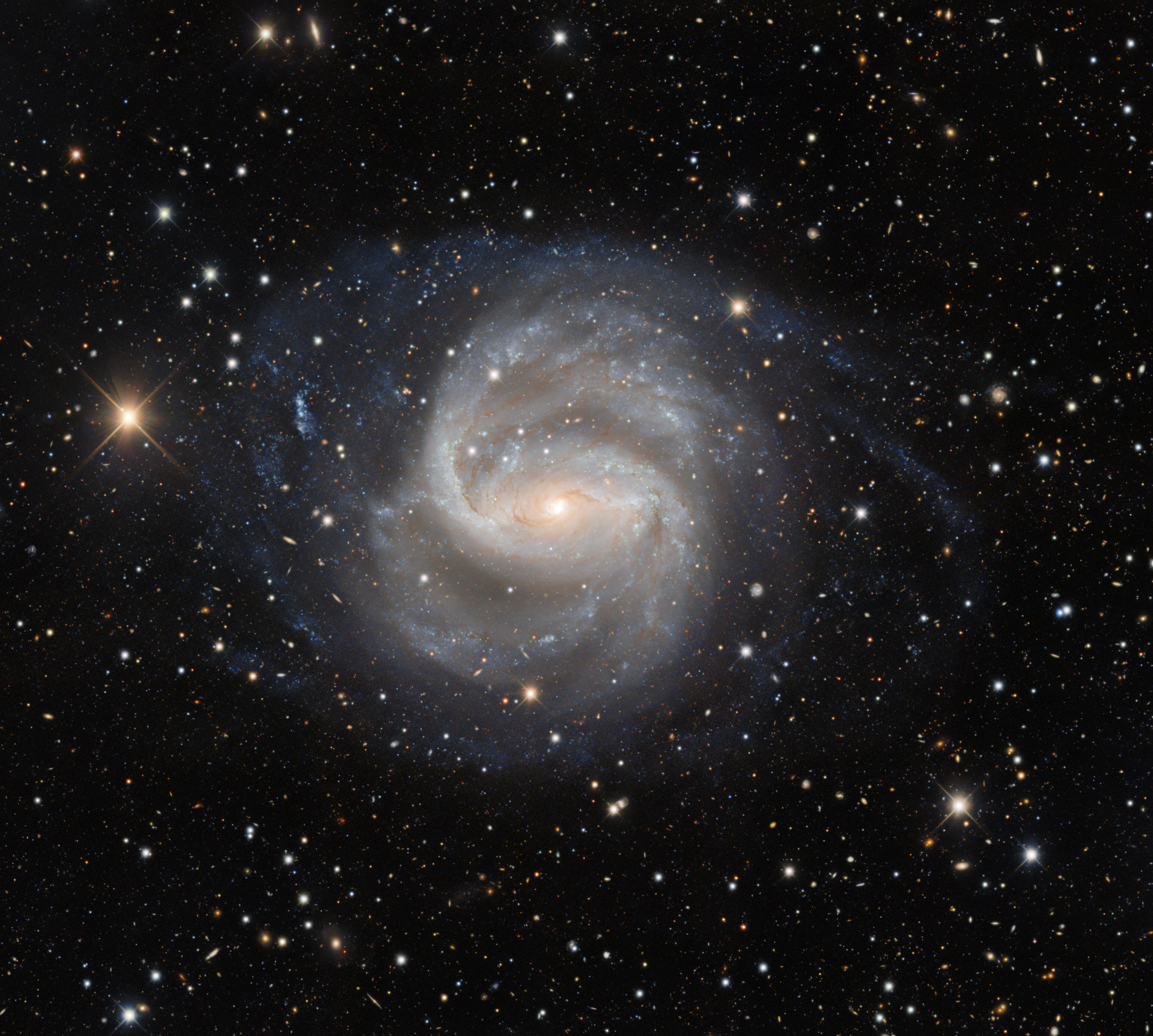
- NGC 1672 imaged by the Víctor M. Blanco Telescope

Observation data (J2000 epoch)
- Constellation: Dorado
- Right ascension: 04^{h} 45^{m} 42.5022^{s}
- Declination: −59° 14′ 50.162″
- Redshift: 0.004440
- Heliocentric radial velocity: 1,331±3 km/s
- Distance: 51.7 ± 3.0 Mly (15.86 ± 0.92 Mpc)
- Apparent magnitude (V): 10.3
- Magnitude (J): 7.897
- Magnitude (H): 7.341
- Magnitude (K): 7.020

Characteristics
- Type: (R')SB(r)bc
- Size: ~100,800 ly (30.91 kpc) (estimated)
- Apparent size (V): 6.6′ × 5.5′

Other designations
- ESO 118- G 043, IRAS 04449-5920, PGC 15941, VV 826

NGC 1672 is a barred spiral galaxy located in the constellation Dorado. It was discovered by Scottish astronomer James Dunlop on 5 November 1826. It was originally unclear whether it was a member of the Dorado Group, with some sources finding it to be a member and other sources rejecting its membership. However, recent tip of the red-giant branch (TRGB) measurements indicate that NGC 1672 is located at the same distance as other members, suggesting it is indeed a member of the Dorado Group.

NGC 1672 has a large bar which is estimated to measure around 20 kpc. It has very strong radio emissions emanating from its nucleus, bar, and the inner portion of the spiral arm region. The nucleus is Seyfert type II and is engulfed by a starburst region. The strongest polarized emissions come from the northeastern region which is upstream from its dust lanes. Magnetic field lines are at large angles with respect to the bar and turn smoothly to the center.

== General structure ==
The center of the galaxy contains a high surface brightness bar, and four filament-like spiral arms extend outward from the ends of this bar. The spiral arms are asymmetric; one of the arms in the northeast part of the disk is significantly brighter than its counterpart on the other side. The spiral arms also contain numerous star formation regions, some of which may be as large as 4″.

== Nucleus ==
The classification of the nucleus of NGC 1672 is uncertain. Most galaxies may be classified by their spectra as having one of three different types of nuclei:

- A nuclear H II region, a region which has a spectrum similar to that of star formation regions in the Milky Way and which therefore is associated with nuclear star formation activity.
- A Seyfert nucleus, a type of active galactic nucleus (AGN) that may contain a supermassive black hole.
- A low-ionization nuclear emission-line region, a type of nuclear region with spectral line emission from weakly ionized gas that could contain either a star formation region or a supermassive black hole.

NGC 1672, however, is one of several nearby galaxies that does not fit into this classification scheme, as its spectrum appears intermediary between these three classes of objects. It may in fact contain both nuclear star formation regions and an AGN. In some wave bands (such as in ultraviolet light), the star formation regions are the primary source of emission.

== NGC 1672 Group ==
According to A. M. Garcia, NGC 1672 is part of the galaxy group NGC 1672 Group (also known as LGG 119), which contains 7 members and 1 possible members, namely NGC 1688, NGC 1703, ESO 118-34, ESO 158-3, ESO 85-14, ESO 85-30 and ESO 119-16 is the possible member.

== Supernovae ==
Two supernovae have been observed in NGC 1672:

- SN 2017gax (Type Ib/c, mag. 17.0406) was discovered by the Distance Less Than 40 Mpc Survey (DLT40) on 14 August 2017.
- SN 2022aau (Type II, mag. 16.2788) was discovered by DLT40 on 20 January 2022.

== Gallery ==
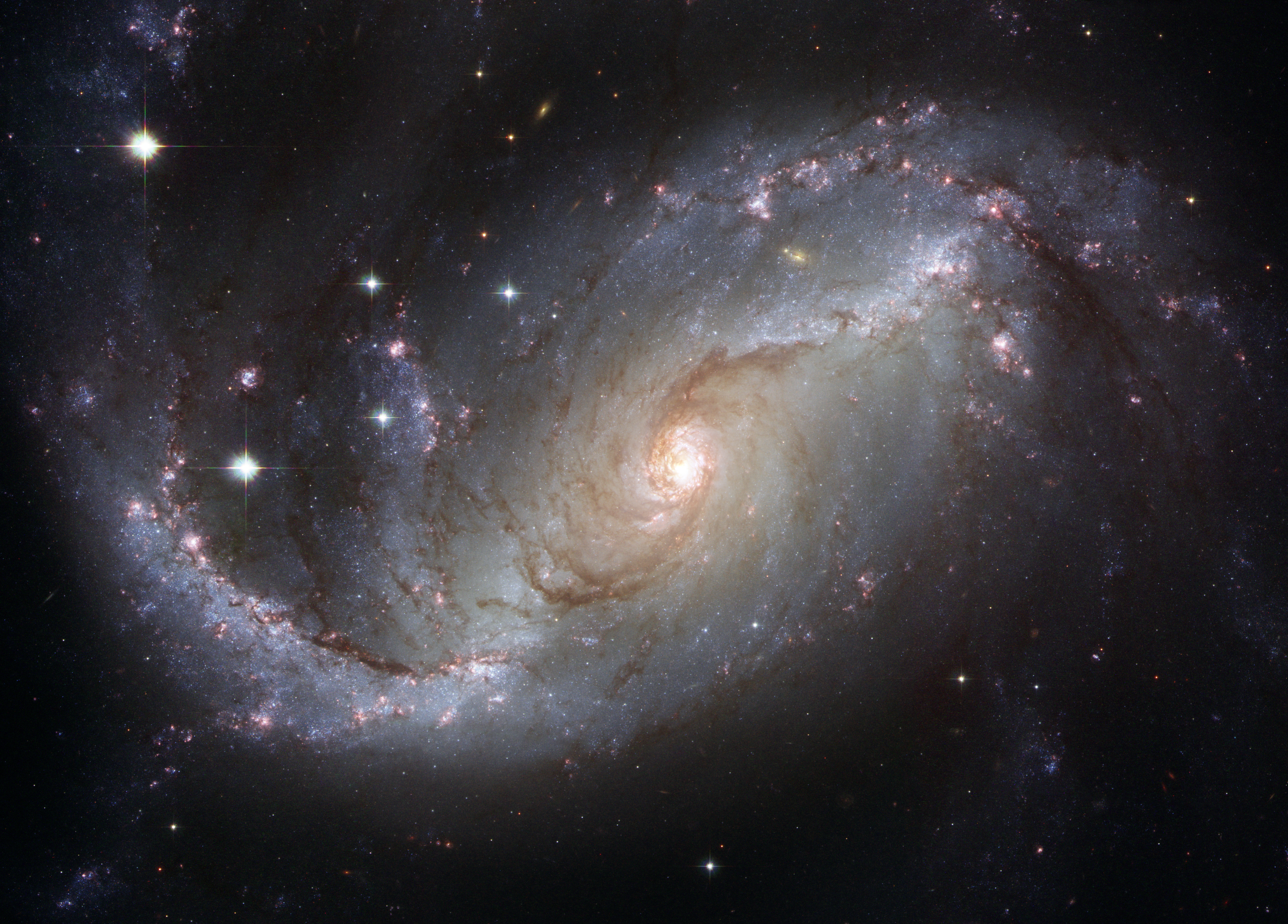
A Hubble Space Telescope image of the center region of NGC 1672

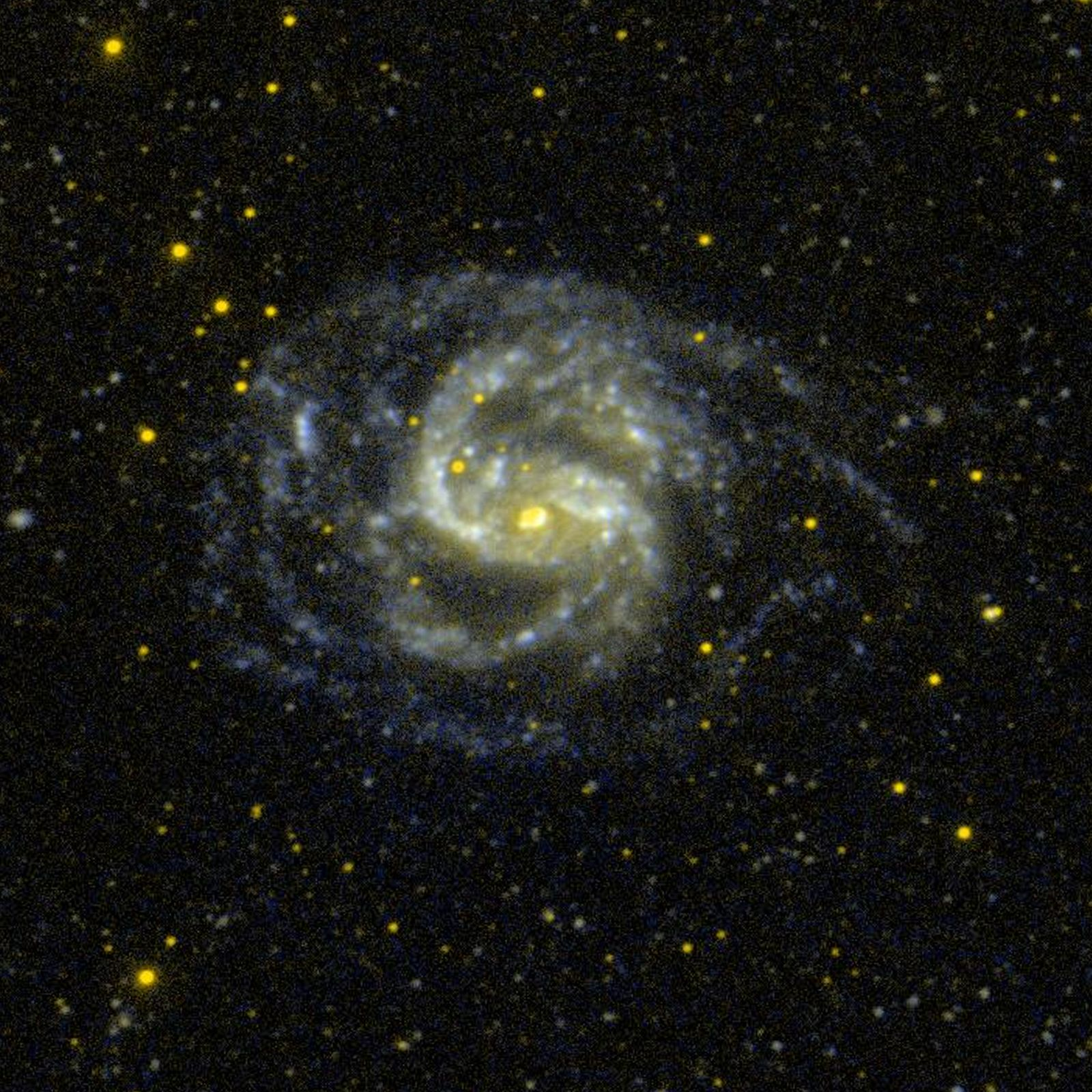
A GALEX ultraviolet image of NGC 1672

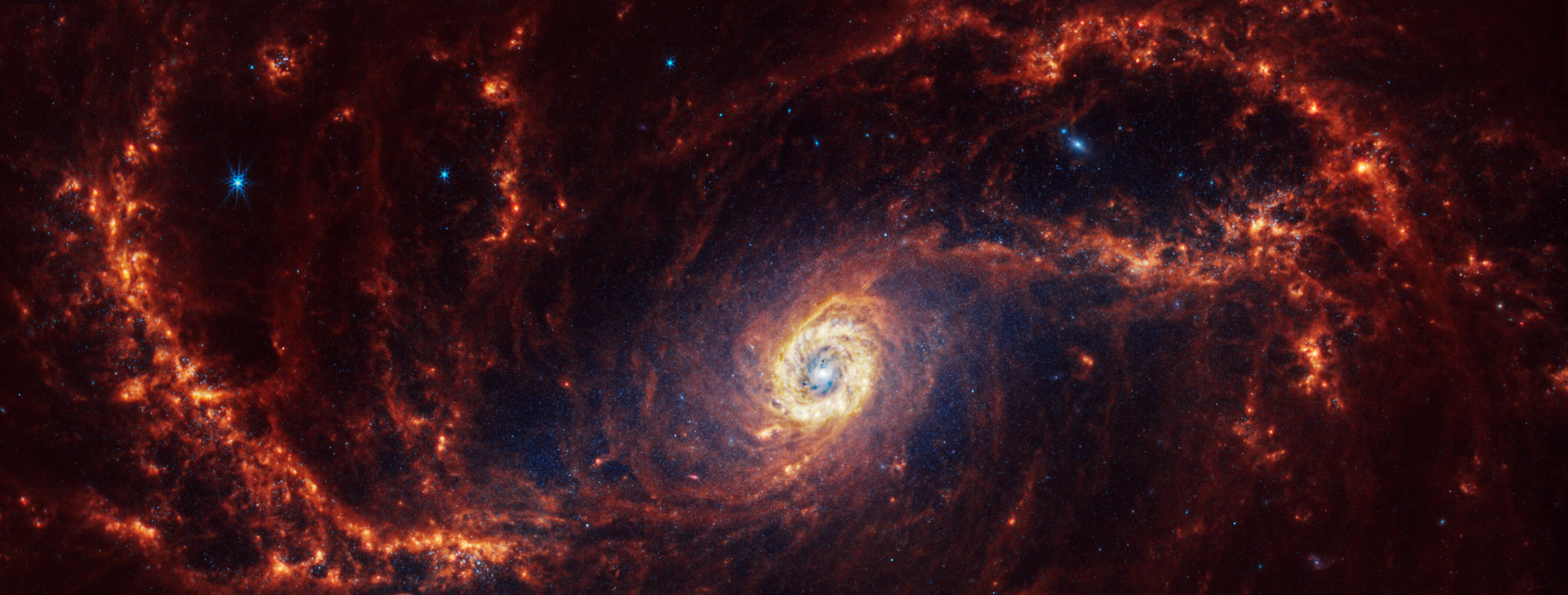
A James Webb Space Telescope image of NGC 1672

== See also ==
- NGC 1300 - A barred spiral galaxy.
- NGC 7552 - A very similar-looking barred spiral galaxy.
- List of NGC objects (1001–2000)
