= NGC 1703 =

Galaxy in the constellation Dorado

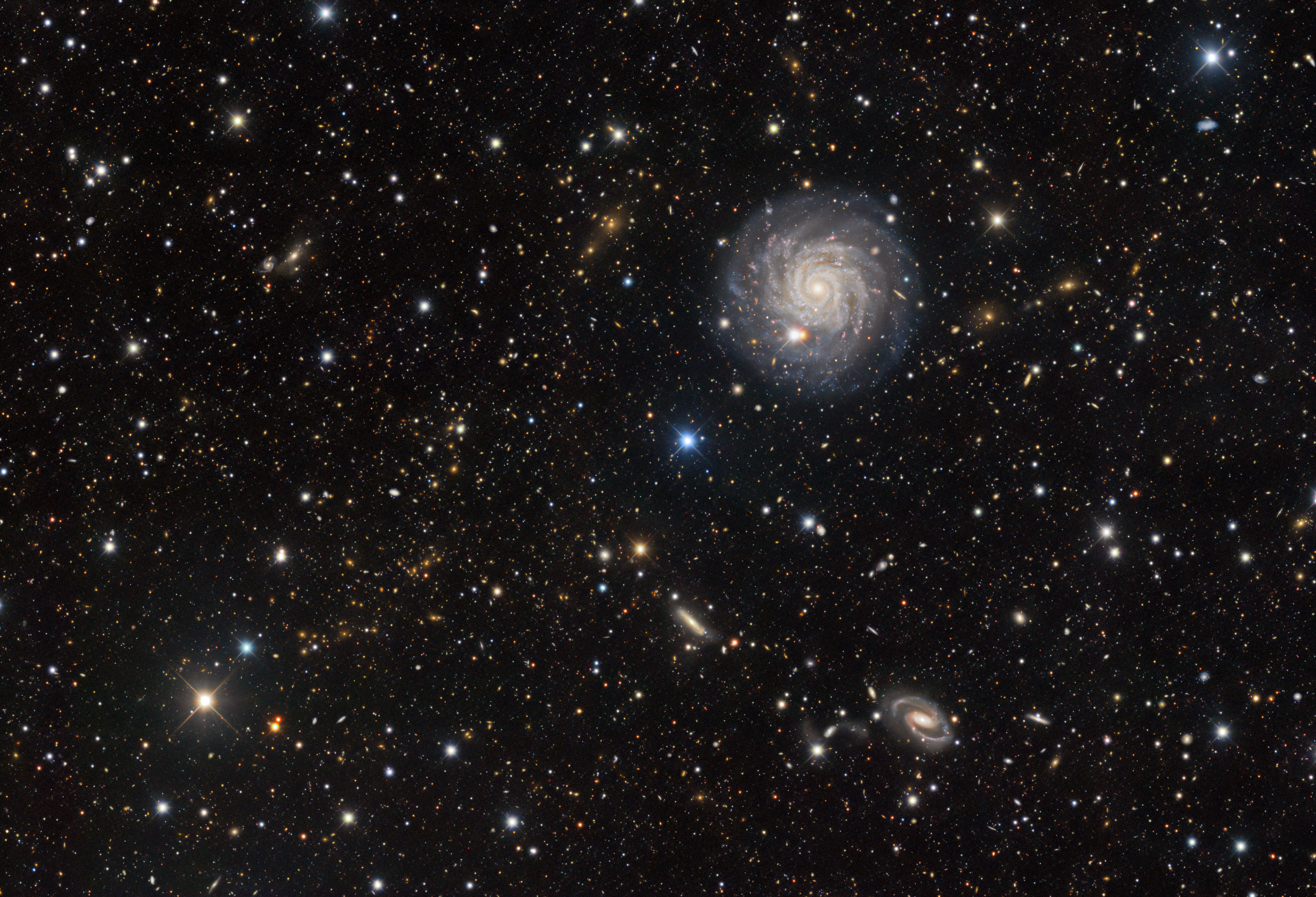
- NGC 1703 by the Víctor M. Blanco Telescope at Cerro Tololo Inter-American Observatory

Observation data (J2000 epoch)
- Constellation: Dorado
- Right ascension: 04^{h} 52^{m} 52.2^{s}
- Declination: −59° 44′ 32″
- Redshift: 0.005090 ± 0.000010
- Heliocentric radial velocity: 1,526 ± 3 km/s
- Distance: 63.6 ± 4.6 Mly (19.5 ± 1.4 Mpc)
- Group or cluster: Dorado Group
- Apparent magnitude (V): 11.2

Characteristics
- Type: SA(s)c
- Apparent size (V): 3.0′ × 2.6′

Other designations
- ESO 119-19, AM 0452-594, IRAS 04521-5949, PGC 16234

NGC 1703 is a spiral galaxy in the constellation Dorado. The galaxy lies about 60 million light years away from Earth, which means, given its apparent dimensions, that NGC 1703 is approximately 50,000 light years across. It was discovered by John Herschel on December 4, 1834.

The galaxy is characterised as SA(s)c meaning that it doesn't have a bar, however there may be a weak bar present. There is no box-shaped bulge detected, a feature commonly associated with barred galaxies. The galaxy is seen nearly face-on, at an inclination of about 27°. It has a small nucleus and two well-defined spiral arms in a grand design pattern. The arms are smooth for about half a revolution but their outer regions are patchy. One arm can be traced for about a full revolution while the other fades after about three quarters of a revolution. In the centre of the galaxy lies a supermassive black hole, whose mass is estimated to be 10^{7.01 ± 0.40} (4 - 26 million) M_{☉}, based on the pitch angle of the spiral arms. The star formation rate based on the HI amount is estimated to be about 1.1 solar mass per year.

NGC 1703 is located in the vicinity of the Dorado Group, lying in the same galaxy cloud as the rest of the members. Garcia considers the galaxy a member of the LGG 119 group, which also includes NGC 1672 and NGC 1688.
