= NGC 7418 =

Galaxy in the constellation Grus

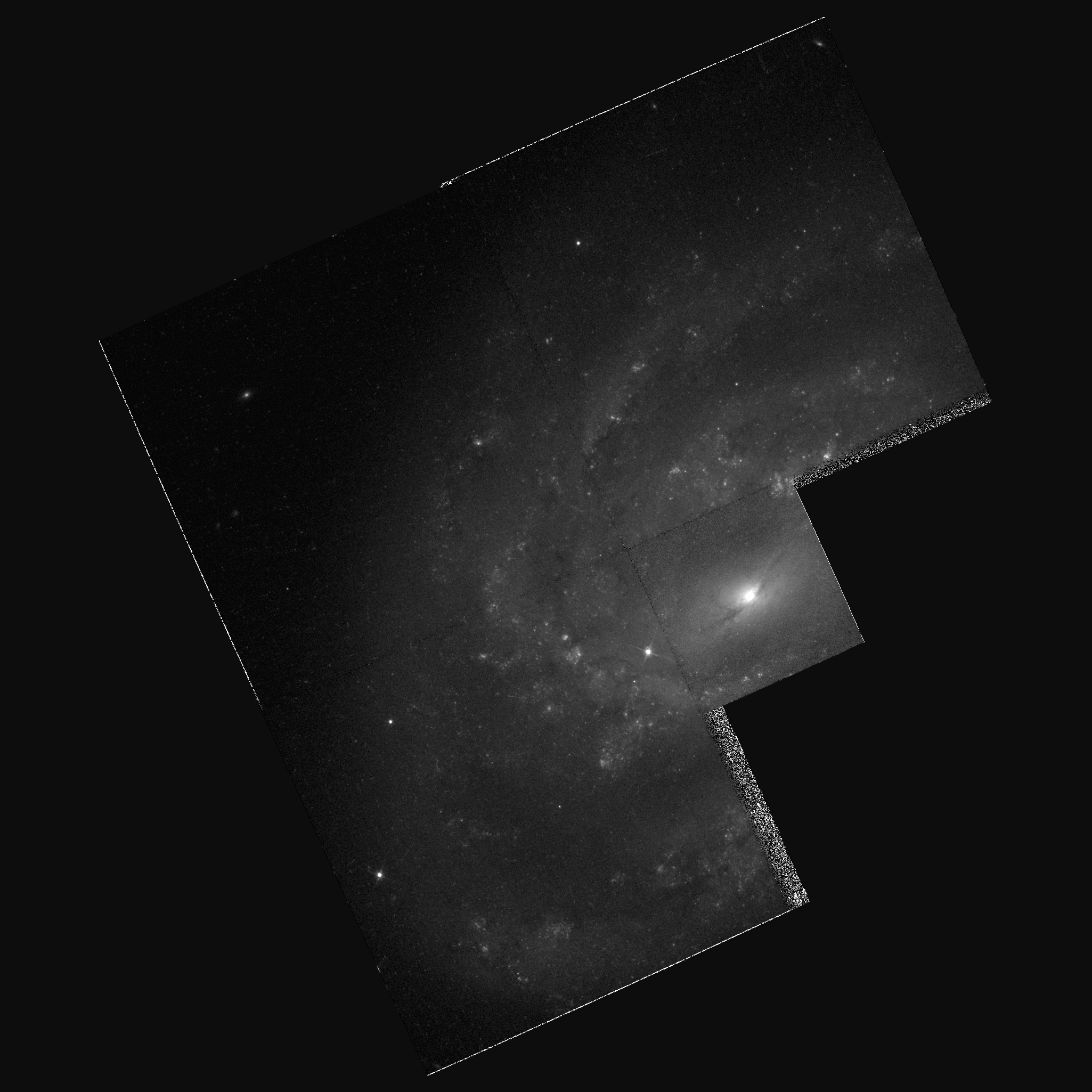
- NGC 7418 by Hubble Space Telescope

Observation data (J2000 epoch)
- Constellation: Grus
- Right ascension: 22^{h} 56^{m} 36.2^{s}
- Declination: −37° 01′ 48.3″
- Redshift: 0.004837 ± 0.000017
- Heliocentric radial velocity: 1,450 ± 5 km/s
- Distance: 59.1 ± 8.5 Mly (18.2 ± 2.6 Mpc)
- Apparent magnitude (V): 11.0

Characteristics
- Type: SAB(rs)cd
- Apparent size (V): 3.5′ × 2.6′

Other designations
- ESO 406- G025, MCG -06-50-013, PGC 70069

NGC 7418 is an intermediate spiral galaxy located in the constellation Grus. It is located at a distance of circa 60 million light-years from Earth, which, given its apparent dimensions, means that NGC 7418 is about 60,000 light-years across. It was discovered by John Herschel on August 30, 1834.

== Characteristics ==
NGC 7418 has a bright nucleus incorporated into a bar. The bar appears strong in the infrared H-band while in the optical wavelengths it appears weaker or even unbarred. The spiral arms of the galaxy emanate from the end of the bar. The galaxy has four grand design spiral arms. Their inner parts have knots while the outermost are smooth. The galaxy is seen with an inclination of 42 degrees.

In the centre of NGC 7418 is believed to lie a supermassive black hole with an estimated mass between 1 and 15 million (10^{6.58 ± 0.59)} M_{☉}, based on the spiral pitch angle. The centre of the galaxy has also been found to host a massive stellar cluster, with an estimated mass of nearly 60 million (10^{7.78 ± 0.19}) M_{☉}. The existence of this nuclear star cluster doesn't rule out the existence of a supermassive black hole. Galaxies like the Milky Way and the Andromeda Galaxy have been found to host both. The stellar population at the nucleus of NGC 7418 has been found to be quite young, with mean age less than 100 million years, indicating recent star forming activity.

== Supernova ==
One supernova has been observed in NGC 7418.

- SN 1983 Z (type unknown, mag. 15.5) was discovered by Luis Eduardo González (astronomer) on September 3, 1983, at Cerro El Roble. The supernova was 11" west and 52" south of the nucleus of the galaxy.

== Nearby galaxies ==
NGC 7418 is a member of a galaxy group known as the IC 1459 group. It is a loose group centred at IC 1459 and contains a large number of spiral galaxies. Other members include NGC 7418A, NGC 7421, IC 5264, IC 5269, IC 5269B, IC 5270, and IC 5273. NGC 7421 lies 19.5 arcminutes away and NGC 7418A lies 16.5 arcminutes to the north as seen in the sky. This group, along with the NGC 7582 group, form the Grus cloud, a region of elevated galaxy density. The Grus cloud, along with the nearby Pavo-Indus cloud, lies between the Local Supercluster and Pavo–Indus Supercluster.

The group features both diffuse X-ray emission from the intergalactic medium and HI emission. Based on the presence of both, it has been suggested that the group is in its early stages of assembling from different subgroups. Three HI clouds have been found to be associated with the group, two located near IC 5270 and one near NGC 7418, at its northwest edge, with total mass 6×10^{8} M_{☉}. These HI clouds are believed to have formed from gas stripped from the galaxies as a result of interactions.

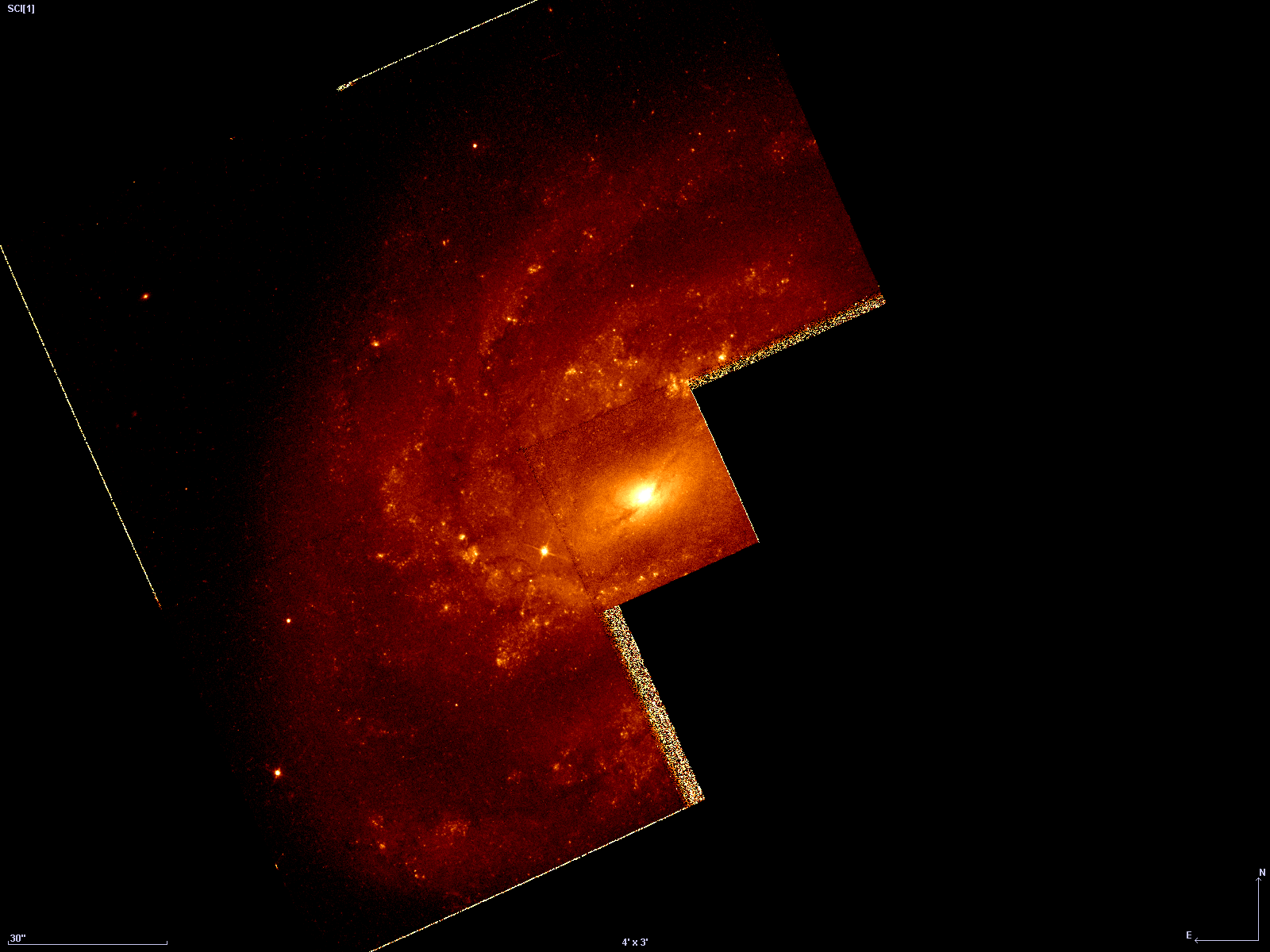
NGC 7418 (HST - Aladin software)
