= NGC 7590 =

Galaxy in the constellation Grus

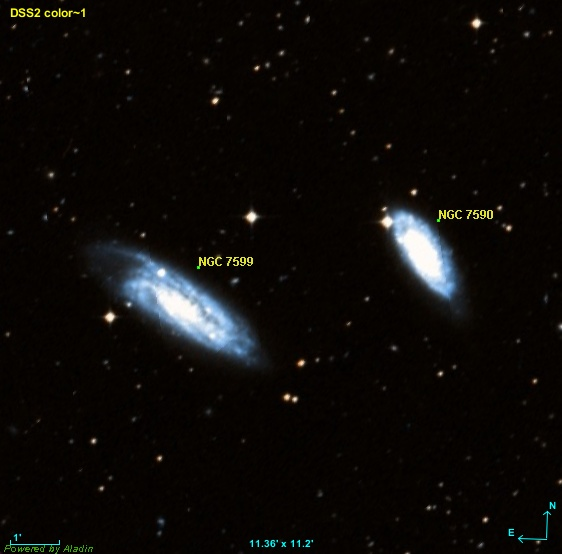
- NGC 7590 is on the right

Observation data (J2000 epoch)
- Constellation: Grus
- Right ascension: 23^{h} 18^{m} 54.827^{s}.
- Declination: −42° 14′ 20.574″
- Redshift: 0.005255
- Heliocentric radial velocity: 1575 ± 5 km/s
- Distance: 84.5 ± 3.986 Mly (25.908 ± 1.222 Mpc)
- Group or cluster: Grus Quartet
- Apparent magnitude (V): 11.37

Characteristics
- Type: SA(rs)bc?
- Size: ~83,700 ly (25.65 kpc) (estimated)
- Apparent size (V): 5.0′ × 2.1′

Other designations
- ESO 347- G 033, IRAS 23161-4230, 2MASX J23185483-4214206, MCG -07-47-030, PGC 71031

NGC 7590 is a spiral galaxy in the constellation Grus. This galaxy is in the upper middle west part of the Virgo Supercluster. Its velocity with respect to the cosmic microwave background is 1333 ± 18 km/s, which corresponds to a Hubble distance of 64.1 ± 4.6 Mly (19.66 ± 1.40 Mpc). However, 12 non-redshift measurements give a distance of 84.50 ± 3.99 Mly (25.908 ± 1.222 Mpc). NGC 7590 was discovered by Scottish astronomer James Dunlop on 14 July 1826.

The SIMBAD database lists NGC 7590 as a Seyfert I Galaxy, i.e. it has a quasar-like nucleus with very high surface brightnesses whose spectra reveal strong, high-ionisation emission lines, but unlike quasars, the host galaxy is clearly detectable. While the neighboring NGC 7599 is marginally brighter, NGC 7590 is easier to identify due to its bright Seyfert core and an adjacent star of 13th magnitude.

== Galaxy groups ==
According to A. M. Garcia (1993), NGC 7590 is a member of the NGC 7582 group (also known as LGG 472). This group of galaxies contains at least 9 members. The other galaxies are NGC 7496, NGC 7531, NGC 7552, NGC 7582, NGC 7599, NGC 7632, IC 5325, and ESO 291-24.

NGC 7590 also belongs to a group known as the Grus Quartet. Other members of the group include the spiral galaxies NGC 7552, NGC 7582, and NGC 7599. A large tidal extension of HI reaches from NGC 7582 to NGC 7552, which is indicative of interactions between the group members, yet NGC 7552 does not have highly disturbed morphology.

== See also ==
- List of NGC objects (7001–7840)

== Sources ==
- O'Meara, S.J. (2013). Deep-Sky Companions: Southern Gems. Cambridge University Press. ISBN 978-1-107-01501-2.
