= NGC 7421 =

Spiral galaxy in the constellation Grus

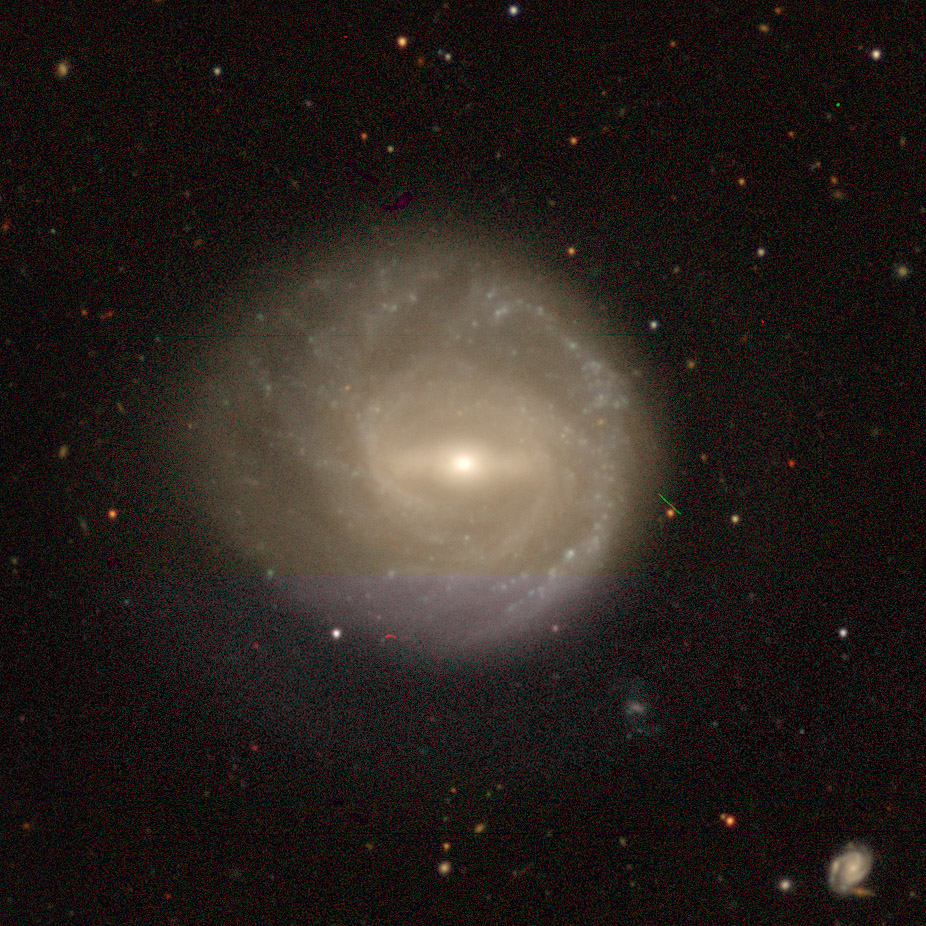
- Legacy Surveys DR10 image of NGC 7421

Observation data (J2000 epoch)
- Constellation: Grus
- Right ascension: 22^{h} 56^{m} 54.353^{s}
- Declination: −37° 20′ 50.44″
- Distance: 81.6 Mly (25.01 Mpc)
- Apparent magnitude (V): 12.0

Characteristics
- Type: SB(rs)bc
- Mass: 20.9×10^{9} M_{☉}
- Apparent size (V): 2.2′

Other designations
- NGC 7421, LEDA 70083, MCG -06-50-015

NGC 7421 is a barred spiral galaxy in the southern constellation of Grus. It was discovered by English astronomer John Herschel on August 30, 1834. In Danish astronomer J. L. E. Dreyer's New General Catalogue of Nebulae and Clusters of Stars it was described as: considerably bright, large, very little extended, gradually pretty much brighter middle, and partially resolved. NGC 7421 is located at an estimated distance of 81.6 million light-years (25.01 Mpc) from the Sun. It is a member of the IC 1459 galaxy group.

In the Third Reference Catalogue of Bright Galaxies, NGC 7421 was assigned a morphological classification of SB(rs)bc, which indicates a barred spiral galaxy (SB) with a transitional ring structure (rs) and moderately wound spiral arms (bc). The galactic plane is inclined at an angle of 36.2° to the plane of the sky, with the major axis aligned along a position angle of 80.6°. It displays an asymmetric morphology, which shows up in a lopsided optical appearance and in the distribution of CO and neutral hydrogen atoms. New stars are forming at a rate of 0.274±0.041 M_{☉}·yr^{−1}. The gas fraction and star formation rate is significantly lower than normal, suggesting an interaction with the external environment.

The western boundary of this galaxy resembles a bow shock that suggests an interaction with the intracluster medium. Radio mapping of neutral hydrogen by the ATCA displays an extended wake to the north and south of the galaxy, supporting this hypothesis. A past tidal interaction may be needed to explain the asymmetry of this galaxy. A candidate galaxy is NGC 7418, which is located at an angular separation of ~20′. However, there are no tidal tails visible from such an encounter. The total mass of the neutral hydrogen in this galaxy is 1.5×10^{9} M_{☉}.

== Supernova ==
Two supernovae have been observed in NGC 7421:

- AT 2018bbl (Type II, mag. 17.4) was discovered by the Backyard Observatory Supernova Search (BOSS) on 24 April 2018.
- SN 2023abdg (Type II, mag. 14.753) was discovered by ATLAS on December 12, 2023.

== See also ==
- NGC 4654, a galaxy in Virgo with a similar appearance
