= NGC 7552 =

Galaxy in the constellation Grus

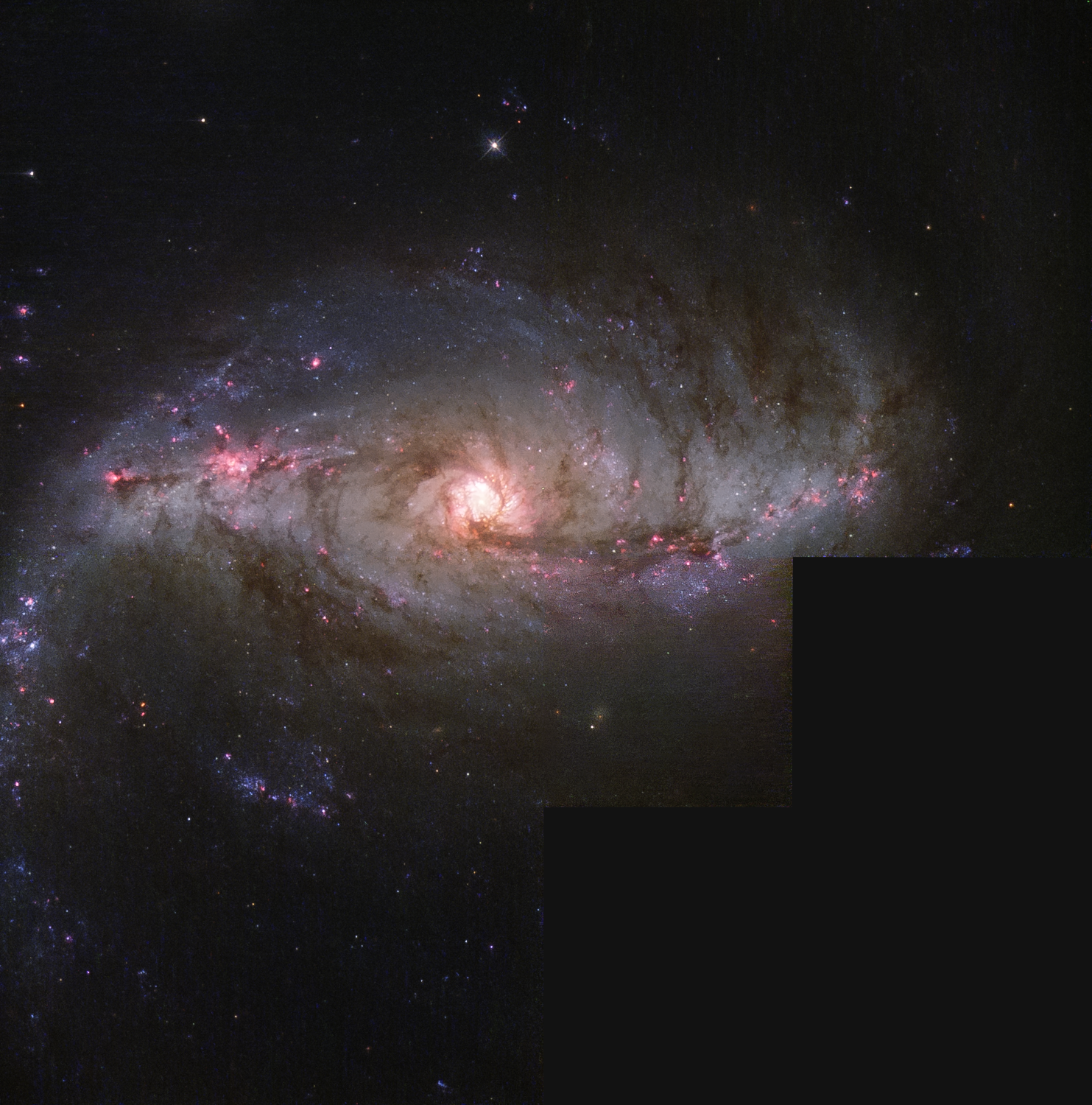
- NGC 7552 imaged by the Hubble Space Telescope

Observation data (J2000 epoch)
- Constellation: Grus
- Right ascension: 23^{h} 16^{m} 10.7287^{s}
- Declination: −42° 35′ 04.881″
- Heliocentric radial velocity: 1608 ± 5 km/s
- Distance: 56 Mly (17.2 Mpc)
- Apparent magnitude (V): 11.2

Characteristics
- Type: (R')SB(s)ab
- Size: ~55,700 ly (17.07 kpc) (estimated)
- Apparent size (V): 3.4′ × 2.7′

Other designations
- ESO 291- G 012, IRAS 23134-4251, IC 5294, MCG -07-47-028, PGC 70884, VV 440

NGC 7552 (also known as IC 5294) is a barred spiral galaxy in the constellation Grus. It is at a distance of roughly 60 million light years from Earth, which, given its apparent dimensions, means that NGC 7552 is about 75,000 light years across. It forms with three other spiral galaxies the Grus Quartet.

== Observation history ==
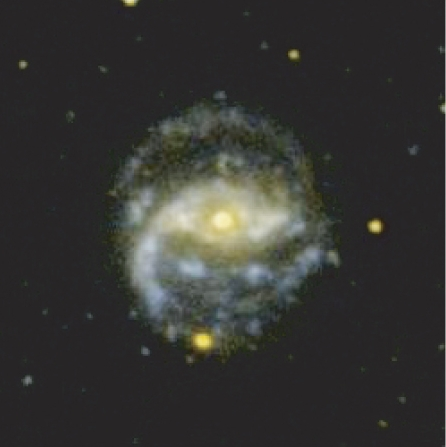
Image of NGC 7552 taken by the GALEX ultraviolet telescope.

NGC 7552 was discovered on 7 July 1826 by James Dunlop. John Herschel added it to the General Catalogue of Nebulae and Clusters as number 3977. However, Lewis Swift reported the galaxy independently on 22 October 1897, at right ascention 9 arcseconds off the location of the galaxy and it was included in Index Catalogue as IC 5294.

== Structure ==
NGC 7552 is a barred spiral galaxy, with two spiral arms forming an outer pseudo-ring. The galaxy is seen nearly face on, at an inclination of ~ 28°. The one arm is more prominent and the less prominent arm shows no clear continuation with the bar. The bar is dusty, and four huge HII regions are detected in it. The disk features numerous scattered HII regions in an asymmetric pattern. The total infrared luminosity of the galaxy is 10^{11.03} L_{☉}, and thus is categorised as a luminous infrared galaxy.

The SIMBAD database lists NGC 7552 as a Seyfert I Galaxy, i.e. it has a quasar-like nucleus with very high surface brightnesses whose spectra reveal strong, high-ionisation emission lines, but unlike quasars, the host galaxy is clearly detectable.

=== Starburst ring ===
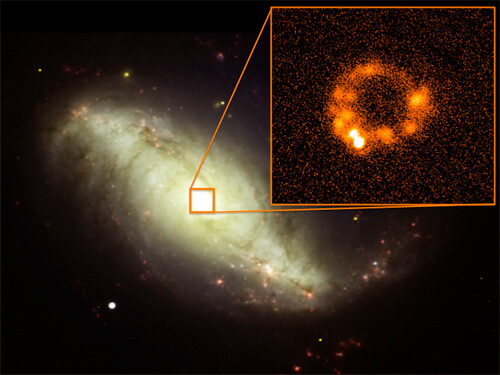
The starburst ring in mid-infrared by the T-ReCS of Gemini Observatory.

In 1994, Forbes et al. observed a partial starburst ring with 1 kpc radius at Br-gamma with various hot spots. They also detected a small-scale molecular bar and a large reservoir of molecular material, however, no evidence of current activity was detected at the nucleus. The ring is more than 100 parsecs wide.

The ring is brighter north of the nucleus and there is inhabited by the younger star populations. Brandl et al. detected in near- and mid-infrared nine prominent structures within the ring they identified as star clusters with stellar ages ranging between 5.5 Myr and 6.3 Myr. These clusters account for the 75% of the bolometric luminosity of the starburst ring, with total luminosity of the clusters 2.1 × 10^{10} L⊙. Numerous supernova remnants have been observed in the ring. Further observations of the galaxy in radio waves showed that NGC 7552 contains three star forming rings of radii 1.0 kpc, 1.9 kpc, and 3.4 kpc as observed by the Very Large Array at 46.9 MHz and the Australia Telescope Compact Array.

== Supernova and Luminous Red Nova ==
One supernova has been observed in NGC 7552: SN 2017bzc (Type Ia, mag. 12.8) was discovered by Stuart Parker as part of the Backyard Observatory Supernova Search (BOSS) on 7 march 2017. In addition, a luminous red nova has also been observed in NGC 7552: AT 2014ej (type LRN, mag. 18.0), also known as NGC7552-2014OT1, was discovered by Peter Marples also as part of BOSS on 24 September 2014.

== Galaxy group ==
NGC 7552 belongs in NGC 7582 group, also known as the Grus group. Other members of the group include the spiral galaxies NGC 7599, NGC 7590, and NGC 7582, which along with NGC 7552 form the Grus Quartet. A large tidal extension of HI reaches from NGC 7582 to NGC 7552, which is indicative of interactions between the group members, yet NGC 7552 does not have highly disturbed morphology.

== See also ==
- NGC 1672 - a similar-looking barred spiral galaxy
- List of NGC objects (7001–7840)
