= NGC 7582 =

Galaxy in the constellation Grus

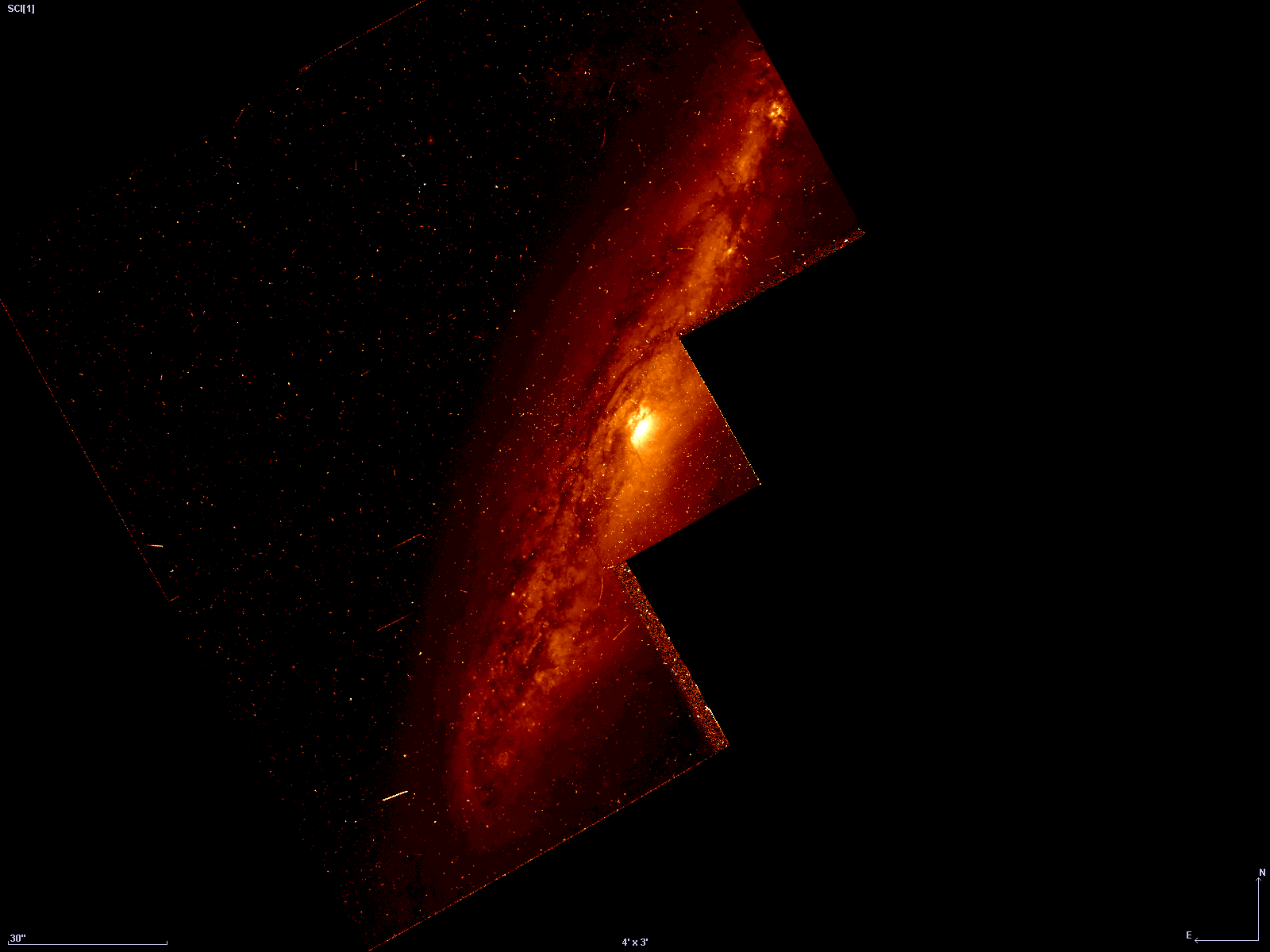
- Hubble Space Telescope image of NGC 7582

Observation data (J2000 epoch)
- Constellation: Grus
- Right ascension: 23^{h} 18^{m} 23.5^{s}
- Declination: −42° 22′ 14″
- Redshift: 0.005254
- Distance: 69.1 ± 6.719 Mly (21.2 ± 2.060 Mpc)
- Apparent magnitude (V): 11.37

Characteristics
- Type: SB(s)ab
- Size: 331,220 ly (101.60 kpc) (estimated)
- Apparent size (V): 5.0' × 2.1'

Other designations
- 2MASX J23182362-4222140, MCG -07-47-029, PGC 071001

NGC 7582 is a barred spiral galaxy located about 70 million light years away from Earth in the constellation of Grus. The galaxy has a diameter of about 330,000 light years. It is classified as a Seyfert 2 galaxy. This galaxy is located in the upper middle west part of the Virgo Supercluster.

The galaxy is a Hubble type SB(s)ab. It has an angular size of 5.0' × 2.1' and an apparent magnitude of 11.37.

NGC 7582 also belongs to a galaxy group known as the Grus Quartet. Other members of the group include the spiral galaxies NGC 7552, NGC 7590, and NGC 7599.

== Characteristics ==
=== Central region ===
==== Nuclear region ====
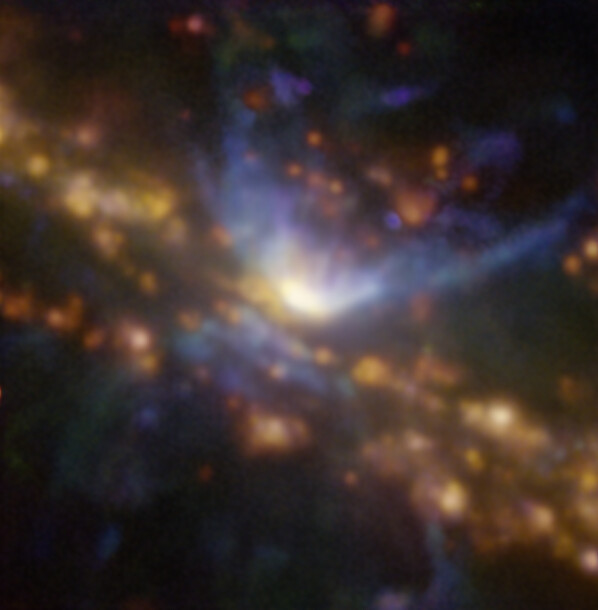
Image showing the biconical ionized outflow of NGC 7582.

The nuclear region of NGC 7582 is complex with an estimated total mass of about 3×10^{−3} M_{☉}. It is highly inclined being at an angle of 58°. The galaxy hosts an active galactic nucleus (AGN) that is driven by biconical ionized outflow. The supermassive black hole at the core has a mass of 5.5+2.6
−1.9×10^{7} M_{☉}.

==== Circumnuclear region ====
Surrounding the nucleus is an circumnuclear star-forming disc with a total mass of around 3×10^{6} M_{☉}. The disc has a radius of approximately 190-200 parsecs with a asymmetric ring located at a distance of around 30-40 parsecs. Bright emission regions are also seen which are caused by star formation which in turn is powered by a ring of molecular gas. The star formation rate in this galaxy is around 0.23-0.28 solar masses a year. This region is young being around 5 million years old. Temperatures of circumnuclear dust is around 1050 Kelvin at distances closer than 25 parsecs from the nucleus.

It seems that the outflow of gas does not originate from the AGN but instead originates from gas in the circumnuclear region. This gas is being pushed away from the galaxy by outflow from the nuclear region.

==== Central bar ====
The central bar of NGC 7582 has a prominent boxy-shaped morphology. The central bar and its box-shaped was discovered in 1997 by Quillen et al. (1997). The study showed that the boxiness of NGC 7582 was prominent even compared to other galaxies with a box-shaped central bar. The bar is dusty and is similar to the central bar of NGC 7552.

== Gallery ==
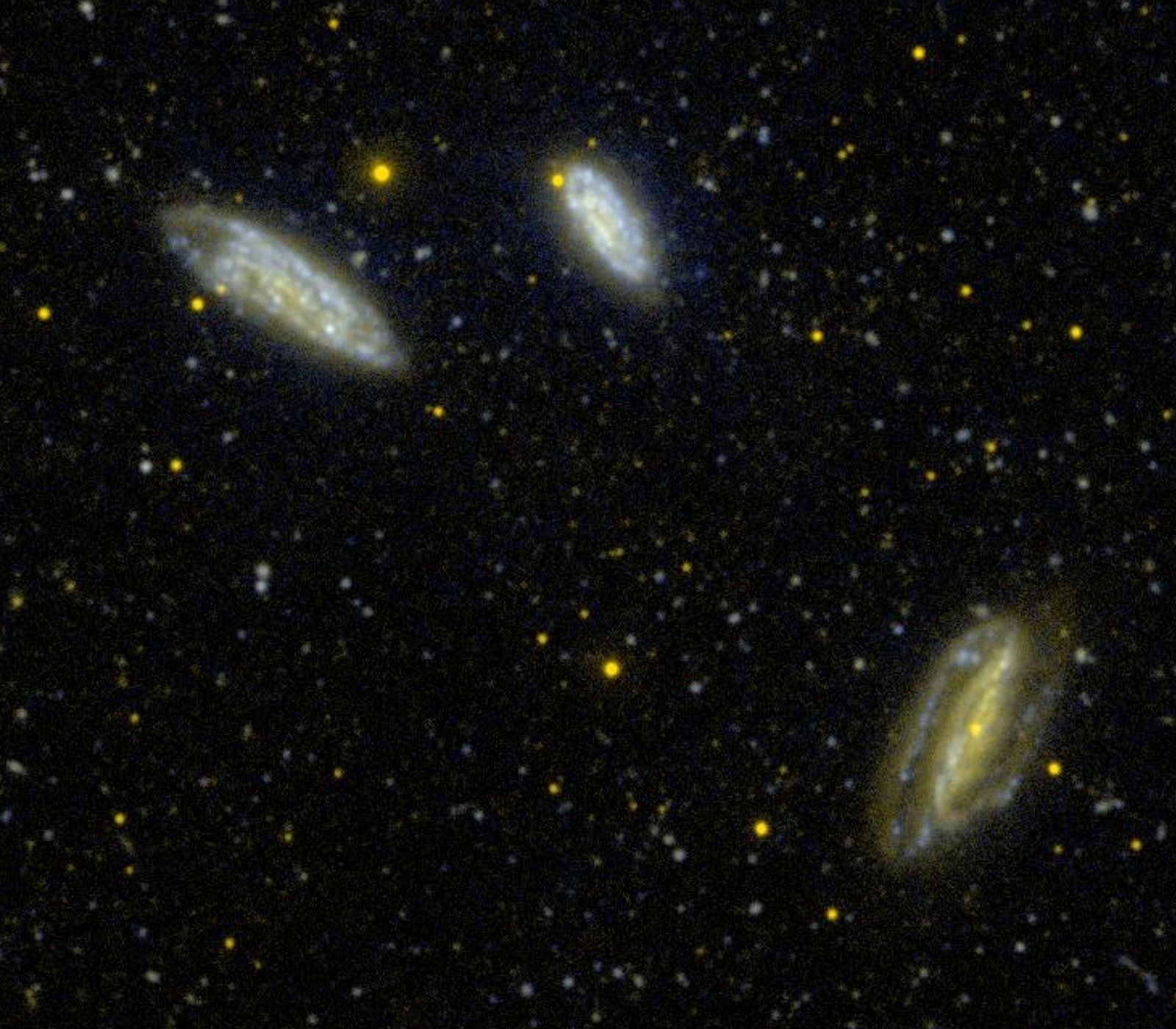
NGC 7582, NGC 7590 (top left), and NGC 7599 (top middle) taken by GALEX.

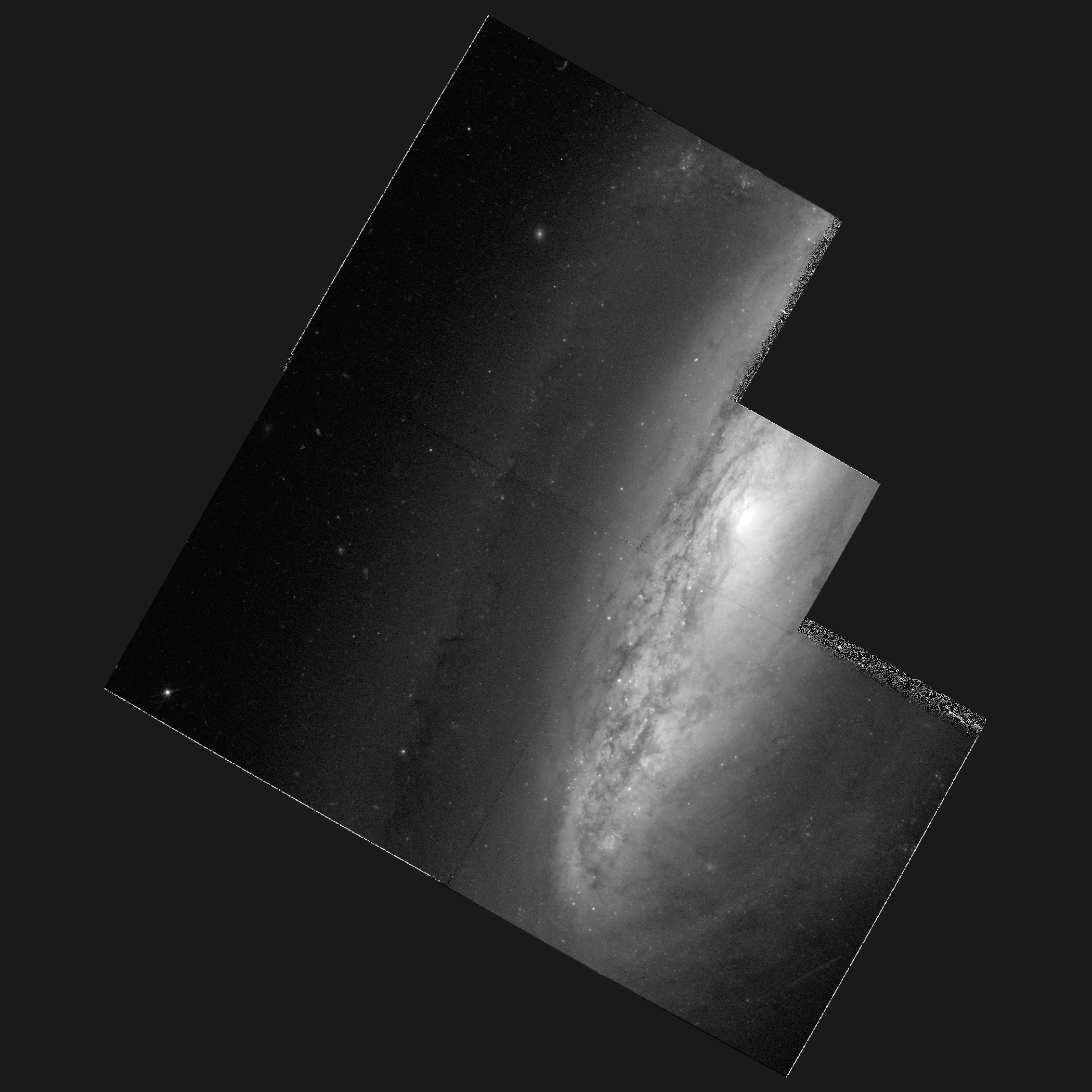
NGC 7582 imaged by the Hubble Space Telescope.
