= IC 1459 =

Elliptical galaxy in the constellation of Grus

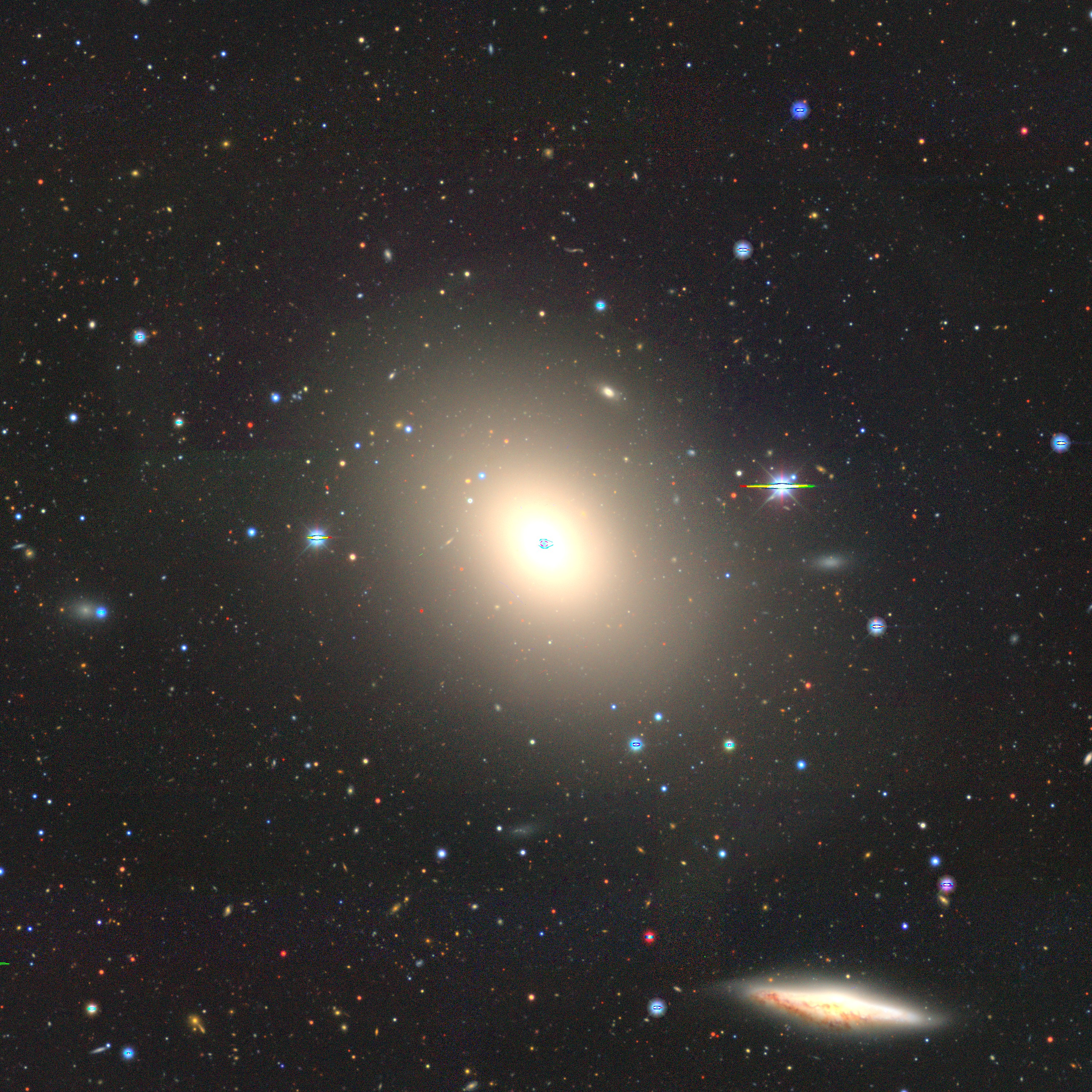
- IC 1459 imaged by Legacy Surveys

Observation data (J2000 epoch)
- Constellation: Grus
- Right ascension: 22^{h} 57^{m} 10.6^{s}
- Declination: −36° 27′ 44″
- Redshift: 0.006011 ± 0.000039
- Heliocentric radial velocity: 1,802 ± 12 km/s
- Distance: 85 ± 27 Mly (26.2 ± 8.5 Mpc)
- Apparent magnitude (V): 10.0

Characteristics
- Type: E3
- Apparent size (V): 5.2′ × 3.8′
- Notable features: Radio galaxy

Other designations
- IC 5265, ESO 406- G030, AM 2254-364, MCG -06-50-016, PKS 2254-367, PGC 070090

IC 1459 (also catalogued as IC 5265) is an elliptical galaxy located in the constellation Grus. It is located at a distance of circa 85 million light-years from Earth, which, given its apparent dimensions, means that IC 1459 is about 130,000 light-years across. It was discovered by Edward Emerson Barnard in 1892.

== Characteristics ==
IC 1459 is a giant elliptical galaxy. In its core has been observed a fast counter-rotating stellar component, with an estimated total mass of 3×10^{9} M_{☉}. The stars of this component have circular orbits on a flat disk with a radius of less than two arcseconds. It has been suggested that the stars of the counterrotating disk are of external origin, either by the accretion of a stellar satellite or of a dense molecular cloud from which the stars were created. The galaxy also features multiple shells and disturbed isophotes, which indicate that it has accreted material, probably by the merger of smaller galaxies with the elliptical galaxy. Enhanced photography revealed the presence of a diffuse spiral pattern at the outer regions of IC 1459.

It has been suggested that a merger started a starburst event in IC 1459. The total duration of this event has not been well constrained, but it is estimated it lasted less than 80 million years. Young stars make up approximately 3% of the total stellar population of the galaxy. They have an average age of 400 million years. Metallicity has been found to decrease as the radial distance from the center increases.

The nucleus of IC 1459 is active and has been characterised as a LINER based on its optical spectrum. The most accepted theory for the power source of active galactic nuclei is the presence of an accretion disk around a supermassive black hole. In the centre of IC 1459 lies a supermassive black hole with an estimated mass (2.6±1.0)×10^{9} M_{☉} based on stellar velocities. Estimates of the mass of the black hole based on gas kinematics are lower, from (1-4) × 10^{8} to 10^{9} M_{☉}, although the presence of non-gravitational forces acting on the circumnuclear gas renders them less accurate. The disturbed kinematics of the circumnuclear gas may be caused by an outflow. In the circumnuclear region there is also dust with irregular distribution, indicating nonequilibrium motions.

The galaxy is characterised as low-power radio loud, with gigahertz-peaked spectrum, and has two symmetrical radio jets. In a 3.5 year observation period, the galaxy showed little variability. The galaxy also has weak X-ray emission. The nucleus appears unabsorbed in lower energy X-ray, with X-ray luminosity 7.9×10^{40} ergs s-1, while the Fe-Kα fluorescence line, is not strong. The infrared emission of the nucleus is also less than the one expected by an AGN hidden by a dust torus. This indicates that the AGN is seen unobstructed. The galaxy possess an X-ray halo, whose modelling indicated the presence of dark matter at a distance larger than 3 effective radii.

In images by the Hubble Space Telescope, 199 globular clusters were recognised, with an indication of a decrease of their number near the core and statistically non-significant evidence of dimodial color distribution.

== Nearby galaxies ==
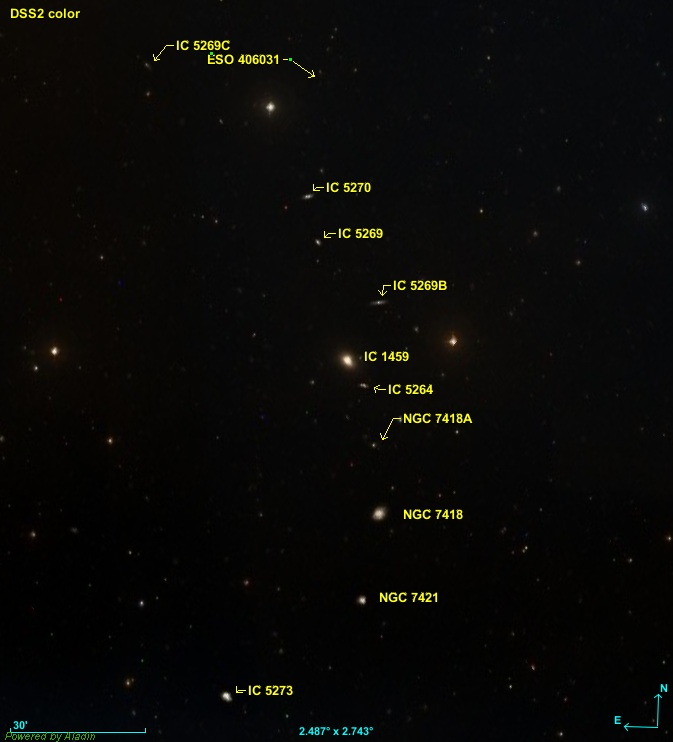
IC 1459 group

IC 1459 is the brightest galaxy in a galaxy group known as the IC 1459 group. It is a loose group centred at IC 1459 with a large number of spiral galaxies. Other members include NGC 7418, NGC 7418A, NGC 7421, IC 5264, IC 5269, IC 5269B, IC 5270, and IC 5273. IC 5264 lies 6.5 arcminutes south of IC 1459. This group, along with the NGC 7582 group form the Grus cloud, a region of elevated galaxy density. The Grus cloud, along with the nearby Pavo-Indus cloud, lies between the Local Supercluster and Pavo–Indus Supercluster.

The group features both diffuse X-ray emission from the intergalactic medium and HI emission. Based on the presence of both it has been suggested that the group is in its early stages of assembling from different subgroups. Three HI clouds have been found to be associated with the group, two located near IC 5270 and one near NGC 7418. These HI clouds are believed to have formed from gas stripped from the galaxies as a result of interactions.

== Gallery ==
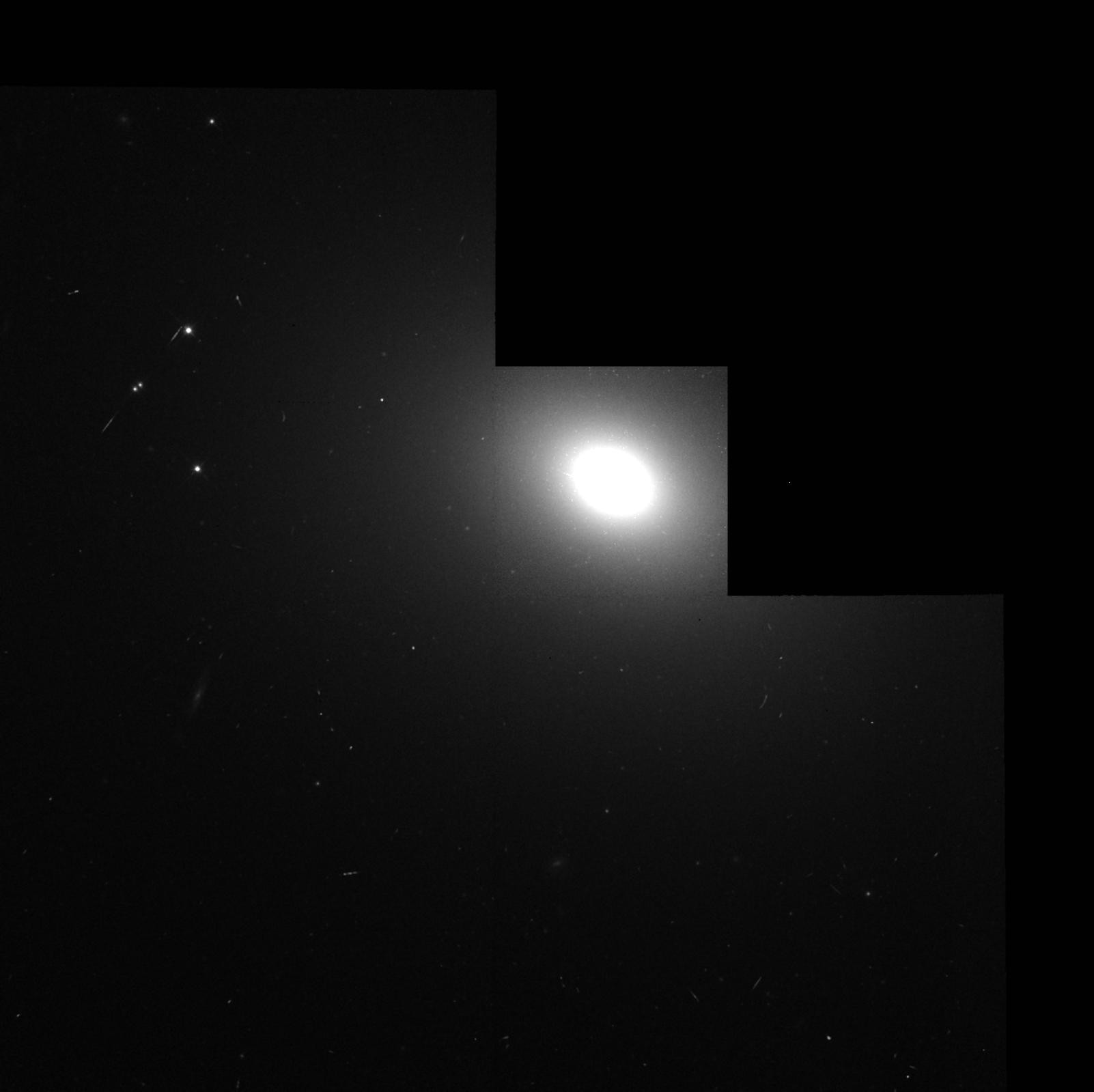
IC 1459 imaged by the Hubble Space Telescope

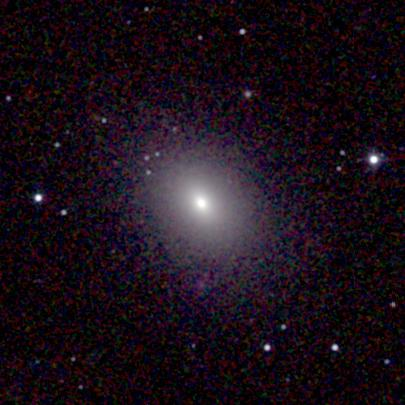
2MASS image of IC 1459

== See also ==
- NGC 1052 - a similar elliptical galaxy
