= NGC 7634 =

Galaxy in the constellation Pegasus

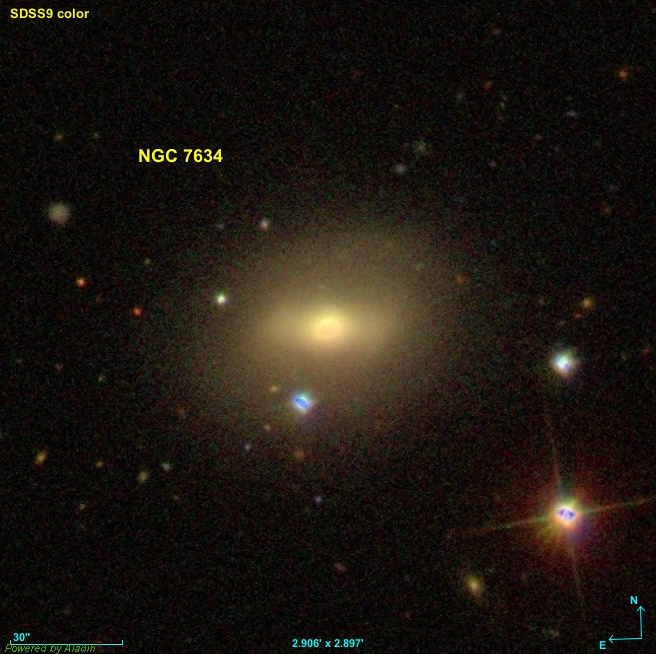
- NGC 7634 imaged by SDSS

Observation data (J2000 epoch)
- Constellation: Pegasus
- Right ascension: 23^{h} 21^{m} 41.7500^{s}
- Declination: +08° 53′ 12.704″
- Redshift: 0.017969±0.00000667
- Heliocentric radial velocity: 3,214±19 km/s
- Distance: 175.47 ± 5.89 Mly (53.800 ± 1.805 Mpc)
- Group or cluster: NGC 7619 group (LGG 473)
- Apparent magnitude (V): 13.57

Characteristics
- Type: SB0
- Size: ~89,900 ly (27.57 kpc) (estimated)
- Apparent size (V): 1.2′ × 0.9′

Other designations
- 2MASX J23214177+0853129, UGC 12542, MCG +01-59-062, PGC 71192, CGCG 406-085

NGC 7634 is a barred lenticular galaxy in the constellation of Pegasus. Its velocity with respect to the cosmic microwave background is 2,844±32 km/s, which corresponds to a Hubble distance of 136.8 ± 9.8 Mly (41.94 ± 2.99 Mpc). However, six non-redshift measurements give a farther mean distance of 175.47 ± 5.89 Mly (53.800 ± 1.805 Mpc). It was discovered by German-British astronomer William Herschel on 26 September 1785.

== NGC 7619 group ==
NGC 7634 is a member of the NGC 7619 group (also known as LGG 473). This galaxy group contains at least 25 members, including NGC 7518, NGC 7557, NGC 7562, NGC 7604, NGC 7608, NGC 7610, NGC 7611, NGC 7612, NGC 7619, NGC 7623, NGC 7626, NGC 7631, NGC 7648, IC 1474, and eight others.

== Supernova ==
One supernova has been observed in NGC 7634:

- SN 1972J (Type I, mag. 15) was discovered by Luisa Pigatto on 13 August 1972.

== See also ==
- List of NGC objects (7001–7840)
