= NGC 7541 =

Galaxy in the constellation Pisces

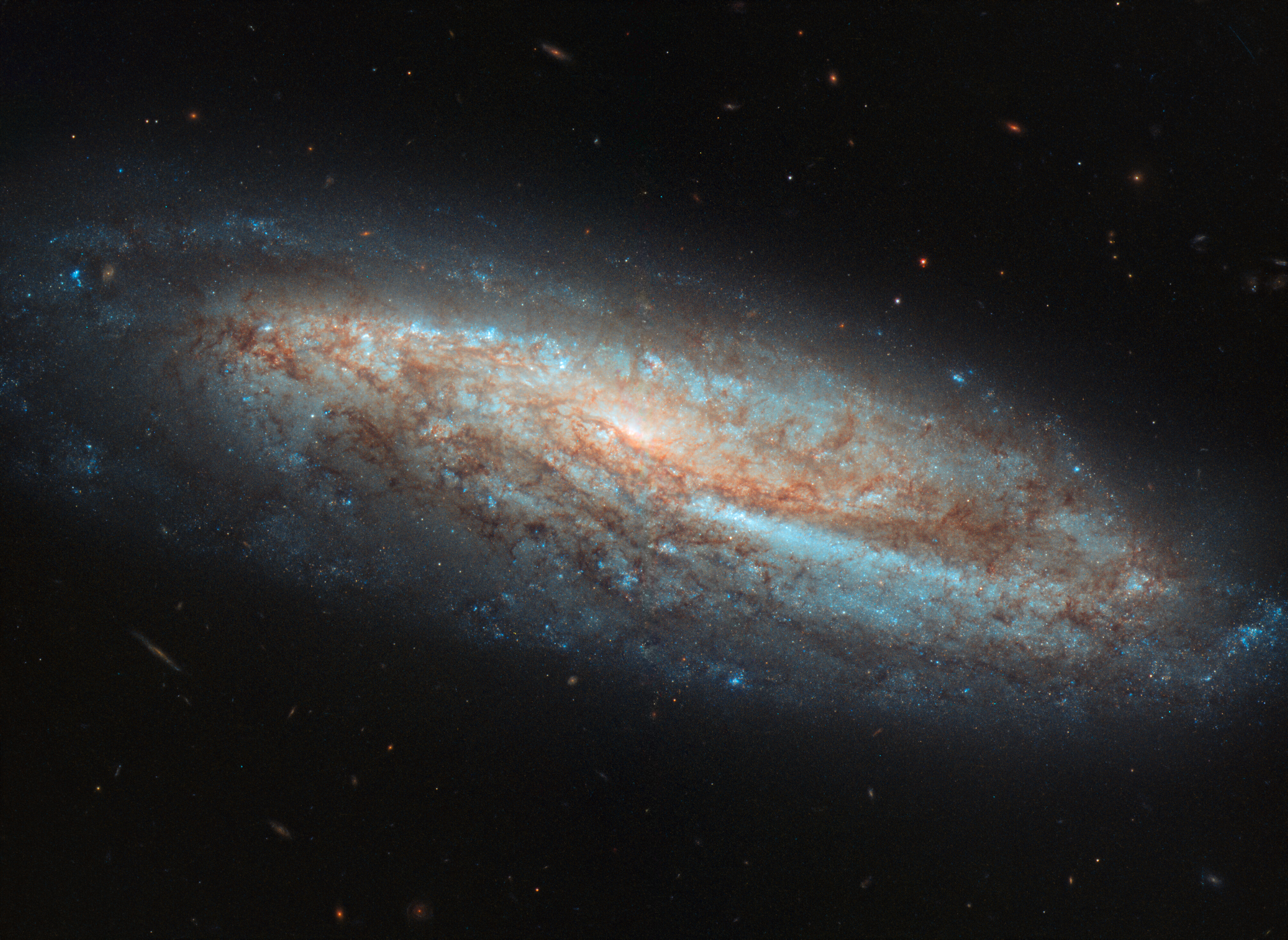
- NGC 7541 imaged by the Hubble Space Telescope

Observation data (J2000 epoch)
- Constellation: Pisces
- Right ascension: 23^{h} 14^{m} 43.90^{s}
- Declination: +4° 32′ 03.0″
- Redshift: 0.008936±0.000017
- Distance: 104 Mly (32.0 Mpc)
- Apparent magnitude (B): 12.7
- Magnitude (J): 9.439
- Magnitude (H): 8.757
- Magnitude (K): 8.351

Characteristics
- Type: SB(rs)bc
- Size: 106,000 ly
- Apparent size (V): 3.2 x 1.0
- Notable features: Lots of star-forming regions in spiral arms

Other designations
- PGC 70795, UGC 12447, MCG +01-59-017

NGC 7541 is a barred spiral galaxy located around 104 million light-years away in the constellation Pisces. It was discovered in 1785 by William Herschel, and it is 106,000 light-years across. NGC 7541 is known to have lots of star-forming regions.

== Characteristics ==
NGC 7541, like other barred spiral galaxies, has a bar in the center of it. The bar cuts through the center of the galaxy, and into the other side. This type of galaxy is known as "grand design". NGC 7541 is actually observed to have a higher-than-usual star formation rate, adding weight to the theory that spiral bars act as stellar nurseries, corralling and funneling inwards the material and fuel needed to create and nurture new baby stars. NGC 7541 also has an active galactic nuclei, as shown in the HST image.

== Galaxy Group and environment ==
NGC 7541 forms a pair with NGC 7537, a spiral galaxy 127 million light-years away, next to NGC 7541. The pair is known as Holm 805 in the catalogue of double and multiple galaxies by Erik Holmberg. The two galaxies have shown some signs of interaction, as two tidal tails form out of NGC 7541.

NGC 7541 is considered to be in a galaxy cluster known as Pegasus I galaxy cluster. It has at least 69 members, namely NGC 7518, NGC 7562A, NGC 7631, NGC 7591, NGC 7604, NGC 7819, NGC 7469, NGC 7529, NGC 7615, NGC 7608, NGC 7610, NGC 7648, NGC 7536, NGC 7515, NGC 7643, NGC 52, NGC 41 and NGC 85B.

== Supernovae ==
Two supernovae have been observed in NGC 7541:

- SN 1998dh (Type Ia, mag. 16.8) was discovered by the Lick Observatory Supernova Search (LOSS) on 20 July 1998.
- SN 2017jmk (Type II, mag. 18.5) was discovered by the Puckett Observatory Supernova Search (POSS) on 31 December 2017.
