= NGC 7631 =

Spiral galaxy in the constellation Pegasus

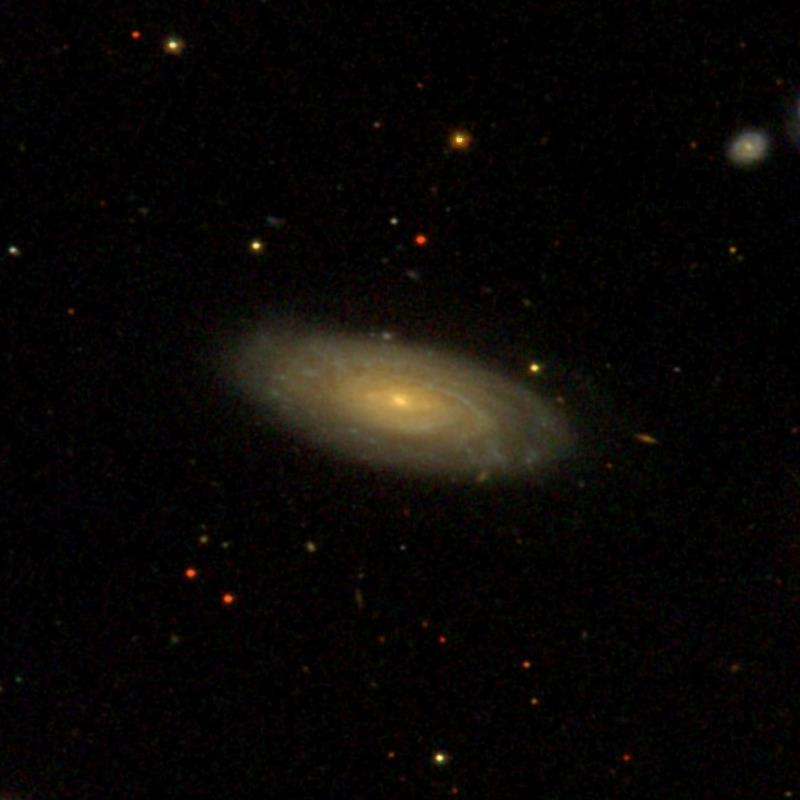
- NGC 7631 as seen by the Sloan Digital Sky Survey

Observation data
- Constellation: Pegasus
- Right ascension: 23^{h} 22^{m} 46^{s}
- Declination: +08° 21′ 37″
- Redshift: 0.012588
- Galactocentric velocity: 3750 km/s
- Distance: 50.421 ± 0.736 Megaparsec
- Group or cluster: Pegasus I Cluster
- Apparent magnitude (B): 13.8
- Magnitude (J): 10.820
- Magnitude (H): 10.231
- Magnitude (K): 9.924

Characteristics
- Type: Sb C
- Size: 54.62 kiloparsec

NGC 7631 is a spiral galaxy located in the constellation Pegasus. It was discovered on August 30, 1851, by the astronomer Bindon Blood Stoney.

== Galaxy cluster and group ==
NGC 7631 is part of a galaxy cluster known as Pegasus I galaxy cluster. It consists of at least 69 members, namely NGC 7518, NGC 7562A, NGC 52, NGC 7591, NGC 7604, NGC 7819, NGC 7469, NGC 7529, NGC 7615, NGC 7608, NGC 7610, NGC 7648, NGC 7536, NGC 7515, NGC 7643, NGC 41 and NGC 85B. NGC 7631 is part of the central area of the galaxy cluster.

NGC 7631 is also part of a galaxy group known as NGC 7619 Group or LGG 473. It consist of at least 23 members, namely NGC 7518, NGC 7562, NGC 7562A, NGC 7557, NGC 7557, NGC 7617, NGC 7604, NGC 7611, NGC 7619, NGC 7626, NGC 7623, NGC 7608, NGC 7610, NGC 7612, NGC 7648 and IC 1474.
