= NGC 52 =

Edge-on Spiral galaxy in the constellation of Pegasus

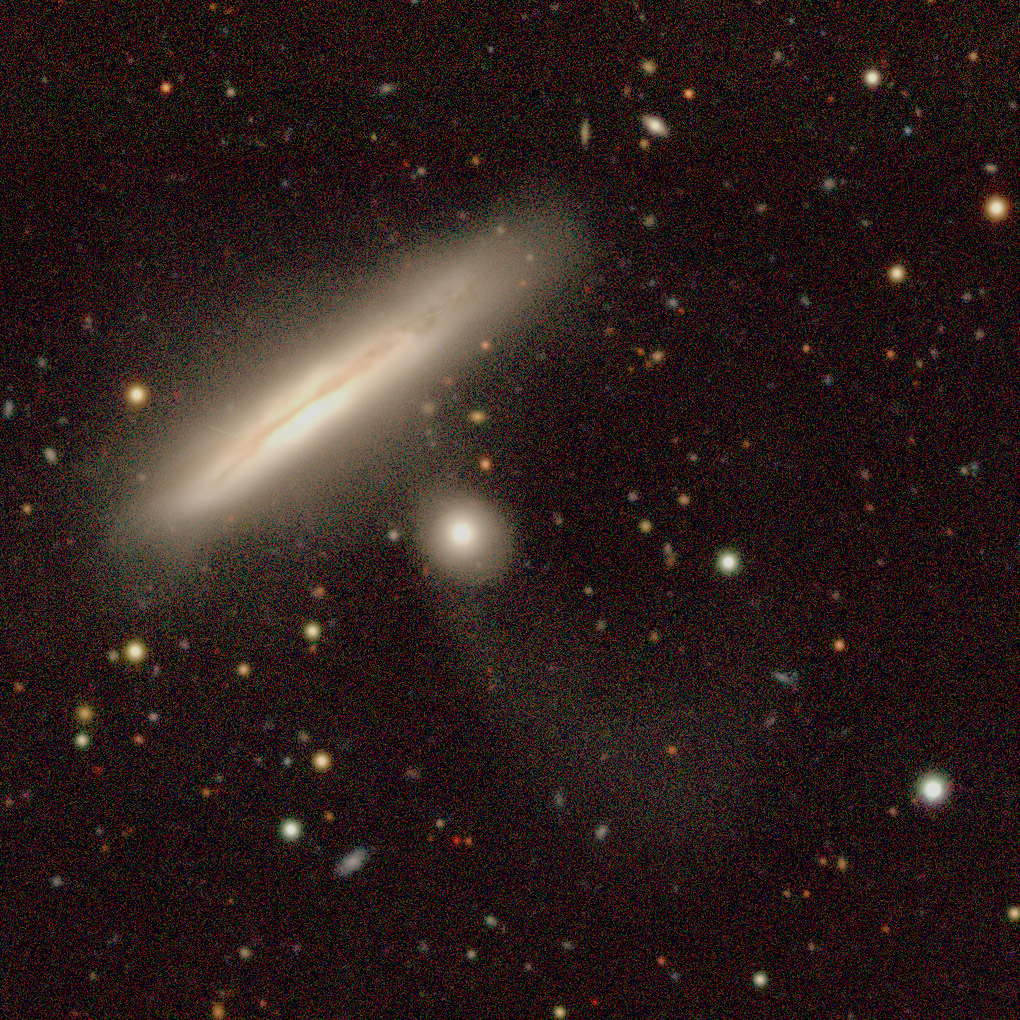
- NGC 52 and nearby PGC 1563523 (lower right) as seen on legacy survey

Observation data (2000.0 epoch)
- Constellation: Pegasus
- Right ascension: 00^{h} 14^{m} 40.2^{s}
- Declination: +18° 34′ 48″
- Redshift: 0.017986
- Heliocentric radial velocity: 5390 km/s
- Distance: 243,000,000ly (73,000,000 Parsecs)
- Apparent magnitude (V): 14.6

Characteristics
- Type: Sc
- Size: 150,000
- Apparent size (V): 2.6' × 0.5'

Other designations
- UGC 140, CGCG 456-042, CGCG 12.0+1817, MCG+03-01-030, 2MFGC 00177, 2MASX J00144010+1834551, 2MASXi J0014401+183455, IRAS 00120+1818, IRAS F00120+1818, AKARI J0014401+183453, LDCE 0011 NED002, PGC 978, UZC J001440.2+183454, NVSS J001440+183455

NGC 52 (PGC 978) is an edge-on spiral galaxy in the constellation Pegasus. It was discovered on September 18, 1784, by William Herschel. He described it as "very faint, small, extended."

== Physical characteristics ==
The galaxy is approximately 150,000 light years across. This makes it, in comparison, about 1.5 times as large as the Milky Way. The galaxy also has a satellite elliptical galaxy called PGC (Principal Galaxies Catalogue) 1563523.

== Galaxy Cluster ==
NGC 52 is part of a galaxy cluster known as Pegasus I galaxy cluster. It consists of at least 69 members, namely NGC 7518, NGC 7562A, NGC 7631, NGC 7591, NGC 7604, NGC 7819, NGC 7469, NGC 7529, NGC 7615, NGC 7608, NGC 7610, NGC 7648, NGC 7536, NGC 7515, NGC 7643, NGC 41 and NGC 85B. It is considered to be a non-spiral galaxy along with NGC 41, NGC 7816 and NGC 7817.

== See also ==
- List of NGC objects (1–1000)

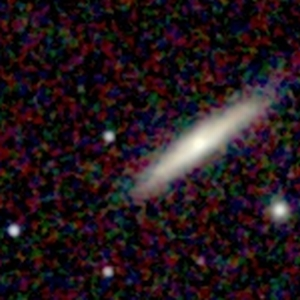
NGC 52 (2MASS)
