= NGC 6951 =

Galaxy in the constellation Cepheus

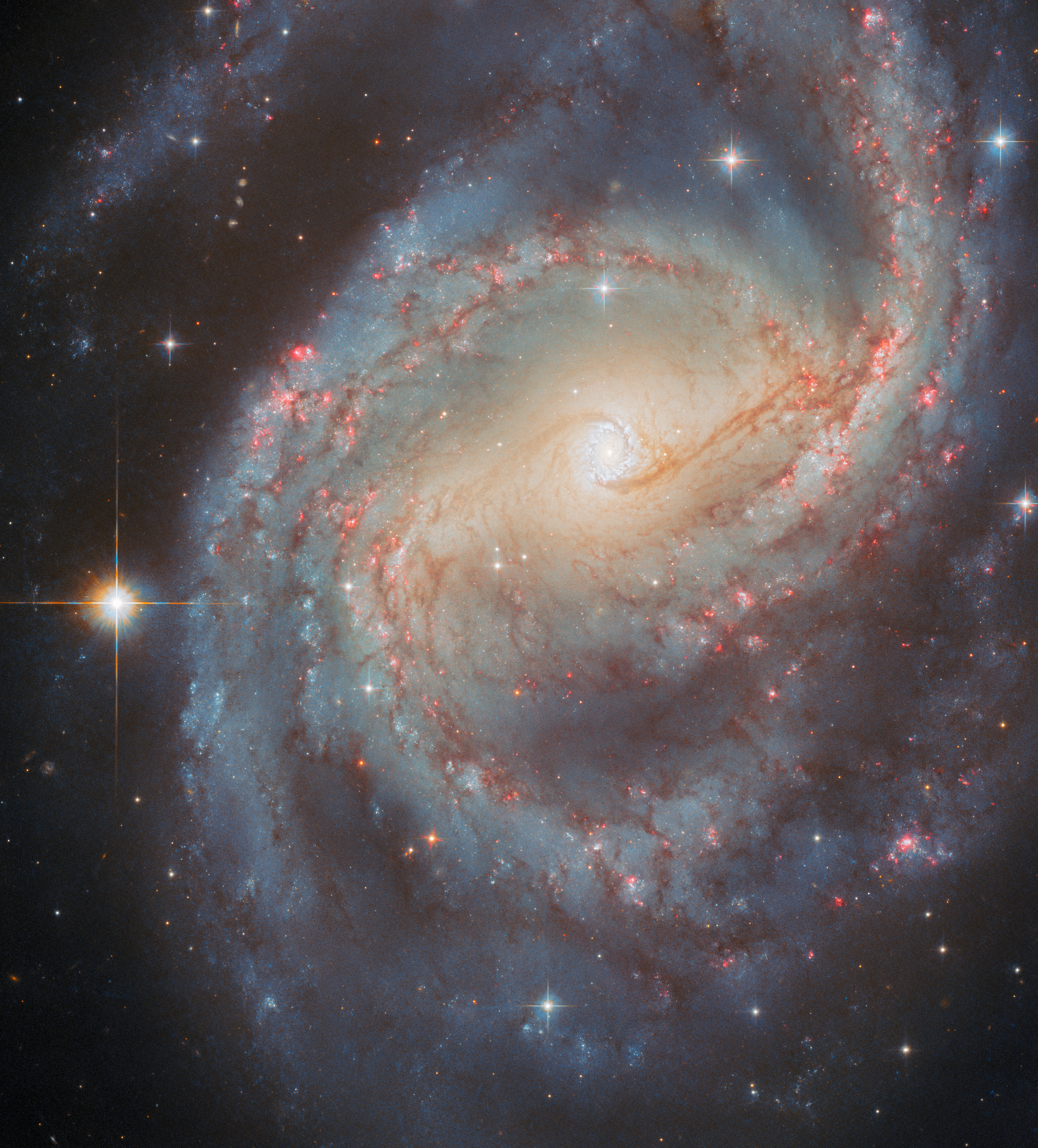
- NGC 6951 imaged by the Hubble Space Telescope

Observation data (J2000 epoch)
- Constellation: Cepheus
- Right ascension: 20^{h} 37^{m} 14.1192^{s}
- Declination: +66° 06′ 20.153″
- Redshift: 0.004750 ± 0.000005
- Heliocentric radial velocity: 1,424 ± 1 km/s (884.83 ± 0.62 mi/s)
- Distance: 75.25 ± 2.72 Mly (23.072 ± 0.835 Mpc)
- Apparent magnitude (V): 11.0

Characteristics
- Type: SAB(rs)bc
- Size: ~114,300 ly (35.03 kpc) (estimated)
- Apparent size (V): 3.9′ × 3.2′
- Notable features: Seyfert galaxy

Other designations
- IRAS 20366+6555, 2MASS J20371406+6606201, 2MASX J20371407+6606203, NGC 6952, UGC 11604, MCG +11-25-002, PGC 65086, CGCG 325-003

NGC 6951 (also catalogued as NGC 6952) is a barred spiral galaxy located in the constellation Cepheus. It is located at a distance of about 75 million light-years from Earth, which, given its apparent dimensions, means that NGC 6951 is about 100,000 light-years across. It was discovered by Jérôme Eugène Coggia in 1877 and independently by Lewis Swift in 1878.

== Characteristics ==
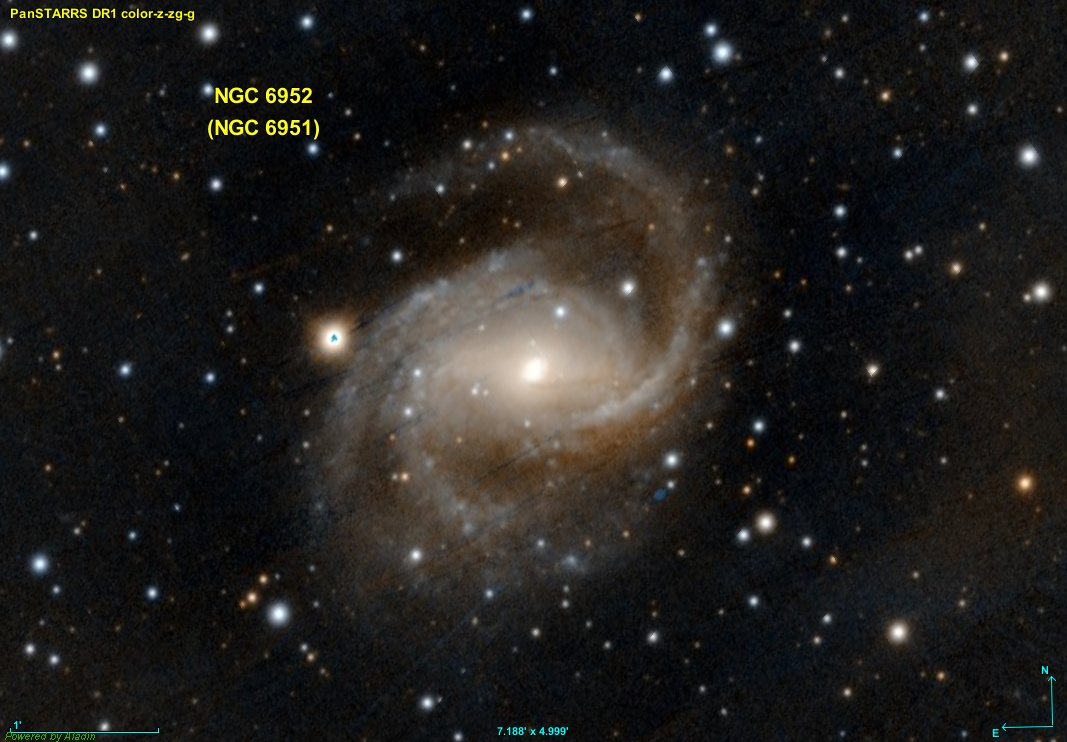
NGC 6951 imaged by Pan-STARRS

NGC 6951 has a large stellar bar with dust lanes running across it. These lanes come in contact with the circumnuclear ring at its north and south points. Gas is channeled inwards, towards the ring, through the bar. Observations in CO revealed also the presence of molecular gas with inflow motion towards the galactic nucleus. Since there are no signs of interaction with another galaxy in the isolated NGC 6951 for the last one billion years, it is believed that the origin of the gas is internal. Gas kinematics have also been observed for the rest of the galaxy, where the gravitational torques caused by the bar have a dominant role.

=== Active nucleus ===
The nucleus of NGC 6951 is active. It has been classified both as a type 2 Seyfert galaxy and a LINER and it has been suggested that it is in transition form, between a Seyfert galaxy and a very-high-excitation LINER, with very strong [N II] and [S II] lines. A supermassive black hole which accretes material in the centre of the galaxy is believed to be the cause of the nuclear activity. The upper mass limit of the supermassive black hole at the centre of NGC 6951 is estimated to be between 6 and 14 million M_{☉} based on velocity dispersion. Molecular gas, most probably a circumnuclear dust disk or torus less than 50 parsec in radius, has been detected around the nucleus.

=== Circumnuclear ring ===
Around the nucleus of NGC 6951 has been observed a star formation ring with a radius of 5 arcseconds. It also emits radio waves. The total gas mass at and inside the ring is estimated to be 3×10^{8} M_{☉}. Inside the ring is detected a spiral-like structure, with two spiral arms, that extends up to 0.5 arcseconds from the nucleus, while no inner bar was detected in the images obtained by Hubble Space Telescope. The central part of the nuclear area contains red supergiant stars. The ring is complete and features H II regions. It is characterised by a gradient in stellar population ages, with the younger stars being a few million years old while the older are more than a hundred million years old.

The stars in the ring form star clusters with masses between 10^{4} and 10^{6.8} M_{☉}. Although there have been observed clusters with ages as little as 4 million years or over one billion years, the star clusters predominantly have intermediate ages, with average ages of 200–300 million years, and are massive. Based on the ages of the clusters it is suggested that the most intense star formation in the ring took place 800 million years ago, then lowered, only to increase again 400 million years ago.

== Supernovae ==
Five supernovae have been observed in NGC 6951:

- SN 1999el (Type IIn, mag 15.4) was discovered by the Beijing Astronomical Observatory on 20 October 1999.
- SN 2000E (Type Ia, mag 14.3) was discovered by the Collurania-Teramo Observatory on 26 January 2000. This supernova was visible at the same time as SN 1999el.
- SN 2015G (Type Ibn, mag 15.5) was discovered by Kunihiro Shima on 23 March 2015.
- SN 2020dpw (Type II-P, mag. 17) was discovered by Patrick Wiggins on 26 February 2020.
- SN 2021sjt (Type IIb, mag. 18.58) was discovered by the Zwicky Transient Facility on 7 July 2021.

== See also ==
- NGC 5135 - a similar active galaxy
- List of NGC objects (6001–7000)
