= NGC 42 =

Galaxy in the constellation Pegasus

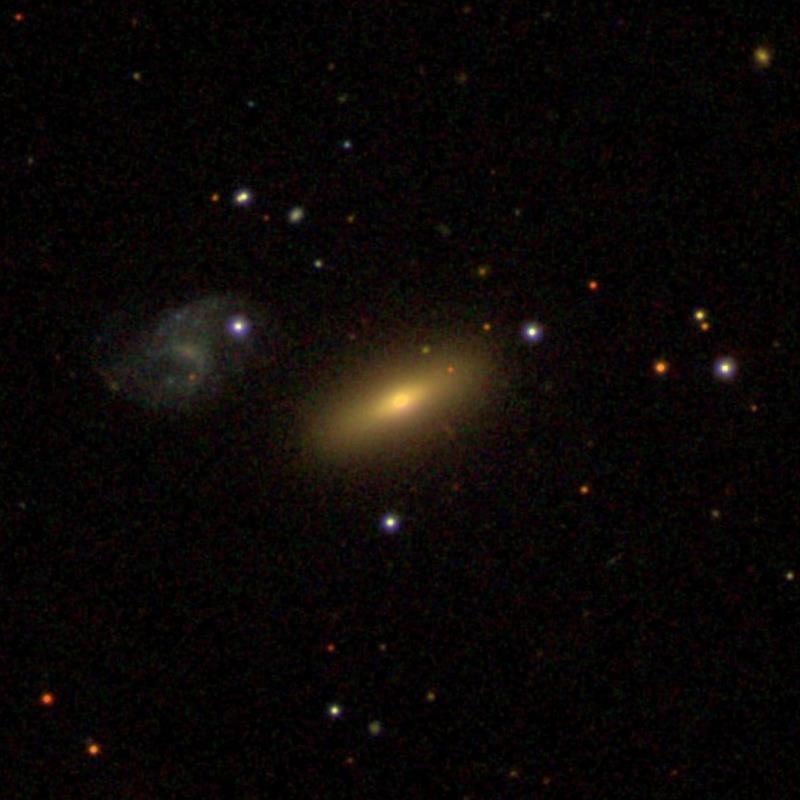
- SDSS image of NGC 42

Observation data (J2000 epoch)
- Constellation: Pegasus
- Right ascension: 00^{h} 12^{m} 56.361^{s}
- Declination: +22° 06′ 01.00″
- Redshift: 0.019927
- Heliocentric radial velocity: 5914 km/s
- Distance: 263.2 Mly (80.70 Mpc)
- Apparent magnitude (B): 15.07

Characteristics
- Type: S0^{−}:

Other designations
- UGC 118, MCG +04-01-041, PGC 867

NGC 42 is a lenticular galaxy in the constellation Pegasus. It was discovered on October 30, 1864, by the German astronomer Albert Marth. It may be gravitationally interacting with the nearby NGC 41.

== See also ==
- NGC
- List of NGC objects (1–1000)
- List of NGC objects
- Galaxy
