= NGC 41 =

Galaxy in the constellation Pegasus

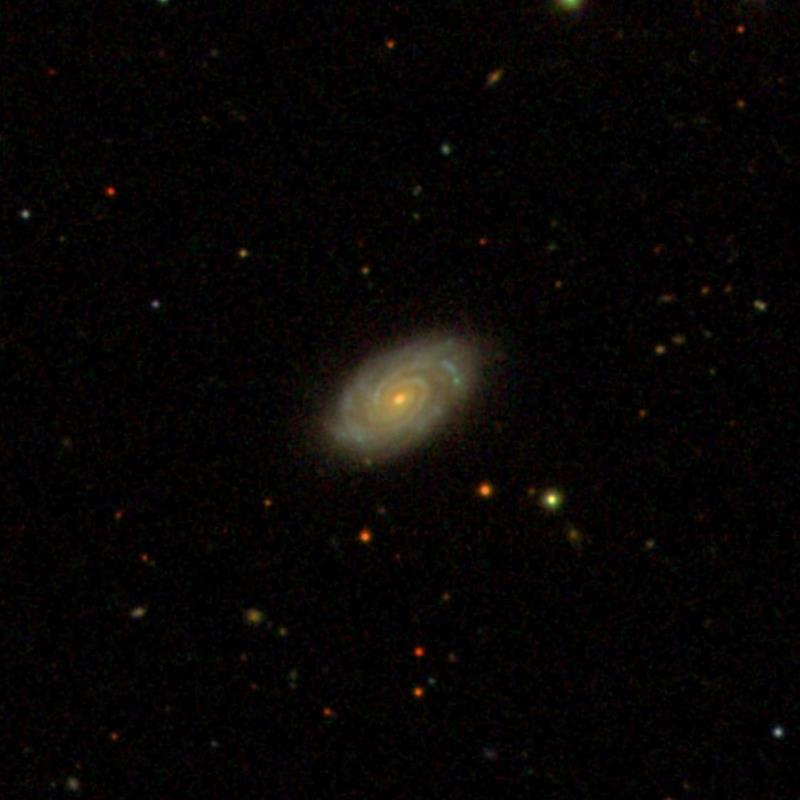
- SDSS image of NGC 41

Observation data (J2000 epoch)
- Constellation: Pegasus
- Right ascension: 00^{h} 12^{m} 47.952^{s}
- Declination: +22° 01′ 23.96″
- Redshift: 0.019710
- Heliocentric radial velocity: 5851 km/s
- Distance: 286.69 ± 0.65 Mly (87.90 ± 0.20 Mpc)
- Apparent magnitude (B): 14.6
- Magnitude (J): 11.675
- Magnitude (H): 11.063
- Magnitude (K): 10.614

Characteristics
- Type: Sc

Other designations
- MCG +04-01-039, PGC 865

NGC 41 is a spiral galaxy located in the constellation Pegasus. It is located about 290 million light-years (90 Megaparsecs) away from the Sun. It was discovered on October 30, 1864, by the astronomer Albert Marth.

== Galaxy Cluster ==
NGC 41 is part of a galaxy cluster known as Pegasus I galaxy cluster. It consists of at least 69 members, namely NGC 7518, NGC 7562A, NGC 7631, NGC 7591, NGC 7604, NGC 7819, NGC 7469, NGC 7529, NGC 7615, NGC 7608, NGC 7610, NGC 7648, NGC 7536, NGC 7515, NGC 7643, NGC 52 and NGC 85B. It is considered to be a non-spiral galaxy along with NGC 52, NGC 7816 and NGC 7817.

== See also ==
- NGC
- List of NGC objects (1–1000)
- List of NGC objects
- Galaxy
