= NGC 1241 =

Galaxy in the constellation Eridanus

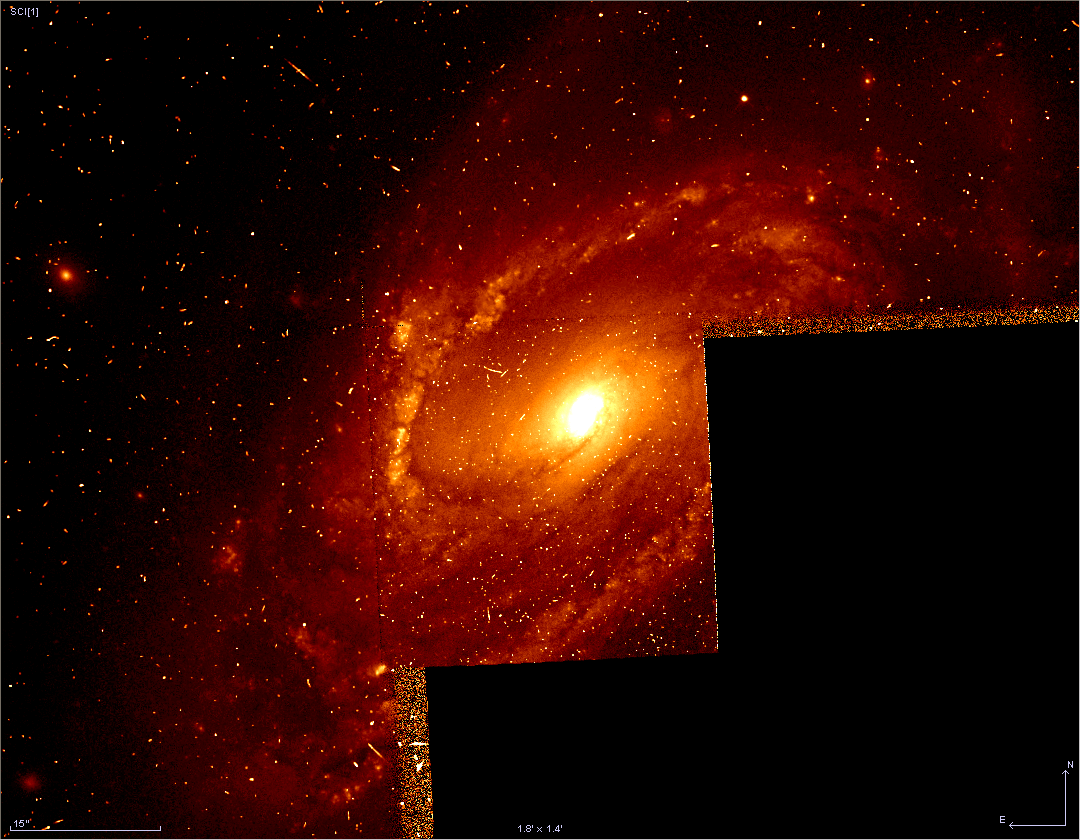
- NGC 1241 by Hubble Space Telescope

Observation data (J2000 epoch)
- Constellation: Eridanus
- Right ascension: 03^{h} 11^{m} 14.6^{s}
- Declination: −08° 55′ 20″
- Redshift: 0.016652 ± 0.000020
- Heliocentric radial velocity: 4,052 ± 4 km/s
- Distance: 144 ± 36 Mly (44.1 ± 11 Mpc)
- Apparent magnitude (V): 12.2

Characteristics
- Type: SB(rs)b
- Apparent size (V): 3.3′ × 2.2′
- Notable features: Seyfert galaxy

Other designations
- ARP 304, MCG -02-09-011, VV 334a, Holmberg 068A, PGC 11887

NGC 1241 is a spiral galaxy located in the constellation Eridanus. It is located at a distance of about 150 million light years from Earth, which, given its apparent dimensions, means that NGC 1241 is about 140,000 light years across. It was discovered by William Herschel on January 10, 1785. It is classified as a Seyfert galaxy.

NGC 1241 interacts with its smaller companion NGC 1242, forming a pair collectively known in the Atlas of Peculiar Galaxies as Arp 304.

== Characteristics ==
NGC 1241 is a barred spiral galaxy seen at an inclination. It has two well defined dusty spiral arms, and thus is characterised as a grand design spiral galaxy. The bulge is boxy, characteristic of a barred galaxy, with the arms emerging from each end of the bar, with the north one appearing more tightly wound than the southern. The main arms branch into smaller ones.

A circumnuclear ring with active star formation has been detected in the central region of the galaxy. It appears clumpy and inclined and measures 5.6 × 3.4 arcseconds in diameter, lying just inside the inner Lindblad resonance. A faint spiral pattern with leading arms has been found to emanate from it in Paα emission, while in K_{s} and J band, the pattern appears trailing. NGC 1241 is one of the few galaxies with known trailing features in the nuclear regions, with the other being NGC 6902. Inside the circumnuclear ring was detected a bar like feature 1.6 arcseconds long that is almost perpendicular to the main bar of the galaxy.

The nucleus of NGC 1241 has been found to be active and it has been categorised as a type II Seyfert galaxy. The most accepted theory for the energy source of active galactic nuclei is the presence of an accretion disk around a supermassive black hole. The mass of the black hole in the centre of NGC 1241 is estimated to be 10^{7.46} (29 million) M_{☉}.

The star formation rate of NGC 1241 is estimated to be 3.07 M_{☉} per year based on the H-alpha flux.

== Nearby galaxies ==
NGC 1241 forms a pair with NGC 1242, which lies at an angular separation of 1.6 arcminutes. NGC 1243 lies 3.1 arcminutes away, but it has been identified as a double star in our galaxy. According to Garcia et al. the pair of galaxies is part of a galaxy group known as LGG 84, which also includes the galaxies NGC 1247, MCG -02-09-006, and Markarian 1071. A more recent study placed NGC 1241 in the same group as the galaxies NGC 1185, NGC 1204, NGC 1214, NGC 1215, NGC 1238, and NGC 1247.

== Gallery ==
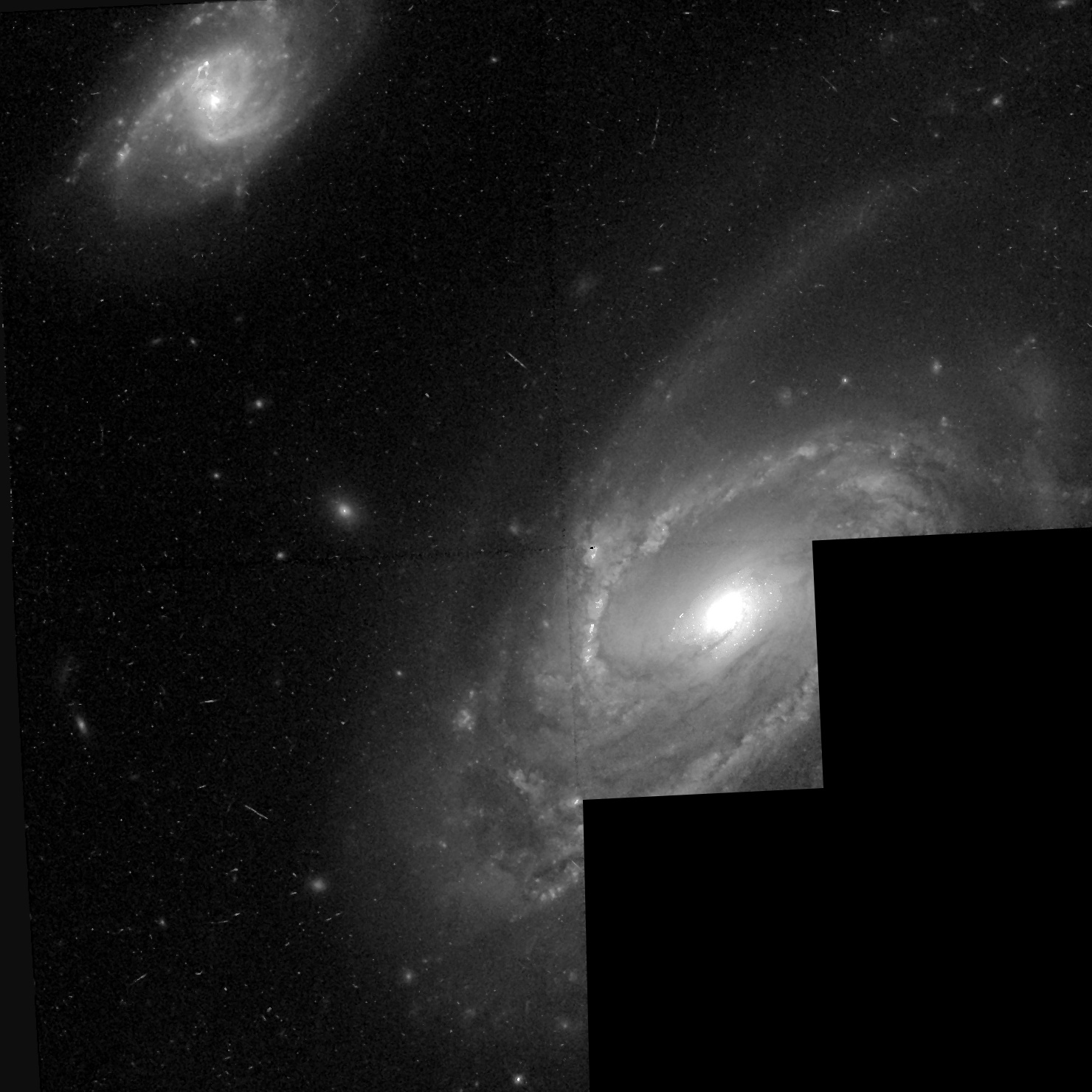
NGC 1241 and NGC 1242 as seen by Hubble Space Telescope

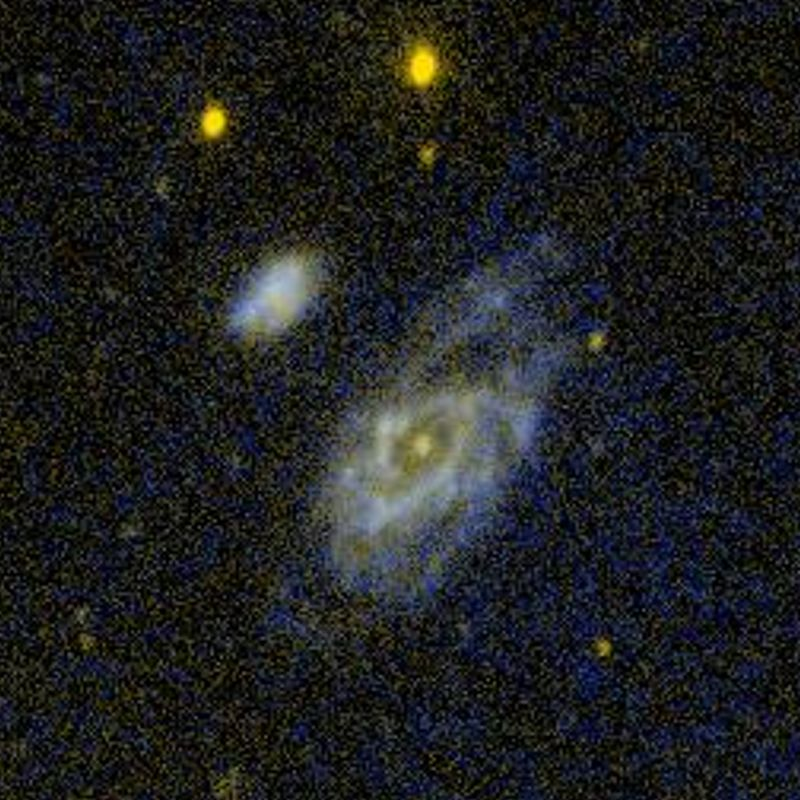
NGC 1241 in ultraviolet by GALEX

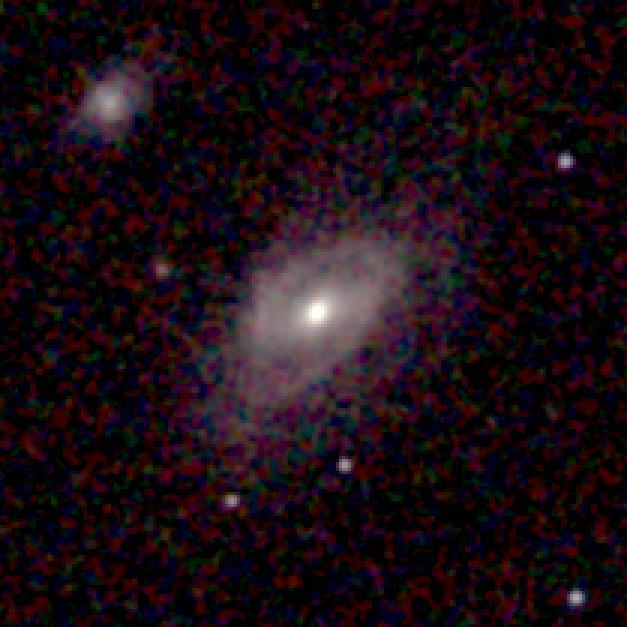
NGC 1241 in infrared by 2MASS

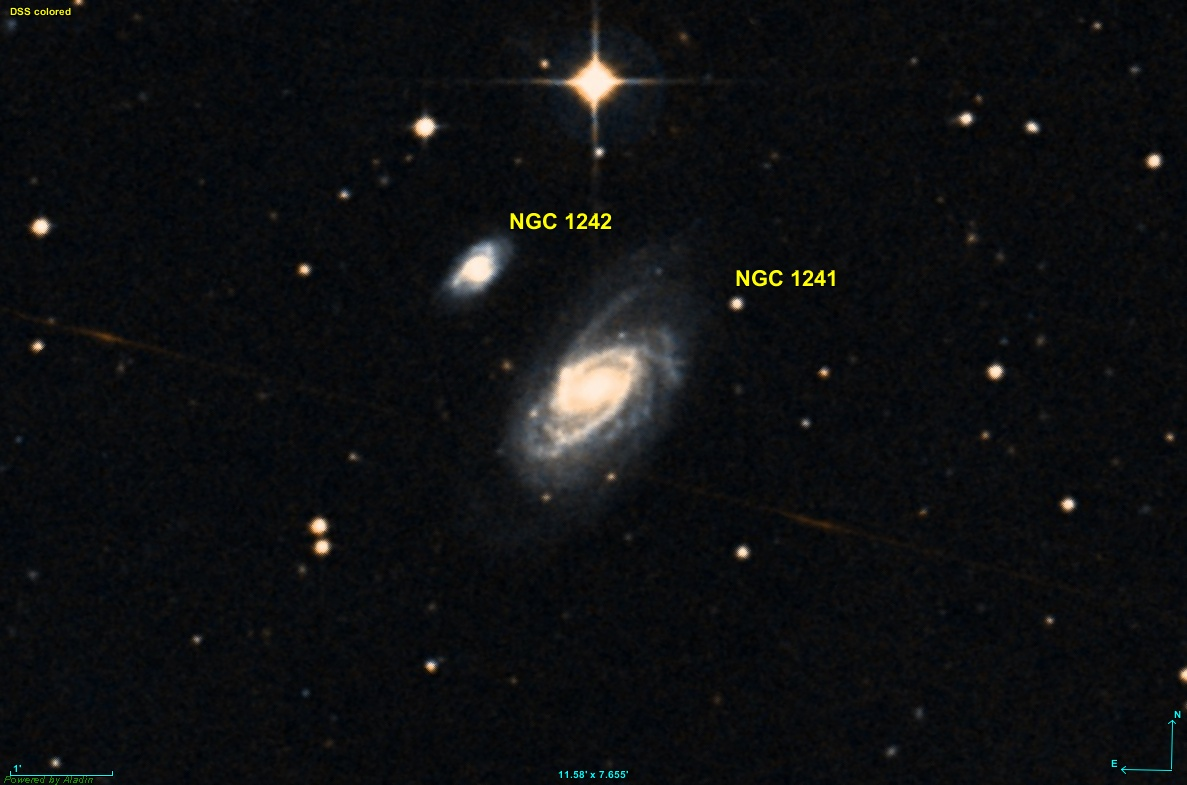
NGC 1241 by DSS

== See also ==
- NGC 7469, another interacting Seyfert galaxy with a circumnuclear star formation ring
