= NGC 5135 =

Galaxy in the constellation Hydra

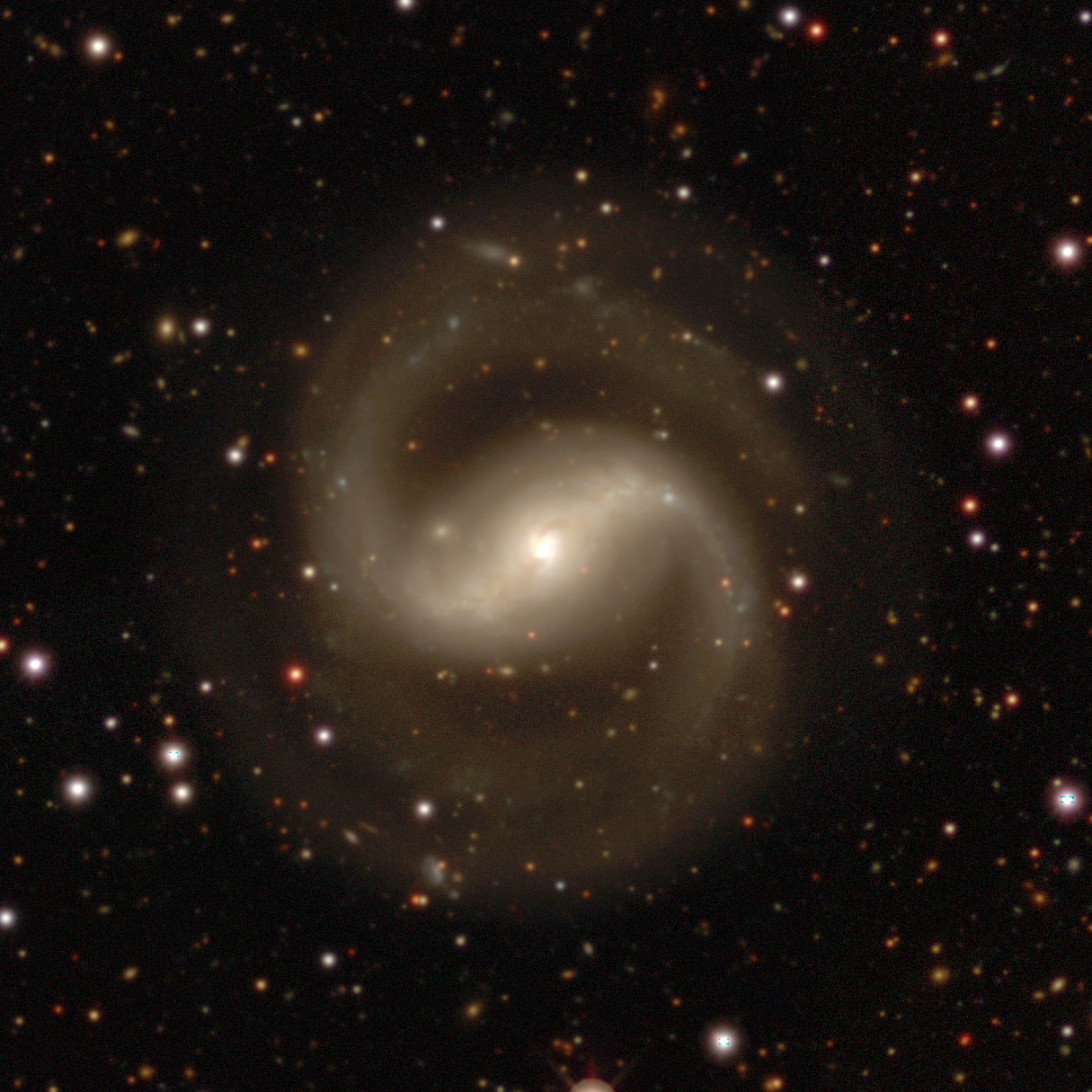
- NGC 5135 by legacy surveys

Observation data (J2000 epoch)
- Constellation: Hydra
- Right ascension: 13^{h} 25^{m} 44.1^{s}
- Declination: −29° 50′ 01″
- Redshift: 0.013693 ± 0.000020
- Heliocentric radial velocity: 4,105 ± 6 km/s
- Distance: 194 Mly
- Apparent magnitude (V): 12.9

Characteristics
- Type: SB(l)ab
- Apparent size (V): 2.6′ × 1.8′
- Notable features: Seyfert galaxy

Other designations
- ESO 444-G032, MCG -05-32-013, PGC 46974

NGC 5135 is a barred spiral galaxy located in the constellation Hydra. It is located at a distance of about 200 million light years from Earth. It was discovered by John Herschel on May 8, 1834. It is a Seyfert galaxy.

== Characteristics ==
NGC 5135 has well defined spiral arms and is considered a grand design spiral galaxy. There is star formation along the leading edges of the arms. There are dust lanes along the bar that curve towards the centre of galaxy. Spiral arms become less well structured in the central regions.

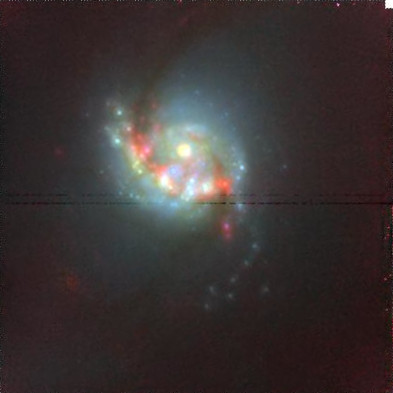
Near infrared image of the central region of NGC 5135 by Hubble Space Telescope.

NGC 5135 is a bright source in infrared light and with total infrared luminosity of 10^{11.16}−10^{11.23} L_{☉} is considered a luminous infrared galaxy. Also strong ultraviolet emission was detected in the central 2 arcseconds of the galaxy, with a dozen of prominent knots, indicative of a recent starburst. The total star formation rate in the galaxy is estimated to be 15.61 ± 1.87 M_{☉} per year. Knots of gas measuring 45–180 parsecs across are detected along the inner spiral arms in CO(6-5) imaging and some of them are associated with starburst regions.

The nucleus of NGC 5135 has been found to be active and it has been categorised as a type II Seyfert galaxy. The most accepted theory for the energy source of active galactic nuclei is the presence of an accretion disk around a supermassive black hole. The mass of the black hole in the centre of NGC 5135 is estimated to be 10^{7.29} (19 million) M_{☉}.

The active nucleus is obscured in X-rays by Compton-thick material with a column density of 6.7+16.6
−2.8×10^{24}/cm^{2}. An ionization cone has been detected in [Si vi] emission that extends for 600 parsec from the nucleus. To the ionization of the gas apart from the active nucleus also contribute supernova remnant shocks and young stars.

== Supernova ==
One supernova has been observed in NGC 5135:

- SN 2023dpj (Type II, mag. 16.97) was discovered by MeerLICHT on 18 March 2023.

== Nearby galaxies ==
NGC 5135 belongs to a galaxy group known as LGG 351 or NGC 5135 group. Other members of the group include ESO 444- 12, NGC 5124, IC 4248, NGC 5150, NGC 5152, NGC 5153, IC 4275, NGC 5182, ESO 444- 47, ESO 444- 15, ESO 444- 21 and IC 4251, along with NGC 5126. IC 4248, which lies 13.5 arcminutes from NGC 5135 and form a pair, looks distorted and asymmetrical.

== See also ==
- NGC 1241 and NGC 7469 - Seyfert galaxies with circumnuclear star formation ring
