= NGC 7610 =

Galaxy in the constellation Pegasus

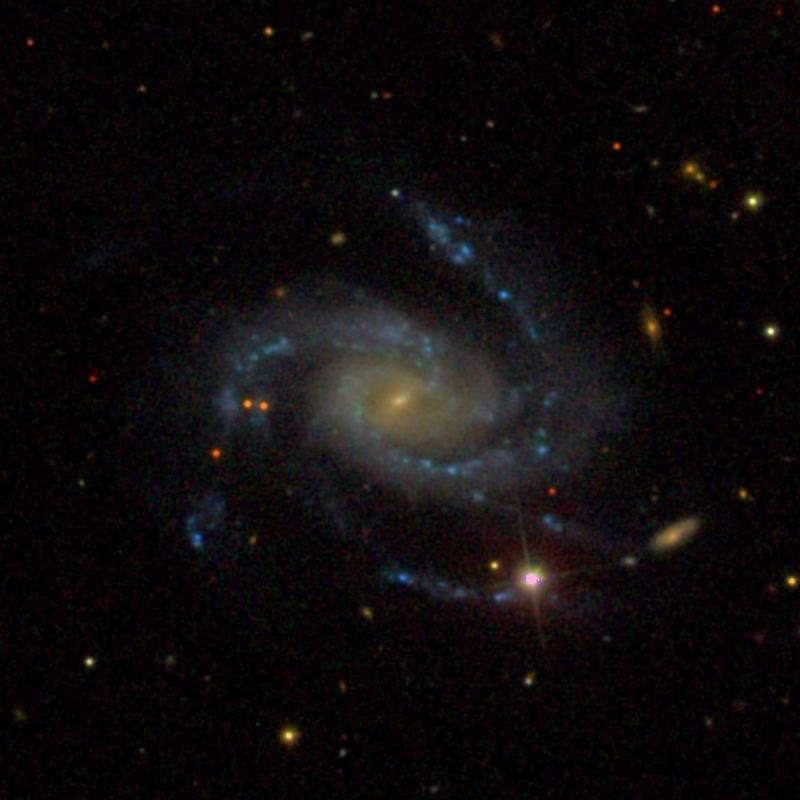
- SDSS image of NGC 7610

Observation data (J2000 epoch)
- Constellation: Pegasus
- Right ascension: 23^{h} 19^{m} 41.3906^{s}
- Declination: +10° 11′ 05.838″
- Redshift: 0.011855
- Heliocentric radial velocity: 3554 ± 1 km/s
- Distance: 160 Mly
- Apparent magnitude (V): +13.44
- Apparent magnitude (B): 14.9
- Magnitude (J): 11.946
- Magnitude (H): 11.270
- Magnitude (K): 11.034

Characteristics
- Type: Scd
- Size: ~110,100 ly (33.75 kpc) (estimated)
- Apparent size (V): 2.5′ × 1.9′

Other designations
- IRAS 23171+0954, NGC 7616, UGC 12511, MCG +02-59-025, PGC 71087, CGCG 431-042

NGC 7610 is a spiral galaxy in the constellation Pegasus. Discovered by Andrew Ainslie Common in August 1880, it was accidentally "rediscovered" by him the same month, and later given the designation NGC 7616.

== Galaxy cluster and group ==
NGC 7610 is part of a galaxy cluster known as Pegasus I galaxy cluster. It consists of at least 69 members, namely NGC 7518, NGC 7562A, NGC 52, NGC 7591, NGC 7604, NGC 7819, NGC 7469, NGC 7529, NGC 7615, NGC 7608, NGC 7631, NGC 7648, NGC 7536, NGC 7515, NGC 7643, NGC 41 and NGC 85B. NGC 7631 is part of the central area of the galaxy cluster.

NGC 7610 is also part of a galaxy group known as NGC 7619 Group or LGG 473. It consist of at least 23 members, namely NGC 7518, NGC 7562, NGC 7562A, NGC 7557, NGC 7557, NGC 7617, NGC 7604, NGC 7611, NGC 7619, NGC 7626, NGC 7623, NGC 7608, NGC 7623, NGC 7631, NGC 7612, NGC 7648 and IC 1474.

== Supernova ==
One supernova has been observed in NGC 7610: SN 2013fs (Type II-P, mag. 16.5) was discovered by Kōichi Itagaki on 7 October 2013. It was detected approximately 3 hours after the light from the explosion reached Earth, and within a few hours optical spectra were obtained - the earliest such observations ever made of a supernova.

== See also ==
- List of NGC objects (7001–7840)
