= NGC 7648 =

Galaxy in the constellation Pegasus

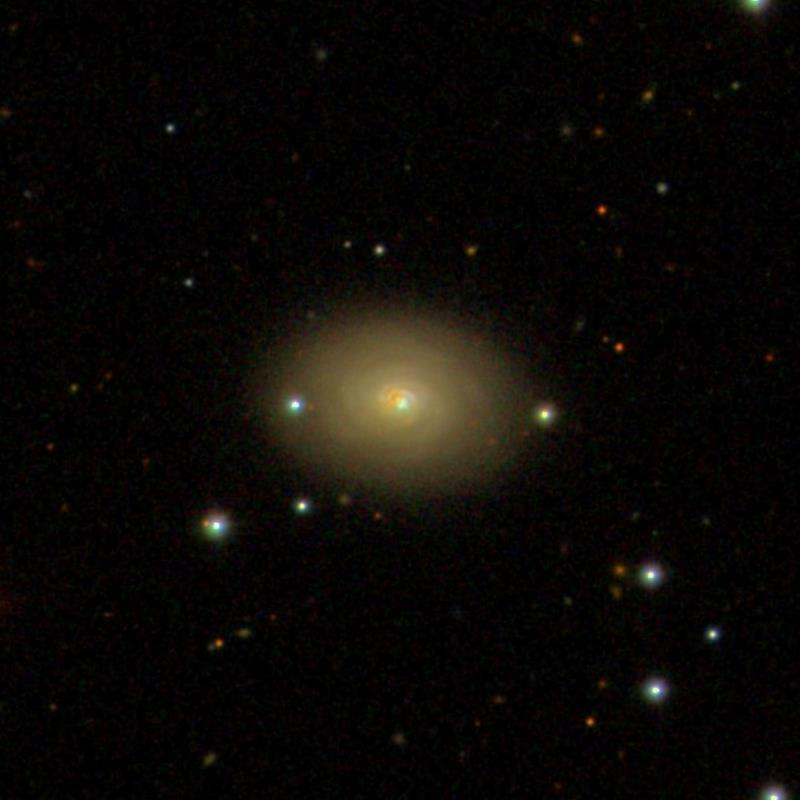
- NGC 7648 (SDSS DR14)

Observation data (J2000 epoch)
- Constellation: Pegasus
- Right ascension: 23^{h} 25^{m} 12^{s}
- Declination: +09° 48′ 37″
- Redshift: 0.011872
- Heliocentric radial velocity: 3,559 km/s
- Distance: 153 Mly
- Apparent magnitude (B): 13.5
- Magnitude (J): 10.720
- Magnitude (H): 10.011
- Magnitude (K): 9.696

Characteristics
- Type: S0
- Size: ~47,100 ly (14.44 kpc) (estimated)

Other designations
- IC 1486, PGC 71321, MCG +01-59-071, MRK 531, UGC 12575

NGC 7648 is a lenticular galaxy in the constellation Pegasus. It was discovered on October 18, 1784, by the astronomer William Herschel but also observed by astronomers Heinrich d'Arrest and Édouard Stephan. The redshift of the galaxy is estimated to be (z) 0.011. This galaxy has also been designated as IC 1486 when it was observed again by the French astronomer Guillaume Bigourdan.

The nucleus of the galaxy has been described to shine brightly in ultraviolet rays, thus being listed in the Markarian catalogue as MRK 531.

== Galaxy cluster and group ==
NGC 7648 is part of a galaxy cluster known as Pegasus I galaxy cluster. It consists of at least 69 members, namely NGC 7518, NGC 7562A, NGC 52, NGC 7591, NGC 7604, NGC 7819, NGC 7469, NGC 7529, NGC 7615, NGC 7608, NGC 7610, NGC 7631, NGC 7536, NGC 7515, NGC 7643, NGC 41, NGC 7511, NGC 7495, NGC 7535, NGC 7563, NGC 7570, NGC 7593, NGC 7580 and NGC 85B. NGC 7648 is considered to be in the central area of the galaxy cluster.

NGC 7648 is also part of a galaxy group known as NGC 7619 Group or LGG 473. It consist of at least 23 members, namely NGC 7518, NGC 7562, NGC 7562A, NGC 7557, NGC 7557, NGC 7617, NGC 7604, NGC 7611, NGC 7619, NGC 7626, NGC 7623, NGC 7608, NGC 7623, NGC 7610, NGC 7612, NGC 7631 and IC 1474.
