= NGC 7562 =

Galaxy in the constellation Pisces

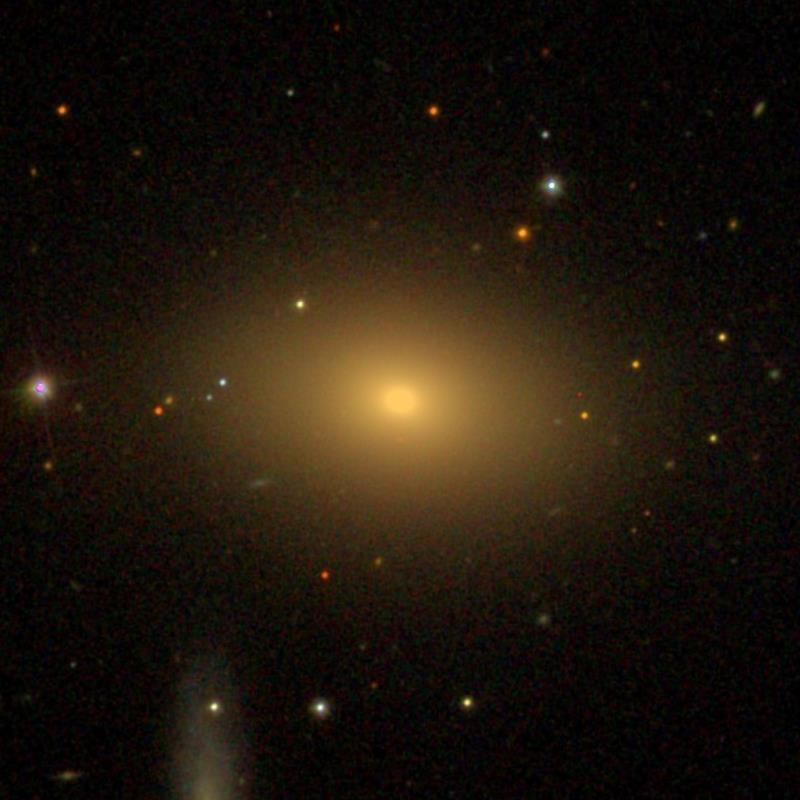
- NGC 7562 seen by SDSS Data Release 14

Observation data
- Constellation: Pisces
- Right ascension: 23^{h} 17^{m} 17^{s}
- Declination: +06° 49′ 46″
- Redshift: 0.03362
- Heliocentric radial velocity: 9910 km/s
- Distance: 126 Megaparsec
- Group or cluster: LGG 473
- Apparent magnitude (B): 14.52
- Magnitude (J): 11.492
- Magnitude (H): 10.798
- Magnitude (K): 10.614

Characteristics
- Type: (R')SA(r)a pec
- Size: 155.58 kiloparsec

Other designations
- ESO 148-11, LEDA 71402

NGC 7562 is an elliptical galaxy located in the constellation Pisces. It was discovered on October 25, 1785 by the astronomer William Herschel.

According to a study published in 1996, NGC 7562 exhibits interstellar dust in regions near its core and a perturbed, shell-like or ripple-like structure in its outer regions. The authors of this study suggest these features could be due to accretion of material from NGC 7557 or to gravitational interaction with it. NGC 7652 is a Seyfert 2 galaxy.

NGC 7562 is also part of a galaxy group known as NGC 7619 Group or LGG 473. It consist of at least 23 members, namely NGC 7518, NGC 7631, NGC 7562A, NGC 7557, NGC 7557, NGC 7617, NGC 7604, NGC 7611, NGC 7619, NGC 7626, NGC 7623, NGC 7608, NGC 7623, NGC 7610, NGC 7612, NGC 7648 and IC 1474.
