= NGC 7623 =

Lenticular galaxy in Pegasus

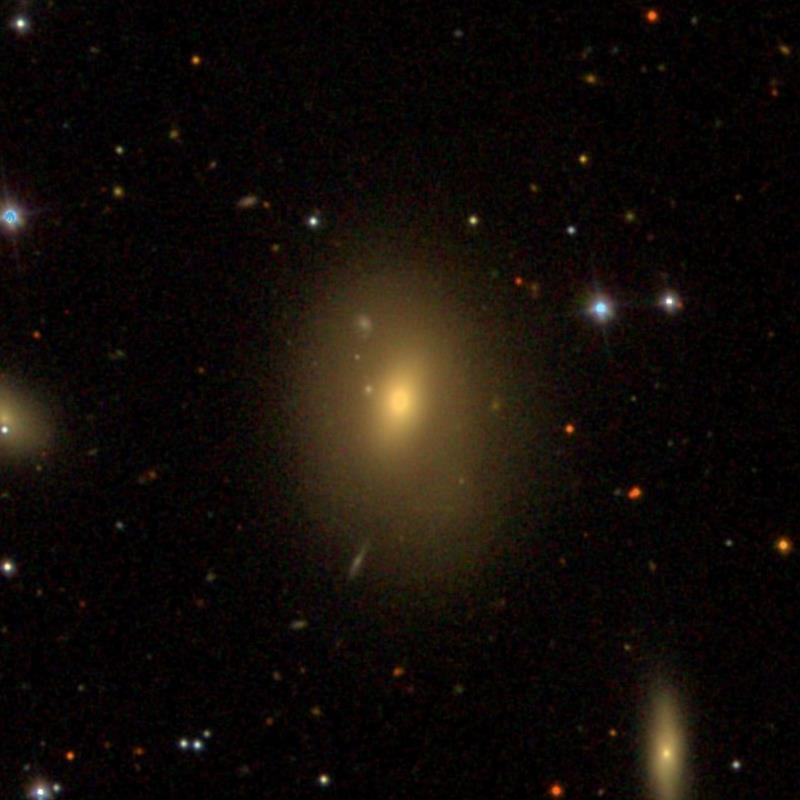
- NGC 7623 as observed by the Sloan Digital Sky Survey

Observation data (J2000 epoch)
- Constellation: Pegasus
- Right ascension: 23^{h} 20^{m} 38.7^{s}
- Declination: +08° 13′ 54″
- Redshift: 0.011313
- Galactocentric velocity: 3662 km/s
- Distance: ~160 million
- Apparent magnitude (B): 13.9
- Magnitude (J): 10.450
- Magnitude (H): 9.745
- Magnitude (K): 9.461

Characteristics
- Type: SA0^0?
- Size: 52.44 kiloparsec
- Apparent size (V): 2.2′ × 1.6′

Other designations
- UGC 12498, PGC 71017, LEDA 71132

NGC 7623 is a lenticular galaxy located in the constellation Pegasus. It was discovered on September 26, 1785, by the German-British astronomer William Herschel.

The galaxy is situated at a distance of approximately 160 million light-years from the Milky Way, based on its redshift. NGC 7623 is classified as a lenticular (S0) galaxy, exhibiting structural characteristics intermediate between elliptical and spiral galaxies.

Multiwavelength observations, including optical and X-ray studies, suggest the presence of diffuse hot gas associated with the surrounding group environment, consistent with lenticular galaxies located in dense regions.

NGC 7623 is catalogued in several major astronomical databases, including the New General Catalogue, the Uppsala General Catalogue (UGC 12498), and the Principal Galaxies Catalogue (PGC 71017).

== Galaxy Group and Cluster ==
NGC 7623 is part of the Pegasus I Group, a nearby galaxy group composed primarily of early-type galaxies. It forms a close pair with the neighboring elliptical galaxy NGC 7626, and the two galaxies are frequently studied together in investigations of galaxy interactions and group dynamics.

NGC 7623 is also part of a galaxy group known as NGC 7619 Group or LGG 473. It consist of at least 23 members, namely NGC 7518, NGC 7562, NGC 7562A, NGC 7557, NGC 7557, NGC 7617, NGC 7604, NGC 7611, NGC 7619, NGC 7626, NGC 7608, NGC 7623, NGC 7610, NGC 7612, NGC 7648 and IC 1474.
