= NGC 7612 =

Galaxy in the constellation Pegasus

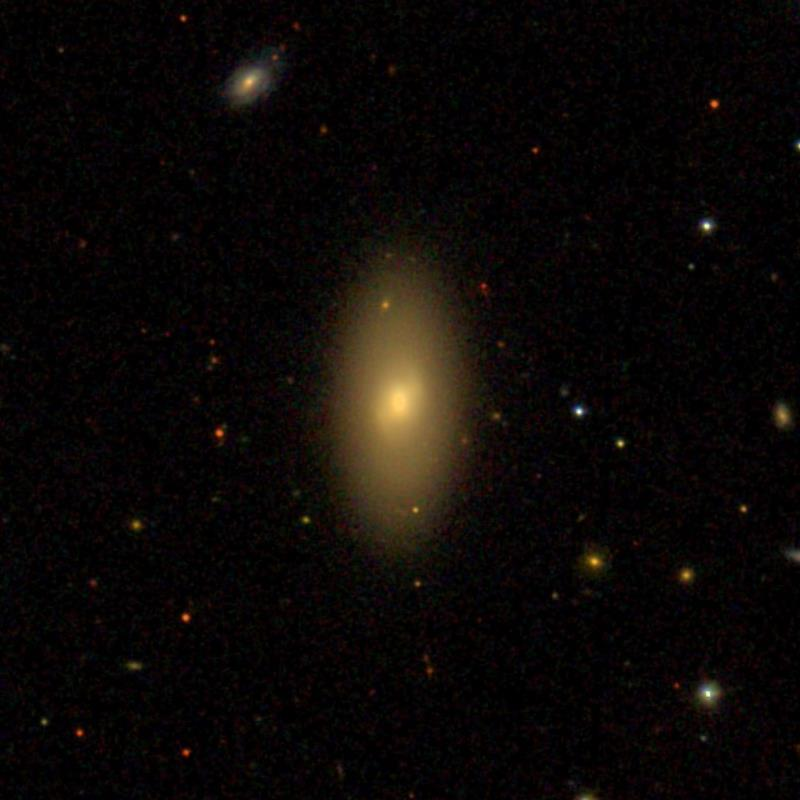
- NGC 7612 (SDSS DR14)

Observation data (J2000 epoch)
- Constellation: Pegasus
- Right ascension: 23^{h} 21^{m} 02^{s}
- Declination: +08° 43′ 07″
- Redshift: 0.010717
- Heliocentric radial velocity: 3193 km/s
- Distance: 46.050 ± 0.250 Megaparsec
- Group or cluster: LGG 473
- Apparent magnitude (B): 14.3
- Magnitude (J): 10.428
- Magnitude (H): 9.747
- Magnitude (K): 9.481

Characteristics
- Type: S0
- Size: 46.92 kiloparsec

Other designations
- UGC 12512, CGCG 406-068, CGCG 2317.2+0817, MCG +01-59-050, LEDA 71089

NGC 7612 is a lenticular galaxy located in the constellation Pegasus. It was discovered on May 26, 1863, by the astronomer Heinrich Louis d'Arrest.

== Galaxy Group ==
NGC 7612 is also part of a galaxy group known as NGC 7619 Group or LGG 473. It consist of at least 23 members, namely NGC 7518, NGC 7562, NGC 7562A, NGC 7557, NGC 7557, NGC 7617, NGC 7604, NGC 7611, NGC 7619, NGC 7626, NGC 7623, NGC 7608, NGC 7623, NGC 7610, NGC 7648 and IC 1474.
