= NGC 7818 =

Spiral galaxy in Pisces

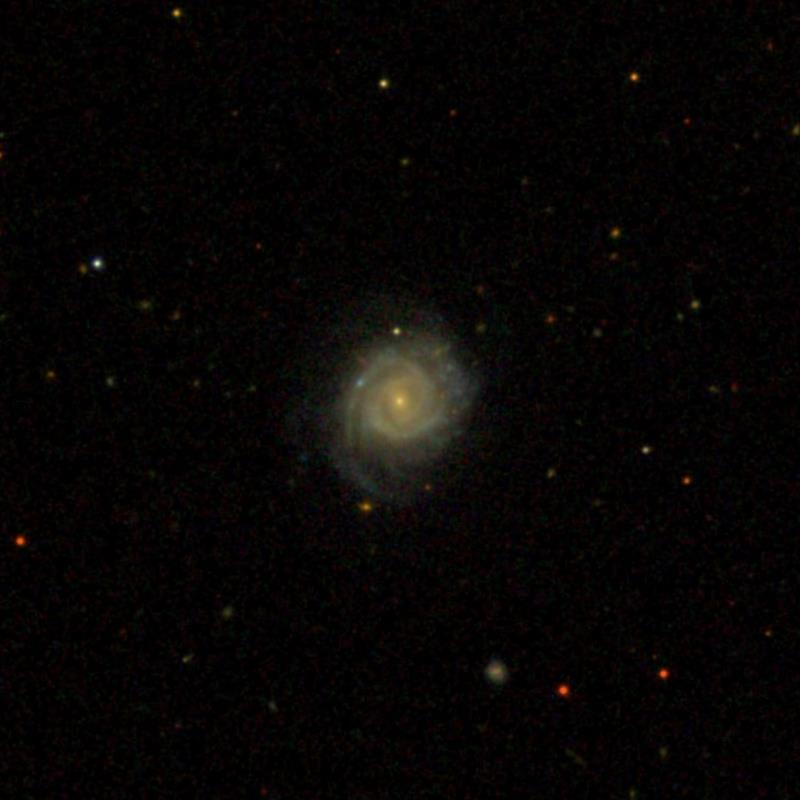

Observation data
- Constellation: Pisces
- Right ascension: 00^{h} 04^{m} 09^{s}
- Declination: +07° 22′ 45″
- Surface brightness: 23.56 mag/arcsec^{2}

Characteristics
- Type: SAc

NGC 7818 is a spiral galaxy located in the constellation Pisces. It is forming a pair with NGC 7816. It was discovered on October 23, 1886 by the astronomer Lewis A. Swift.
