= SN 2013fs =

Supernova located in the spiral galaxy NGC 7610

- Event type: Supernova
- IIP (was IIN )
- Date: October 6, 2013
- Constellation: Pegasus
- Right ascension: 23^{h} 19^{m} 44.67^{s}
- Declination: +10° 11′ 04.5″
- Epoch: J2000
- Galactic coordinates: 089.0254 -46.5583
- Distance: 160 Mly
- Redshift: 0.011855
- Host: NGC 7610
- Progenitor: Unknown
- Progenitor type: Red Supergiant
- Notable features: Earliest detailed observations of a supernova ever made.

SN 2013fs is a supernova, located in the spiral galaxy NGC 7610, discovered by the Intermediate Palomar Transient Factory sky survey at Palomar Observatory on 6 October 2013 (and originally named iPTF 13dqy). It was discovered approximately three hours from explosion (first light) and was observed in ultraviolet and X-ray wavelengths, among others, within several hours. Optical spectra were obtained beginning at six hours from explosion, making these the earliest such detailed observations ever made of a supernova. The supernova was also independently discovered by Kōichi Itagaki on 7 October 2013.

The star that produced SN 2013fs was a red supergiant with a mass 10 times the mass of the Sun, an effective temperature of 3,500 K, a radius 607 times the size of the Sun, and no more than a few million years old when it exploded. The star was surrounded by a relatively dense shell of gas shed by the star within the year before it exploded. Radiation emitted by the supernova explosion illuminated this shell, which had a mass of approximately one-thousandth the mass of the Sun, and its outer fringe was about five times the distance of Neptune from the Sun.
