= NGC 1247 =

Galaxy in the constellation Eridanus

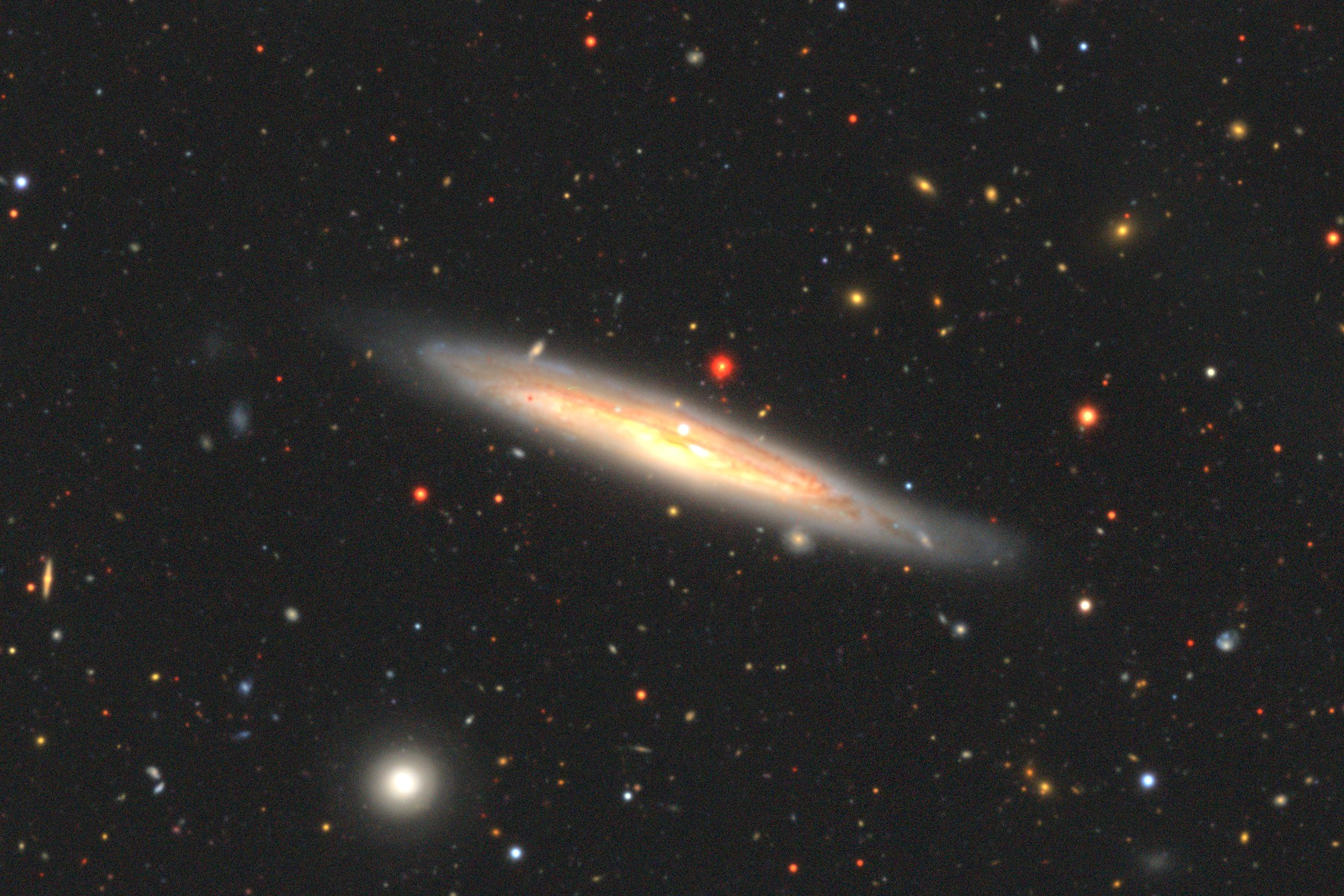
- NGC 1247 (center) and Mrk 1071 (lower left) imaged by Legacy Surveys

Observation data (J2000 epoch)
- Constellation: Eridanus
- Right ascension: 03^{h} 12^{m} 14.2539^{s}
- Declination: −10° 28′ 50.963″
- Redshift: 0.013166±0.0000140
- Heliocentric radial velocity: 3,947±4 km/s
- Distance: 205.85 ± 7.89 Mly (63.113 ± 2.419 Mpc)
- Group or cluster: NGC 1241 group (LGG 84)
- Apparent magnitude (V): 13.47

Characteristics
- Type: Sbc edge-on
- Size: ~251,700 ly (77.17 kpc) (estimated)
- Apparent size (V): 4.59′ × 0.58′

Other designations
- IRAS 03098-1040, 2MASX J03121431-1028520, UGCA 58, MCG -02-09-014, PGC 11931

NGC 1247 is a large edge-on spiral galaxy in the constellation of Eridanus. Its velocity with respect to the cosmic microwave background is 3,774±13 km/s, which corresponds to a Hubble distance of 181.6 ± 12.7 Mly (55.67 ± 3.90 Mpc). However, 16 non-redshift measurements give a farther mean distance of 205.85 ± 7.89 Mly (63.113 ± 2.419 Mpc). It was discovered by German-British astronomer William Herschel on 10 December 1798.

NGC 1247 has a possible active galactic nucleus, i.e. it has a compact region at the center of a galaxy that emits a significant amount of energy across the electromagnetic spectrum, with characteristics indicating that this luminosity is not produced by the stars.

== NGC 1241 group ==
NGC 1247 is a member of the NGC 1241 galaxy group (also known as LGG 84). The other four galaxies in the group are NGC 1241, NGC 1242, Mrk 1071, and MCG-02-09-006

== Supernova ==
One supernova has been observed in NGC 1247:

- SN 2026xqu (Type Ia-pec, mag. 18.28) was discovered by GOTO on 6 August 2026.

== See also ==
- List of NGC objects (1001–2000)
