= NGC 7537 =

Galaxy in the constellation Pisces

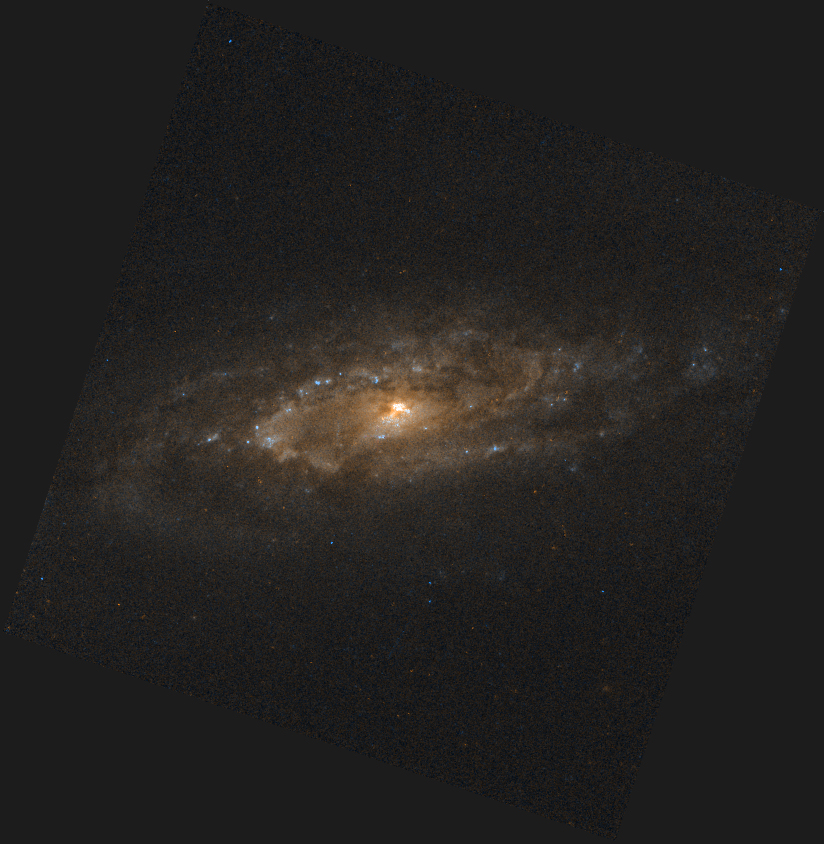
- A Hubble Space Telescope (HST) image of spiral galaxy NGC 7537 core.

Observation data (J2000 epoch)
- Constellation: Pisces
- Right ascension: 23^{h} 14^{m} 34.497^{s}
- Declination: +04° 29′ 54.02″
- Redshift: 0.009633
- Heliocentric radial velocity: 2,888±4 km/s
- Distance: 127 Mly (39 Mpc)
- Group or cluster: Pegasus I
- Apparent magnitude (V): 13.9

Characteristics
- Type: Sbc
- Size: 24 kly (7.5 kpc)
- Apparent size (V): 1′.047 × 0′.356 (NIR)

Other designations
- UGC 12442, PGC 70786

NGC 7537 is a spiral galaxy located in the equatorial constellation of Pisces, about 1.5° to the NNW of Gamma Piscium. It was first documented by German-born astronomer William Herschel on Aug 30, 1785. J. L. E. Dreyer described it as, "very faint, considerably small, round, brighter middle, southwestern of 2". This galaxy lies at a distance of approximately 127 Mly (39 Mpc) from the Milky Way, and is a member of the Pegasus I cluster.

This object forms a pair with the nearly edge-on barred spiral galaxy NGC 7541, and the two show signs of interaction. NGC 7537 has a curved tidal tail to the northeast with a length of 23 kly (6.9 kpc), while NGC 7541 has two tidal tails. They have a projected separation of 140 kly (44 kpc).

== Supernova ==
One supernova has been observed in NGC 7537:

- SN 2002gd (Type II, mag. 16.7) was discovered by Alain Klotz, and independently by Tim Puckett and Alex Langoussis on October 5, 2002. It was positioned 34″ east and 8″ north of the galactic nucleus of NGC 7537.
