= NGC 7626 =

Elliptical Galaxy in the constellation Pegasus

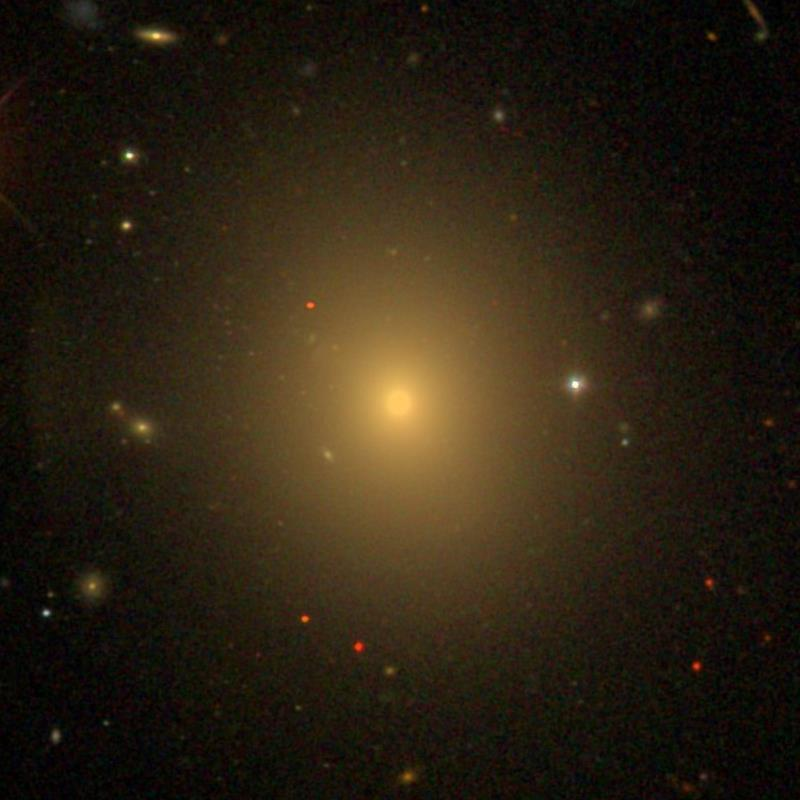
- NGC 7626 as observed by the Sloan Digital Sky Survey

Observation data (J2000 epoch)
- Constellation: Pegasus
- Right ascension: 23^{h} 20^{m} 42.5^{s}
- Declination: +08° 13′ 01″
- Redshift: 0.011358
- Heliocentric radial velocity: 3390 km/s
- Distance: ~160 million
- Group or cluster: Pegasus I Cluster
- Apparent magnitude (B): 12.8
- Magnitude (J): 8.997
- Magnitude (H): 8.271
- Magnitude (K): 8.032

Characteristics
- Type: E pec? LINER
- Size: 86.96 kiloparsec
- Apparent size (V): 2.6′ × 1.8′

Other designations
- UGC 12499, PGC 71019, LEDA 71140

NGC 7626 is an elliptical galaxy located in the constellation Pegasus. It was discovered on September 26, 1785, by the German-British astronomer William Herschel.

The galaxy lies at a distance of approximately 160 million light-years from the Milky Way, based on its redshift. NGC 7626 is classified as a normal elliptical galaxy and is a prominent member of the Pegasus I Group, a small galaxy group dominated by early-type galaxies.

NGC 7626 has been studied in multiple wavelengths, including optical and X-ray observations, which indicate the presence of hot gas typical of massive elliptical galaxies in group environments. NGC 7626 is classified as a radio galaxy and a LINER.

The galaxy is listed in several major astronomical catalogues, including the New General Catalogue, the Uppsala General Catalogue (UGC 12499), and the Principal Galaxies Catalogue (PGC 71019).

NGC 7626 is also part of a galaxy group known as NGC 7619 Group or LGG 473. It consist of at least 23 members, namely NGC 7518, NGC 7562, NGC 7562A, NGC 7557, NGC 7557, NGC 7617, NGC 7604, NGC 7611, NGC 7619, NGC 7631, NGC 7623, NGC 7608, NGC 7623, NGC 7610, NGC 7612, NGC 7648 and IC 1474.
