= NGC 6902 =

Unbarred spiral galaxy in the constellation Sagittarius

- Image of NGC 6902

Observation data (J2000 epoch)
- Constellation: Sagittarius
- Right ascension: 20^{h} 24^{m} 28.067^{s}
- Declination: −43° 39′ 12.42″
- Redshift: 0.009300±0.000023
- Heliocentric radial velocity: 2793.9 km/s
- Distance: 124 Mly (38.0 Mpc)
- Group or cluster: LGG 434
- Apparent magnitude (V): 10.93±0.18
- Apparent magnitude (B): 11.64±0.18

Characteristics
- Type: SA(r)b
- Size: ~334,800 ly (102.64 kpc) (estimated)
- Apparent size (V): 3.55′ × 2.69′

Other designations
- IRAS 20210-4348, F20210-4348, 2MASX J20242813-4339127, Gaia DR2 6678974930431764096, NGC 6902, IC 4948, LEDA 64632, MCG -07-42-002, PGC 64632

NGC 6902 is an unbarred spiral galaxy located in the southern constellation of Sagittarius at an approximate distance of 124 million light-years (38.0 Mpc). NGC 6902 was discovered on September 2, 1836 by English astronomer John Herschel. In his New General Catalogue, Danish astronomer J. L. E. Dreyer described it as faint, considerably small, round, brighter middle. It is a member of the small NGC 6092 group of galaxies; the LGG 434 group.

The morphological classification of NGC 6902 is SA(r)b, indicating an unbarred spiral galaxy (SA) with an inner ring (r) and somewhat tightly wound arms (b). As the two arms extend outward, they transition into a complex system of filamentary arms. The galaxy has an angular size of 3.55′ × 2.69′ in the optical band. The galactic plane is inclined at an angle of 38±5° to the line of sight from the Earth. NGC 6902 has a high abundance of neutral hydrogen; about three times greater than a typical galaxy of this class. The ring structure is undergoing extensive star formation. Although classed as unbarred, there is a small bar of stars inside the ring.

== Supernova ==
One supernova has been observed in NGC 6902:

- SN 2024uwq (Type Ic-BL, mag. 17.38) was discovered by ATLAS on 7 September 2024.

== Gallery ==
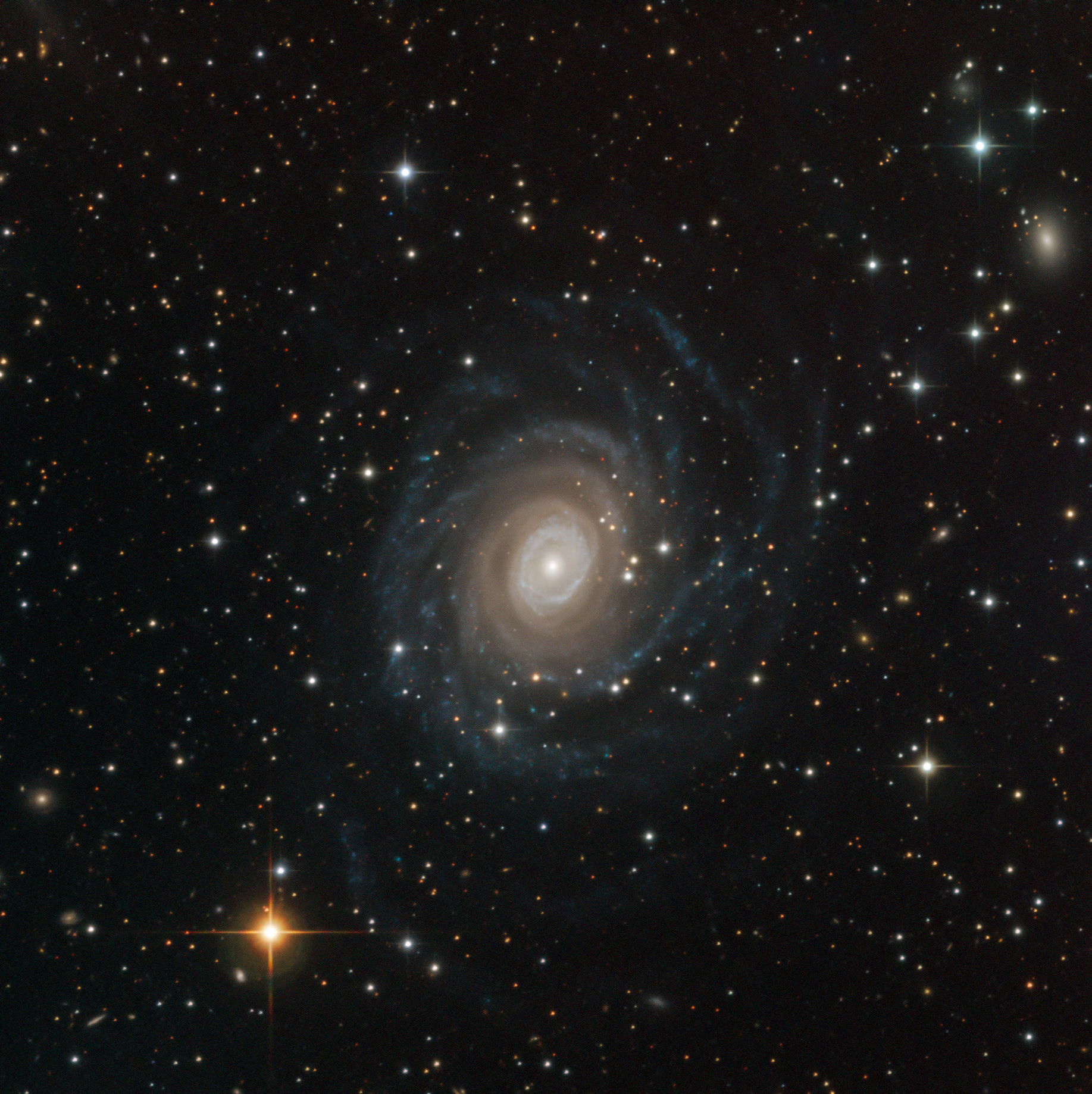
NGC 6902 imaged by SPECULOOS during its first light

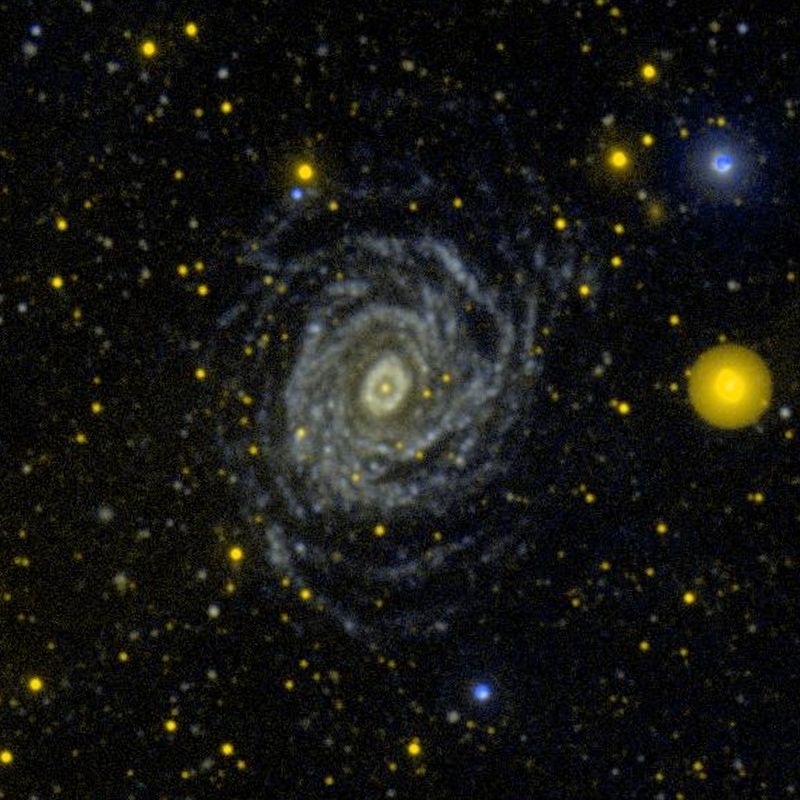
NGC 6902 by GALEX

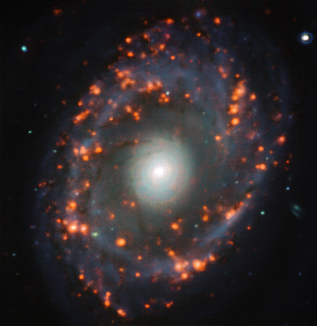
Center of NGC 6902 by Very Large Telescope

== See also ==
- List of NGC objects (6001–7000)
