= NGC 7817 =

NGC object

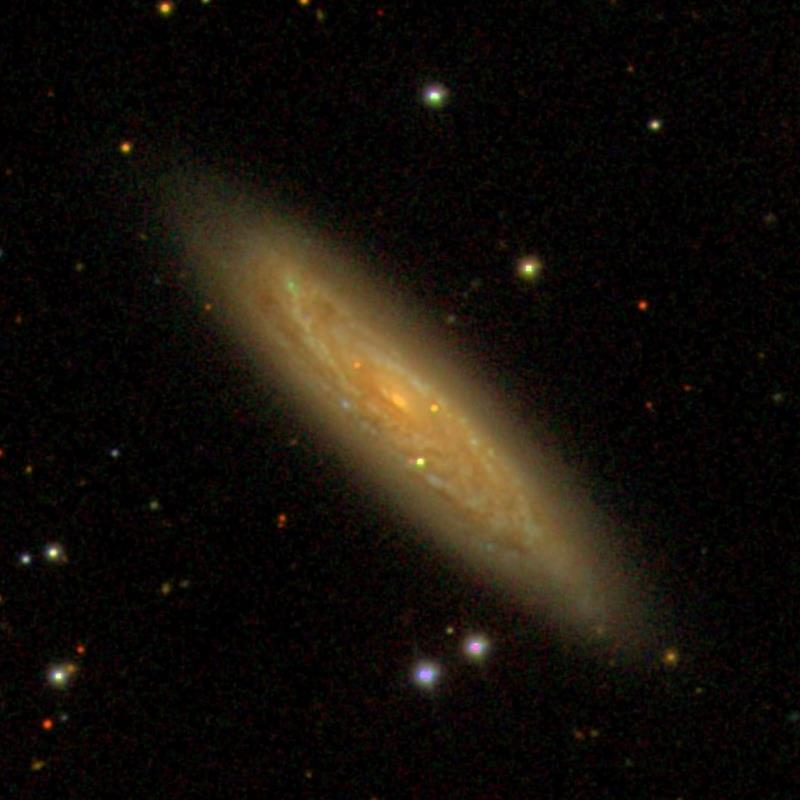

Observation data (J2000 epoch)
- Constellation: Pegasus
- Right ascension: 00 01 24.840
- Declination: +20 28 26.33
- Redshift: 0.007729
- Absolute magnitude (V): 11.94
- Absolute magnitude (B): 12.86
- Magnitude (J): 9.489
- Magnitude (H): 8.734
- Magnitude (K): 8.421

Characteristics
- Type: SA C

NGC 7817 is a spiral galaxy in the constellation Pegasus. It was discovered on September 15, 1784 by the astronomer William Herschel.
