= NGC 7816 =

Galaxy in the constellation Pisces

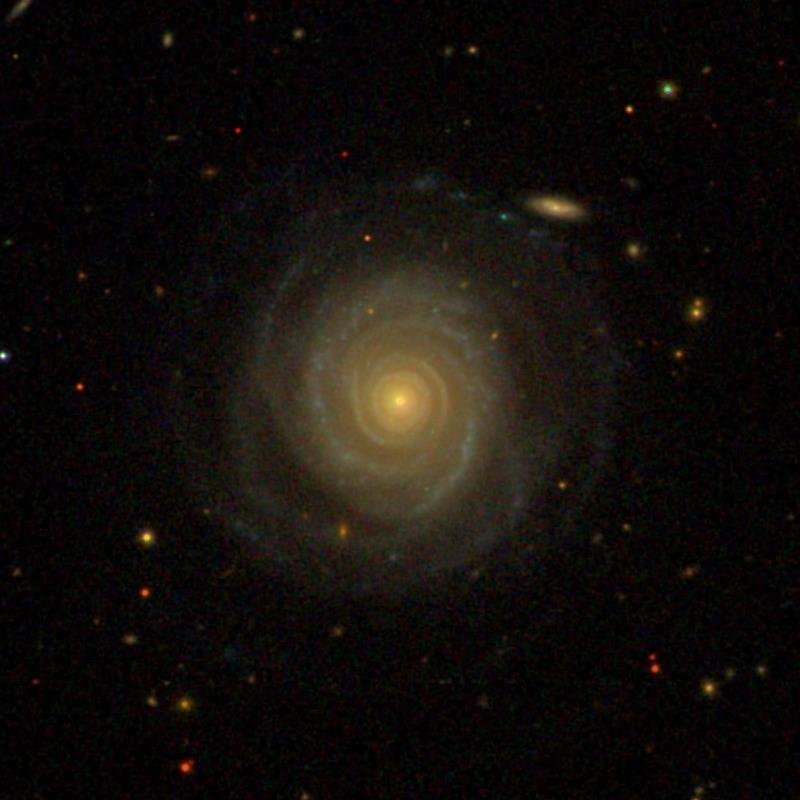
- SDSS image of NGC 7816

Observation data (J2000 epoch)
- Constellation: Pisces
- Right ascension: 00^{h} 03^{m} 48.8^{s}
- Declination: 07° 28′ 43″
- Redshift: 0.017480/5240 km/s
- Distance: 217,249,200 ly
- Apparent magnitude (V): 13.61

Characteristics
- Type: Sbc
- Size: ~ 65,468.34 ly
- Apparent size (V): 1.7 x 1.5

Other designations
- CGCG 408-18, IRAS 00012+0712, MCG+1-1-18, PGC 263, UGC 16

NGC 7816 is a spiral galaxy located about 215 million light-years away in the constellation of Pisces. It was discovered by astronomer William Herschel on September 26, 1785.

One supernovae has been observed in NGC 7816: SN 2017gww (Type II, mag. 17.9) was discovered by Kōichi Itagaki on September 26, 2017.

== Pair with NGC 7818 ==
NGC 7816 is listed as being in pair with the galaxy NGC 7818. NGC 7818 is also listed as being a disturbed member of the pair. However, due to the large difference in their recessional velocities, the two galaxies are not a true pair but an optical double.

== See also ==
- List of NGC objects (7001–7840)
