= NGC 7619 =

Galaxy in the constellation Pegasus

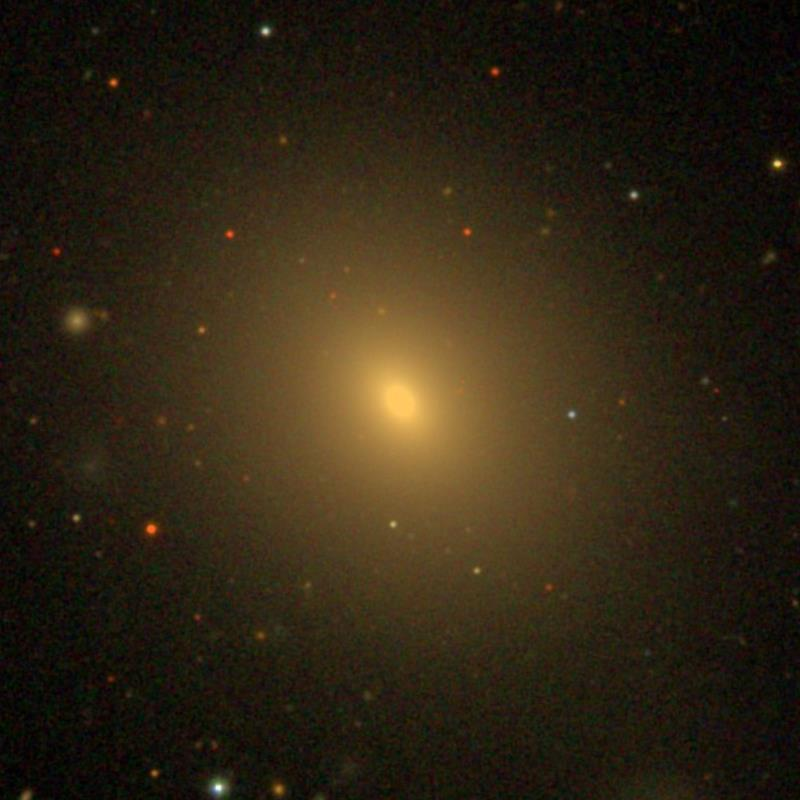
- SDSS image of NGC 7619

Observation data (J2000 epoch)
- Constellation: Pegasus
- Right ascension: 23^{h} 17^{m} 14.524^{s}
- Declination: +08° 12′ 22.63″
- Redshift: 0.01324
- Heliocentric radial velocity: 3,944 km/s
- Distance: 53.813 ± 1.963 Megaparsec
- Group or cluster: Pegasus I Cluster
- Apparent magnitude (B): 12.7
- Magnitude (J): 8.992
- Magnitude (H): 8.357
- Magnitude (K): 8.033

Characteristics
- Type: E2
- Size: 87.76 kiloparsec

Other designations
- UGC 12523, MCG +01-59-052, PGC 71121

NGC 7619 is an elliptical galaxy located in the constellation Pegasus. NGC 7619 and NGC 7626 are the dominant and brightest members of the Pegasus galaxy cluster. Both of them were discovered by William Herschel on September 26, 1785.

The radial velocity of this galaxy was measured in 1929 and found to be double that of any galaxy observed at that time. The measurement was consistent with the extrapolated value predicted by Edwin Hubble; a distance-velocity relation that would later become known as Hubble's law.

NGC 7619 is also part of a galaxy group known as NGC 7619 Group or LGG 473. It consist of at least 23 members, namely NGC 7518, NGC 7562, NGC 7562A, NGC 7557, NGC 7557, NGC 7617, NGC 7604, NGC 7611, NGC 7626, NGC 7623, NGC 7608, NGC 7623, NGC 7610, NGC 7612, NGC 7648 and IC 1474.

== Supernova ==
One supernova has been observed in NGC 7619: SN 1970J (Type Ia, mag. 14.5) was discovered by Leonida Rosino on 24 September 1970.

== See also ==
- List of NGC objects (7001–7840)
- NGC 7611
- NGC 7610
