= NGC 7617 =

Lenticular Galaxy in the constellation Pegasus

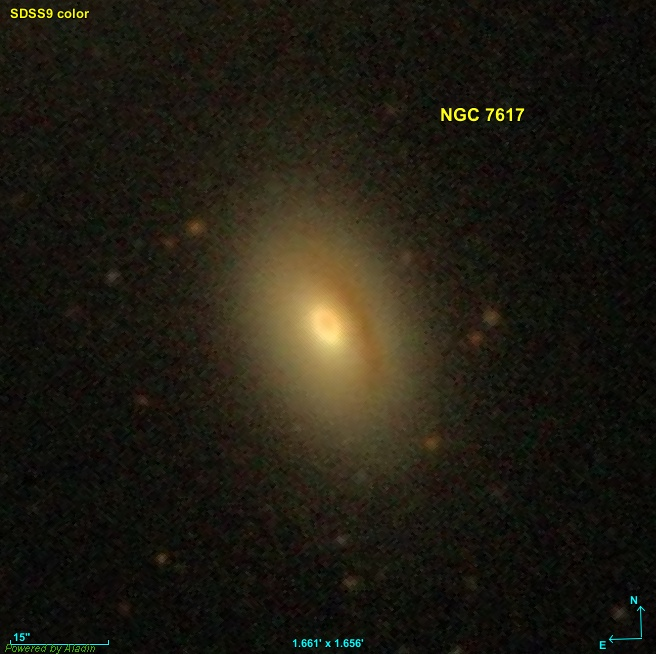
- NGC 7617 image by SDSS

Observation data (J2000 epoch)
- Constellation: Pegasus
- Right ascension: 23^{h} 20^{m} 08.9733^{s}
- Declination: +08° 09′ 56.636″
- Redshift: 0.013916
- Heliocentric radial velocity: 4341 km/s
- Distance: 183 Mly
- Group or cluster: WBL 710 Group
- Apparent magnitude (B): 15.1
- Magnitude (J): 11.470
- Magnitude (H): 10.693
- Magnitude (K): 10.385

Characteristics
- Type: SA0^0?
- Size: 43.3 kiloparsec

Other designations
- NGC 7617, UGC 12523 NOTES01, CGCG 406-072, CGCG 2317.6+0753, MCG +01-59-051a

NGC 7617 is a lenticular galaxy located in the constellation of Pegasus. Its velocity relative to the cosmic microwave background is 3,801 ± 27 km/s, which corresponds to a Hubble distance of 56.1 ± 4.0 Mpc (~183 million light- years). NGC 7617 was discovered by the Prussian astronomer Heinrich Louis d'Arrest in 1864.

== WBL 710 Group ==
A catalogue of 732 galaxy groups, closely spaced and with few members, was published in May 1999 by Richard A. White, Mark Bliton, Suketu P. Bhavsar, Patricia Bornmann, Jack O. Burns, Michael J. Ledlow and Christen Loken.

According to White et al., WBL 710 comprises six galaxies, namely NGC 7617, NGC 7619, NGC 7626, NGC 7631, PGC 71155 and PGC 71159. A.M. Garcia places the galaxies NGC 7619, NGC 7626, and NGC 7631 in the NGC 7619 group. Levy et al. also place NGC 7631, PGC 71159, and PGC 71155 in this same group. According to Chandreyee Sengupta et al., the galaxies NGC 7619, NGC 7626, NGC 7631, and PGC 71159 are X-ray emitters and are members of the NGC 7619 group. The table below summarizes the properties of these six galaxies. All of these galaxies are in the constellation Pisces, except for NGC 7516, which is in the constellation Pegasus.
