= NGC 7469 =

Galaxy located in the constellation Pegasus

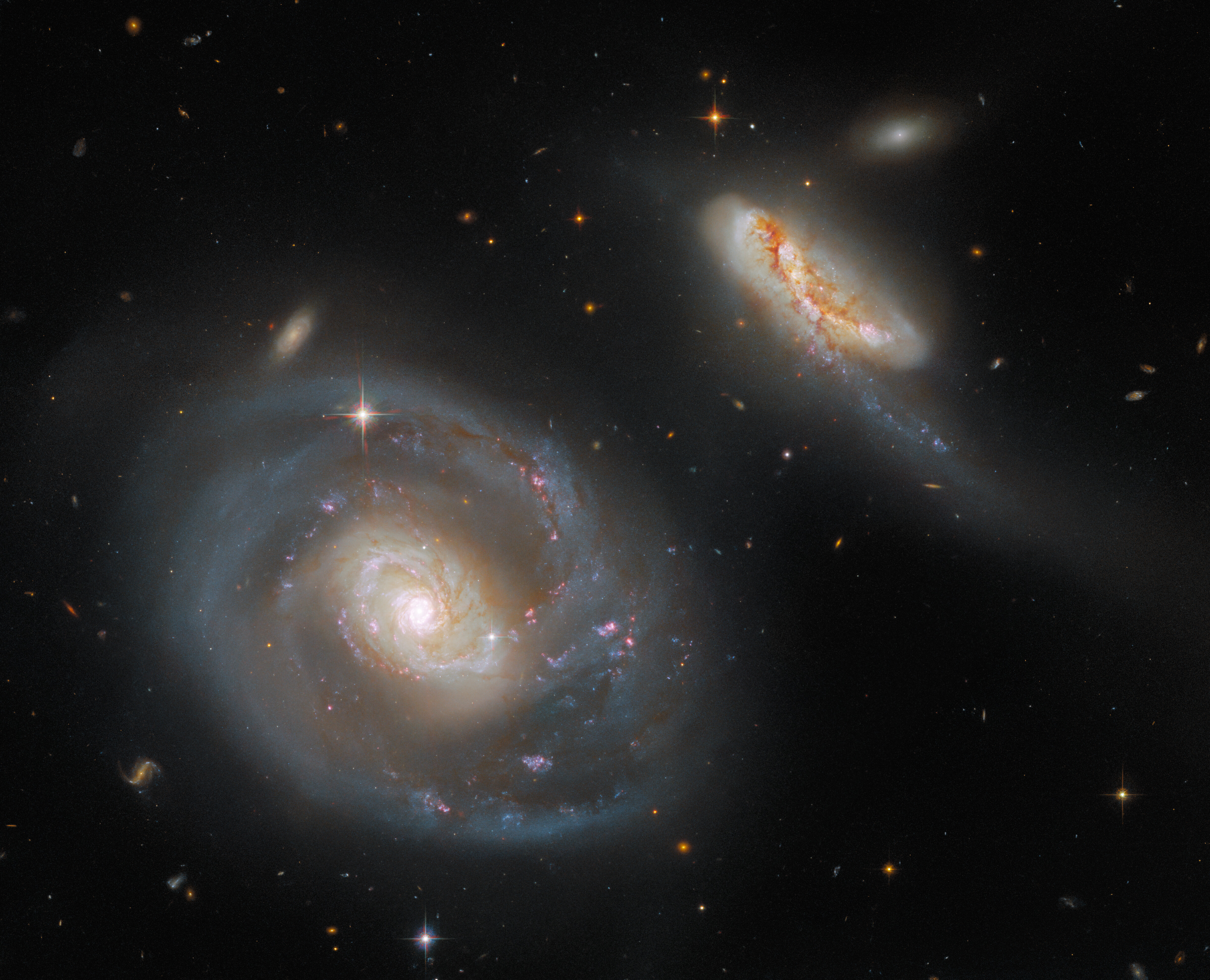
- NGC 7469 (lower left) and IC 5283 (upper right) imaged by the Hubble Space Telescope

Observation data (J2000 epoch)
- Constellation: Pegasus
- Right ascension: 23^{h} 03^{m} 15.6^{s}
- Declination: +08° 42′ 26″
- Redshift: 0.016317 ± 0.000007
- Heliocentric radial velocity: 4,892 ± 2 km/s
- Distance: 195 ± 65.6 Mly (60.0 ± 20.1 Mpc)
- Apparent magnitude (V): 12.3

Characteristics
- Type: (R')SAB(rs)a
- Size: 142,050 ly (43.57 kpc) (estimated)
- Apparent size (V): 1.5′ × 1.1′
- Notable features: Seyfert galaxy

Other designations
- UGC 12332, Arp 298, Mrk 1514, MCG +01-58-025, PGC 70348

NGC 7469 is an intermediate spiral galaxy in the constellation of Pegasus. NGC 7469 is located about 200 million light-years away from Earth, which means, given its apparent dimensions, that NGC 7469 is approximately 142,000 light-years across. It was discovered by German-British astronomer William Herschel on November 12, 1784.

NGC 7469 is a type I Seyfert galaxy, characterised by its bright nucleus. It is also a luminous infrared source with a powerful starburst embedded into its circumnuclear region. The coexistence of a circumnuclear starburst ring and an active galactic nucleus have turned NGC 7469 into a key target for studying their relation. NGC 7469 interacts with its smaller companion IC 5283, forming a pair collectively known in the Atlas of Peculiar Galaxies as Arp 298. NGC 7469 is one of the first galaxies observed by the James Webb Space Telescope.

== Characteristics ==
=== Active galactic nucleus ===
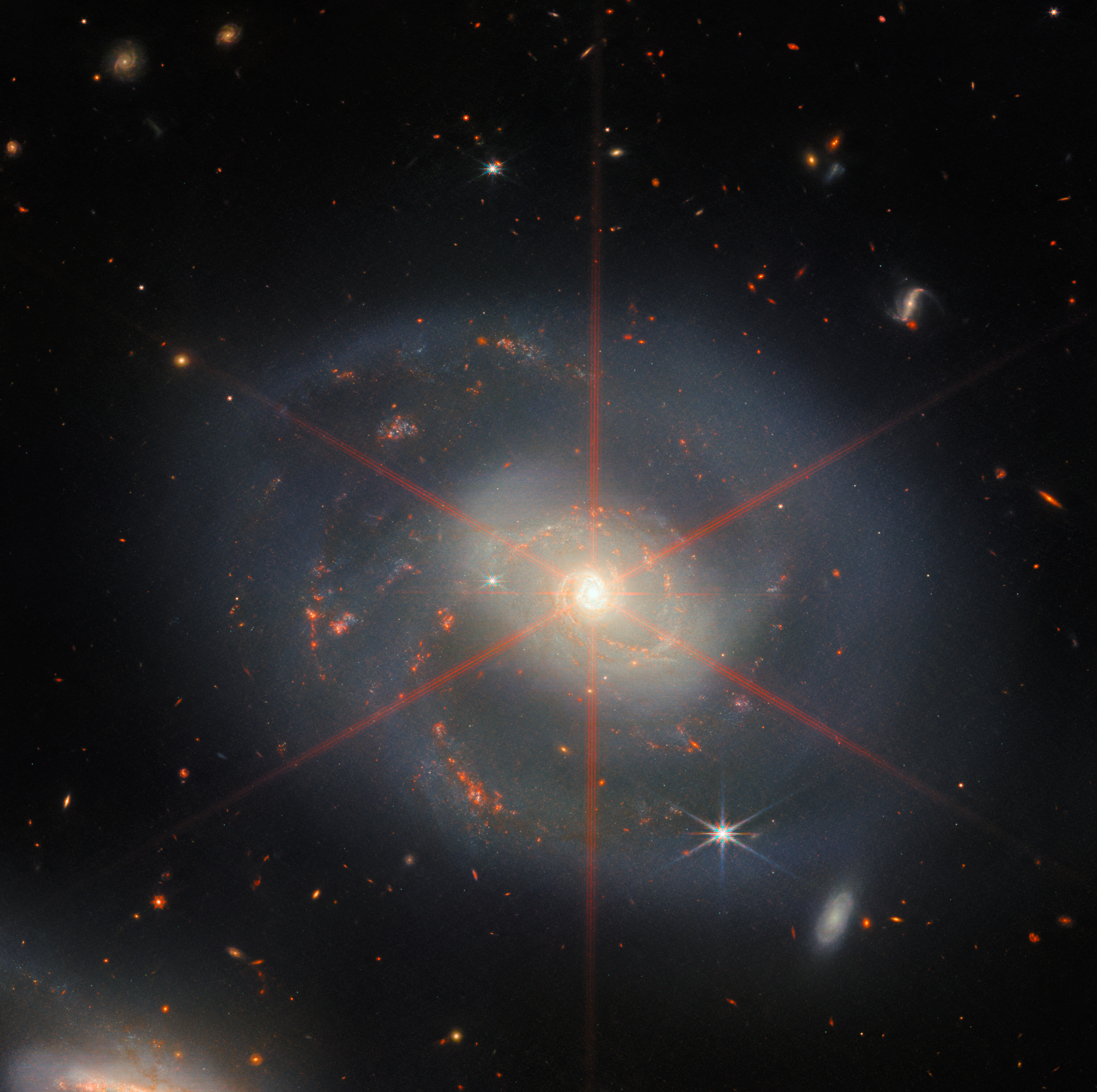
NGC 7469 as imaged by the James Webb Space Telescope. The bright nucleus has caused a diffraction spike that looks like a six-pointed star.

NGC 7469 is a type 1.2 Seyfert galaxy and one of the most well studied Seyfert galaxies. In 1943, this galaxy was one of six nebulae listed by American astronomer Carl K. Seyfert that showed broad emission lines in their nuclei. Members of this class of objects became known as Seyfert galaxies, and they were noted to have a higher than normal surface brightness in their nuclei. NGC 7469 was also noted to have very broad hydrogen lines. Type 1 Seyfert galaxies are identified as having broad emission lines and being radio-quiet active galactic nuclei (AGN) in the unified scheme suggested in the 1990s.

The most accepted theory for the energy source of AGNs is the presence of an accretion disk around a supermassive black hole. In the case of NGC 7469 the mass of the circumnuclear gas disk is nearly equal to that of the accretion disk. NGC 7469 is believed to host a supermassive black hole whose mass is estimated to be (12.2±1.4)×10^{6} M_{☉} based on broad emission-line reverberation mapping or 6460000 M_{☉} as measured based on velocity dispersion. Around the black hole there is a dust torus lying at a distance of 65-87 light days, based on K-band lag times.

The light curves of NGC 7469 feature variability, a phenomenon common among Seyfert galaxies, with significant variability along its spectrum. Various studies have monitored its X-ray, UV and optical spectrum for several months. A more long-term study of the variability was published in 2017, after monitoring the optical spectrum of NGC 7469 from 1996 to 2015. Maximum activity was observed in 1998, while several flare-likes events lasting 1–5 days took also place. The variability of the spectrum seems to have two periods of around 1200 and 2600 days. There were also observed time-lags, which were nearly 21 days for Hβ, 3 days for Ha, and 3 days for HeII.

It has been observed in the X-ray and ultraviolet that there is an outflow of ionised gas from the region of the nucleus. The total output of the outflow is estimated to be 0.06 M_{☉} per year. Based on the spectrum of the outflow, it is composed of two elements, one with a velocity of 580–720 km/s and high ionisation and one with a velocity of 2300 km/s and lower ionisation. The location of the faster gas is from the space between the supermassive black hole and the inner part of the torus and it may be wind produced from the torus. The low velocity gas is a highly ionized, high-density absorber, located near the broad emission-line region. Its total column density is calculated to be 10^{20} per square centimetre.

Genzel et al. detected a 1.5 arcsecond ridge of blueshifted, radially streaming gas emanating southward from the nucleus, that can also be spotted in radio waves. It could be gas outflowing from the nucleus or material channeled from the ring to the nucleus. A small radio cone was also observed by Lonsdale et al.. They observed three spatially close sources in the nucleus, that may be explained as the nucleus with two radio jets in both sides emerging from the mid infrared disk.

=== Starburst ring ===
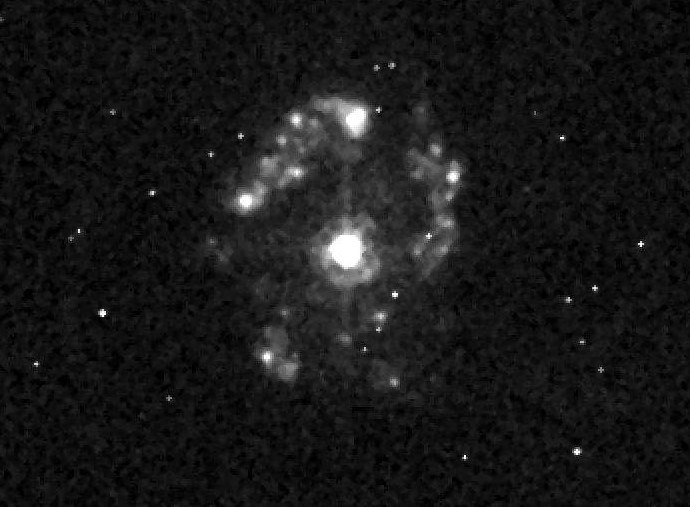
The circumnuclear starburst ring by Hubble Space Telescope.

Around the nucleus has been observed a ring of intense star formation. Its emission was first detected in radio waves by Ulvestad et al. in 1981 and has then been observed in infrared, and optical wavelengths. The ring accounts for up to two-thirds of the galaxy's bolometric luminosity (3×10^{11} L_{☉}). The ring has a radius of 1".5 from the nucleus (500 pc). The intense star formation in NGC 7469 may be a result of the interaction with IC 5283 and the presence of a small bar, however it is caused by local gravitational instabilities and not non-circular motions. The star formation rate in the galaxy is estimated to be between 40 and 80 M_{☉}/year.

The ring was observed in great detail by the Hubble Space Telescope. About 30 star clusters were observed, with masses ranging from 0.5 to over 10 million M_{☉}, fitting the definition of super star clusters. Such massive star clusters have been observed in other starburst and luminous infrared galaxies too. Further examination of the properties of the clusters revealed they group in two populations, a population of intermediate age (~9–20 Myr) and less obscured (AV ≈ 1 mag) star clusters, accounting for the 75% of the total population, and a population of young (1–3 Myr) and extinct (AV ≈ 3 mag) star clusters. The young stars account for about the one other of the mass of the ring and most of the infrared luminosity. Their location is marked by mid infrared and radio waves peaks, with the two brightest coinciding spatially with the ends of the nuclear molecular gas bar. The total stellar mass of the ring was estimated not to exceed 3.5 billion M_{☉}.

=== Other characteristics ===
Observations in the millimetre wavelengths produced a CO 2-1 map, which featured a partial ring or spiral arms at a radius of 1."5–2."5 (500-800 parsec at the distance of NGC 7469), with a bar-like structure connecting them to the central source. In the centre of the galaxy has been resolved in the 2.3 μm C0 2-0 band a nuclear star cluster, which measures 0."15-0."25 across. It has asymmetric shape and its age is less than 60 million years. It accounts for 20%–30% of the nuclear K-band light and about 10% of the nuclear bolometric luminosity.

Aside the circumnuclear starburst ring, NGC 7469 features an inner spiral structure, about 33 arcseconds in diameter and a fainter outer ring, with a diameter of approximately 100 arcseconds. In Hα imaging, a number of star producing H II regions have been observed in the north arm of NGC 7469 but none at the south one, most likely due to the interaction with IC 5283.

== Supernovae ==
Two supernovae have been detected in NGC 7469:

- SN 2000 ft is the first radio supernova detected in the circumnuclear starburst of a luminous infrared Seyfert 1 galaxy, about 600 parsecs from its nucleus. Its evolution features characteristics of radio supernovae identified as Type II supernovae. A visual counterpart was detected in images by the Hubble Space Telescope taken on May 13, 2000, at visual magnitude 19.2. Based on the rate of starburst activity in NGC 7469 it has been calculated that the core collapse supernova rate should be 0.8 supernova per year. However, observations of the circumnuclear ring of the galaxy in radiowaves failed to observe another radio supernova between 1998 and 2006, other than SN 2000 ft. A possible reason is that most core collapse supernovae are radio quiet and cannot be detected against the galactic background emission (SN 2000 ft had strong radio waves emission).
- SN 2008ec (Type Ia, mag. 17.6) was discovered by the Lick Observatory Supernova Search (LOSS) on 14 July 2008.

== Nearby galaxies ==
NGC 7469 forms a pair with its smaller companion IC 5283, a spiral galaxy with no nuclear activity 1'4 away. The tidal interaction between the two galaxies has created a prominent tail to the northeast and enhanced star formation on the eastern side as seen with Hα imaging of IC 5283 and is likely the cause of the star formation in NGC 7469. A gas bridge has been detected between the two galaxies in HI imaging and there is evidence that NGC 7469 is drawing gas from the disk of IC 5283. The galaxy pair is isolated.

It has been suggested that the pair is an outlying member of the Pegasus I galaxy cluster, whose most prominent members are the elliptical galaxies NGC 7619, and NGC 7626. However, based on redshift, they belong to a galaxy group lying behind the cluster. Other members of this group include the disk galaxies NGC 7511, NGC 7515, NGC 7529, NGC 7535, NGC 7536, NGC 7570, NGC 7580, and NGC 7591. The group may be associated with the Perseus–Pisces Supercluster.
