= NGC 7611 =

Lenticular Galaxy in the constellation Pisces

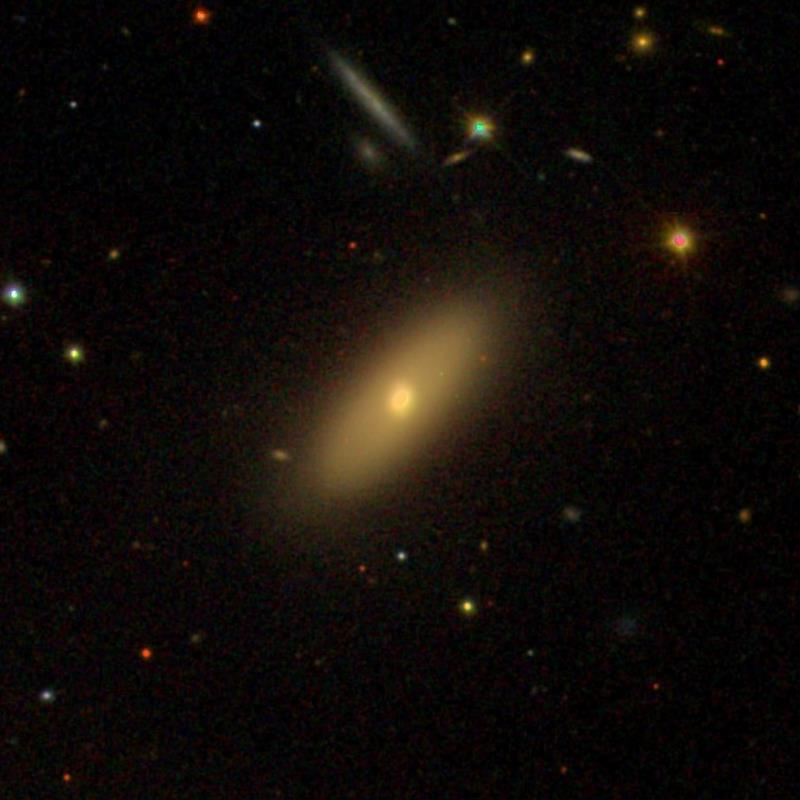
- Image of NGC 7611

Observation data (J2000 epoch)
- Constellation: Pisces
- Right ascension: 23^{h} 19^{m} 36.5932^{s}
- Declination: +08° 03′ 48.017″
- Redshift: 0.010848
- Heliocentric radial velocity: 3299 km/s
- Distance: 139 Mly
- Group or cluster: LGG 473
- Apparent magnitude (B): 14.0
- Magnitude (J): 10.265
- Magnitude (H): 9.618
- Magnitude (K): 9.315

Characteristics
- Type: SB0^+?
- Size: 45.26 kiloparsec

Other designations
- NGC 7611, UGC 12509, CGCG 406-066, CGCG 2317.1+0746, MCG +01-59-049, LEDA 71083

NGC 7611 is a lenticular galaxy located in the constellation of Pisces. Its velocity relative to the cosmic microwave background is 2,881 ± 32 km/s, which corresponds to a Hubble distance of 42.5 ± 3.0 Mpc (~139 million light- years). NGC 7611 was discovered by the Prussian astronomer Heinrich Louis d'Arrest on September 21, 1862

== NGC 7619 Group ==
According to A.M. Garcia, NGC 7611 is a member of the NGC 7619 group. He states that this group of galaxies contains at least 25 members. However, according to a more recent article published by Levy and colleagues in 2007, Some galaxies included by Garcia are also part of a group of galaxies located in the center of the Pegasus I cluster. According to the article, this group contains 30 galaxies. The galaxy NGC 7611 is on Garcia's list. Sengupta et al. also mention this group in an article published in 2006. They include only 17 galaxies, all X-ray emitters, including NGC 7611, but these are found either in Garcia's list or Levy's list, and often in both, with the exception of KUG 2318+079B. The galaxy CGCG 406-086 is another designation for KUG 2318+079B, which is in Levy's list. Similarly, the designation Z406-086 is the galaxy CGCG 406-086. Adding the galaxy KUG 2318+079B brings the total to at least 43 members for this group. However, the galaxy designated as [OB97] P05-6 in Levy's list is not found in any of the sources consulted. The calculation of the group's average distance therefore took into account 42 galaxies. Abraham Mahtessian also mentions the existence of this group, but all the galaxies he includes in it are also in Garcia's list.
