= NGC 7448 =

Galaxy in the constellation of Pegasus

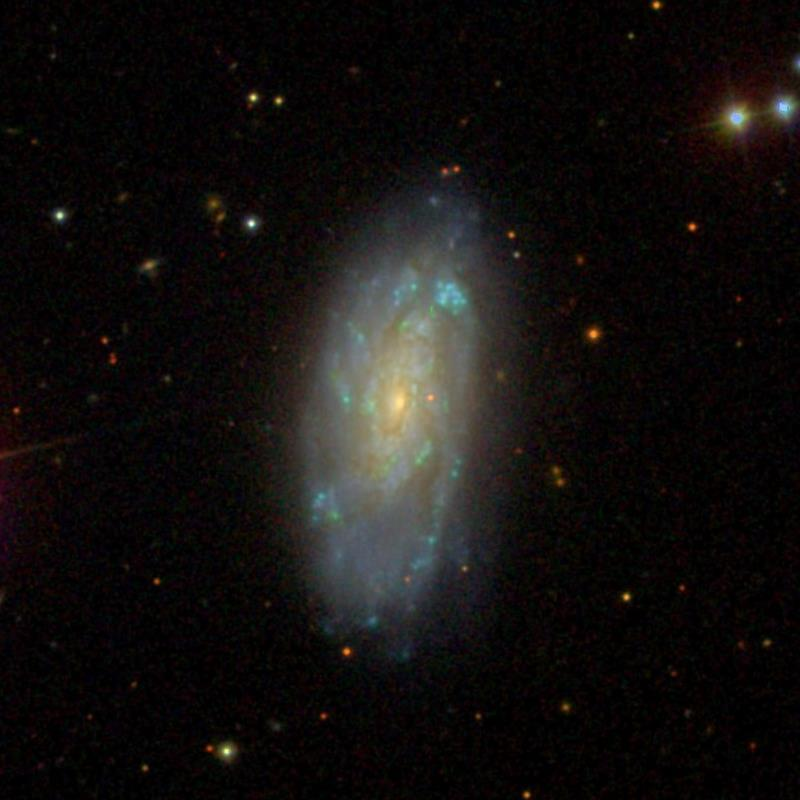
- NGC 7448 (SDSS DR14)

Observation data (J2000 epoch)
- Constellation: Pegasus
- Right ascension: 23^{h} 00^{m} 03.6^{s}
- Declination: +15° 58′ 49″
- Redshift: 0.007318 ± 0.000003
- Heliocentric radial velocity: 2194 ± 1 km/s
- Distance: 79.5 ± 22.9 Mly (24.4 ± 7.0 Mpc)
- Apparent magnitude (V): 11.4

Characteristics
- Type: SA(rs)bc
- Apparent size (V): 2.7′ × 1.2′

Other designations
- UGC 12294, Arp 13, MCG +03-58-018, PGC 70213

NGC 7448 is a spiral galaxy located in the constellation Pegasus. It is located at a distance of circa 80 million light years from Earth, which, given its apparent dimensions, means that NGC 7448 is about 60,000 light years across. It was discovered by William Herschel on October 16, 1784. It is included in the Atlas of Peculiar Galaxies in the category galaxies with detached segments.

NGC 7448 features an inner disk region of tightly wound spiral fragments with high surface brightness. At the edge of this region the surface brightness decreases abruptly. At the outer part of the disk individual arm segments and dust lanes can be discerned. The outer arms feature HII regions. One HII region complex located at the northwest portion of the disk is as bright as the bulge.

NGC 7448 belongs to a galaxy group known as the NGC 7448 group. Other members of the group are the galaxies NGC 7437, NGC 7454, NGC 7463, NGC 7464, and NGC 7465. The last three form a compact subgroup and there is evidence that NGC 7464 and NGC 7465 are in the process of merging. NGC 7479 lies a bit further to the south, and may be part of the group. There is a tail of HI gas extending from NGC 7448 and a stream of gas extending from NGC 7464/65 to NGC 7448.

== Supernovae ==
Three supernovae have been observed in NGC 7448:

- SN 1980L (type unknown, mag. 13.5) was discovered by Raguli Inasaridze on 8 October 1980.
- SN 1997dt (Type Ia, mag. 15.3) was discovered by the BAO Supernova Survey on 22 November 1997.
- SN 2022wsp (Type II, mag. 17.079) was discovered by the Distance Less Than 40 Mpc Survey (DLT40) on 2 October 2022.

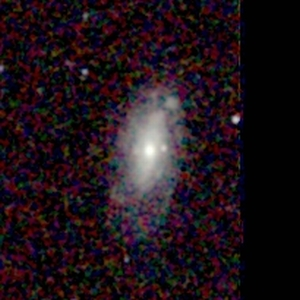
NGC 7448 (2MASS)
