= NGC 7463 =

Galaxy in the constellation Pegasus

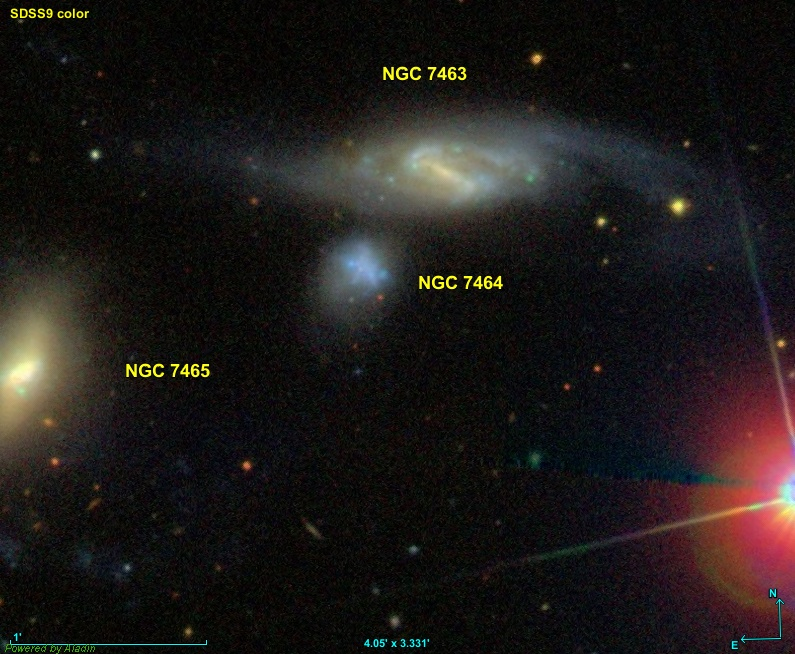
- Image of NGC 7463 with the nearby galaxy and nearby A-type star HD 217602 on the lower right

Observation data (J2000 epoch)
- Constellation: Pegasus
- Right ascension: 23^{h} 01^{m} 51.9576^{s}
- Declination: +15° 58′ 54.753″
- Redshift: 0.007822 ± 0.000007
- Heliocentric radial velocity: 2,345 ± 2

Characteristics
- Type: SABb? pec

Other designations
- UGC 12316, KUG 2259+157A, CGCG 453-048, CGCG 2259.3+1543

NGC 7463 is a peculiar intermediate spiral galaxy, located in the constellation of Pegasus. Its velocity relative to the cosmic microwave background is 1979 ± 26 km/s, which corresponds to a Hubble distance of 29.2 ± 2.1 Mpc (~95.2 million light- years). NGC 7463 was discovered by the German-British astronomer William Herschel in 1784.

== NGC 7448 group ==
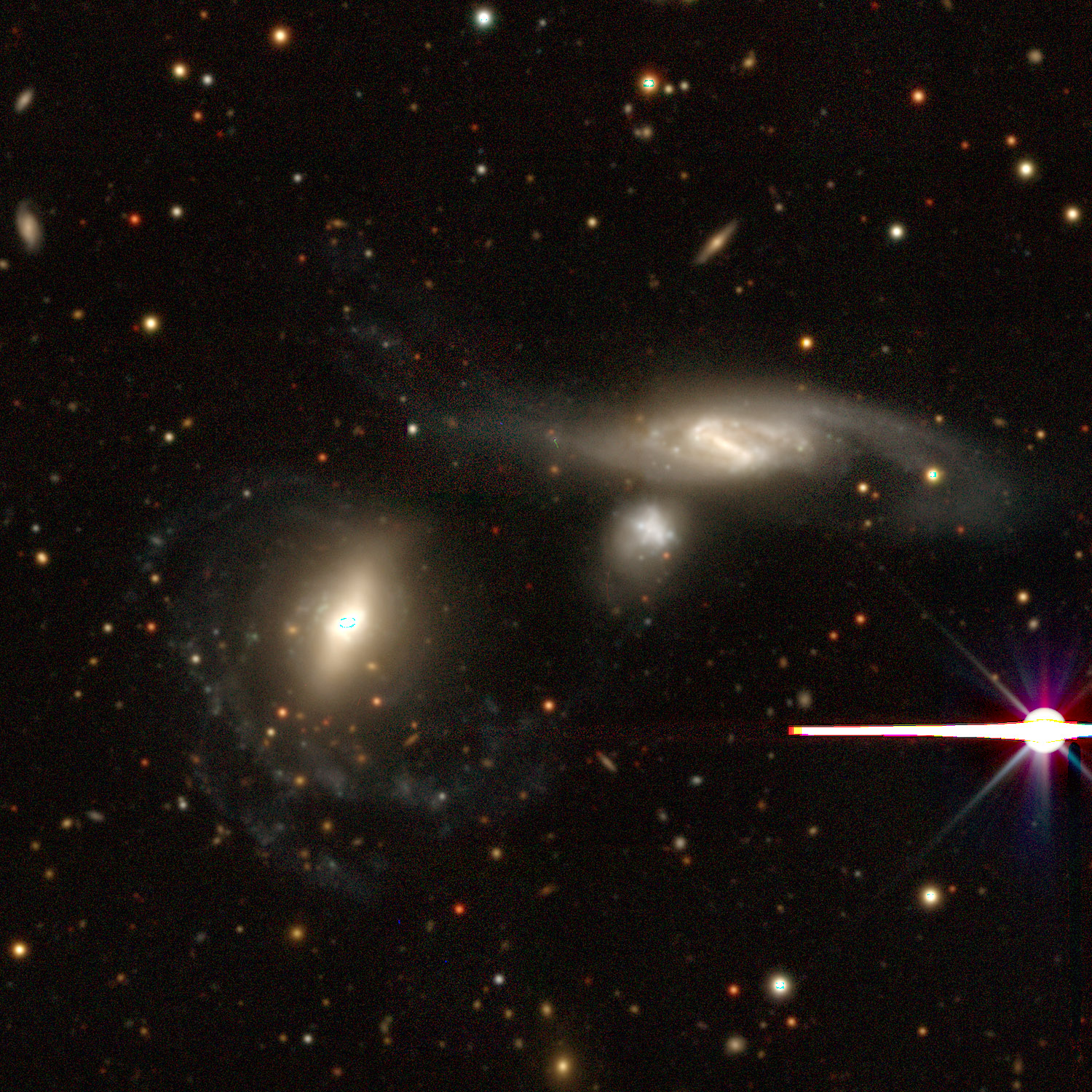
Galaxy Triplets in DESI Survey

According to two publications from 1991 and 1992, NGC 7463 is a member of the NGC 7448 group, a group of galaxies. Given that NGC 7463 likely forms a system of galaxies gravitationally interacting with its neighbors, members of the NGC 7448 group, it is therefore probable that it also belongs to this group. Furthermore, in an article published in 1998, the Armenian astronomer Abraham Mahtessian also includes NGC 7463 in the same group as NGC 7468.

According to AM Garcia, the NGC 7448 group contains at least 8 members, namely NGC 7448, NGC 7454, NGC 7464, NGC 7465, NGC 7468, UGC 12313, UGC 12321 and UGC 12350.

In an article published in 2006 Chandreyee Sengupta and Ramesh Balasubramanyam also mention the NGC 7448 group with the same galaxies as Garcia, and NGC 7463 is not found there. All the galaxies in this group are weak X-ray emitters.

=== Galaxy triplets ===
NGC 7463 forms a triplet of galaxies with NGC 7464 and NGC 7465. The three galaxies probably interact with each other, causing remarkable distortions within their structure. In addition, the galaxy UGC 12313, located further north, also appears to interact with the group.

However, there is a difference of approximately 7.1 Mpc (~23.2 million ly) between NGC 7463 and NGC 7464, as well as a difference of approximately 5.4 Mpc (~17.6 million ly) with NGC 7465. It is therefore doubtful that NGC 7463 forms a true triplet of galaxies with its two other neighbors, and the same applies to its membership in the group of NGC 7448, whose average distance is equal to 25.0 ± 1.6 Mpc (~81.5 million ly).
