= NGC 7454 =

Galaxy in the constellation Pegasus

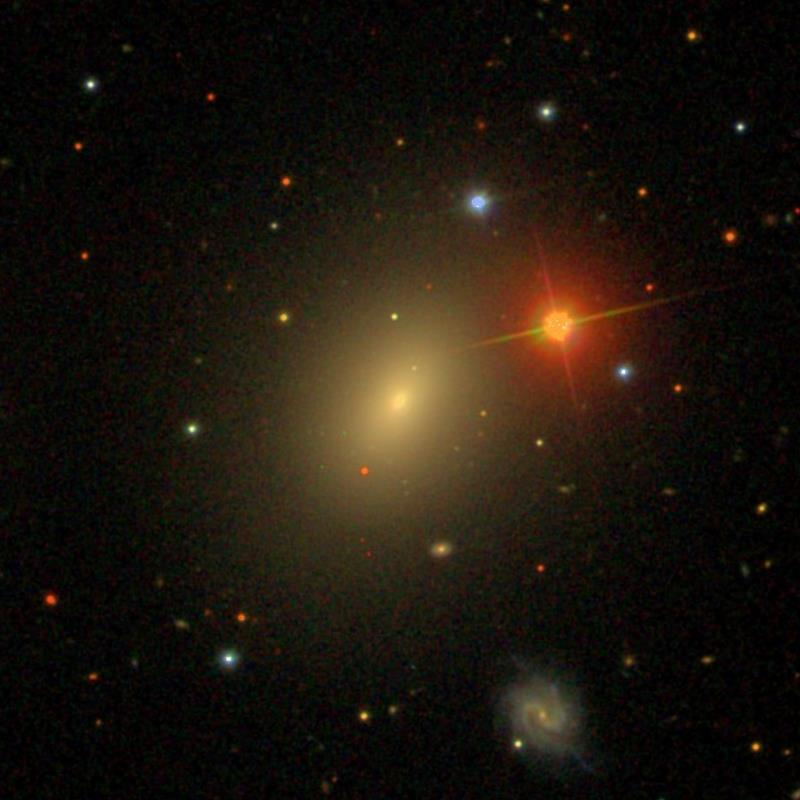
- SDSS image of NGC 7454

Observation data (J2000 epoch)
- Constellation: Pegasus
- Right ascension: 23^{h} 01^{m} 06.512^{s}
- Declination: +16° 23′ 18.48″
- Redshift: 2,008 km/s
- Distance: 77.17 ± 0.46 Mly (23.66 ± 0.14 Mpc)
- Apparent magnitude (V): 11.8

Characteristics
- Type: E4
- Apparent size (V): 2.1′ × 1.4′

Other designations
- NGC 7454, UGC 12305, LEDA 70264

NGC 7454 is an elliptical galaxy in the constellation Pegasus. It was discovered on October 15, 1784 by William Herschel. This object has an apparent visual magnitude of 11.8, a visual size of 2.1′ × 1.4′, and a morphological classification of E4. J. L. E. Dreyer described the galaxy as F, cS, lE, lbM, *11 p 1', which indicates it is faint, considerably small, a little extended, with a little brighter middle, and an 11th magnitude star is located 1 arcmin to west.
