= List of ring galaxies =

Astronomical objects

This is a list of ring galaxies. A ring galaxy, as the name suggests, is a disc or spiral galaxy with its galactic disc structured or distorted into a ring or torus-like appearance. Hoag's Object, discovered by Art Hoag in 1950, is the prototypical example of a ring galaxy.

== Formation theories ==
Ring galaxies are theorized to be formed in various possible ways:

1. Bar instability: this occurs when the rotational velocity of the bar in a barred spiral galaxy increases to the point of spiral spin-out. Under typical conditions, gravitational density waves would favor the creation of spiral arms. When bar instability occurs, these density waves are instead forced out into a ring-structure by the pressure, force, and gravitational influence of the baryronic and dark matter furiously orbiting rapidly around the bar. This migration forces the stars, gas and dust found within the former arms into a torus-like region, forming a ring, and often igniting star formation.
2. Galactic collisions: another process by which ring galaxies are observed to form is by the collision of two or more galaxies. The Cartwheel Galaxy, galaxy pair AM 2026-424, and Arp 147 are all examples of ring galaxies believed to have been formed from this process. In pass-through galactic collisions, an (often smaller) galaxy will pass through the disc of another spiral, causing an outward push of the arms, as if dropping a rock into a pond of still water. In sideswipe and head-on collisions, the emergence of a perfect ring is less likely, with chaotic and warped appearances dominating.
3. Intergalactic medium accretion: this method has been inferred through the existence of Hoag's object, along with UV observations of several other large and ultra-large super spiral galaxies and current formation theories of spiral galaxies. UV-light observations show several cases of faint, ring-like and spiral structures of hot young stars that have formed along the network of cooled inflowing gas, extending far from the visible luminous galactic disc. If conditions are favorable, a ring can form in the place of a spiral structure. Since some spiral galaxies are theorized to have formed from massive clouds of intergalactic gas collapsing and then rotationally forming into a disc structure, one could assume that a ring disc could form in place of a spiral disc if, as mentioned before, conditions are favorable. This holds true for protogalaxies, or galaxies just thought to be forming, and old galaxies that have migrated into a section of space with a higher gas content than their previous locations.

== List ==
Name	Image	Catalogue number	Distance	Notes
Cartwheel Galaxy		ESO 350-40, PGC 2248	500 Mly	lenticular galaxy
Hoag's Object		PGC 54559, PRC D-51	600 Mly	
SDSS J151713.93+213516.8				This galaxy can be seen behind Hoag's Object
AM 0644-741		AM 0644-741	300 Mly	
Kathryn's Wheel		ESO 179-13	30 Mly	collisional ring galaxy, possibly the closest
II Hz 4			617.3 ± 43.2 Mly	
NGC 660			45 Mly	polar ring galaxy
NGC 922		ESO 478-28, ISG 10	150 Mly	collisional ring galaxy
NGC 985		VV 285, Mrk 1048, MCG -02-07-035, PGC 9817	567 Mly	collisional ring galaxy
NGC 1015			118 Mly	
NGC 1142		NGC 1144, UGC 2389, Arp 118, VV 331a, Mrk 1504, CGCG 389-046, MCG +00-08-048, PGC 11012	375 Mly	Seyfert galaxy
NGC 1291		NGC 1291, NGC 1269, PGC 012209	33 Mly	
NGC 1350		PGC 013059	87.4 Mly	spiral galaxy with ring structure
NGC 1386		PGC 13333	53 Mly	spiral galaxy with ring structure
NGC 1387		PGC 13344	53 Mly	lenticular galaxy with nuclear ring
NGC 1433		PGC 13586	49 Mly	barred spiral galaxy with ring
NGC 1533		NGC 1533, PGC 14582	62 ± 4 Mly	lenticular galaxy with ring structure
NGC 1512		PGC 14391	38 Mly	Galaxy exhibits a double-ring structure
NGC 2859		UGC 5001, PGC 26649	82.8 Mly	lenticular galaxy with ring structure
NGC 3081		IC 2529, ESO 499-G31, AM 0957-223, MCG -04-24-012, PGC 28876	83 Mly	barred lenticular galaxy
NGC 3821		CGCG 127-32, MCG 4-28-30, PGC 36314, UGC 6663	271 Mly	low surface brightness galaxy
NGC 4138		LEDA 38643, UGC 7139	52 Mly	
NGC 4245		UGC 7328, MCG +05-29-049, PGC 39437	37 Mly	lenticular galaxy with ring structure
NGC 4262			50 Mly	
NGC 4513		CGCG 315-42, MCG 11-15-59, PGC 41527, UGC 7683	110 Mly	lenticular galaxy
NGC 4622		PGC 42701	200 Mly	unbarred spiral galaxy with ring
NGC 4650A		PGC 42951	126 Mly	polar ring galaxy
NGC 4774		I Zw 045	413 Mly	collisional ring galaxy
NGC 4777		NGC 4777, PGC 43852	180 Mly	
NGC 4909		PGC 44949, ESO 269-035, MCG -07-27-028	162 Mly	
NGC 6028		NGC 6028, NGC 6046, PGC 56716	203 Mly	barred lenticular galaxy
NGC 6861			124 Mly	
NGC 7020		NGC 7021, ESO 107-13, PGC 66291	138 Mly	barred lenticular galaxy
NGC 7098		ESO 48-5, IRAS 21393-7520, PGC 67266	95 Mly	double barred spiral galaxy
NGC 7217		UGC 11914, PGC 68096	50 Mly	unbarred spiral galaxy with ring
NGC 7552		IC 5294, ESO 291- G 012, VV 440, PGC 70884	56 Mly	barred spiral galaxy
NGC 7742		UGC 12760,[2] MCG +02-60-010,[2] UZC J234415.8+104601,[2] 2MASX J23441571+1046015	72 Mly	Unbarred spiral galaxy with ring, Seyfert galaxy
ESO 509-098		PGC 48609	350 Mly	
II Zw 28		Zw II 28, 2MASX J05014205+0334278	390 Mly	
Mayall's Object		Arp 148, VV 032, MCG+07-23-019, APG 148	450 Mly	collisional ring galaxy
VII Zw 466		VII Zw 466, UGC 07683	637 Mly	collisional ring galaxy
Arp-Madore 417-391		PGC 14881	670 Mly	collisional ring galaxy
LEDA 3094761			938 Mly	Emission-line galaxy
UGC 4599			91 Mly	
UGC 6614		PGC 36122	322 Mly	giant low surface brightness galaxy
UGC 7069		PGC 38254, MCG +07-25-017	708 Mly	Largest ring galaxy
Arp 10		Arp 10, UGC 01775, 2MASX J02182639+0539139	400 Mly	collisional ring galaxy
Arp 146		PGC 509	1050 Mly	interacting pair
Arp 147		IC 298	430 Mly	interacting pair
ESO 198-13		PGC 9463	237 Mly	three ring structures
LEDA 1000714		PGC 1000714, 6dFGS gJ112316.4-084007, 2MASX J11231643-0840067	360 Mly	two nearly round rings, but with different characteristics
IC 2628		PGC 34038, CGCG 067-030	601 Mly	
IC 5285		PGC 70497, UGC 12365	286 Mly	
LEDA 1405954		2MASX J10064493+1213567	673 ± 47 Mly	
LEDA 133622			392 Mly	Also a Seyfert 2 galaxy
UGC 3533		MCG +09-11-030, LEDA 19578, SWIFT J0645.9+5303	492 Mly	Also a Seyfert 2 galaxy
2MASX J09015145+5212411		LEDA 2409366	819 Mly	lenticular galaxy with ring structure
2MASS J09015012+5212226			903 Mly	Polar ring galaxy, in the lower right side of the image
MCG +07-07-072		PGC 12535	320 Mly	Barred spiral galaxy with a ring
WISEA J033303.20-275041.5			1790 Mly	Discovered in the Hubble Legacy Field
CN AC118 108			3757 Mly	
LT 41		2MASX J00075757-0433255	1004 Mly	
CFRS 14.0685		WISEA J141757.82+523050.1	1153 Mly	Discovered in Extended Groth Strip
CFRS 14.0117		EGSIRAC J141819.73+523424.4	2613 Mly	Discovered in Extended Groth Strip
Z 229-15		PGC 62756	390 Mly	Also a quasar and a Seyfert galaxy.
LEDA 1313424			567 Mly	Collisional ring galaxy, nicknamed the Bullseye.
[BZR2017] J051631.16-542938.9				
CANDELS EGS F160W J141952.0+525115.2			9813 Mly	Discovered in Extended Groth Strip, its distance calculated with redshift is around 9813 Mly, very faint, very distant
DES J024008.08-551047.5		DES J0240	1627 Mly	Its rings have a distinct coloration then the main host galaxy
2MASX J07273754-0254540		2MASX J07273754-0254540, PSCz Q07251-0248, IRAS 07251-0248	1207 Mly	interacting pair
2MASS J01074878+5406541			1446 Mly	Spiral ring galaxy
WISEA J010752.28+540643.9				on the right side of the picture, possibly collisional ring galaxy
SDSS J091450.23+085326.2			1825 Mly	
SSTSL2 J182843.93-670006.6				Behind IC 4710
Anon 1519.6+5451		LEDA 2476695		
2dFGRS TGS243Z010		GOODS-MUSIC 14880, GOODS J033233.46-274312.8		Discovered in the Hubble Legacy Field.
GS18660			11.6 Gly	Most distant known as of 2026.
NGC 483			192 Mly	

== See also ==
- List of galaxies
- Polar-ring galaxy
