= IC 2628 =

Galaxy in the constellation Leo

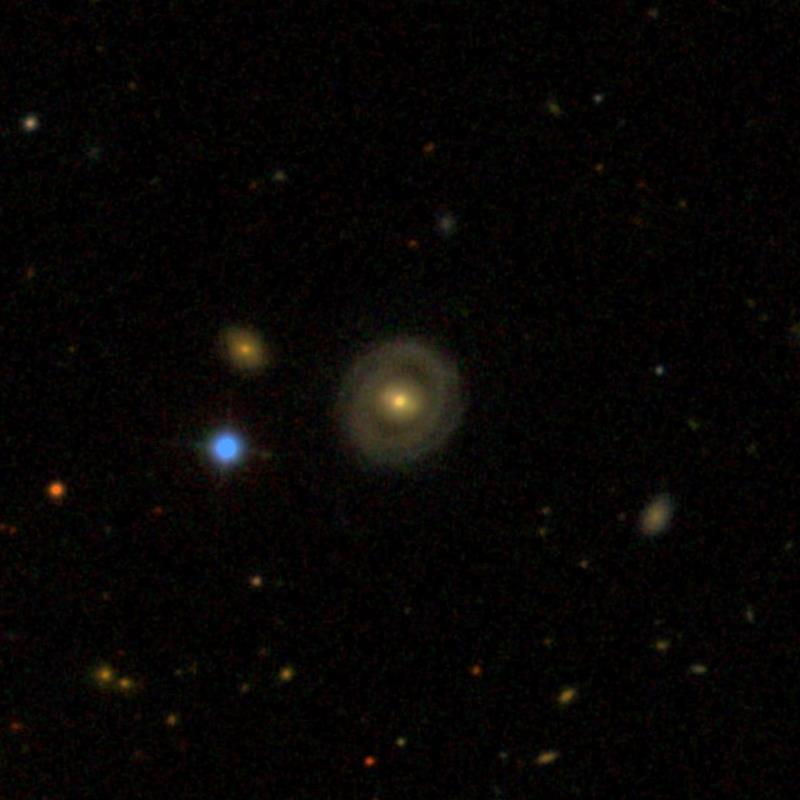
- SDSS image of IC 2628

Observation data (J2000 epoch)
- Constellation: Leo
- Right ascension: 11h 11m 37.87s
- Declination: +12d 07m 19.14s
- Redshift: 0.042168
- Heliocentric radial velocity: 12,382 km/s
- Distance: 601 Mly (184.3 Mpc)
- Apparent magnitude (V): 17.68

Characteristics
- Type: SBa, Sa
- Size: 135,000 ly
- Apparent size (V): 0.71' x 0.66'

Other designations
- PGC 34038, CGCG 067-030, 2MASX J11113786+1207196, AGC 210146, SDSS J111137.87+120719.1, NSA 066078, NPM1G+12.0262, ASK 381278.0, LEDA 34038

IC 2628 is a type SBa barred spiral galaxy with a ring located in the constellation Leo. It is located 600 million light-years from the Solar System and has an approximate diameter of 135,000 light-years. IC 2628 was discovered on March 27, 1906, by Max Wolf and is classified as a ring galaxy due to its peculiar appearance. The galaxy has a surface brightness of magnitude 23.8 and located at right ascension (11:11:37.8) and declination (+12:07:21) respectively.

== See also ==
- List of ring galaxies
- PGC 1000714
- Hoag's Object
- NGC 6028
