= ESO 198-13 =

Ring galaxy in the constellation Eridanus

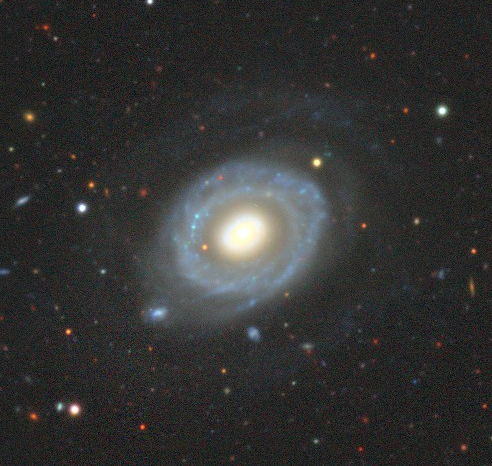
- Ring galaxy ESO 198-13 imaged by Legacy Surveys

Observation data (J2000 epoch)
- Constellation: Eridanus
- Right ascension: 02^{h} 29^{m} 16.1^{s}
- Declination: −48° 29′ 29″
- Redshift: 0.018186/5452 km/s
- Distance: 237,147,400 ly
- Apparent magnitude (V): 13.64

Characteristics
- Type: (R')SA(r)ab
- Size: ~162,773 ly (estimated)
- Apparent size (V): 1.7' x 1.2
- Notable features: Multiple-ringed Hoag-type galaxy

Other designations
- PGC 9463

ESO 198-13 is a ring galaxy with multiple ring-like structures located about 240 million light-years away in the constellation Eridanus.

== Physical characteristics ==
This galaxy has three ring structures. There is a small bright inner ring located close to the nucleus. This feature has been interpreted as a nuclear ring due to being similar to the nuclear rings in a barred spiral galaxy (e.g. NGC 1512, NGC 4314). Also this ring has a diameter of 15,527.12 light-years (4.76 kpc) which is larger than the average diameter of a nuclear ring (4,893 light-years/1.5 kpc). Surrounding the nuclear ring, a flocculent inner ring with a diameter of 54,801.6 light-years (16.8 kpc) can be found. It appears to be made of a very tightly wound spiral arm. It also could be a superposition of two rings offset from each other. Outside of the flocculent inner ring, there is a very large and faint outer ring with a diameter of 162,773.8 light-years (49.9 kpc).

== See also ==
- Hoag's object
- PGC 100174
- List of ring galaxies
- Cartwheel Galaxy
