= Hoag =

Hoag is a surname. Notable people with the surname include:

- Arthur Hoag (1921–1999), American astronomer
- Bob Hoag, American record producer and songwriter
- Charles Hoag (1808–1888), American scholar and teacher; first school master of Minneapolis, Minnesota
- Charlie Hoag (1931–2012), American professional basketball player
- Dutch Hoag (1926–2016), American race car driver
- Elizabeth Gorham Hoag (1857–1875), American sorority sister; founding member of Sigma Kappa
- Harold Hoag (b. 1966), American professional wrestler
- Jan Hoag (b. 1948), American film and television actress
- Judith Hoag (b. 1963), American actress
- Myril Hoag (1908–1971), American professional baseball player
- Peter Hoag (1937-2024), American test pilot and aerospace engineer
- Ryan Hoag (b. 1979), American professional football player
- Tami Hoag (b. 1959), American romance novelist
- Truman H. Hoag (1816–1870), American politician

== See also ==
- The Unpleasant Profession of Jonathan Hoag, a novella by Robert A. Heinlein
- Hoag's Object, a galaxy discovered by Arthur Hoag
- Hogue (disambiguation)
