= Hoag (disambiguation) =

Hoag is a surname. It may also refer to:

- Hoag, Nebraska, an unincorporated community in the United States
- 3225 Hoag, an asteroid
- Hoag (health network), in Orange County, California

== See also ==
- Hoagy (disambiguation)
