= NGC 6028 =

Galaxy in the constellation Hercules

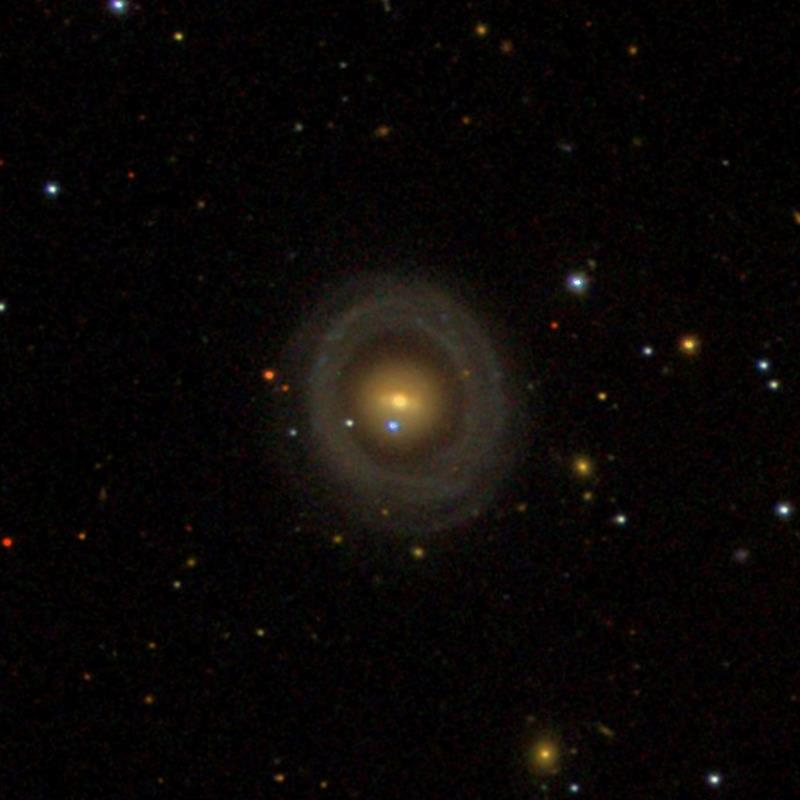
- NGC 6028 (SDSS DR14)

Observation data (J2000 epoch)
- Constellation: Hercules
- Right ascension: 16^{h} 01^{m} 28.9^{s}
- Declination: 19° 21′ 36″
- Redshift: 0.014927
- Heliocentric radial velocity: 4475 km/s
- Distance: 62.3 Mpc (203 Mly)
- Apparent magnitude (V): 14.35

Characteristics
- Type: (R)SA0+?
- Size: ~110,000 ly (35 kpc) (estimated)
- Apparent size (V): 1.3 x 1.2
- Notable features: Structure similar to that of Hoag's Object

Other designations
- NGC 6046, 1ZW 133, CGCG 108-63, MCG 3-41-43, PGC 56716, PRC C-49, UGC 10135

NGC 6028 is a barred lenticular galaxy and a ring galaxy located about 200 million light-years away in the constellation Hercules. Ring galaxies such as NGC 6028 are also known as Hoag-type galaxies as they may have a resemblance to the prototype, Hoag's Object. NGC 6028 was discovered by astronomer William Herschel on March 14, 1784. It was then rediscovered by astronomer Guillaume Bigourdan on May 4, 1886.

== Physical characteristics ==
NGC 6028 consists of a luminous core that is surrounded by a fainter outer ring. Unlike Hoag's Object, NGC 6028's core is elongated indicating the presence of a weak bar embedded in a lens-like structure. The outer ring of the galaxy appears asymmetric in structure and may be made up of tightly wound spiral arms. The observed asymmetry could be the result of one arm being richer in H II regions than the other arm.

== Group membership ==
NGC 6028 appears to lie near the Hercules cluster in the sky. However, NGC 6028 is not a member of that cluster but instead belongs to a foreground group of galaxies known as G47.

== See also ==
- List of NGC objects (6001–7000)
- List of ring galaxies
- Hoag's Object
- Cartwheel Galaxy
- PGC 1000714
- UGC 4599 - galaxy closely resembling Hoag's Object
