= 3225 Hoag =

Hungaria asteroid

Discovery
- Discovered by: C. Shoemaker; E. Shoemaker
- Discovery site: Palomar Obs.
- Discovery date: 20 August 1982

Designations
- Named after: Arthur Hoag (American astronomer)
- Alternative designations: 1982 QQ · 1977 RN_{7} 1977 SY_{2}
- Minor planet category: main-belt · (inner); Hungaria · background

Orbital characteristics
- Epoch 23 March 2018 (JD 2458200.5)
- Uncertainty parameter 0
- Observation arc: 39.52 yr (14,435 d)
- Aphelion: 1.9791 AU
- Perihelion: 1.7805 AU
- Semi-major axis: 1.8798 AU
- Eccentricity: 0.0528
- Orbital period (sidereal): 2.58 yr (941 d)
- Mean anomaly: 296.92°
- Mean motion: 0° 22^{m} 56.64^{s} / day
- Inclination: 25.060°
- Longitude of ascending node: 188.86°
- Argument of perihelion: 138.10°
- Earth MOID: 0.7960 AU (310.1038 LD)

Physical characteristics
- Mean diameter: 5.06±0.92 km 5.56 km (calculated); 5.921±0.053 km 6.24±0.06 km
- Synodic rotation period: 2.3717±0.0002 h (Note: Lightcurve plot of 3225 Hoag, Palmer Divide Observatory, B. D. Warner (2007), with a period of 2.3717±0.0002 hours and an amplitude of 0.12±0.01 mag. Data points 180. Quality code is 3. Summary figures at the LCDB.); 2.372±0.0004 h 2.3722±0.0005 h 2.3728±0.0005 h 2.373±0.002 h 2.3737±0.0004 h 2.496±0.001 h
- Geometric albedo: 0.250.287±0.038; 0.3 (assumed); 0.31±0.11; 0.3203±0.0510
- Spectral type: S/L (S3OS2); E/S (assumed)
- Absolute magnitude (H): 13.00; 13.135±0.001 (R); 13.17±0.80; 13.2; 13.4; 13.46

3225 Hoag, provisional designation 1982 QQ, is a dynamical Hungaria asteroid from the innermost regions of the asteroid belt, approximately 5.5 kilometers (3.4 miles) in diameter. It was discovered on 20 August 1982, by American astronomer couple Carolyn and Eugene Shoemaker at the Palomar Observatory in California. The stony S/L-type asteroid has a short rotation period of 2.37 hours. It was named for American astronomer Arthur Hoag.

== Orbit and classification ==
Hoag is a member of the dynamical Hungaria group, that forms the innermost dense concentration of asteroids in the Solar System. However, it is not a member of the Hungaria family (003), located within the dynamical group, but an asteroid of the background population.

It orbits the Sun in the innermost asteroid belt at a distance of 1.8–2.0 AU once every 2 years and 7 months (941 days; semi-major axis of 1.88 AU). Its orbit has an eccentricity of 0.05 and an inclination of 25° with respect to the ecliptic. The body's observation arc begins with its second of two observations, 1977 RN_{7} and 1977 SY_{2}, taken at Crimea–Nauchnij September 1977, almost 5 years prior to its official discovery observation at Palomar.

== Physical characteristics ==
The Small Solar System Objects Spectroscopic Survey (S3OS2) characterized Hoag as a stony S-type and uncommon L-type asteroid in the Tholen- and SMASS-like taxonomy, respectively.

=== Rotation period and poles ===
Several rotational lightcurves of Hoag have been obtained from photometric observations since 2007. Best-rated lightcurve by American astronomer Brian Warner at his Palmer Divide Observatory in Colorado, gave a well-defined rotation period of 2.3717 hours with a brightness amplitude of 0.12 magnitude (U=3).

In 2010, Warner also modeled a lightcurve using the data from his various photometric observations. It gave a concurring sidereal period of 2.37219 hours, as well as two spin axes at (45.0°, 45.0°) and (225.0°, 45.0°) in ecliptic coordinates (λ, β).

=== Diameter and albedo ===
According to the survey carried out by the NEOWISE mission of NASA's Wide-field Infrared Survey Explorer, Hoag measures between 5.06 and 6.24 kilometers in diameter and its surface has an albedo between 0.28 and 0.32. The Collaborative Asteroid Lightcurve Link assumes an albedo of 0.3 – a compromise figure between a stony (0.20) and an E-type (0.40) Hungarian asteroid – and calculates a diameter of 5.56 kilometers based on an absolute magnitude of 13.2.

== Naming ==
This minor planet was named after American astronomer Arthur Hoag (1921–1999), a former director of the Lowell Observatory, known for his photometric research, the development of astronomical sites and instruments, and investigations of quasars. In 1950, he discovered a type of ring galaxy known as Hoag's Object. The official naming citation was published by the Minor Planet Center on 27 December 1985 (M.P.C. 10311).
