= UGC 4599 =

Ring galaxy similar to Hoags object

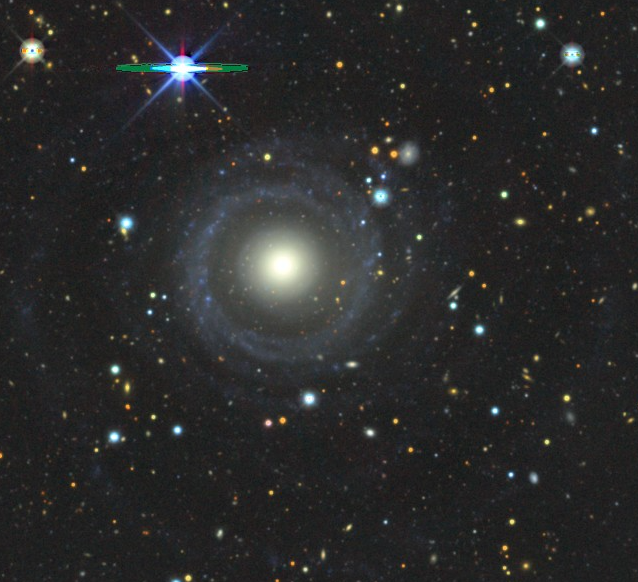
- The UGC 4599 galaxy

Observation data
- Right ascension: 08h 47m 41s.7
- Declination: +13d 25m 09s
- Distance: 87 million ly

Other designations
- 2MASX J08474167+1325089, ADBS J084743+1325, Gaia DR2 608332849909889152, LEDA 24699, SDSS J084741.68+132508.8, UGC 4599

UGC 4599 is a low luminosity elliptical-like ring galaxy that is known for being the nearest galaxy of its type to Earth at 26.9 mpc. It superficially resemble a Hoag's Object in sky imaging surveys. Because of this, it has often been called Hoag-like or a Hoag analog.

The galaxy likely appeared to be the shape it is today due to a major interacting between two galaxies at least 5 billion years ago.

== Morphology ==
The center of the galaxy is nearly round and reddish. A luminous dominate blue ring surrounds the galaxy that is composed of a one-and-a-half turn spiral feature. On side of the spiral has star formation active in the form of nine detected Hii regions.

== See also ==
- Hoag's Object
- LEDA 1000714
- NGC 6028
- NGC 7742
