= NGC 922 =

Peculiar galaxy in the constellation Fornax

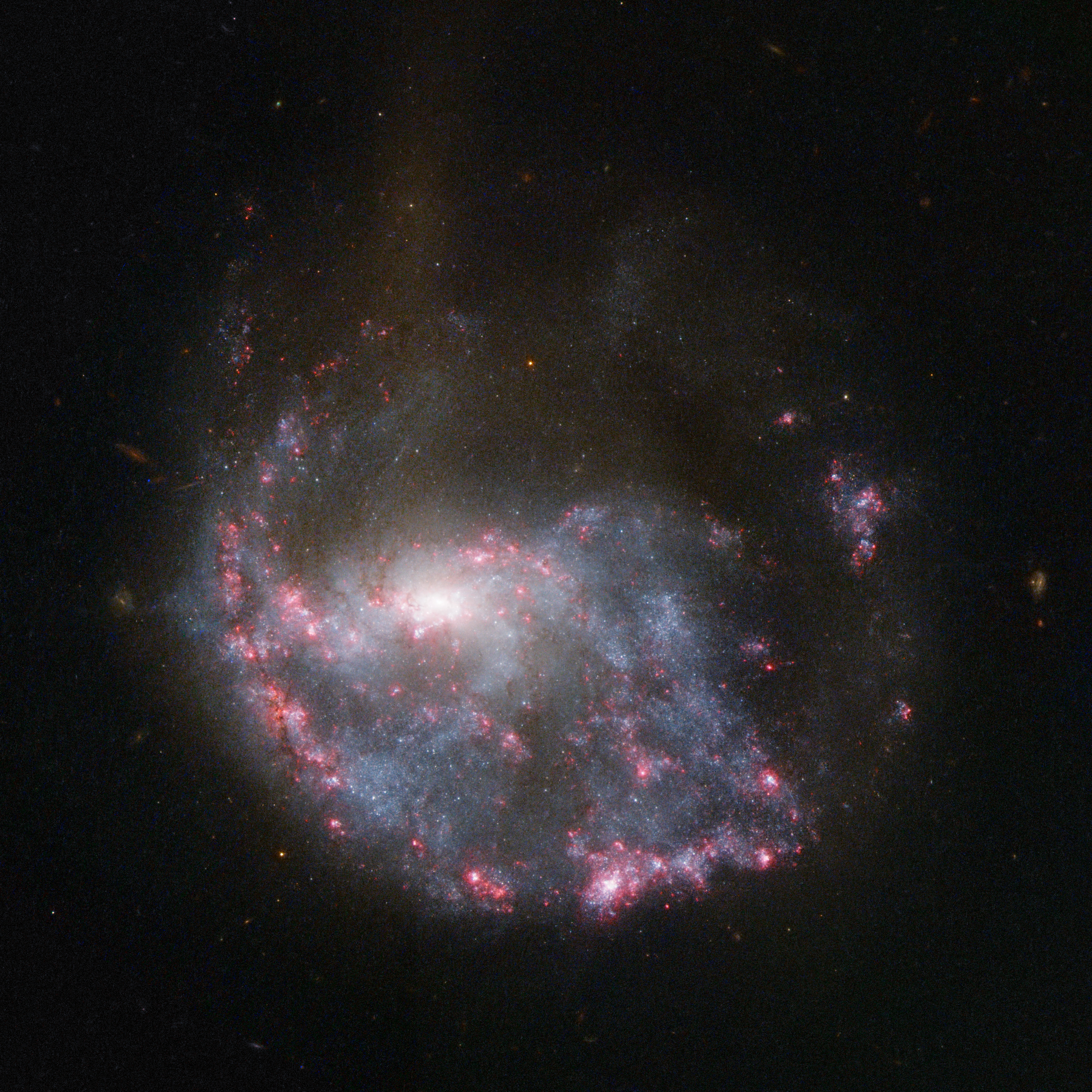
- NGC 922 imaged by the Hubble Space Telescope

Observation data (J2000 epoch)
- Constellation: Fornax
- Right ascension: 02^{h} 25^{m} 04.4634^{s}
- Declination: −24° 47′ 16.798″
- Redshift: 0.010314±0.000020
- Heliocentric radial velocity: 3,075 km/s
- Distance: 142 Mly (43.4 Mpc)
- Apparent magnitude (V): 12.21

Characteristics
- Type: SB(s)cd pec
- Mass: 5.47×10^{9} M_{☉} M_{☉}
- Size: ~105,500 ly (32.35 kpc) (estimated)
- Apparent size (V): 2′.0 × 1′.7

Other designations
- AM 0222-250, PSCz Q02228-2500, DUGRS 478-001, ESO 478-28, GSC 06433-00965, IRAS 02228-2500, UGCA 30, MCG -04-06-037, PGC 9172

NGC 922 is a peculiar galaxy in the southern constellation of Fornax. Its velocity with respect to the cosmic microwave background is 2879 ± 15 km/s, which corresponds to a Hubble distance of 138.5 ± 9.7 Mly (42.46 ± 2.98 Mpc). Additionally, 17 non-redshift measurements give a distance of 138.88 ± 7.47 Mly (42.582 ± 2.291 Mpc). It was discovered by German-British astronomer William Herschel on 17 November 1784.

NGC 922 is one of the nearest known collisional galaxies. This object was described by the Herschels as "considerably faint, pretty large, round, gradually pretty much brighter middle." The general form is described by the morphological classification of SB(s)cd pec, which indicates a peculiar (pec) barred spiral galaxy (SB) with no inner ring system around the bar (s) and loosely-wound spiral arms (cd).

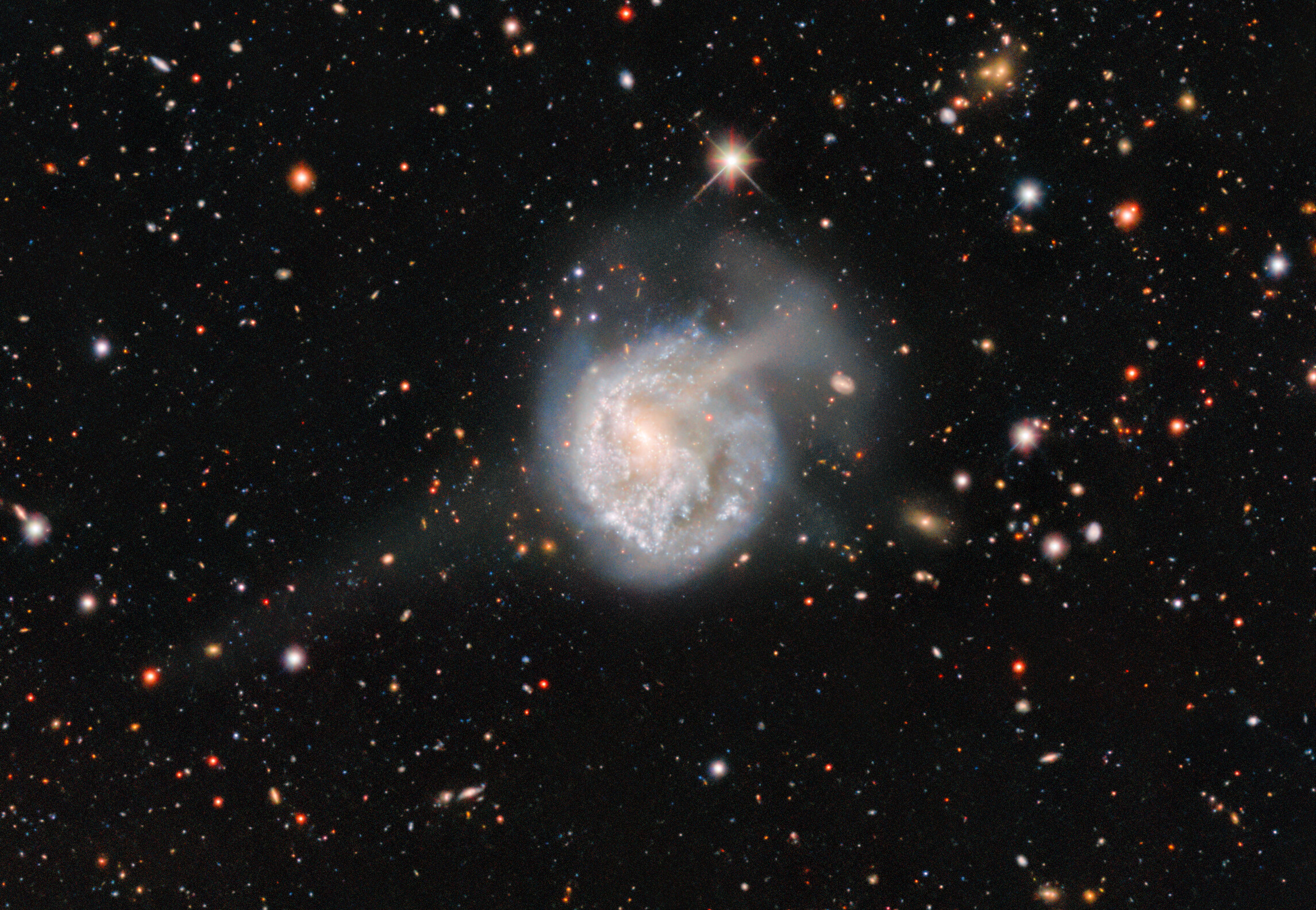
NGC 922 imaged by the Cerro Tololo Inter-American Observatory

This object was originally described as a dust-obscured grand-design galaxy – a term used to indicate a type of spiral galaxy with prominent and well-defined spiral arms. However, observation of its features suggests it has undergone a merger with a gas-rich dwarf galaxy. This has resulted in a distinctive C-shaped ring of H-alpha emission. About 104 kpc away from NGC 922, there is a dwarf galaxy called S2 that was once thought to have been responsible for NGC 922's structure. A stellar plume is seen extending from the galaxy in the direction of S2, located about 8′ away. However, the stellar plume is not connected to S2, and S2 also has it own tidal structure, which would not be possible if it had already "punched" through NGC 922.

The main galaxy has a stellar mass estimated 5.47 billion times the mass of the Sun (solar mass), while the dwarf companion has 28.2 million solar masses. The net mass of NGC 922 is estimated as 75 billion solar masses within a radius of 13.4 kpc, with 72% being in the form of dark matter and 20% as neutral hydrogen. It is a starburst galaxy, and the collision has resulted in star formation at the rate of 7–8 M_{☉}·yr^{−1}. New star clusters have been formed in the ring or bar with a mean age of 16 million years, whereas older clusters of 50 million years or more are predominantly found in the nuclear region. The tidal plume pointing toward the companion mainly consists of much older stars, indicating not much new star formation has taken place in that feature.

== Supernovae ==
Three supernovae have been observed in NGC 922:

- SN 2002gw (Type II, mag. 17.3) was discovered by Takao Doi and Berto Monard on 13 October 2002.
- SN 2008ho (Type II-P, mag. 16.5) was discovered by CHASE (CHilean Automatic Supernovas sEarch) on 26 November 2008.
- SN 2024fa (Type II, mag. 17.98) was discovered by The Young Supernova Experiment (YSE) on 3 January 2024.

== See also ==
- Cartwheel Galaxy
