= NGC 3821 =

Spiral galaxy in the constellation Leo

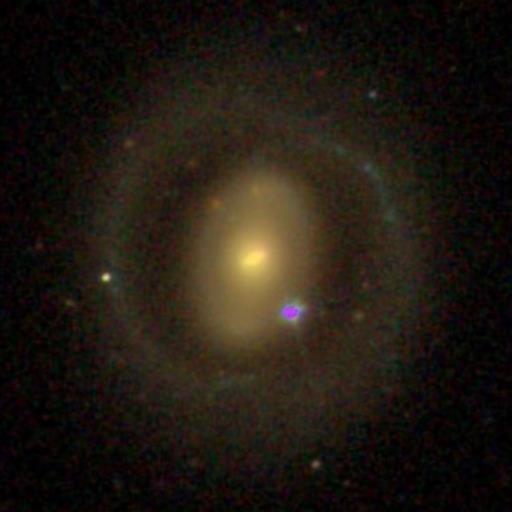
- SDSS image of NGC 3821.

Observation data (J2000 epoch)
- Constellation: Leo
- Right ascension: 11^{h} 42^{m} 09.1^{s}
- Declination: 20° 18′ 56″
- Redshift: 0.019227
- Heliocentric radial velocity: 5764 km/s
- Distance: 271 Mly (83.1 Mpc)
- Group or cluster: Leo Cluster
- Apparent magnitude (V): 13.7

Characteristics
- Type: (R)SAB(s)ab
- Size: ~123,000 ly (37.7 kpc) (estimated)
- Apparent size (V): 1.4 x 1.3

Other designations
- CGCG 127-32, MCG 4-28-30, PGC 36314, UGC 6663

NGC 3821 is a low surface brightness spiral galaxy and a ring galaxy about 270 million light-years away in the constellation Leo. The galaxy was discovered by astronomer William Herschel on April 26, 1785 and is a member of the Leo Cluster.

== See also ==
- List of NGC objects (3001–4000)
- NGC 2859
- NGC 3081
- Malin 1
