= Hogue =

Hogue is a surname common to France, England and Scotland. Hogue is a Norman-French topographic name derived from the Old Norman word hogue, itself from Old Norse haugr meaning hill or mound and appears as a habitational name for locations in Seine-Maritime, Calvados, Eure, and Manche in Normandy as well as in the Channel Islands.

Hogue may refer to:

== People ==
- Alexandre Hogue (1898–1994), American artist
- Benoît Hogue (born 1966), Canadian ice hockey player
- Bob Hogue (born 1953), American politician, author, columnist and sportscaster
- Bobby Hogue (1921–1987), American Major League Baseball player
- Bobby Hogue (politician) (1939-2023), American politician
- Cal Hogue (1927–2005), American baseball player
- James Hogue (born 1959), American con man
- Jean-Pierre Hogue (1927–2012), Member of the Canadian House of Commons
- Jeffrey C. Hogue, American businessman, owner of Charles Atlas Ltd.
- Michael Hogue (born 1975), Australian former rugby player
- Oliver Hogue (1880–1919), Australian soldier, journalist, and poet
- Paul Hogue (1940–2009), American basketball player
- Russ Hogue (born 1974), American kickboxer
- Shorty Hogue (fl. 1940s), American boxer
- Tien Hogue, Anne Christina Hogue (1892-1964), Australian actress of stage and screen in the silent era
- Wilson Thomas Hogue (1852–1920), American bishop of the Free Methodist Church

== Places ==
- Hogue Creek, a stream in Virginia
- Les Hogues, a commune in the Eure department in Normandy, France

== Other uses ==
- HMS Hogue, three Royal Navy ships
- Hogue (company), American manufacturer of firearm accessories and related products

== See also ==
- Battles of Barfleur and La Hougue, a naval engagement in the Nine Years' War
- Hoag (disambiguation)
