= SN 2021afdx =

Supernova

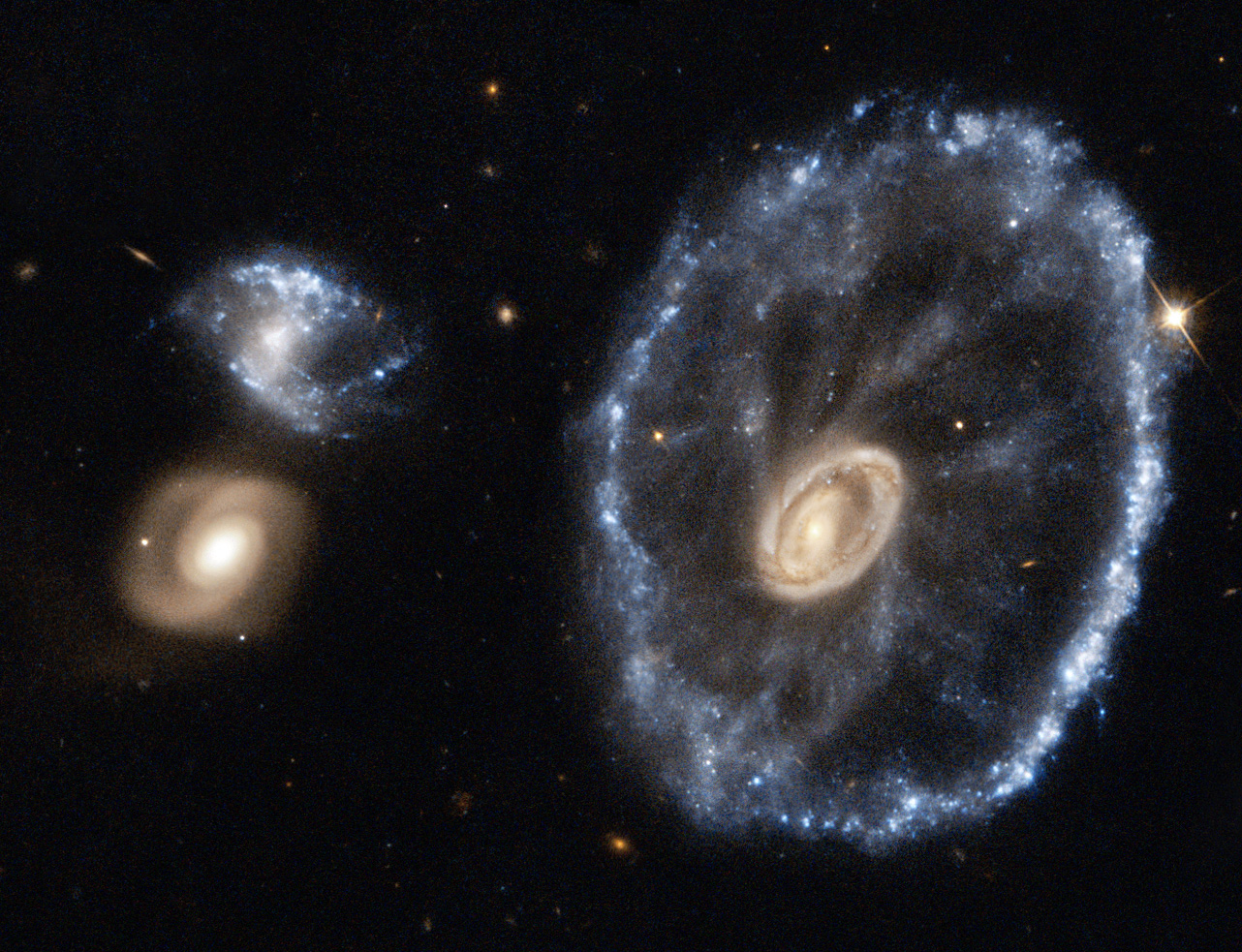
- Image of the host Cartwheel Galaxy
- Event type: Supernova
- Type IIb
- Date: 23 November 2021 by ATLAS
- Constellation: Sculptor
- Right ascension: 00^{h} 37^{m} 41.1368^{s}
- Declination: −33° 42′ 58.712″
- Epoch: J2000
- Distance: c. 500 million ly
- Host: Cartwheel Galaxy
- Progenitor type: Yellow Supergiant

SN 2021afdx is a Type IIb supernova that exploded in the Cartwheel Galaxy, a ring galaxy located around 500 million light-years away in the constellation Sculptor. Discovered on 23 November 2021 by the Asteroid Terrestrial-impact Last Alert System (ATLAS), it is one of the few supernovae observed in detail with both ground-based telescopes and the James Webb Space Telescope. The event is notable for revealing an infrared echo from pre-existing circumstellar dust, providing key insights into dust production and heating mechanisms in core-collapse supernovae.

== Observation ==
SN 2021afdx was later observed by the James Webb Space Telescope during its Early Release Observations of the Cartwheel Galaxy around 200 days after the supernova occurred.

Follow-up spectroscopy conducted by the extended Public ESO Spectroscopic Survey for Transient Objects (ePESSTO+) using the FLOYDS spectrograph at the Las Cumbres Observatory confirmed its classification as a Type IIb supernova.
