= UGC 7069 =

Largest ring galaxy

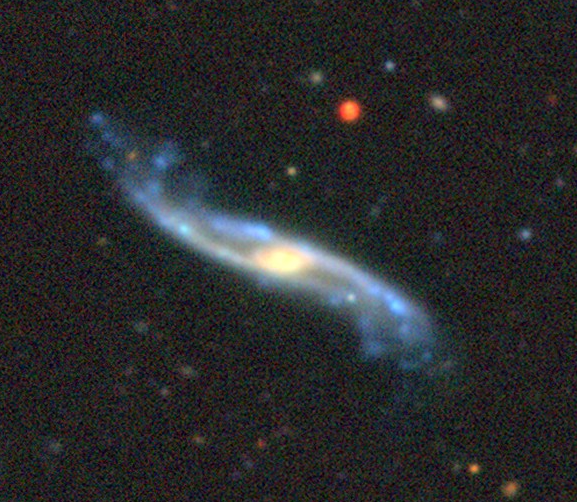
- UGC 7069 from the Legacy Survey DR10

Observation data
- Constellation: Ursa Major
- Right ascension: 12:04:57.9
- Declination: +43:08:59.0
- Redshift: 0.052 z
- Distance: 233.16 ± 16.32 Mpc (760 ± 53 Mly)
- Absolute magnitude (B): 15.70

Characteristics
- Type: Ring galaxy
- Size: 388,885 ly (119.29 kpc) (estimated)
- Notable features: Largest ring galaxy

Other designations
- PGC 38254

UGC 7069 is a very large ring galaxy located about 760 million light years from Earth in the constellation of Ursa Major. It is currently the largest ring galaxy discovered with a diameter of approximately 115 kiloparsecs (~390,000 light-years) making it twice the diameter of the Cartwheel Galaxy which for reference has a diameter of roughly 45.9 kiloparsecs. It is a starburst galaxy with high star formation rate (SFR) of 13 solar masses per year.

== Morphology ==
The edges of the galaxy are warped, which is not commonly seen in other ring galaxies. The galaxy has a double nucleus with lots of A-type stars located there. This peculiar morphology is from a galaxy collision making UGC 7069 a massive collision ring galaxy.

There are several candidate galaxies that may have collided with UGC 7069 to form its unusual structure. They include:

1. SDSS J120433.94+430611.1
2. SDSS J120432.24+430307.2
3. SDSS J120515.56+431008.4
4. SDSS J120517.29+430534.8
5. SDSS J120523.31+431107.5

== Discovery ==
It was detected by the Kitt Peak National Observatory (KPNO) International Spectroscopic survey as an emission-line galaxy.
