= Kathryn's Wheel =

Closest and smallest ring galaxy discovered

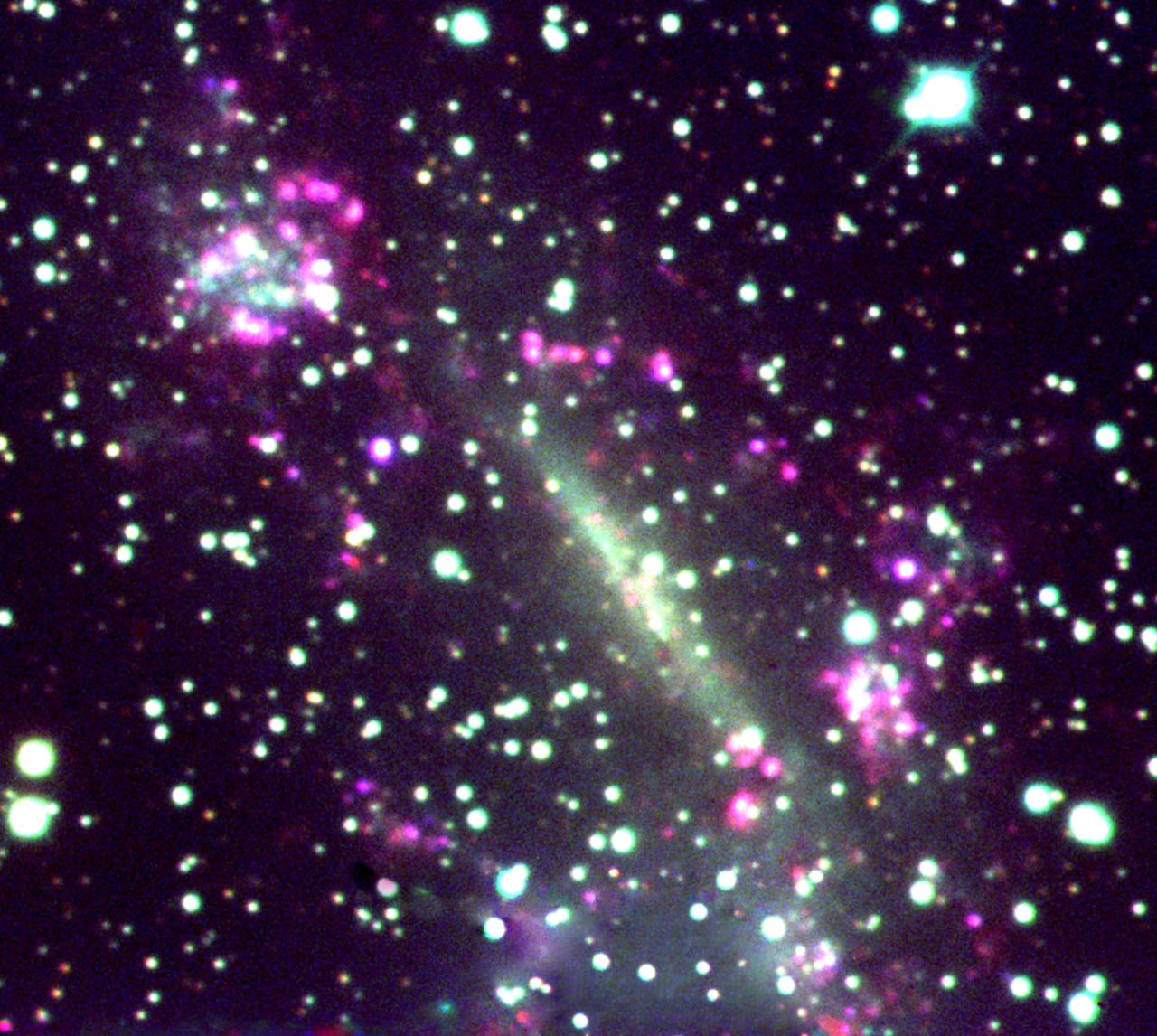
- Image of the Kathryn's Wheel galaxy Cerro-Tololo InterAmerican Observatory 4 meter telescope in Chile.

Observation data (J2000 epoch)
- Constellation: Ara
- Right ascension: 16:47:19.7
- Declination: −57:26:31
- Distance: 30 million

Characteristics
- Type: Ring galaxy
- Mass: 6.6x10^9 M_{☉}
- Size: 6.1 kiloparsecs
- Notable features: Closest ring galaxy and one of the smallest

Other designations
- ESO 179-13

The Kathryn's Wheel (also designated as ESO 179-13) is the closest collisional ring galaxy to the Milky Way Galaxy located at a distance of only ~10 mpc placing it within the nearby galactic neighborhood. The entire galaxy including its rings has a diameter of 6.1 kpc. This makes the Kathryn's Wheel galaxy among the smallest collisional ring galaxies discovered to date and classed as a dwarf galaxy. The mass of the galaxy including the stars and Hi regions total to 6.6 billion solar masses. It was named after the wife of one of the astronomers who discovered the system.

It got its ring shape due to a head on collision with another galaxy that it is currently interacting with. Like most collisional ring galaxies, it is located in a region of space with a low number of major galaxies that are spread apart.

It has scientific value due to its small size which is not seen in other collisional ring galaxies that are larger. Because dwarf galaxies outnumber regular large galaxies, it is expected that colliding dwarf galaxies may outnumber larger ring galaxies.

== Morphology ==
The entire galaxy including the disk and the ring has a total diameter of 6.1 kpc. The ring surrounding the Kathryn's Wheel is displaced from the center by 589 parsecs. The ring is complete and has several regions full of high star formation activity. Around 0.2-0.5 solar masses worth of stars form per year. This intense rate of star formation was caused by the recent collision event that this galaxy underwent. The shock waves compressed the gas which collapsed and triggered the formation of new stars.
