= VII Zw 466 =

Ring galaxy with a empty central region

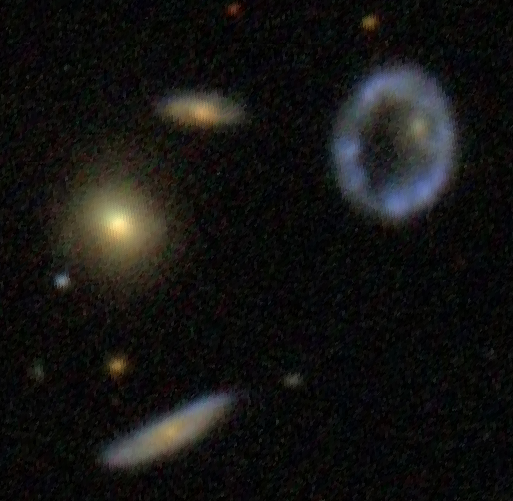
- Image of BII Zw 466 from SDSS

Observation data
- Constellation: Draco
- Distance: 650 million

Characteristics
- Type: “Empty” Collisional ring galaxy
- Notable features: The inner region where core is empty

VII Zw 466 is a collision ring galaxy located 650 million light years from Earth in the tail of the Constellation of Draco. It can also be described as an “empty ring galaxy” due to the lack of stuff at the center where the galactic core would normally be. The origin of the ring shape of VII Zw 466 is from a slightly off-center collision with a high-speed intruder galaxy that was small but massive galaxy. The collision between the two galaxies produced a rapidly expanding density wave in the disk. This collision also produced a high star formation rate.

The disk of this galaxy has a large asymmetry in the radio continuum. This could be due to the disk of VII Zw 466 trapping cosmic ray particles or an enhanced rate of supernova activity.
