= Z 229-15 =

Ring galaxy in Constellation Lyra

- Z 229-15, as photographed by the Hubble Space Telescope

Observation data (Epoch J2000)
- Constellation: Lyra
- Right ascension: 19 5 25.87
- Declination: 42° 27' 41.22"
- Redshift: 0.027879
- Distance: 390 million
- Type: Sy1
- Notable features: Seyfert galaxy containing a quasar

Other designations
- PGC 62756, CGCG 229-015, KIC 006932990, 2PBC J1905.3+4232

Z 229-15 is a ring galaxy in the constellation Lyra. It is around 390 million light-years from Earth. It has been referred to by NASA and other space agencies as hosting an active galactic nucleus, a quasar, and a Seyfert galaxy, each of which overlap in some way.

Z 229-15 was first discovered by astronomer, D. Proust from the Meudon Observatory in 1990. According to Proust, he described the object as a possible obscured spiral galaxy featuring strong signs of absorption. Additionally, Z 229-15 was also observed through the 1.93-m telescope taken at Observatorie de Haute-Provence.

Z 229-15's classification has been up for speculation for many years. Z 229-15 has been widely called a quasar, and if this is true would make Z 229-15 positively local. Many space agencies, notably NASA, have called it a Seyfert galaxy that contains a quasar, and that, by definition, hosts an active galactic nuclei. This would make Z 229-15 a very uncommon galaxy in scientific terms.

Z 229-15 has a supermassive black hole at its core. The mass of the black hole is $\log_{10}M_{BH}=6.94\pm0.14$ solar masses. The interstellar matter in Z 229-15 gets so hot that it releases a large amount of energy across the electromagnetic spectrum on a regular basis.
