= LEDA 1313424 =

Collisional ring galaxy

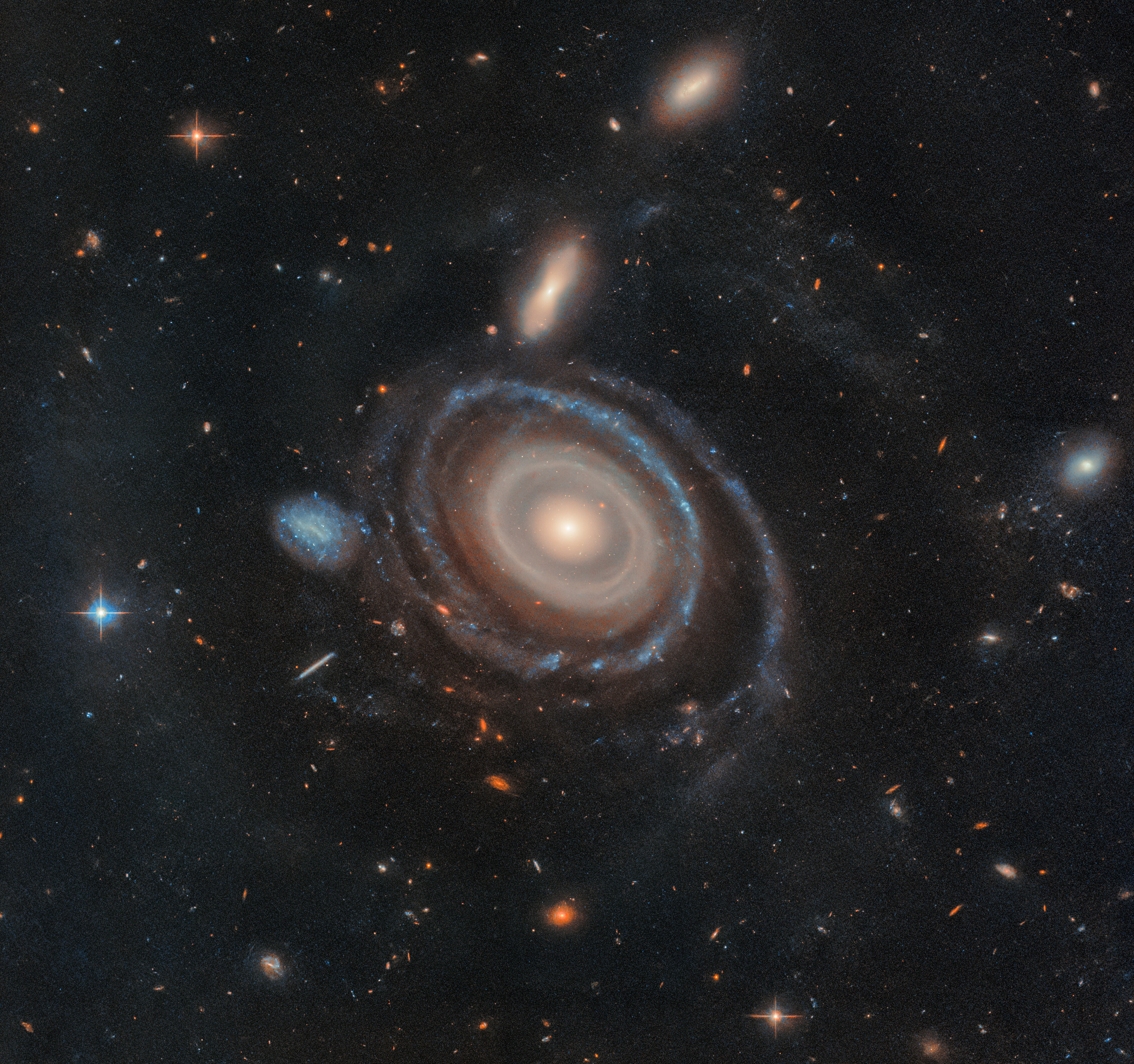
- LEDA 1313424 imaged by the Hubble Space Telescope. The blue dwarf galaxy can be seen on the center left of the galaxy.

Observation data (J2000 epoch)
- Constellation: Pisces
- Right ascension: 00^{h} 09^{m} 39.3477^{s}
- Declination: +07° 04′ 49.292″
- Redshift: 0.039414
- Heliocentric radial velocity: 11,816±248 km/s
- Distance: 551.1 ± 42.1 Mly (168.97 ± 12.92 Mpc)

Characteristics
- Type: Collisional ring galaxy
- Size: 250,000 ly
- Apparent size (V): 0.62′ × 0.50′
- Notable features: A nine ringed collisional galaxy

Other designations
- Bullseye galaxy, WISEA J000939.34+070449.2, 2MASX J00093930+0704489

LEDA 1313424 (also known as the Bullseye Galaxy) is a collisional ring galaxy (CRG) located in the constellation Pisces around 551 million light years from Earth. It is notable for its nine identified rings making it the galaxy with the highest number of rings discovered. About 50 million years ago, a blue dwarf galaxy collided with LEDA 1313424 through its central region, initiating a burst of star formation and causing it to have an active galactic nucleus (AGN). The impactor is currently 130,000 light years from LEDA 1313424.

This classification as a CRG is disputed by astronomers including Barry Madore and Alar Toomre. They believe LEDA 1313424 is just a tightly wound spiral galaxy like NGC 488. It is believed that doppler shift measurements of different parts of the galaxy should be able to resolve the dispute.

== Morphology ==
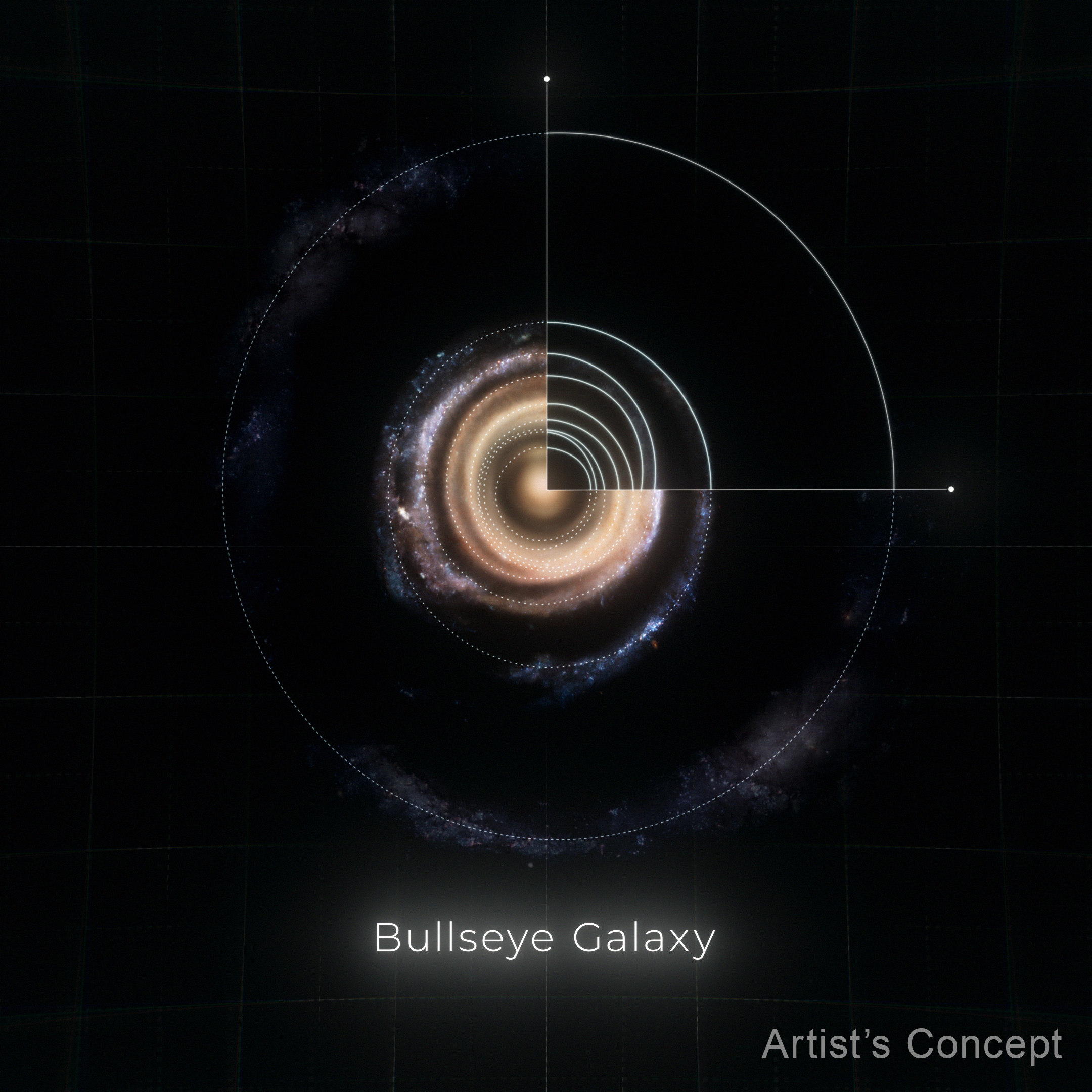
Artistic concept diagram of the rings of LEDA 1313424.

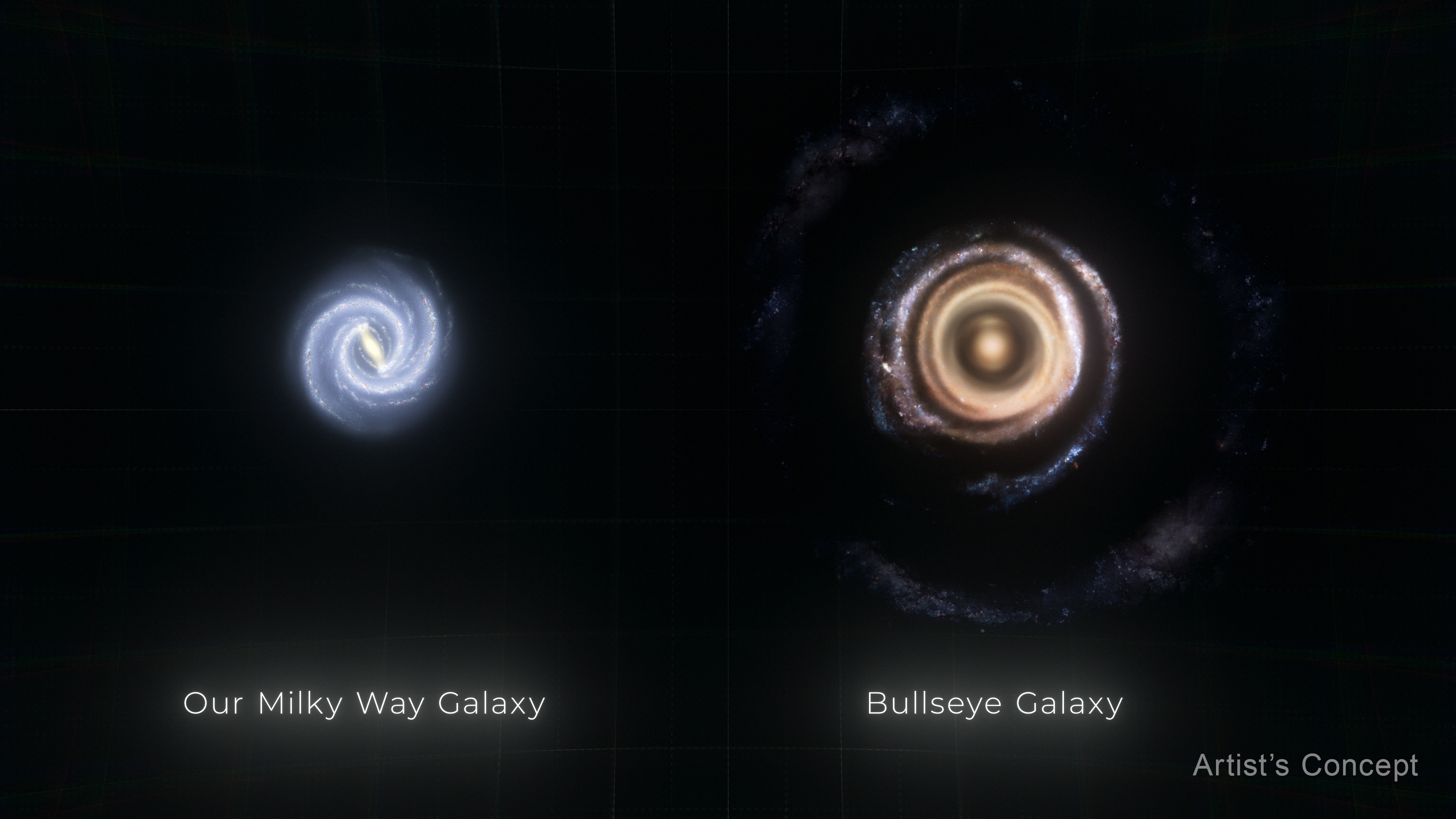
Illustration of LEDA 1313424 compared to the Milky Way galaxy, the galaxy which Earth is located.

Currently, nine rings have been identified in LEDA 1313424 with several 'piled up' near the central region of the galaxy and others extending tens of kiloparsecs from the center of the galaxy (~70 kpc). The outskirts of the galaxy have numerous star formation regions which surround the much redder inner ring structures.

== Collision Event ==
Around 50 million years ago, a small blue dwarf galaxy merged with LEDA 1313424 nearly head-on. The galaxy passed through the central region of LEDA 1313424 at an estimated speed ranging from 500-2000 kilometers per second. This collision event with the dwarf galaxy passing through the center of the galaxy is how LEDA 1313424 received its nickname.
