= NGC 7217 =

Galaxy in the constellation Pegasus

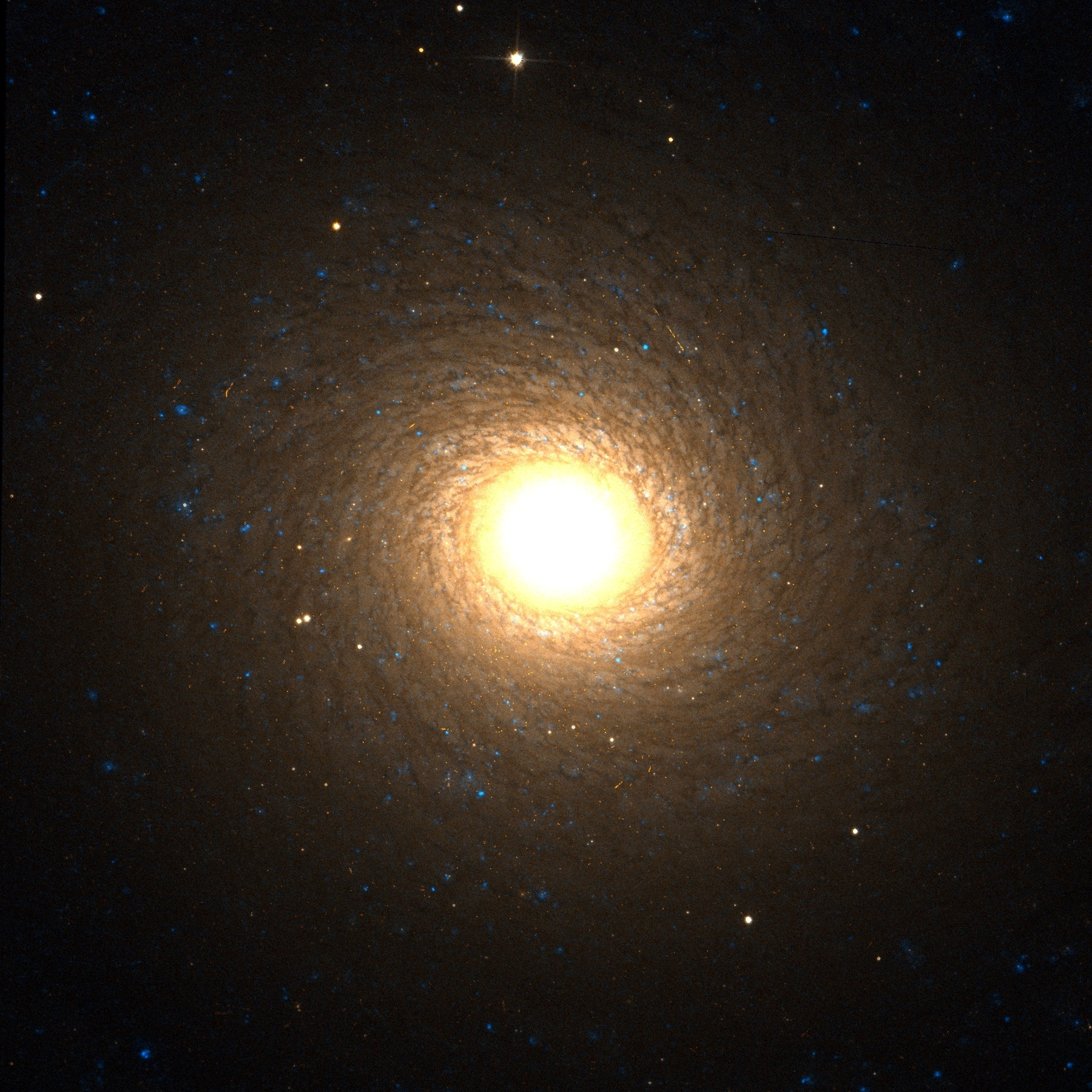
- Spiral Galaxy NGC 7217 by HST, 1.62′ view

Observation data (J2000 epoch)
- Constellation: Pegasus
- Right ascension: 22^{h} 07^{m} 52.4^{s}
- Declination: +31° 21′ 33″
- Redshift: 952 ± 2 km/s
- Distance: 50.0 Mly
- Apparent magnitude (V): 11.0

Characteristics
- Type: (R)SA(r)ab
- Apparent size (V): 3.9′ × 3.2′

Other designations
- UGC 11914, PGC 68096

NGC 7217 is an unbarred spiral galaxy in the constellation Pegasus.

== Features ==
NGC 7217 is a gas-poor system whose main features are the presence of several rings of stars concentric to its nucleus: three main ones –the outermost one being of the most prominent and the one that features most of the gas and star formation of this galaxy – plus several others inside the innermost one discovered with the help of the Hubble Space Telescope; a feature that suggests NGC 7217's central regions have suffered several starbursts. There is also a very large and massive spheroid that extends beyond its disk.

Other noteworthy features this galaxy has are the presence of a number of stars rotating in the opposite direction around the galaxy's center to most of them and two distinct stellar populations: one of intermediate age on its innermost regions and a younger, metal-poor version on its outermost ones.

It has been suggested these features were caused by a merger with another galaxy and, in fact, computer simulations show that NGC 7217 could have been a large lenticular galaxy that merged with one or two smaller gas-rich ones of late Hubble type becoming the spiral galaxy we see today; however right now this galaxy is isolated in space, with no nearby major companions. More recent research presents a somewhat different scenario in which NGC 7217's massive bulge and halo would have been formed in a merger and the disk formed later (and is still growing) either accreting gas from the intergalactic medium or smaller gas-rich galaxies, or most likely from a previously existing reserve.

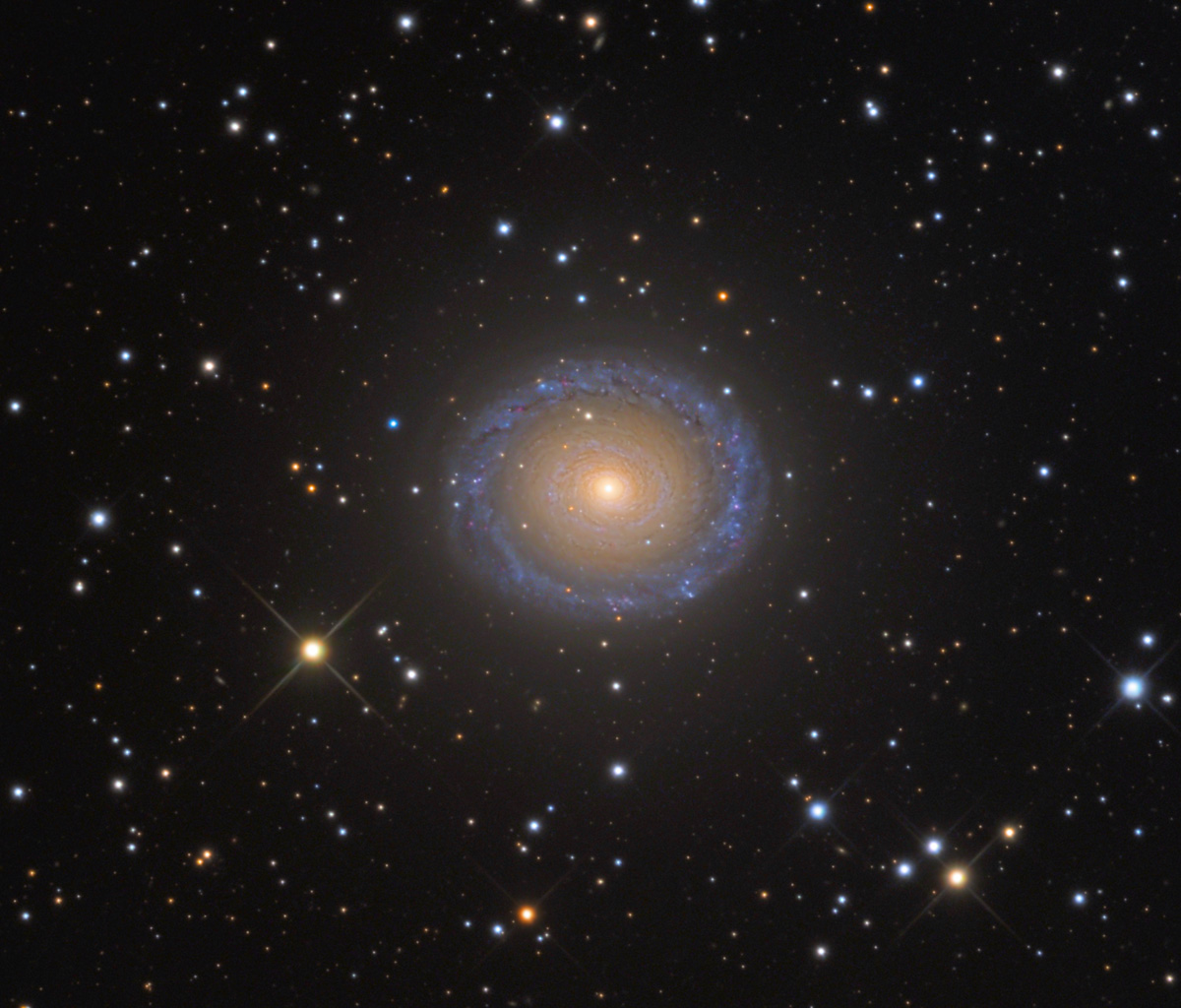
Wide field view of the galaxy

== See also ==
- NGC 1512
- NGC 7742, a very similar galaxy in the same constellation
