= UGC 6614 =

Giant spiral galaxy

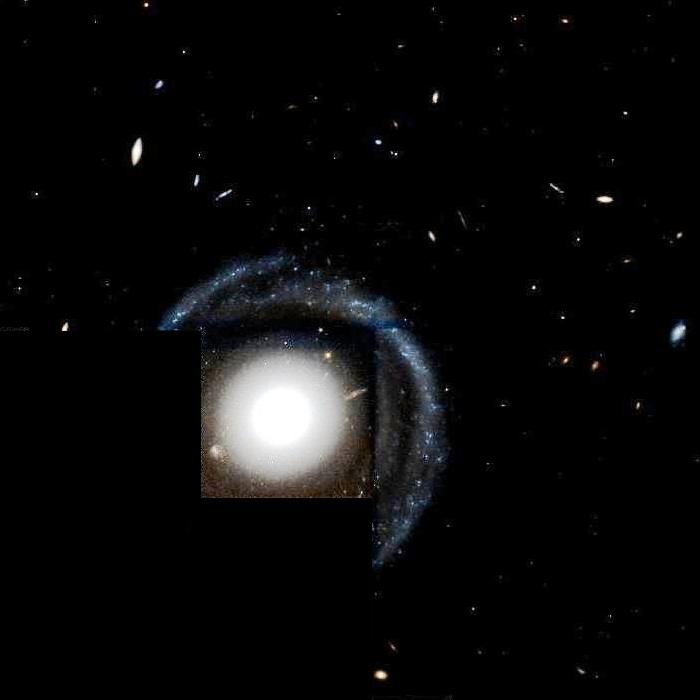
- The LSB galaxy UGC 6614, imaged by the Hubble Space Telescope

Observation data (J2000 epoch)
- Constellation: Leo
- Right ascension: 11^{h} 39^{m} 14.9^{s}
- Declination: 17° 08′ 37″
- Redshift: 0.021188 ± 0.000007
- Heliocentric radial velocity: 6,359 ± 2 km/s
- Distance: 322 Mly (98.72 Mpc)
- Apparent magnitude (V): 14.377
- Absolute magnitude (B): -22.00 ± 0.50

Characteristics
- Type: (R)SA(r)a
- Size: ~309,000 ly (94.75 kpc) (estimated)
- Apparent size (V): 1.7' × 1.4'

Other designations
- 2MASX J11391484+1708368, MCG +03-30-029, PGC 36122, CGCG 097-40

UGC 6614 is a giant spiral galaxy located about 330 million light-years away in the constellation Leo. It has an estimated diameter of nearly 300,000 light-years.

== Physical characteristics ==
UGC 6614 is classified as a low surface brightness (LSB) galaxy. The galaxy is nearly face-on and has a ring-like feature around its bulge, with distinctive extended spiral arms. The bulge of UGC 6614 is found to be red, similar to those of S0 and other elliptical galaxies, hinting at the existence of an old star population. In its center, globular clusters are present.

It is hypothesised UGC 6614 might be a giant elliptical galaxy, but because of repeated mergers with other disk galaxies, it shows a stellar disk structure, causing its spiral-like appearance.

UGC 6614 possibly shows the highest metallicity known for an LSB galaxy with an estimated log value of (O/H) 1/4 3 to 2.84. Its nucleus shows AGN activity at optical wavelengths and appears as a bright core in X-ray emission, according to XMM-Newton archival data.

=== Black hole ===
UGC 6614 contains a supermassive black hole in its center, estimated at 3.8 million solar masses.

=== Unconfirmed Supernova ===
AT 2020ojw, an astronomical transient, was discovered in UGC 6614 in July 2020 by ATLAS (Asteroid Terrestrial-impact Last Alert System). It had a magnitude of 18.4 and is a candidate supernova.

== Group Membership ==
UGC 6614 is a member of a small group of 3 galaxies known as [T2015] nest 100958. [T2015] nest 100958 has a velocity dispersion of 244 km/s and an estimated mass of 1.38 × 10^{13} M_{☉}. Other members of the group include its brightest member, NGC 3767, and CGCG 097-024. The group is part of the Coma Supercluster.

== See also ==
- NGC 45
- Low-surface-brightness galaxy
