= NGC 4777 =

Galaxy in the constellation Virgo

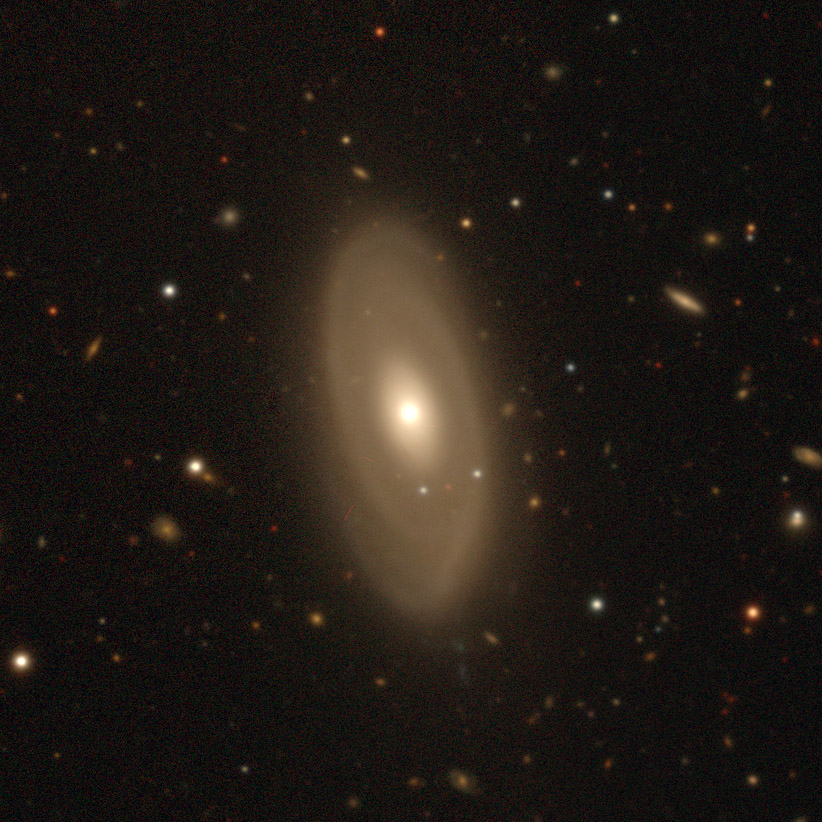
- legacy surveys image of NGC 4777

Observation data (J2000 epoch)
- Constellation: Virgo
- Right ascension: 12^{h} 53^{m} 58.54196^{s}
- Declination: −08° 46′ 32.5147″
- Redshift: 0.011905
- Heliocentric radial velocity: 3548 km/s
- Distance: 175.1 Mly (53.70 Mpc)
- Apparent magnitude (B): 14.5

Characteristics
- Type: (R)SAB(s)a:

Other designations
- MCG -01-33-044, PGC 43852

NGC 4777 is an intermediate spiral ring galaxy. It is estimated to be about 180 million light-years (or about 54 megaparsecs) away from the Sun. It was discovered on March 3, 1786 by the astronomer William Herschel.
