= NGC 1142 =

Interacting and distorted spiral galaxy in the constellation Cetus

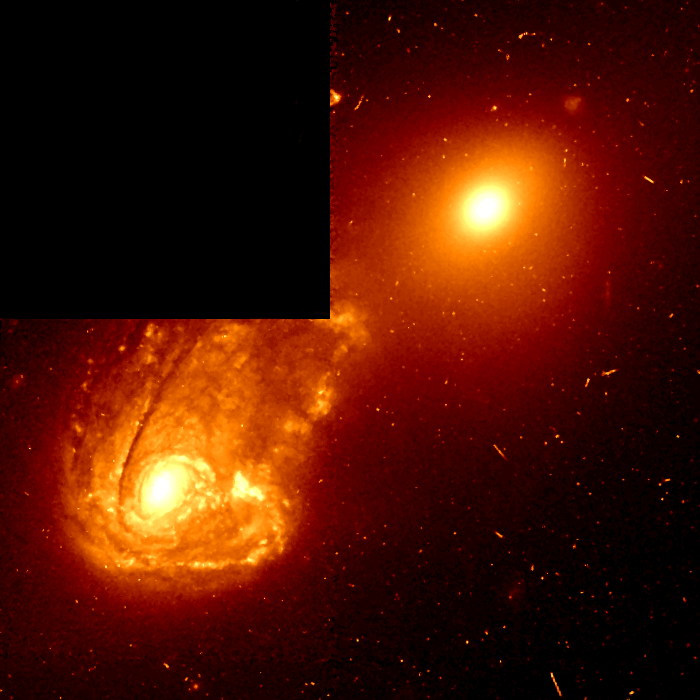
- NGC 1142 (left) by the Hubble Space Telescope

Observation data (J2000 epoch)
- Constellation: Cetus
- Right ascension: 02^{h} 55^{m} 12.1^{s}
- Declination: −00° 11′ 01″
- Redshift: 0.028847 ± 0.000047
- Heliocentric radial velocity: 8,648 ± 14 km/s
- Distance: 375 Mly (115 Mpc)
- Apparent magnitude (V): 12.8

Characteristics
- Type: S pec (Ring B)
- Size: 424,000 ly (130 kpc)
- Apparent size (V): 1.4 x 1.2 arcmin (secondary) and 1.56 x 0.83 arcmin (primary)
- Notable features: Seyfert galaxy

Other designations
- NGC 1144, UGC 2389, Arp 118, VV 331a, Mrk 1504, CGCG 389-046, MCG +00-08-048, PGC 11012

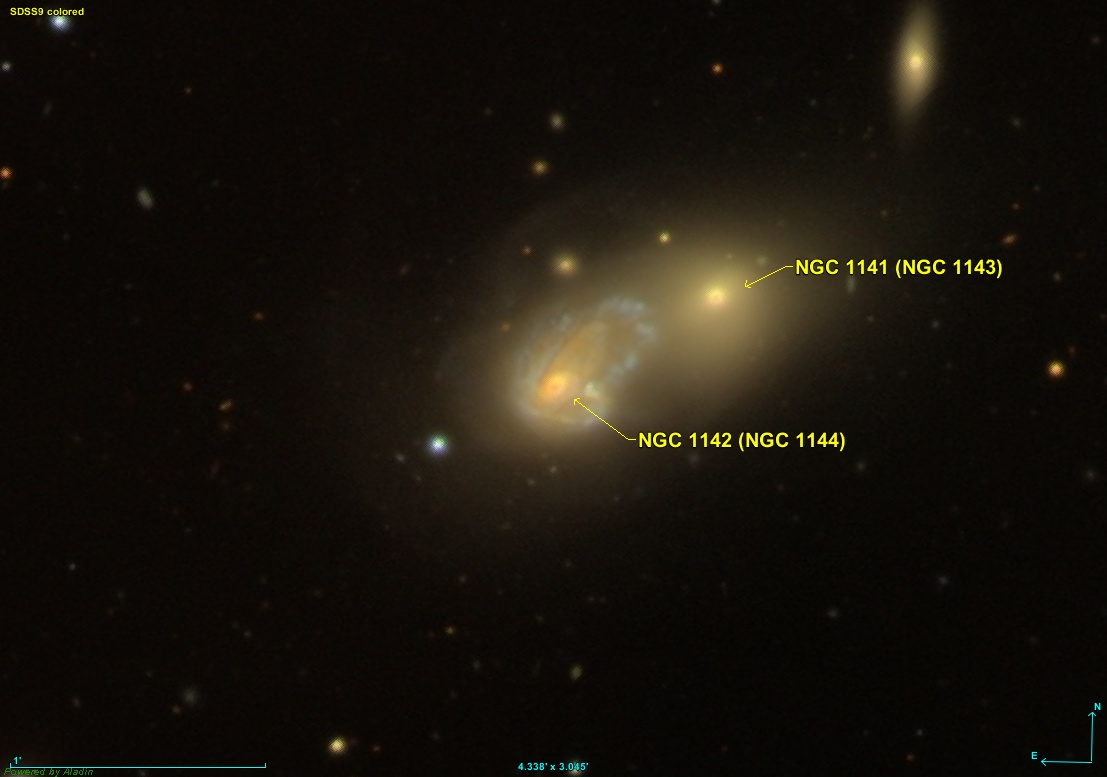
NGC 1142 and NGC 1141 imaged by the Sloan Digital Sky Survey

NGC 1142 (also known as NGC 1144) is a distorted spiral galaxy in the constellation of Cetus. It is located about 370 million light years away from Earth, NGC 1142 is approximately 420,000 light years across. It is a type 2 Seyfert galaxy. It interacts with the elliptical galaxy NGC 1141.

It was discovered by Albert Marth on October 5, 1864, who noted a location 40 arcminutes north of the real location, and it was discovered independently on November 17, 1876, by Édouard Stephan.

== Characteristics ==
NGC 1142 is a spiral galaxy which interacts with the elliptical galaxy NGC 1141. The linear separation of the two galaxies is 40 arcseconds, which corresponds to about 20 kiloparsecs at the distance of NGC 1142. The closest encounter took place 22 million years before the observed moment and created a density wave across NGC 1142, which resulted in the formation of knots of gas and stars, and led to the distortion of the spiral galaxy, creating a knotty loop or ring that extends towards NGC 1141 and an off-centre nucleus. A stellar bridge connects the two galaxies.

The total infrared luminosity of the galaxy is 2.2×10^{11} L_{☉}, and thus it is categorised as a luminous infrared galaxy. Much of the mid-infrared emission originates from a massive extra-nuclear star formation region. Very large star clusters, categorised as super star clusters, have been formed in the loops, as a result of the increased gas density created by the density waves of the impact.

The gas dynamics in the galaxy are characterised by the very large velocity range, which is up to 1,100 m/s for the CO emission. NGC 1142 is one of the most luminous galaxies in the local universe as far as CO emission is concerned, twice as bright as the merger remnant Arp 220. Most of the emission originates from the ring, and especially its southern part, and a giant HII region west of the nucleus.

The nucleus of NGC 1142 has been found to be active and it has been categorised as a type II Seyfert galaxy. The most accepted theory for the energy source of active galactic nuclei is the presence of an accretion disk around a supermassive black hole. The mass of the black hole in the centre of NGC 1142 is estimated to be 10^{(8.40 ± 0.21)} (155–410 million) M_{☉}.

== See also ==
- Eyes Galaxies – a similar pair of interacting galaxies
