= Arp 146 =

Interacting galaxies in the constellation Cetus

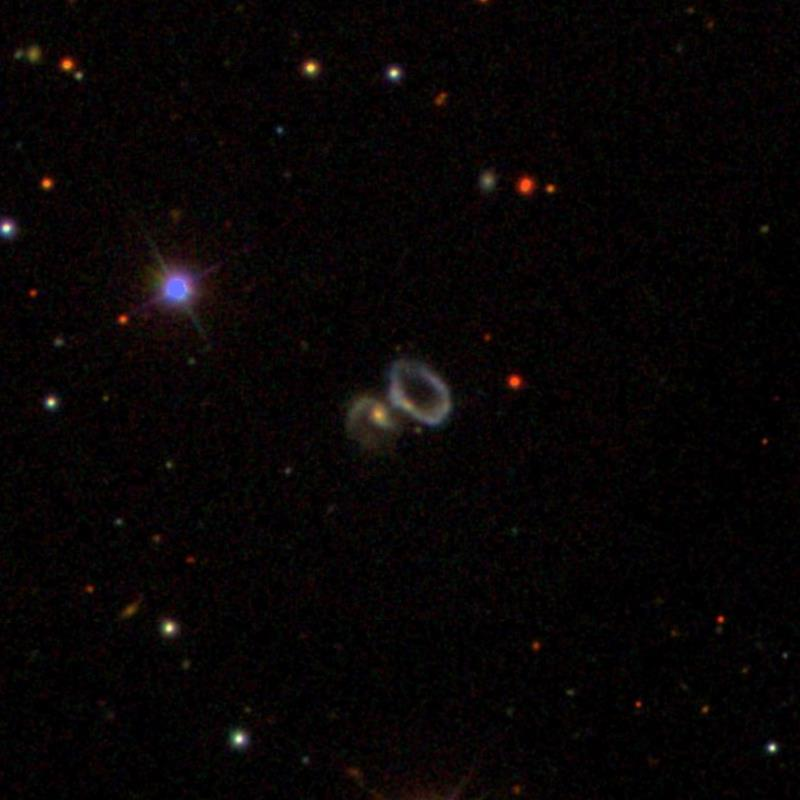

Observation data (J2000.0 epoch)
- Constellation: Cetus
- Right ascension: 00^{h} 06^{m} 44.4^{s}
- Declination: −06° 38′ 09.0″
- Redshift: 0.075440
- Heliocentric radial velocity: 22,616 km/s
- Distance: 1.05 Gly

Characteristics
- Type: RING

Other designations
- PGC 509 and PGC 510, Arp 146, VV 790

Arp 146 (known as PGC 509 and PGC 510) are a pair of interacting galaxies located 1.05 billion light-years away from Earth in the constellation Cetus. It was discovered by Dewhirst and catalogued by Boris Vorontsov-Velyaminov as VV 790. Under the Atlas of Peculiar Galaxies created by Halton Arp, they are categorized under galaxies that have associated rings.

Arp 146 is classified as an example of an empty ring galaxy. According to a study, one galaxy appears to have passed through another, leaving behind a ring formed from the bridge material and remnants of the nucleus. The ring is said to be 18"x11" elliptical measuring 20 kpc in diameter but separated from its companion.
