= NGC 4774 =

Galaxy in the constellation Canes Venatici)

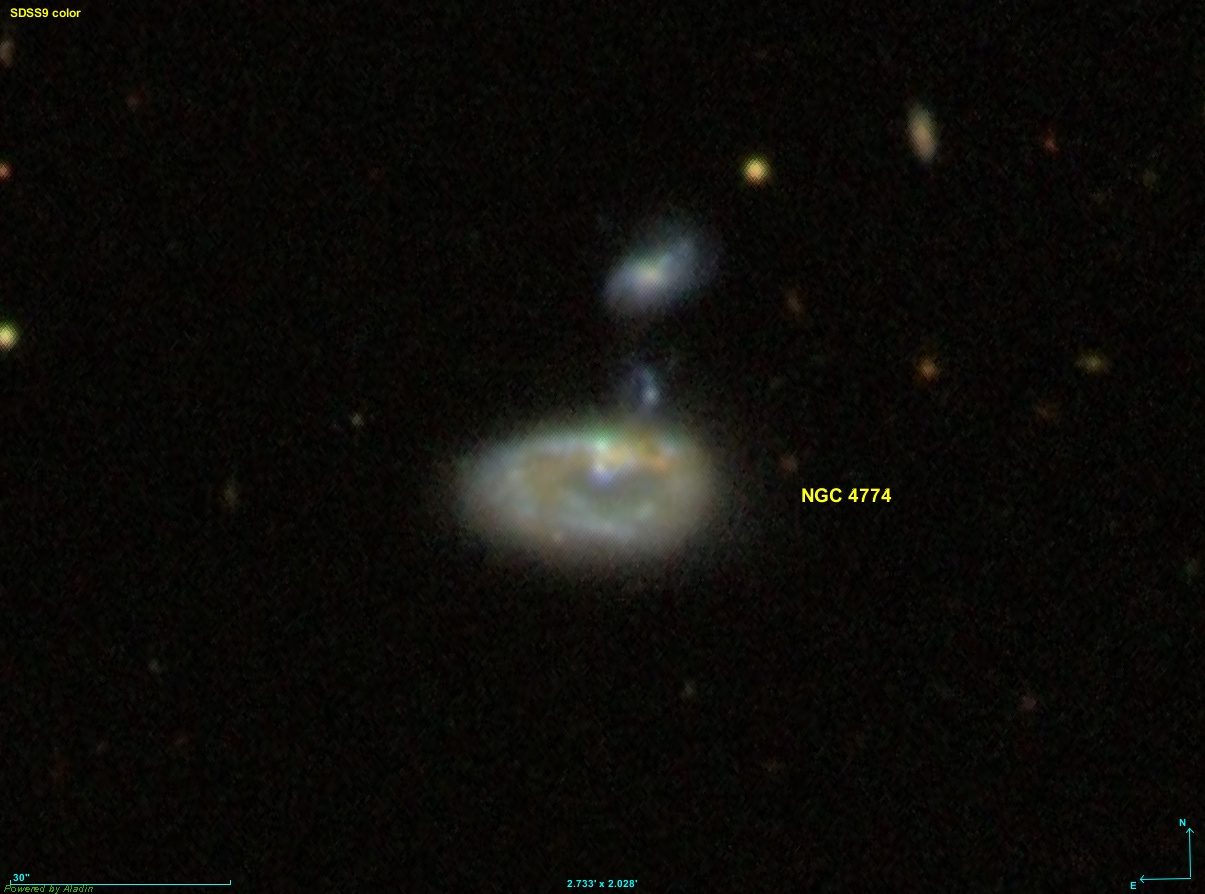
- The ring galaxy NGC 4774

Observation data (J2000 epoch)
- Constellation: Canes Venatici
- Right ascension: 12^{h} 53^{m} 06.6714^{s}
- Declination: +36° 49′ 06.59″
- Redshift: 0.027823
- Heliocentric radial velocity: 8341 ± 17 km/s
- Distance: 412.8 ± 28.9 Mly (126.56 ± 8.87 Mpc)
- Apparent magnitude (V): 14.3

Characteristics
- Type: RING?
- Size: ~74,800 ly (22.93 kpc) (estimated)
- Apparent size (V): 0.6′ × 0.4′

Other designations
- IRAS 12507+3705, MCG +06-28-037, PGC 43759, CGCG 188-026, VV 789

NGC 4774, also known as the Kidney Bean Galaxy, is a ring galaxy in the constellation of Canes Venatici. Its velocity with respect to the cosmic microwave background is 8581 ± 24 km/s, which corresponds to a Hubble distance of 126.56 ± 8.87 Mpc (~413 million light-years). It was discovered by German-British astronomer William Herschel on 17 March 1787.

== Supernovae ==
Two supernovae have been observed in NGC 4774:

- SN 2013he (Type II-P, mag. 16.5) was discovered by the Italian Supernovae Search Project on 9 December 2013.
- SN 2021cjd (Type II-P, mag. 20.2) was discovered by the Zwicky Transient Facility on 7 February 2021.

== See also ==
- List of NGC objects (4001–5000)
