= Arthur Hoag =

American astronomer

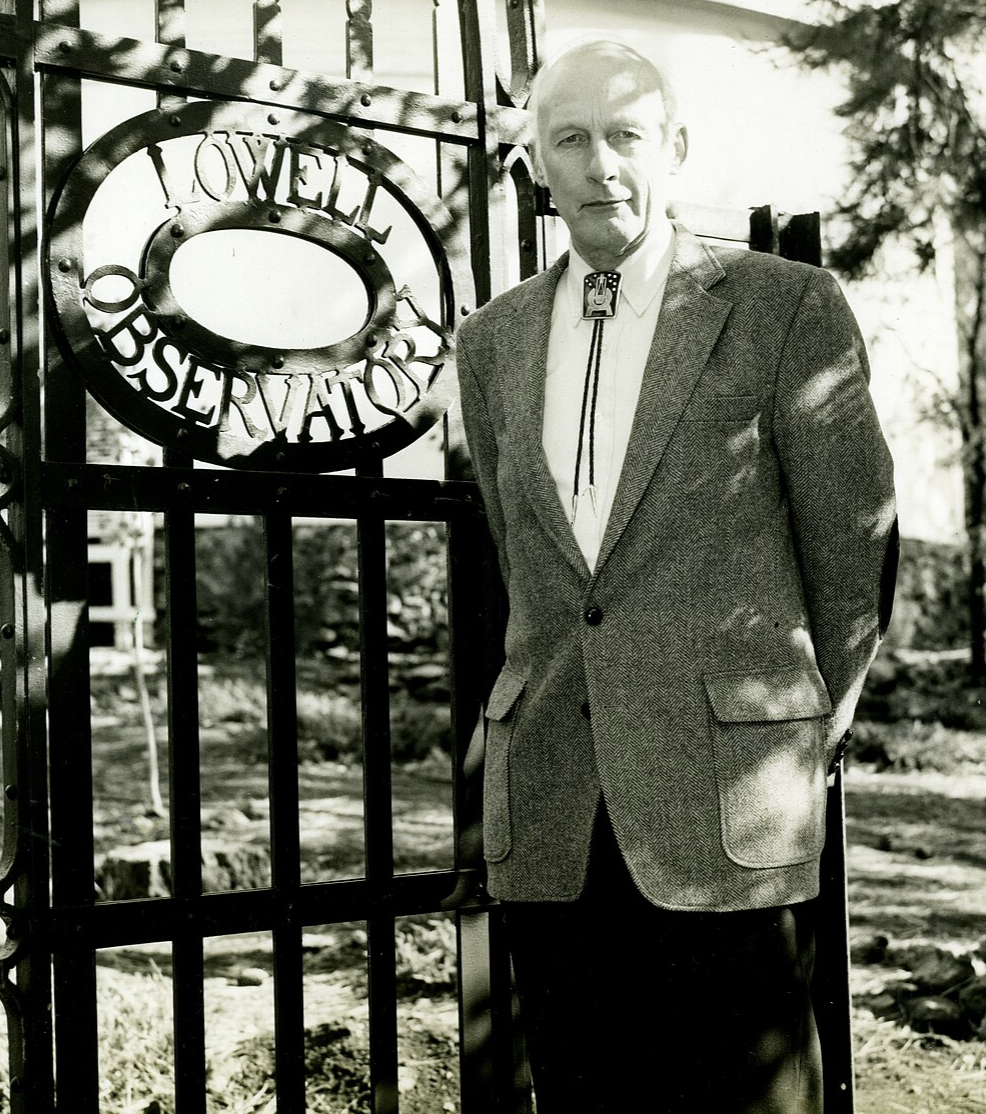
- Hoag at Lowell Observatory
- Born: January 28, 1921; Ann Arbor, Michigan, United States
- Died: July 17, 1999 (aged 78); Tucson, Arizona, United States
- Occupation: Astronomer
- Years active: 1952-1986
- Known for: Director of Lowell Observatory, discovery of Hoag's Object, one of the founders of dark-sky movement
- Spouse: Marjorie (Marge) B. Hoag
- Children: Stefanie, Tom
- Parent(s): Lynne Arthur Hoag and Wylma Wood Hoag

Academic background
- Education: Brown University (BA, 1942, physics); Harvard University (PhD, 1952, astronomy)
- Thesis: Some Applications of Direct Photoelectric Microphotometry (1952)
- Doctoral advisor: Bart Bok

Academic work
- Discipline: Astronomy
- Institutions: United States Naval Observatory; USNO Flagstaff Station; Kitt Peak National Observatory; Lowell Observatory

Arthur Allen Hoag (January 28, 1921 - July 17, 1999) was an American astronomer most famous for his discovery of Hoag's Object, an unusual ring galaxy, in 1950. He worked at the Naval Ordnance Laboratory, was director of the stellar division of Kitt Peak National Observatory and later the director of Lowell Observatory from 1977-1986. He was also one of the founders of the dark-sky movement.

== Early life and education ==
Hoag was born January 28, 1921, in Ann Arbor, Michigan, the son of Lynne Arthur Hoag (Harvard Medical School, Cornell, and University of Michigan faculty member) and Wylma Wood Hoag. He had two sisters, Mary Alice (born 1922) and Elizabeth Ruth (born 1919). His mother and sister Mary (aged 3) died on June 1, 1926, when the paddle steamer Washington Irving was rammed by an oil barge and sunk on the North River.

Hoag's interest in astronomy started in high school, and he went on to Brown University, where he was encouraged by Charles Smiley and graduated in 1942 with a B.A. in physics. He then went to work at the Naval Ordnance Laboratory working on subsurface weapons.

After WWII ended, he enrolled in the PhD program at Harvard's Department of Astronomy, where he was advised by Bart Bok. He completed his dissertation in 1952 on scanning photometry of spiral galaxies.

== Career ==
During his PhD program, Hoag was a research assistant for John S. Hall at the United States Naval Observatory (USNO). In 1955, he became the first director of the Flagstaff Station of the Observatory, where he oversaw the transfer to the station from Washington of a 40-inch telescope, conducted a mapping study of polarization in the Milky Way with John Hall, and conducted with others a photometry study of open clusters. He was also one of the first to experiment with cooled photographic emulsions.

He left USNO in 1966 to become director of the stellar division of Kitt Peak National Observatory. While there, he helped develop instrumentation for the 4-meter Mayall Telescope as well as developed the idea of a coudé feed for the 2.1-meter telescope, a means of directing light from a large mirror to a small telescope attached to a spectrograph. He also applied grism (combination diffraction grating and prism) spectroscopy to the study of quasars.

In 1977, Hoag became the fifth director of the Lowell Observatory, succeeding his mentor John Hall, a position he kept until his retirement in 1986. During his time at Lowell, he focused on improving its observational facilities as well as its financial security. He successfully guided the observatory through a time when the future of astronomical research was in question, both keeping research programs intact and starting Lowell's public program.

== Dark-sky movement ==
While at Lowell, Hoag was also one of the founders of the dark-sky movement, which seeks to reduce light pollution. In 1987, he tested low-pressure sodium lights on Santa Fe Avenue in Flagstaff, Arizona. This ultimately resulted in a mandate by the city to replace all mercury vapor lights, thus reducing sky glow, lowering energy requirements, and reducing the impact of light on the natural rhythms of animals and humans.

Regarding his work in this regard at Flagstaff, G.W. Lockwood, who took over the light control efforts at Lowell from him: "Thanks to Art’s careful and tactful efforts over the years, city officials and many citizens recognize the importance of astronomy to Arizona and Flagstaff, and understand the danger that unrestricted lighting poses to our work."

He headed up the International Astronomical Union's Commission 50, which was dedicated to preserving astronomical sites and observing conditions.

He was recognized as one of the pioneers of the dark-sky movement by DarkSky International, which named an award in his honor.

== Hoag's Object ==
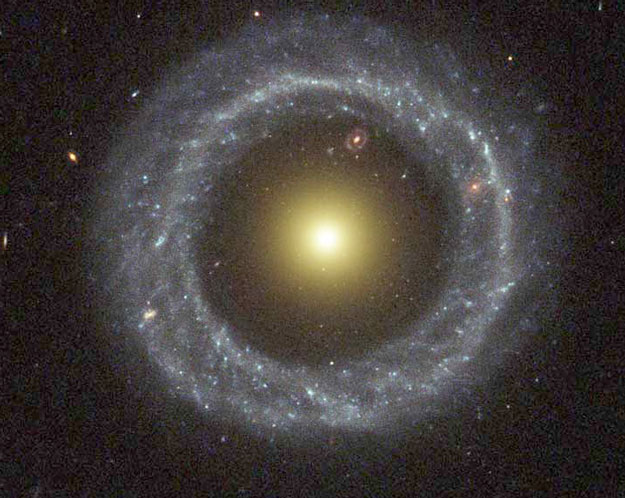
Hoag's Object, taken by the Hubble Space Telescope in July 2001

In addition to Hoag's other research, he is perhaps best known for discovering what would become known as Hoag's Object, an unusual ring galaxy in the constellation Serpens, an object some 120,000 light years (ly) across located 600 million ly away. He reported the object in 1950, noting that the object "appears to be a perfectly symmetrical planetary nebula", but with some characteristics that did not match the typical appearance of planetary nebulae. He also suggested that it could be "a new species among the 'pathological' galaxies." It is considered one of the finest, most perfect examples of a ring galaxy, and it is the prototype for the Hoag-type galaxies.

Although it is a ring galaxy, it is atypical, and the exact mechanism of its formation is not known. For example, ring galaxies can form as the aftermath of a collision between a small galaxy with a larger, disk-shaped galaxy. However, Hoag's object's center is spheroidal, not disk-shaped, as usually occurs.

== Personal life ==
Hoag married Marjorie Jane Paulison (1921-2007) in 1949. He had two children, three grandchildren, and one great-grandchild.

He was noted for his "legendary" sense of humor and for being "more interested in helping others succeed than in advancing his own interests". Robert Millis, the director of Lowell Observatory at the time of Hoag's death, noted that he "was probably one of the most popular people in the greater astronomical community. He was a real gentleman and very sensitive to the wants and needs of others."

He was active in the Flagstaff community and served on the board of trustees of the Museum of Northern Arizona and as a trustee of the Federated Community Church. He and his wife were both fans of the Northern Arizona University basketball program.

== Awards and honors ==
Hoag was a member of the International Astronomical Union and the American Astronomical Society (AAS). He served as AAS Councilor from 1966-1969 and AAS vice president from 1974-1976. The Hoag/Robinson Award, given annually by DarkSky International, was named in his and William T. Robinson's honor work as "pioneers in outdoor lighting reform", and for Hoag being one of the dark sky movement's pioneers.

Asteroid 3225 Hoag, discovered by Carolyn and Eugene Shoemaker, was named after him in December 1985.
