= LEDA 1000714 =

Hoag-type ring galaxy in the constellation Crater

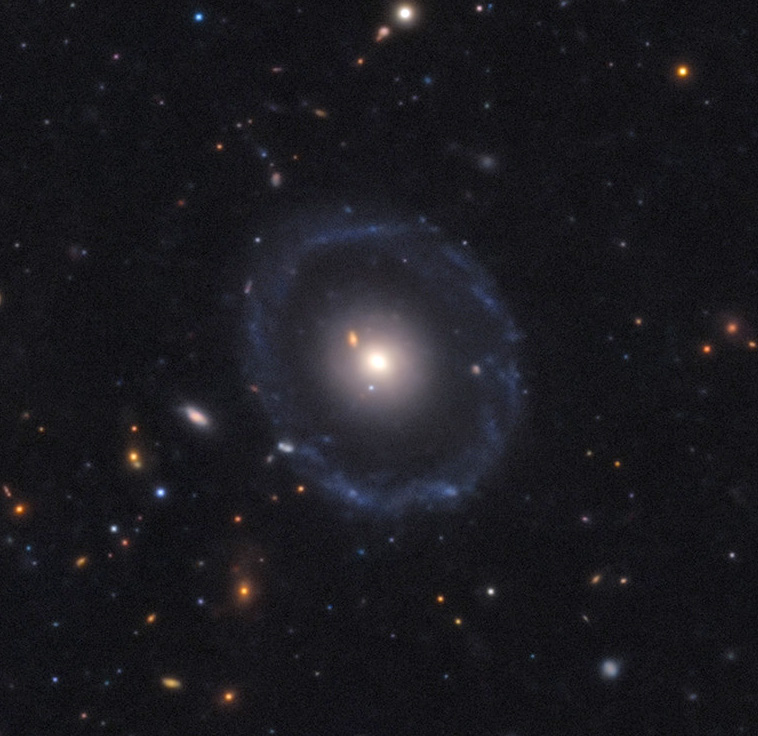
- Ground-based color picture from a 0.6m telescope.

Observation data (J2000 epoch)
- Constellation: Crater
- Right ascension: 11^{h} 23^{m} 16.435^{s}
- Declination: −08° 40′ 06.72″
- Redshift: 0.025741
- Heliocentric radial velocity: 7717 ± 38
- Distance: 360 Mly (110 Mpc)
- Apparent magnitude (V): Core: 15.39; Outer ring: 17.72
- Apparent magnitude (B): Core: 16.36; Outer ring: 18.09; Inner ring: 20.85
- Absolute magnitude (V): Core: -19.43; Outer ring:-17.07

Characteristics
- Type: Core: E (R)SAa
- Apparent size (V): Core: 7.8 kly (2.4 kpc) (6.20"); Outer ring: 51 kly (15.6 kpc); Inner ring: 20 kly (6 kpc)
- Notable features: Rare double-ringed Hoag-type galaxy

Other designations
- 6dFGS gJ112316.4-084007, 2MASX J11231643-0840067, PGC 1000714

LEDA 1000714 is a ring galaxy in the constellation Crater. LEDA 1000714 is one of a very rare group of galaxies called Hoag-type galaxies, named after the prototype, Hoag's Object – it is estimated that roughly 0.1% of all galaxies are this type.

LEDA 1000714 is unusual because it is a Hoag-type galaxy with two nearly round rings, but with different characteristics. It has been nicknamed Burçin's Galaxy, after Burçin Mutlu-Pakdil, the leader of the photometric study of this galaxy.

== Structure ==
The structure and photometry of LEDA 1000714 was studied with significant detail in 2017. The core of the galaxy appears to be similar to an elliptical galaxy, and is almost perfectly round, not flattened into a disk. Unlike some ring galaxies, the central core shows no signs of a bar structure connecting the outer ring to the center of the galaxy. This is similar to Hoag's Object, and a number of other galaxies have been found that have a perfectly round center.

The outer galaxy is relatively bright and contains many luminous stars indicative of star formation. However, upon further inspection of the galaxy, it was found that inside the outer ring there is also a faint, diffuse, red inner ring closer to the core. The outer ring appears to be fairly young, at about 0.13 billion years old, while the core is much older, at 5.5 billion years old. The age of the inner ring is, as yet, undetermined. This makes the galaxy even more unusual, possibly making it one of a kind.

The details of the formation of Hoag-type objects are still largely unknown. It has been suggested that the near-perfect core of Hoag's Object formed from a sort of "bar instability" where the central bar structure decays into a rounder core. It may also be due to another galaxy. In the case of LEDA 1000714, because its two rings have significantly different ages, the galaxy's morphology may have come from an anomalous collision with another galaxy, however more data is needed to draw conclusions.

== See also ==
- Hoag's Object
- UGC 4599
- NGC 6028
- NGC 7742
