= NGC 2859 =

Galaxy in the constellation Leo Minor

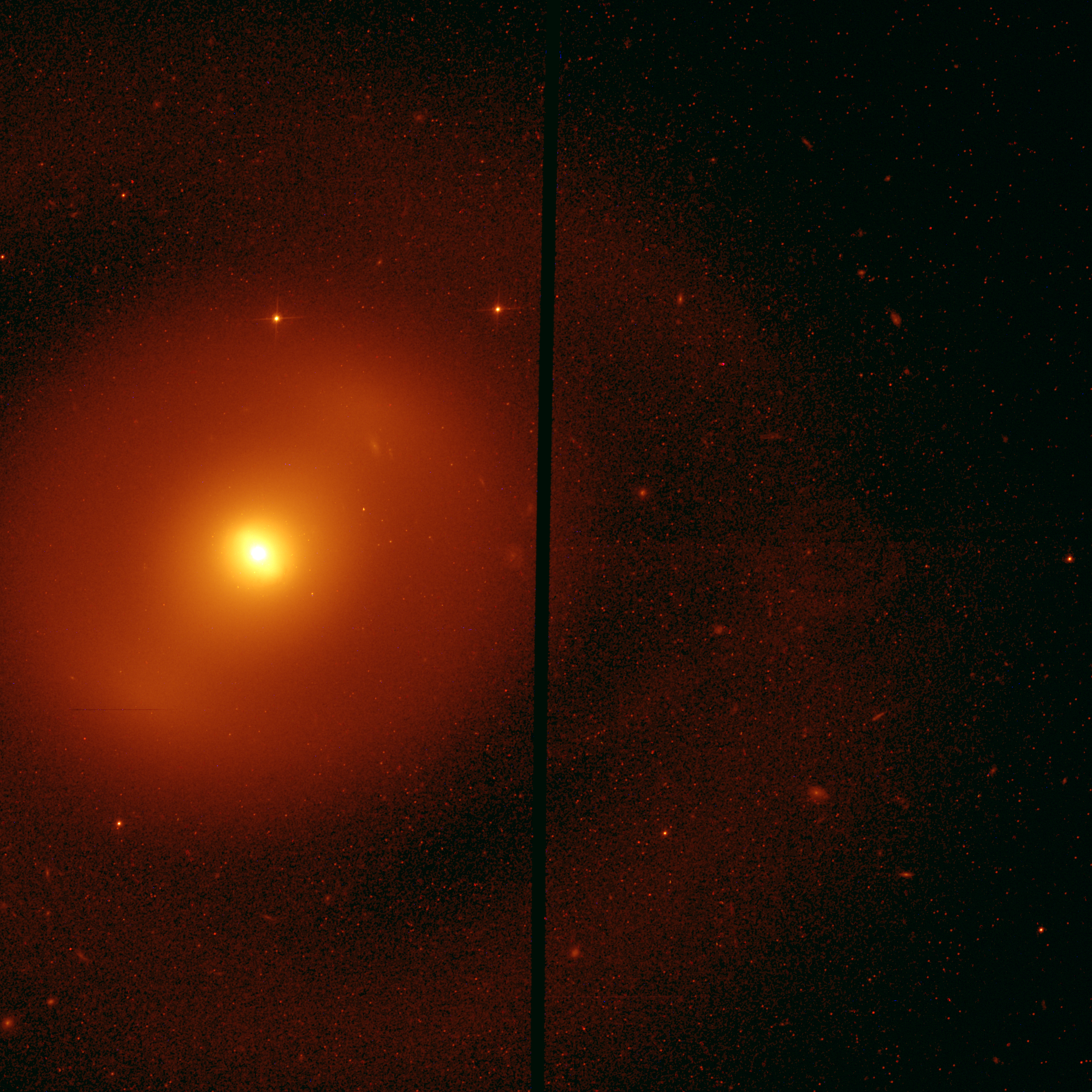
- NGC 2859 imaged by the Hubble Space Telescope

Observation data (J2000 epoch)
- Constellation: Leo Minor
- Right ascension: 09^{h} 24^{m} 18.549^{s}
- Declination: +34° 30′ 48.16″
- Redshift: 1,687±8 km/s km/s
- Distance: 82.8 Mly (25.4 Mpc)
- Apparent magnitude (V): 10.9

Characteristics
- Type: (R)SB(r)0^{+}
- Apparent size (V): 4.6 × 4.1
- Notable features: Double barred

Other designations
- NGC 2859, UGC 5001, PGC 26649

NGC 2859 is a barred lenticular galaxy located some 83 million light years away in the constellation Leo Minor. The morphological classification is (R)SB(r)0^{+}, where the S0^{+} notation indicates a well-defined physical structure that is lacking in visible spiral arms. It has a strong bar (B) of the "ansae" type, which means it grows brighter or wider toward the tips. A faint, secondary bar is positioned at nearly a right angle to the main bar. These features are surrounded by a weak inner ring (r) that appears diffuse. The outer region of the galaxy hosts a prominent, detached ring (R) that includes a series of blue-hued knots along the eastern side.

The central supermassive black hole is an estimated 105 million times the mass of the Sun. The nucleus is tentatively classified as a transition type T2:, with no indication of activity.
