= NGC 7742 =

Galaxy in the constellation Pegasus

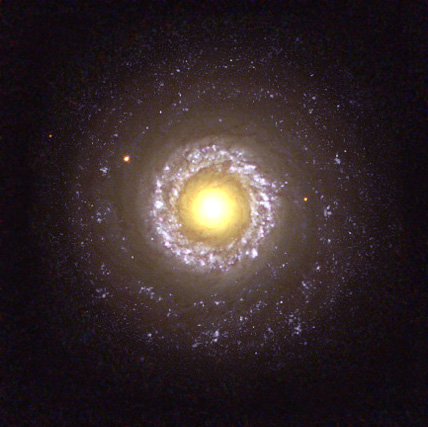
- A Hubble Space Telescope (HST) image of NGC 7742. Credit: NASA/ESA/STScI/AURA.

Observation data (J2000 epoch)
- Constellation: Pegasus
- Right ascension: 23^{h} 44^{m} 15.7425^{s}
- Declination: +10° 46′ 01.3″
- Redshift: 0.005547±0.000003
- Heliocentric radial velocity: 1663±1 km/s
- Galactocentric velocity: 1809±6 km/s
- Distance: 72.4 ± 6.2 Mly (22.20 ± 1.90 Mpc)
- Apparent magnitude (V): 12.35

Characteristics
- Type: SA(r)b, LINER/HII
- Size: ~50,700 ly (15.55 kpc) (estimated)
- Apparent size (V): 1.778 × 1.698 moa

Other designations
- UZC J234415.8+104601, IRAS 23417+1029, 2MASX J23441571+1046015, UGC 12760, MCG +02-60-010, PGC 72260, CGCG 432-023
- References: SIMBAD: Search NGC 7742 data

NGC 7742 (also known as the Fried Egg Galaxy) is a face-on unbarred spiral galaxy in the constellation Pegasus. Its velocity with respect to the cosmic microwave background is 1292 ± 26 km/s, which corresponds to a Hubble distance of 62.2 ± 4.5 Mly (19.06 ± 1.39 Mpc). In addition, six non-redshift measurements give a farther distance of 84.09 ± 26.51 Mly (25.783 ± 8.129 Mpc). It was discovered by astronomer William Herschel on 18 Oct 1784.

NGC 7742 is unusual in that it contains a ring but no bar. Typically, bars are needed to produce a ring structure. The bars' gravitational forces move gas to the ends of the bars, where it forms into the rings seen in many barred spiral galaxies. In this galaxy, however, no bar is present, so this mechanism cannot be used to explain the formation of the ring. O. K. Sil'chenko and A. V. Moiseev proposed the ring was formed partly as the result of a merger event in which a smaller gas-rich dwarf galaxy collided with NGC 7742. As evidence for this, they point to the unusually bright central region, the presence of highly inclined central gas disk, and the presence of gas that is counterrotating (or rotating in the opposite direction) with respect to the stars. It is also classified as a Type II Seyfert Galaxy.

== Supernovae ==
Two supernovae have been observed in NGC 7742:

- SN 1993R (Type II, mag. 17) was discovered by the Leuschner Observatory Supernova Search (LOSS) on 2 June 1993.
- SN 2014cy (Type II-P, mag. 16.2) was discovered by Ken'ichi Nishimura on 31 August 2014.

== See also ==
- NGC 7217 – a face-on spiral galaxy with identical characteristics
- Sombrero Galaxy – a similar galaxy with a dust ring
- Hoag's Object – a similar unusual galaxy with a ring

== Gallery ==
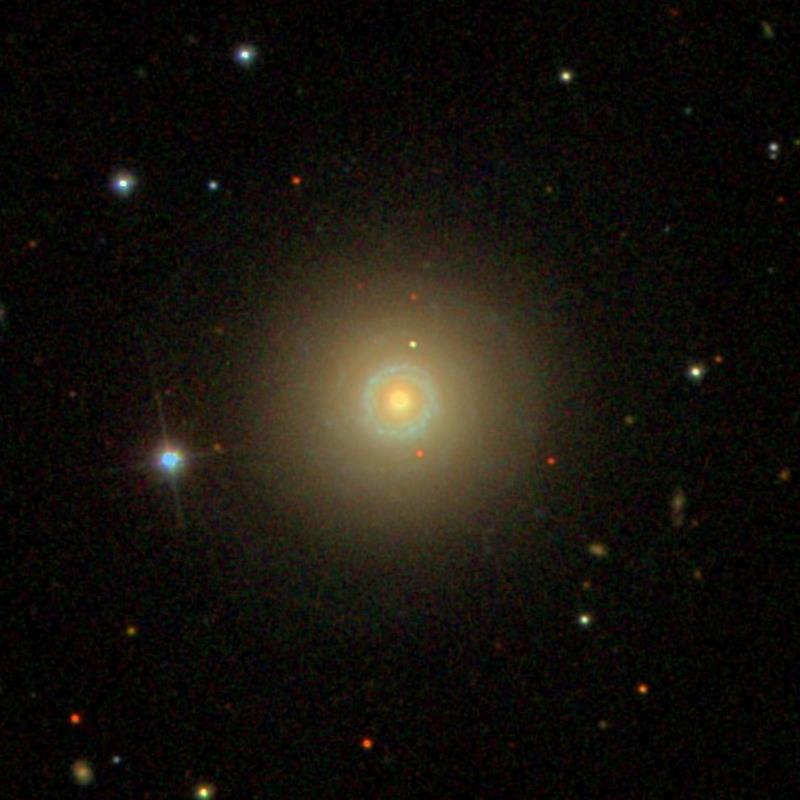
NGC 7742 (SDSS DR14)
