= Cartwheel Galaxy =

Galaxy in the constellation Sculptor

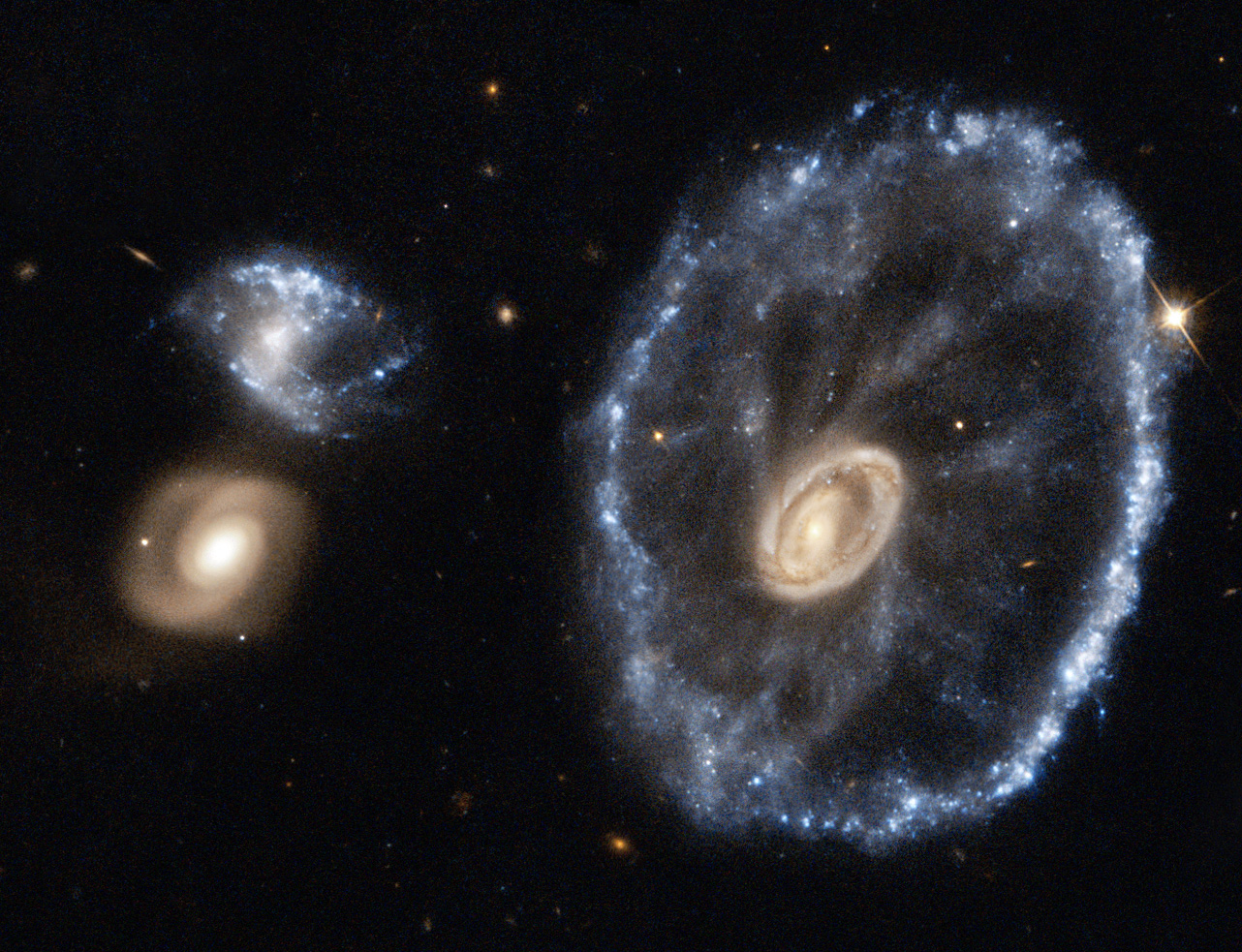
- The Cartwheel Galaxy as seen from the Hubble Space Telescope. The upper left galaxy is PGC 2249; the lower left is PGC 2252.

Observation data (J2000 epoch)
- Constellation: Sculptor
- Right ascension: 00^{h} 37^{m} 41.1368^{s}
- Declination: −33° 42′ 58.712″
- Redshift: 0.030187±0.00001
- Heliocentric radial velocity: 9,050±3 km/s
- Distance: ~500 million ly (150 Mpc)
- Apparent magnitude (V): 15.18

Characteristics
- Type: S pec (Ring)
- Size: 57.69 kpc (188,200 ly) (diameter; 25.0 mag/arcsec^{2} B-band isophote)
- Apparent size (V): 1.1′ × 0.9′
- Notable features: Ring shape

Other designations
- ESO 350- G 040, IRAS 00352-3359, MCG -06-02-022A, PGC 2248, VV 784

The Cartwheel Galaxy (catalogue ESO 350-40 and PGC 2248) is a lenticular ring galaxy around 500 million light-years away in the constellation Sculptor. It has a D_{25} isophotal diameter of 57.69 kiloparsecs (188,200 light-years), and a mass of about 2.9–4.8 billion solar masses; its outer ring has a circular velocity of 217 km/s.

It was discovered by Fritz Zwicky in 1941. Zwicky considered his discovery "one of the most complicated structures awaiting its explanation on the basis of stellar dynamics."

The Third Reference Catalogue of Bright Galaxies (RC3) measured a D_{25} isophotal diameter for the Cartwheel Galaxy at about 60.9 arcseconds, giving it a diameter of 57.69 kiloparsecs (188,200 light-years) based on a redshift-derived distance of 132.2 megaparsecs (431 million light-years). This diameter is slightly larger than that of the Andromeda Galaxy.

The large Cartwheel Galaxy is the dominant member of the Cartwheel Galaxy group, consisting of four physically associated spiral galaxies. The three companions are referred to in several studies as G1, the smaller irregular blue Magellanic spiral; G2, the yellow compact spiral with a tidal tail; and G3, a more distant spiral often seen in wide field images.

One supernova has been observed in the Cartwheel Galaxy. SN 2021afdx (Type II, mag. 18.796) was discovered by ATLAS on 23 November 2021.

== Structures ==
The structure of the Cartwheel Galaxy is noted to be highly complicated and heavily disturbed. The Cartwheel consists of two rings: the outer ring, the site of massive ongoing star formation due to gas and dust compression; and the inner ring that surrounds the galactic center. A ring of dark absorbing dust is also present in the nucleic ring. Several optical arms or "spokes" are seen connecting the outer ring to the inner. Observations show the presence of both non-thermal radio continuum and optical spokes, but the two do not seem to overlap.

== Evolution ==
The galaxy was once a normal spiral galaxy before it apparently underwent a head-on "bullseye" style collision with a smaller companion approximately 200–300 million years prior to how we see the system today. When the nearby galaxy passed through the Cartwheel Galaxy, the force of the collision caused a powerful gravitational shock wave to expand through the galaxy. Moving at high speed, the shock wave swept up and compressed gas and dust, creating a starburst region around the galaxy's center portion that went unscathed as it expanded outwards. This explains the bluish ring around the center, which is the brighter portion. It can be noted that the galaxy is beginning to retake the form of a normal spiral galaxy, with arms spreading out from a central core. These arms are often referred to as the cartwheel's "spokes".

Alternatively, a model based on the gravitational Jeans instability of both axisymmetric (radial) and nonaxisymmetric (spiral) small-amplitude gravity perturbations allows an association between growing clumps of matter and the gravitationally unstable axisymmetric and nonaxisymmetric waves which take on the appearance of a ring and spokes. Based on observational data, however, this theory of ring galaxy evolution does not appear to apply to this specific galaxy.

While most images of the Cartwheel display three galaxies close together, a fourth physically associated companion (also known as G3) is known to be associated with the group through an HI (neutral hydrogen) tail that connects G3 to the cartwheel. Due to the presence of the HI tail, it is widely believed that G3 is the "bullet" galaxy that plunged through the disk of the cartwheel, creating its current shape, not G1 or G2. This hypothesis makes sense given the size and predicted age of the current structure (~300 million years old as mentioned before). Considering how close G1 and G2 are to the Cartwheel still, it is believed much more widely that the roughly 88 kpc (~287,000 light years)-distant G3 is the intruding galaxy.

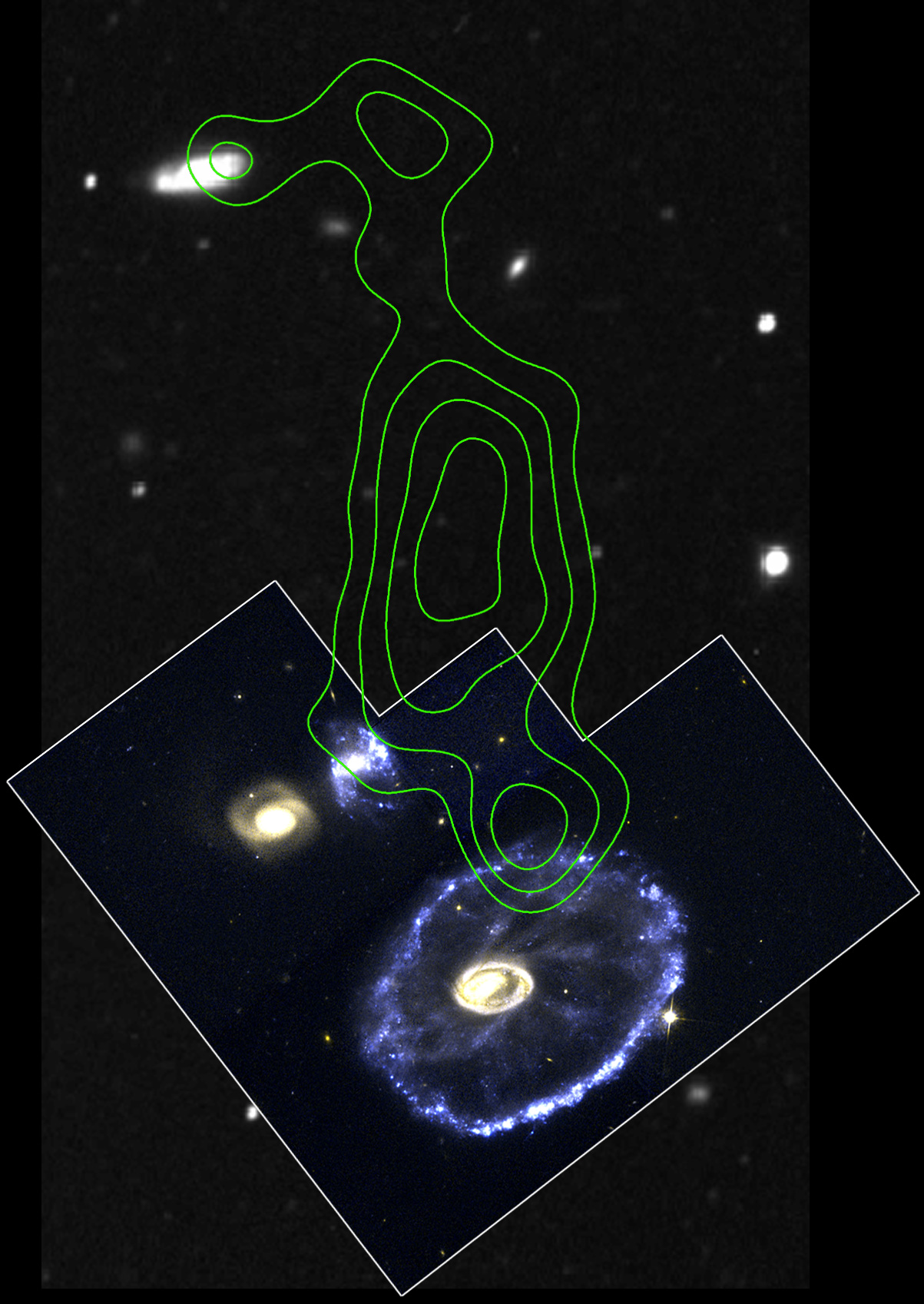
The collision path done by the smaller galaxy

HI tail mapping is extremely useful in determining "culprit" galaxies in similar cases where the solution is relatively unclear. Hydrogen gas, being the lightest and most abundant gas in galaxies, is easily torn away from parent galaxies through gravitational forces. Evidence of this can be seen in the Jellyfish Galaxy and the Comet Galaxy, which are undergoing a type of gravitational effect called ram pressure stripping, and other galaxies with tidal tails and star-forming stellar streams associated with collisions and mergers. Ram-pressure stripping almost always causes trailing-dominant tails of HI gas as a galaxy falls into a galaxy cluster, while mergers and collisions like the ones involving in Cartwheel galaxy often create leading-dominant tails as the culprit galaxy's gravity attracts and pulls on the victim galaxy's gas in the direction of the culprit's motion.

The existing structure of the cartwheel is expected to disintegrate over the next few hundred million years as the remaining gas, dust and stars that have not escaped the galaxy begin to back in towards the center. It is likely that the galaxy will regain a spiral shape after the in fall process completes and spiral density waves have a chance to reform. This is only possible if companions G1, G2 and G3 remain distant and do not undergo an additional collision with the cartwheel.

== X-ray sources ==
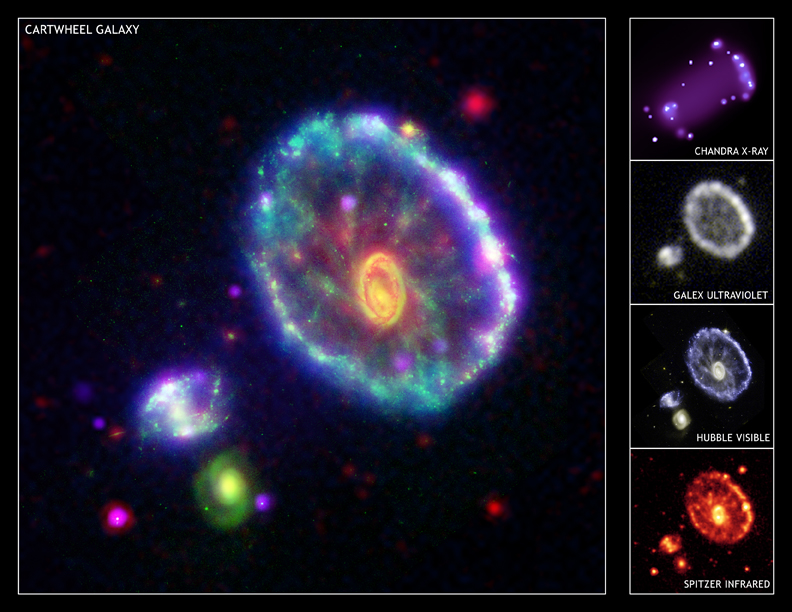
The Cartwheel Galaxy in different light spectra (X-ray, ultraviolet, visible, and infrared). The image combines data from four different space-based observatories: the Chandra X-ray Observatory (purple), the Galaxy Evolution Explorer (ultraviolet/blue), the Hubble Space Telescope (visible/green), and the Spitzer Space Telescope (infrared/red). Image is 160 arcsec across in angular diameter. RA 00^{h} 37^{m} 41.10^{s} Dec −33° 42′ 58.80″ in Sculptor. Credit: NASA/JPL/Caltech/P.Appleton et al. X-ray: NASA/CXC/A.Wolter & G.Trinchieri et al.

The unusual shape of the Cartwheel Galaxy may be due to a collision with smaller galaxy such as one of those in the lower left of the image. Star formation via starburst galaxies, such as the Cartwheel Galaxy, results in the formation of large and extremely luminous stars, the most recent of which has lit up the Cartwheel rim. When massive stars explode as supernovas, they leave behind neutron stars and black holes. Some of these neutron stars and black holes have nearby companion stars, and become powerful sources of X-rays as they pull matter off their companions (also known as ultra and hyperluminous X-ray sources). The brightest X-ray sources are likely black holes with companion stars, appearing as the white dots that lie along the rim of the X-ray image. The Cartwheel contains an exceptionally large number of these black hole binary X-ray sources, because many massive stars formed in the ring.

== See also ==
- Mayall's object
- Whirlpool galaxy
- NGC 2207 and IC 2163
- Ring galaxy
