= Hoag's Object =

Galaxy in the constellation Serpens Caput

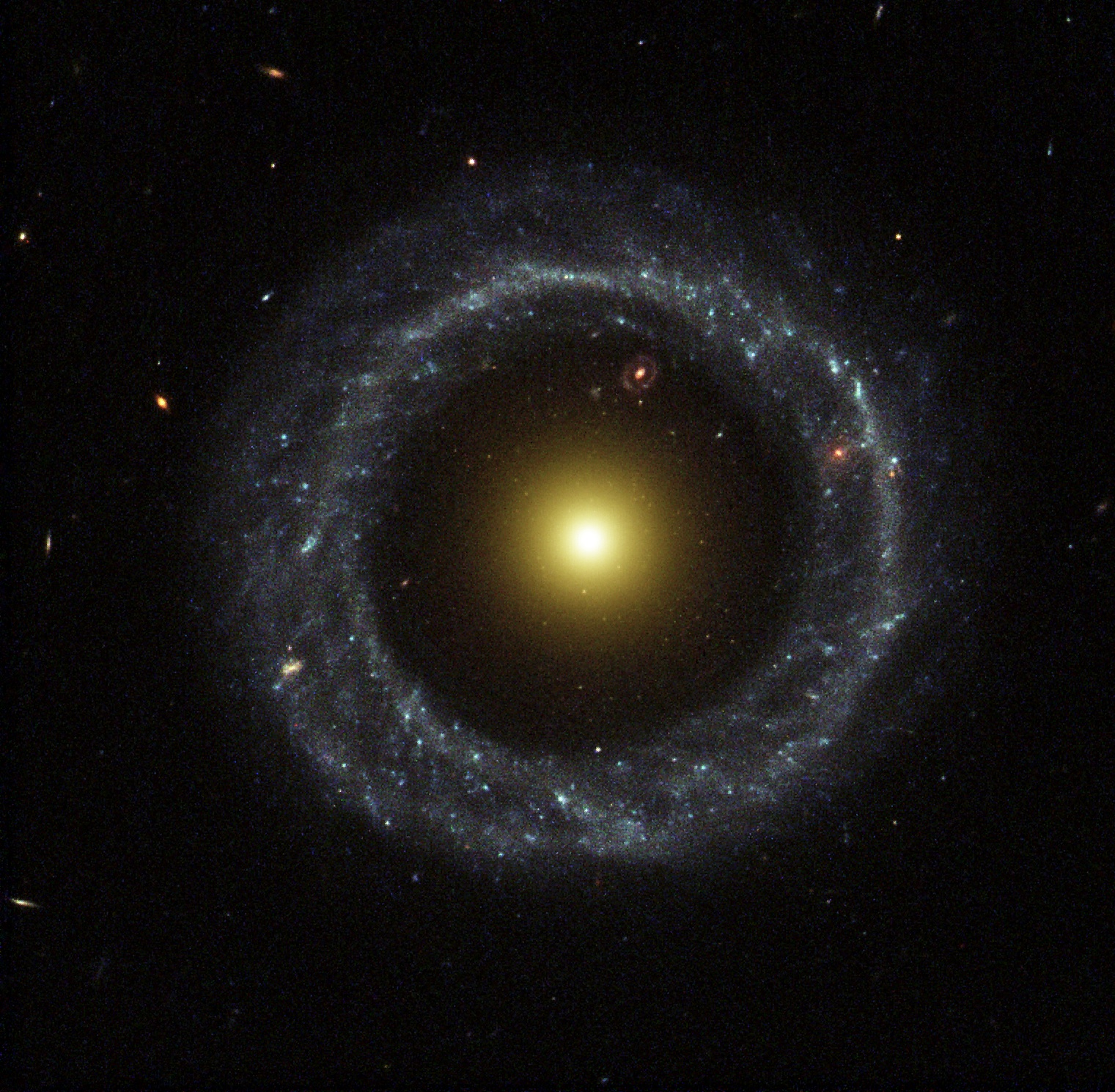
- Hoag's Object, taken by the Hubble Space Telescope in July 2001

Observation data (J2000 epoch)
- Constellation: Serpens Caput
- Right ascension: 15^{h} 17^{m} 14.407^{s}
- Declination: +21° 35′ 07.856″
- Redshift: 0.042423±0.000009
- Heliocentric radial velocity: 12,718±3 km/s
- Galactocentric velocity: 12,795±4 km/s
- Distance: 594.3 ± 41.75 Mly (182.2 ± 12.8 Mpc)h^{−1}_{0.6774} (Comoving); 558 Mly (171.1 Mpc)h^{−1}_{0.6774} (Light-travel)
- Apparent magnitude (V): 15.1
- Apparent magnitude (B): 16.2
- Magnitude (J): 14.230±0.046
- Magnitude (H): 13.536±0.046
- Magnitude (K): 13.230±0.044

Characteristics
- Type: (RP)E0 or (RP)SA0/a
- Size: 148,110 ly × 87,377 ly (45.41 kpc × 26.79 kpc) (diameter; 25.0 B-mag arcsec^{−2}) (Note: The quoted diameter in this infobox was based on NED's provided scale "Virgo + GA + Shapley" of 883 parsecs/arcsec multiplied with given angular diameters.); 100,550 ly × 86,464 ly (30.83 kpc × 26.51 kpc) (diameter; "total" magnitude)
- Apparent size (V): 0.342357′ × 0.31757′
- Notable features: Ring galaxy

Other designations
- PRC D-51, PGC 54559

Hoag's Object is an unusual ring galaxy in the constellation of Serpens Caput. It is named after Arthur Hoag, who discovered it in 1950 and identified it as either a planetary nebula or a peculiar galaxy. The galaxy has a D_{25} isophotal diameter of 45.41 kiloparsecs (148,000 light-years).

== Characteristics ==
A nearly perfect ring of young hot blue stars circles the older yellow nucleus of this ring galaxy c. 600 million light-years away in the constellation Serpens. The ring structure is so perfect and circular that it has been referred to as "The most perfect ring galaxy". The diameter of the 6 arcsecond inner core of the galaxy is about 17±0.7 kly (5.3±0.2 kpc) while the surrounding ring has an inner 28″ diameter of 75±3 kly (24.8±1.1 kpc) and an outer 45″ diameter of 121±4 kly (39.9±1.7 kpc). The galaxy is estimated to have a mass of 700 billion suns. By comparison, the Milky Way galaxy has an estimated diameter of around 100 kly and consists of between 100 and 400 billion stars and a mass between 800 billion and 1.54 trillion suns.

The gap separating the two stellar populations may contain some star clusters that are almost too faint to see. Though ring galaxies are rare, another more distant ring galaxy can be seen through Hoag's Object, between the nucleus and the outer ring of the galaxy, at roughly the one o'clock position in the image shown here.

Noah Brosch and colleagues showed that the luminous ring lies at the inner edge of a much larger neutral hydrogen ring.

A few other galaxies share the primary characteristics of Hoag's Object, including a bright detached ring of stars, but their centers are elongated or barred, and they may exhibit some spiral structure. While none match Hoag's Object in symmetry, these galaxies are sometimes called Hoag-type galaxies.

== History and formation ==
Even though Hoag's Object was clearly shown on the Palomar Star Survey, it was not included in either the Morphological Catalogue of Galaxies, the Catalogue of Galaxies and Clusters of Galaxies, or the catalogue of galactic planetary nebulae.

In the initial announcement of his discovery, Hoag proposed the hypothesis that the visible ring was a product of gravitational lensing. This idea was later discarded because the nucleus and the ring have the same redshift, and because more advanced telescopes revealed the ring's knotty structure, which would not be visible if the galaxy were a product of gravitational lensing.

Many of the galaxy's details remain mysterious, foremost of which is how it formed. So-called "classic" ring galaxies are generally formed by the collision of a small galaxy with a larger disk-shaped galaxy, producing a density wave in the disk that leads to a characteristic ring-like appearance. Such an event would have happened at least 2–3 billion years ago, and may have resembled the processes that form polar-ring galaxies. However, there is no sign of any second galaxy that would have acted as the "bullet", and the likely older core of Hoag's Object has a very low velocity relative to the ring, making the typical formation hypothesis implausible. Observations with one of the most sensitive telescopes have also failed to uncover any faint galaxy fragments that should be observable in a collision scenario. However, a team of scientists that analyzes the galaxy admits that "if the carnage happened more than 3 billion years ago, there might not be any detritus left to see."

Noah Brosch suggested that Hoag's Object might be a product of an extreme "bar instability" that occurred a few billion years ago in a barred spiral galaxy. Schweizer et al. claim this is an unlikely hypothesis because the nucleus of the object is spheroidal, whereas the nucleus of a barred spiral galaxy is disc-shaped, among other reasons. However, they admit evidence is somewhat thin for this particular dispute to be settled satisfactorily.

== See also ==
- LEDA 1000714
- UGC 4599
- NGC 6028
- NGC 7742
