= List of polar-ring galaxies =

The following table lists polar-ring galaxies:

== List ==
| Image | Galaxy | Base galaxy type | Notes |
|---|---|---|---|
| | NGC 2685 (UGC 4666, Arp 336, Helix Galaxy) | Lenticular (S0) | |
| | NGC 4650A (ESO 322-IG69, AM 1241-402) | Lenticular (S0) | |
| | NGC 660 | Lenticular (S0) or Barred Spiral (SBa) | |
| NGC 5122 PanS | NGC 5122 | Lenticular (S0) or (S0/a pec) | |
| | A0136-0801 | Lenticular (S0) | |
| | AM 1934-563 | Barred Spiral (SBa/b) | |
| | ESO 415-G26 (AM 0226-320) | Lenticular (S0) | |
| | UGC 5119 (LEDA 27383) | Elliptical | |
| | UGC 7576 | Lenticular (S0) | |
| | UGC 9796 (II Zwicky 73) | Lenticular (S0) | |
| | AM 2020-504 | Elliptical | |
| | SPRC-56 (PGC 54198, MCG +06-33-026) | Lenticular (S0) | |
| | SPRC-16 (LEDA 3531504, 2MASX J09420737+3624171) | Early-type (E/S0) | |
| | SPRC-37 (LEDA 2354098, 2MASX J12530977+4948325) | Early-type (E/S0) | |
| | SPRC-48 (LEDA 1809073) | Early-type (E/S0) | |
| | SPRC-20 (LEDA 1265503) | Late-type (Sc) | |
| | SPRC-55 (LEDA 1502142) | Early-type (E/S0) | |
| | SPRC-63 (LEDA 4480458) | Early-type (E/S0) | |
| | SPRC-7 (LEDA 3444084) | Late-type (Sc) | |
| | SPRC-17 (LEDA 1509749) | Transition type (S0-a) | |
| | SRPC-9 (LEDA 1669648) | Early-type (E/S0) | |
| | SPRC-69 (PGC 65406, II ZW 092) | Barred spiral (SBab) | |
| | SPRC-49 (LEDA 3822631) | Transitional type (S0-a) | |
| | SPRC-3 (LEDA 984444) | Early-type (E/S0) | |
| | SPRC-10 (LEDA 1489167) | Early-type (E/S0) | |
| | SPRC-31 (LEDA 1950727, 2MASX J12171148+3130377) | Early-type (E/S0) | |
| | SPRC-35 (LEDA 4339482, SDSS J124414.98+170049.1) | Early-type (E/S0) | |
| | SPRC-1 (LEDA 3099131) | Early-type (E/S0) | |
| | SPRC-57 (LEDA 1816450) | Early-type (E/S0) | |
| | SPRC-58 (LEDA 2545162) | Spiral without bar (Sa) | |
| | SPRC-59 (LEDA 3850651) | Transition type (S0-a) | |
| | LEDA 222315 | | |

== Inner Polar Rings ==
Some galaxies feature a "polar ring" within the disk of the galaxy:

- UGC 5600

== See also ==
- Lists of astronomical objects
- List of galaxies
