= ESO 415-G26 =

Lenticular galaxy in the constellation of Fornax

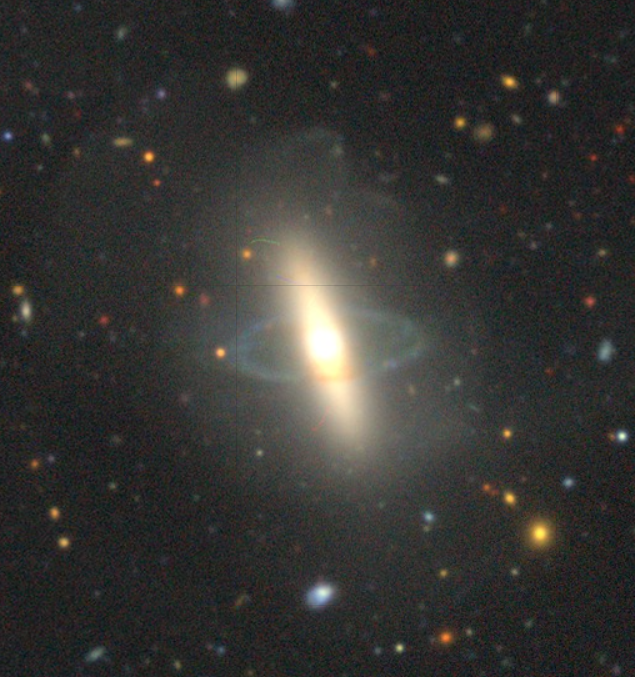
- ESO 415-G26 imaged with DESI Legacy Surveys

Observation data (J2000 epoch)
- Constellation: Fornax
- Right ascension: 02^{h} 28^{m} 20.10^{s}
- Declination: −31° 52′ 51.59″
- Redshift: 0.015357
- Heliocentric radial velocity: 4,604 km/s ± 14
- Distance: 210 Mly
- Apparent magnitude (B): 14.6

Characteristics
- Type: S0^0^: pec
- Size: ~158,000 ly (48.3 kpc) (estimated)

Other designations
- 2dFGRS S463Z190, AM 0226-320, PRC A-02, PGC 9408, MCG -05-07-001, 6dF J0228201-315252

ESO 415-G26 is a peculiar lenticular galaxy located in the constellation of Fornax. The redshift of the object is (z) 0.015 and it was first documented by B.A. Vorontsov-Vel'Yaminov in the Morphological Catalogue of Galaxies in 1968, where it was designated as MCG-05-07-001. This galaxy has also been classified as a polar ring galaxy.

== Description ==
ESO 415-G26 is a polar ring galaxy. It has a nearly edge-on appearance, with the entire galaxy being a dominant luminous component. The central nucleus of the galaxy is reddened and its polar ring structure is mainly bluer compared to its host galaxy. Neutral hydrogen is located along the position angle of the polar ring axis. The total H I mass is estimated to be around 5.6 × 10^{9} M_{☉}. The distribution of H I gas is mainly asymmetric, with the central peak offset from its optical center. The contour lines of the H I gas are round when compared to the optical ring, extending outwards in a butterfly-like shape. A further study also found the H I gas is extended as well, and described as face-on with some kind of a spiral-like structure in the contour areas.

A study published in 2000, found the polar ring structure of ESO 415-G26 is less extended when compared to its own stellar disk. Furthermore, there is a loop feature seen on the northern side of the galaxy, about 43 arcseconds from the nucleus and also shell features in the northwest direction. A faint outer envelope is seen extending outwards from the galaxy's main body. This is likely to be classified as stellar debris that resulted from the merger of a small gas-rich galaxy and a lenticular galaxy around one to three billion years ago. The galaxy rotation curve of the polar ring structure is extended further than that seen in NGC 4650A in terms of linear measure, with the eastern side of the curve depicted as mainly flat. The total estimated mass of the outermost radius is around 1.2 × 10^{10} M_{☉}.

One small companion, PGC 9331, is known to lie 310 kiloparsecs away from ESO 415-G26, with its redshift shown to differ by around 52 kilometers per second. Other studies also show the atomic gas content of ESO 415-G26 is shown to recede at only 150 kilometers per second.
