= NGC 7385 =

Elliptical galaxy in the constellation Pegasus

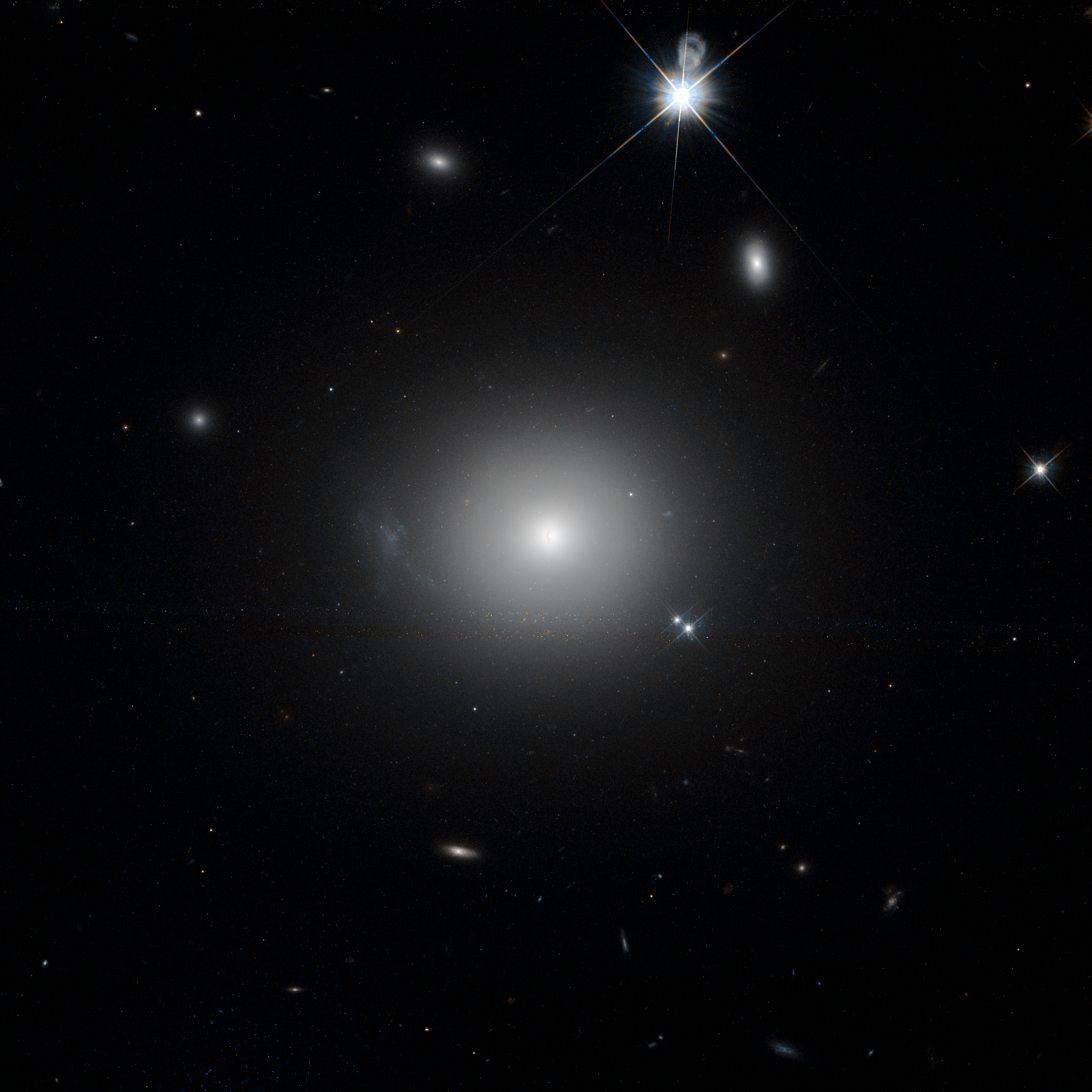
- HST image of NGC 7385

Observation data (J2000 epoch)
- Constellation: Pegasus
- Right ascension: 22^{h} 49^{m} 54.58^{s}
- Declination: +11° 36′ 30.84″
- Redshift: 0.026175
- Heliocentric radial velocity: 7,847 ± 10 km/s
- Distance: 359.8 ± 25.2 Mly (110.31 ± 7.73 Mpc)
- Group or cluster: Zwicky 2247.3+1107
- Absolute magnitude (V): 12.2

Characteristics
- Type: cD; E pec, LERG
- Size: ~164,000 ly (50.2 kpc) (estimated)

Other designations
- UGC 12207, MCG +02-58-017, PGC 69824, CGCG 430-015, 4C +11.71, GIN 663, Cul 2247+13, MRC 2247+113, PKS 2247+11, TXS 2247+113

NGC 7385 is an elliptical galaxy located in the constellation of Pegasus. The redshift of the galaxy is (z) 0.026 and it was first discovered in October 1784 by William Herschel, who described it as a small round faint object, It was also observed by John Herschel in 1827.

== Description ==
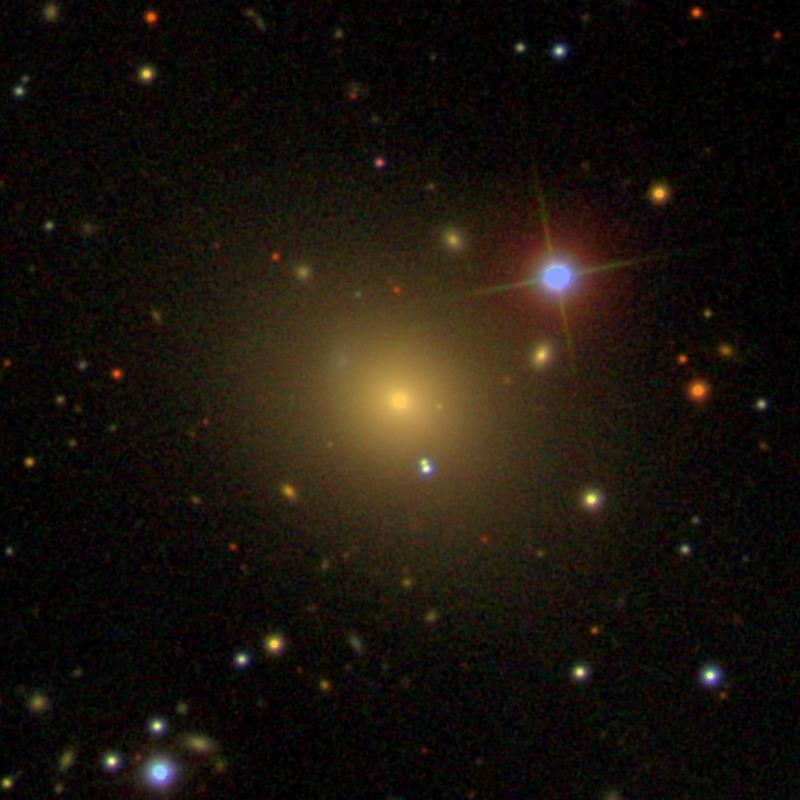
SDSS image of NGC 7385.

NGC 7385 is a member of the galaxy cluster Zwicky 2247.3+1107. It is a peculiar early-type elliptical galaxy with a Type E1 classification and has a measured velocity of 7,827 kilometers per seconds. The absolute blue magnitude has been estimated to be -21.83.

The nucleus has been found to be active and it has been classified as a Fanaroff-Riley Type I head-tail radio galaxy hosting a radio source called PKS 2247+11. There is a head component known to coincide with the optical position of the galaxy and a tail component extending by 12 arcseconds in a position angle of 209 degrees. Further imaging found there is a diffused component located on the nucleus in an opposite direction where the tail is located with a measured flux density of 243 ± 7 mJy. The dynamical age of the source has been estimated as 1,010 million years, with the total extent of the source being 442.3 kiloparsecs.

Radio imaging made with the Very Large Array discovered a radio jet on one side, which in turn extends towards the south-west direction from the unresolved radio core. An X-ray jet counterpart was also discovered, with further presence of faint X-ray emission covering an area of 5 arcseconds.

The head component when observed through high-resolution radio imaging at 5 GHz frequencies, is further split into two separate components. The first component is associated with the main galaxy's nucleus, whereas the other component is located on the opposite side of the tail position and is also associated with a blue knot feature. The optical spectrum of the knot displays emission lines of forbidden singly ionized oxygen, doubly ionized oxygen and H-beta elements. A H II region has been detected at the radio lobe edge, likely caused via interactions of both plasma and the surrounding interstellar medium.

== Supernova ==
One supernova has been observed in NGC 7385: SN 2005er (Type Ia-pec, mag. 18.7) was discovered by the Lick Observatory Supernova Search (LOSS) on 29 September 2005.
