= NGC 3656 =

Peculiar galaxy in the constellation Ursa Major

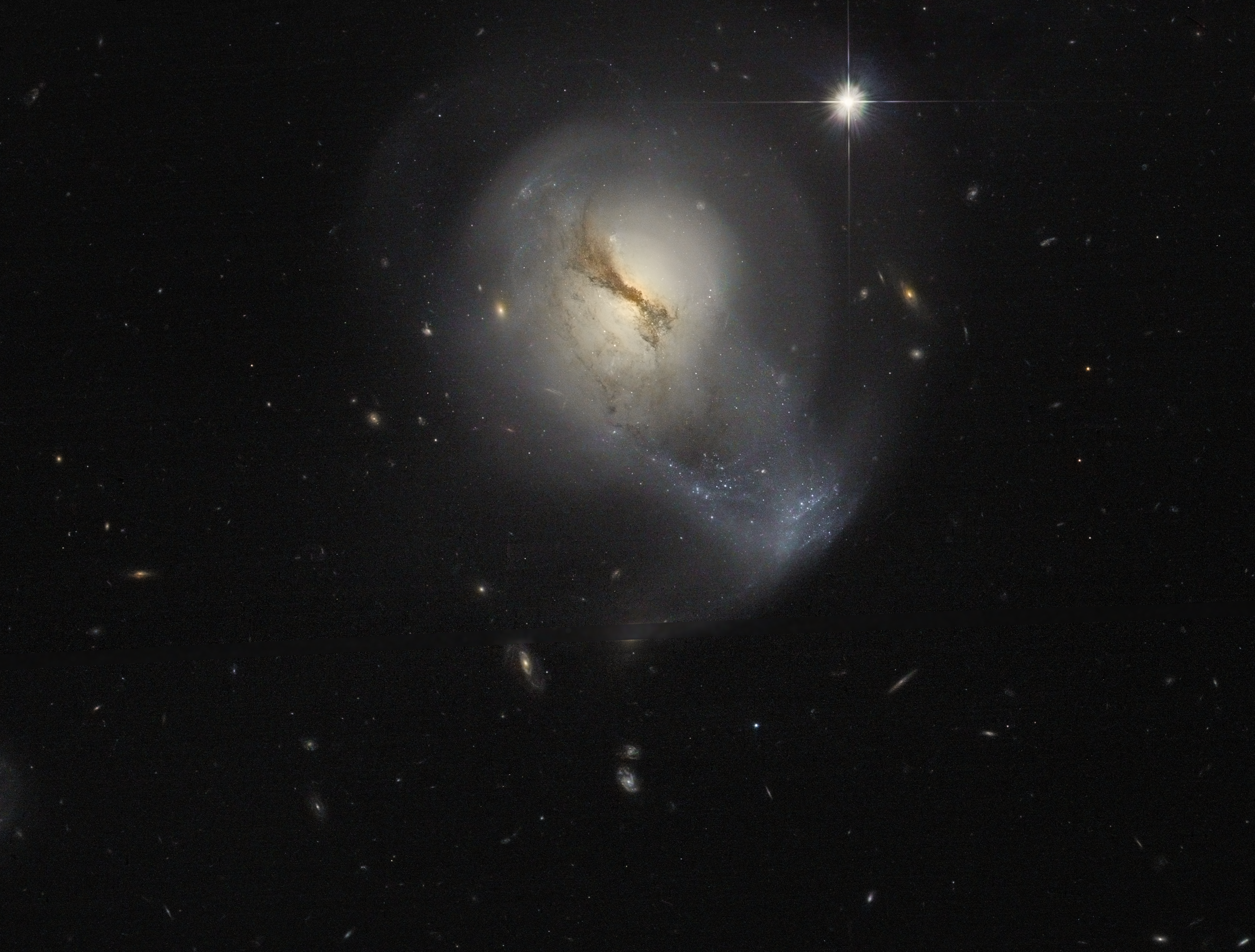
- NGC 3656 by the Hubble Space Telescope

Observation data (J2000 epoch)
- Constellation: Ursa Major
- Right ascension: 11^{h} 23^{m} 38.7^{s}
- Declination: +53° 50′ 32″
- Redshift: 0.009640 ± 0.000037
- Heliocentric radial velocity: 2,890 ± 11 km/s
- Distance: 139 Mly (42.6 Mpc)
- Apparent magnitude (V): 12.3

Characteristics
- Type: (R')I0: pec
- Apparent size (V): 1.6′ × 1.6′
- Notable features: Merger remnant

Other designations
- UGC 6403, Arp 155, VV 22a, CGCG 268-029, MCG +09-19-063, PGC 34989

NGC 3656 is a peculiar galaxy formed by the collision of two galaxies in the constellation of Ursa Major. It is located about 135 million light years away from Earth, which means, given its apparent dimensions, that NGC 3656 is approximately 70,000 light years across. It was discovered by William Herschel on April 14, 1789.

== Characteristics ==
NGC 3656 is a galaxy merger, created by the collision of two disk galaxies. The merger has created shells around the galaxy and two faint tidal tails. The first tail emanates from a position angle of 260° and after bends to the north-northwest. Its total extent is about 180 arcseconds, towards a dwarf galaxy, and maybe even more, towards a second dwarf galaxy. Its width is 15 arcseconds. The other tail lies at the north-northeast part of the galaxy and is not as well defined as the other. Other characteristics of the galaxy include the presence of a condensation at the south part of the galaxy connected with the rest of the galaxy with a ring-like feature and is associated with a bright shell.

A prominent feature of the galaxy is a dark lane running across the minor axis of the galaxy, similar to that observed in Centaurus A. At the centre of the galaxy a warped molecular gas disk extending for about 7 kiloparsecs has been observed in H I imaging, with an estimated mass of 2×10^{9} M_{☉}. The inner part of the disk features more intense star formation. The total star formation rate of the galaxy is estimated to be 1.1 M_{☉} per year.

The nucleus of NGC 3656 has been found to rotate around an axis that is almost perpendicular to the rotation axis of the rest of the galaxy, which is another indication of a galaxy merger.

== Supernovae ==
Two supernovae have been observed in NGC 3656:

- SN 1963K (type unknown, mag. 15) was discovered by Charles Bertaud on 15 June 1963.
- SN 1973C (type unknown, mag. 17) was discovered by Charles Kowal on 11 January 1973. It was co-discovered by Shakhbazyan.

== Nearby galaxies ==
NGC 3656 is the foremost member in a galaxy group known as the NGC 3656 group. Another member is UGC 6422. A bit further away lies the galaxy NGC 3549 with its group. Five dwarf galaxies with estimated masses between 2×10^{8} and 2×10^{9} M_{☉} have been detected in HI imaging around the galaxy and are probably in the process of being accreted by NGC 3656.

== See also ==
- List of NGC objects (3001–4000)
