= NGC 4506 =

Galaxy in the constellation Coma Berenices

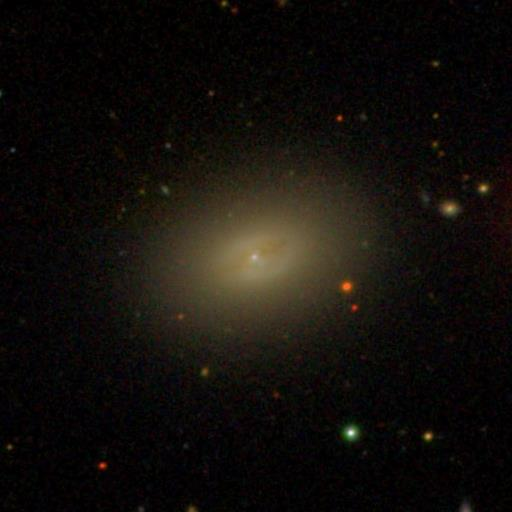
- SDSS image of NGC 4506

Observation data (J2000 epoch)
- Constellation: Coma Berenices
- Right ascension: 12^{h} 32^{m} 10.5^{s}
- Declination: 13° 25′ 11″
- Redshift: 0.002458/737 km/s
- Distance: 47.6 Mly
- Group or cluster: Virgo Cluster
- Apparent magnitude (V): 13.7

Characteristics
- Type: Sa pec
- Size: ~26,000 ly (estimated)
- Apparent size (V): 1.79 x 1.06

Other designations
- PGC 41546, UGC 7682, VCC 1419

NGC 4506 is a spiral galaxy located around 50 million light-years away in the constellation Coma Berenices. It is classified as peculiar due to the presence of dust that surrounds its nucleus. NGC 4506 was discovered by astronomer William Herschel on January 14, 1787. It is a member of the Virgo Cluster.

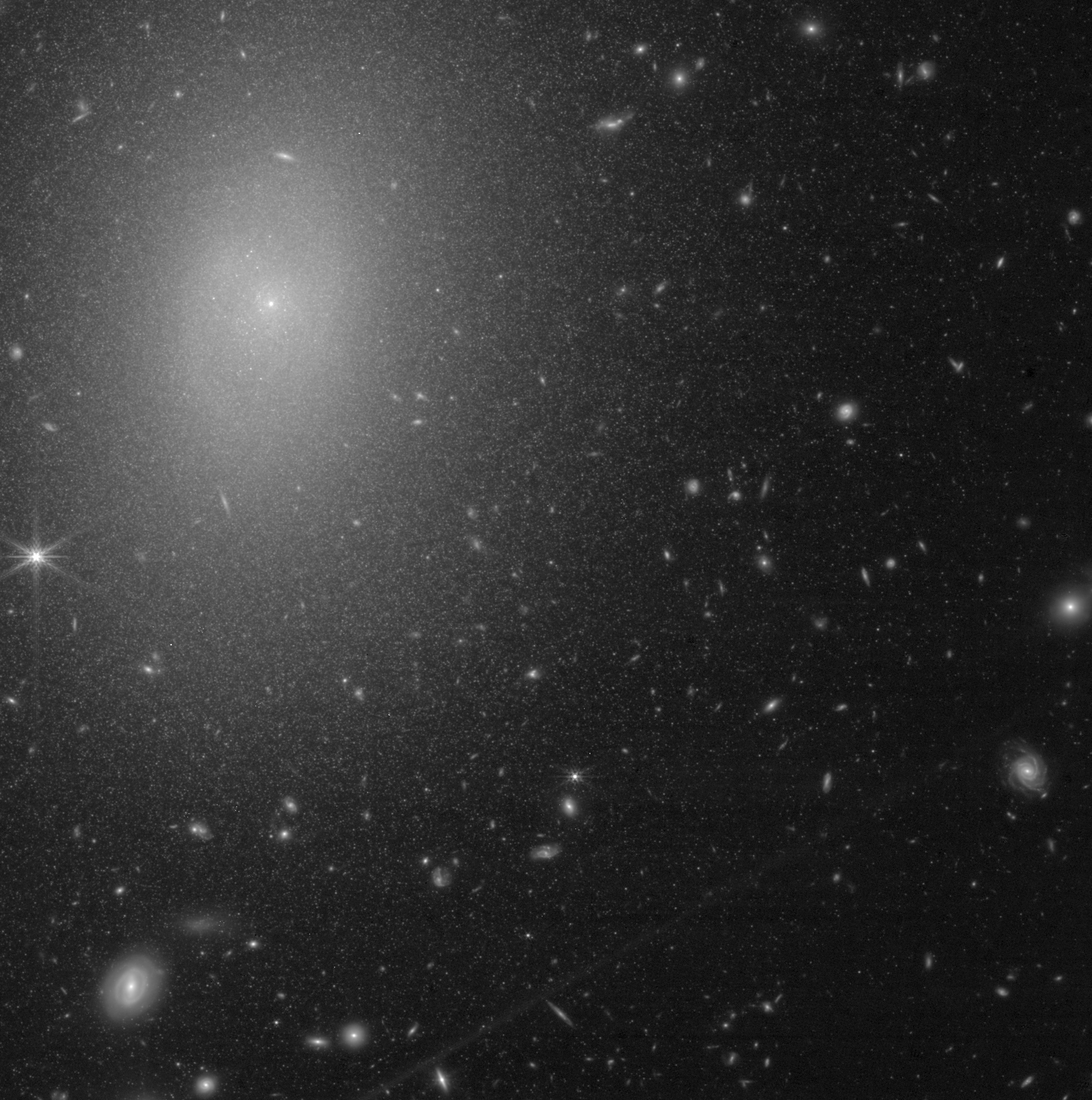
NGC 4506 with JWST NIRCam

== See also ==
- List of NGC objects (4001–5000)
