= ESO 235-58 =

Galaxy of uncertain type in the constellation Indus

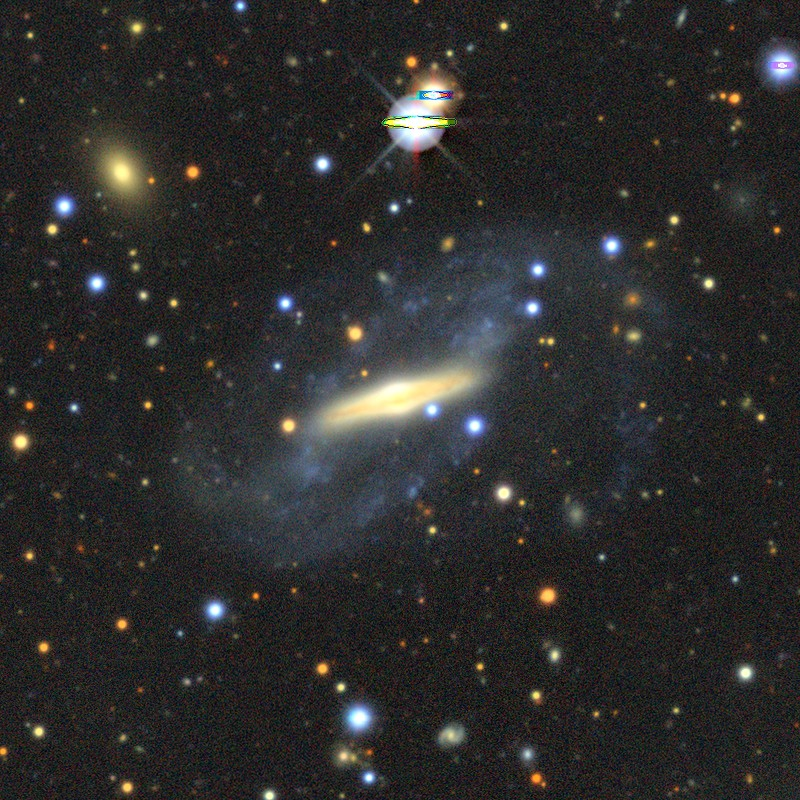
- ESO 235-58 by Legacy Survey DR10

Observation data (J2000 epoch)
- Constellation: Indus
- Right ascension: 21^{h} 06^{m} 28.411^{s}
- Declination: −48° 07′ 15.79″
- Redshift: 0.014512
- Heliocentric radial velocity: 4319.0 km/s

Characteristics
- Type: S

Other designations
- IRAS F21031-4819, 2MASX J21062841-4807157, PGC 66108

ESO 235-58 is a galaxy in the constellation of Indus.

Its exact nature is uncertain. At first glance, it appears like a barred spiral galaxy seen face on. However, further examination has shown that what appears to be the bar is actually the main structure of an edge-on spiral galaxy, and the galaxy has structure like that of polar-ring galaxies.

== Supernova ==
One supernova has been observed in ESO 235-58: SN 2003ho (Type II, mag. 18.6) was discovered by Berto Monard on 31 July 2003.
