= NGC 1343 =

Galaxy in the constellation Cassiopeia

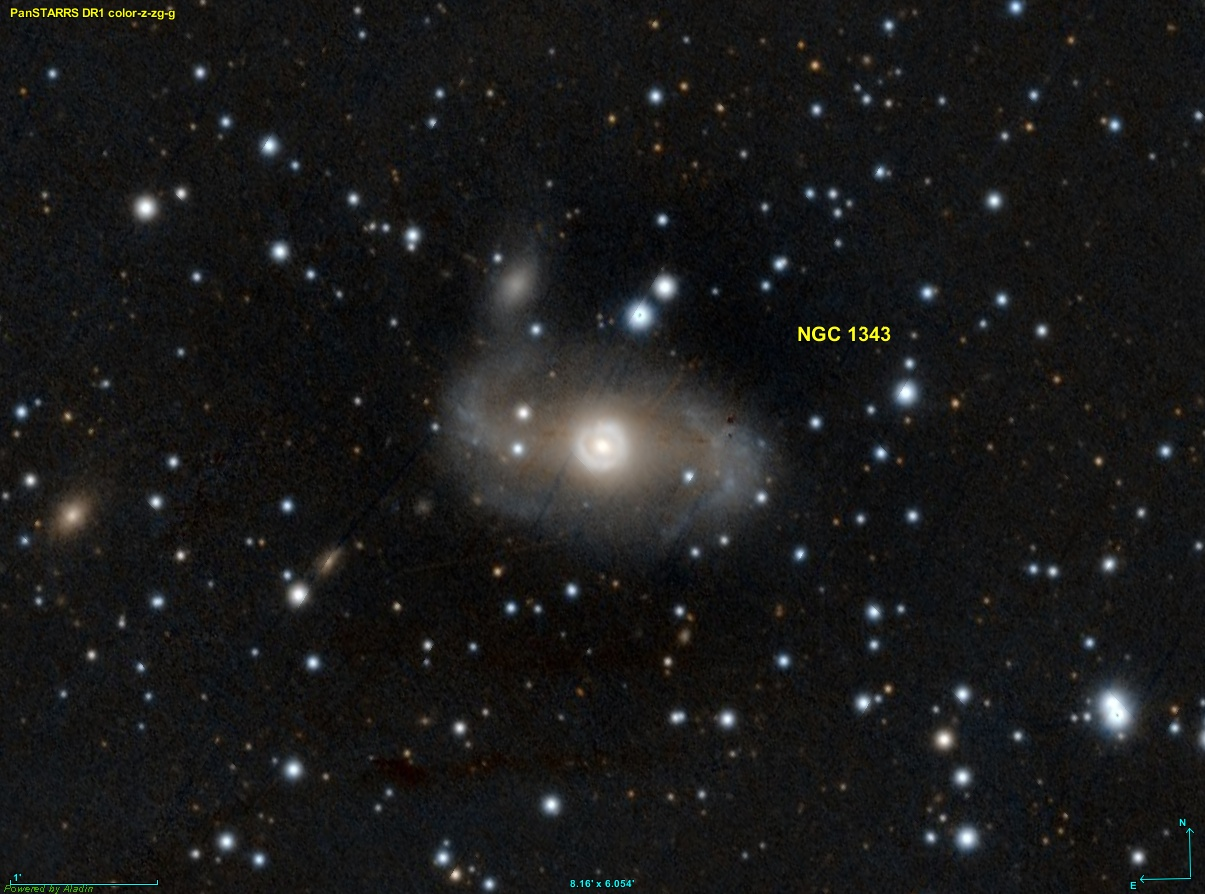
- Image NGC 1343 by Pan-STARRS

Observation data (J2000 epoch)
- Constellation: Cassiopeia
- Right ascension: 03^{h} 37^{m} 50^{s}
- Declination: 72° 34′ 16″
- Redshift: +0,007348 ± 0,000067
- Heliocentric radial velocity: 2214 km/s
- Distance: 4,2 ± 0,8 Mpc
- Apparent magnitude (V): 12.37
- Apparent magnitude (B): 13.67

Characteristics
- Type: SABb

Other designations
- UGC 2792, PGC 13384

NGC 1343 is a peculiar barred spiral galaxy located in the constellation Cassiopeia, with its eastern edge extending slightly into Camelopardalis. The galaxy is notable for its intense starburst activity within its bright blue inner ring, which surrounds a compact core. A faint bar connects to this ring, and subtle spiral arms with visible star clusters extend outward. NGC 1343 is also associated with a faint dwarf companion galaxy and has hosted a recorded supernova event. It was discovered by the German-British astronomer William Herschel on October 17, 1786. Due to its low surface brightness and position behind the Milky Way’s dust, NGC 1343 is relatively faint when observed from Earth.

== Structure and companion galaxy ==
The nearly circular inner ring is a distinctive feature, likely formed by resonance effects typical in barred galaxies. It shows a slight gap and is connected to the core by a faint bar.

A faint dwarf companion, designated HFLLZOA G134.74+13.65, is located northeast of the core. A possible faint star stream or bridge suggests gravitational interaction, though NGC 1343's disk shows minimal distortion.

== Supernova ==
One supernova has been observed in NGC 1343. SN 2008dv (Type Ic, mag. 18.2) was discovered by Japanese astronomer Kōichi Itagaki on 1 July 2008.
