= NGC 7280 =

Galaxy in the constellation Pegasus

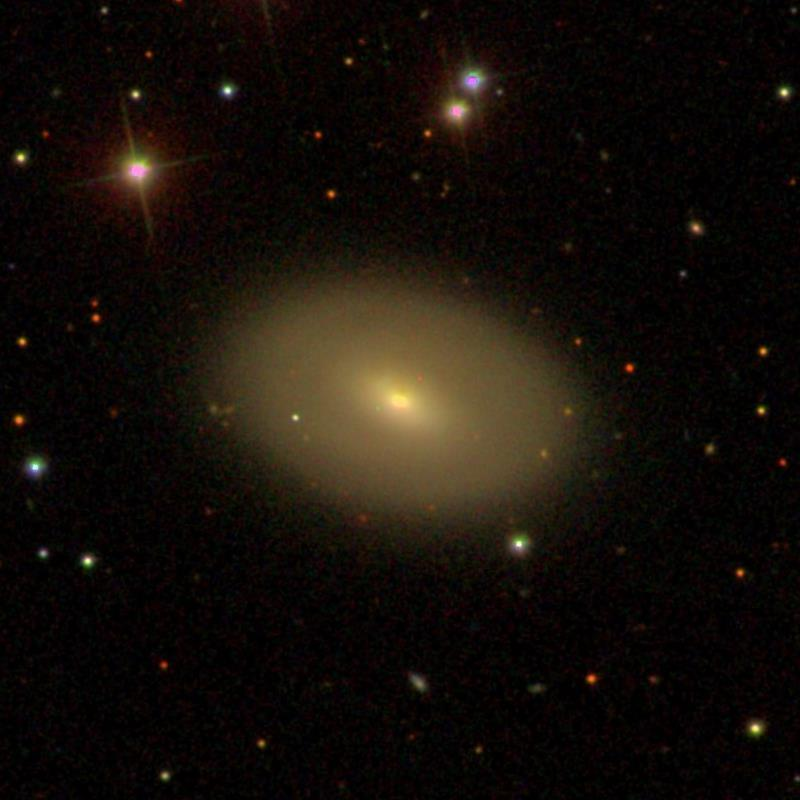
- NGC 7280 imaged by Sloan Digital Sky Survey

Observation data (J2000 epoch)
- Constellation: Pegasus
- Right ascension: 22^{h} 26^{m} 27.5764^{s}
- Declination: +16° 08′ 53.493″
- Redshift: 0.006164 ± 0.000013
- Heliocentric radial velocity: 1,848 ± 4 km/s
- Distance: 75.5 ± 7.1 Mly (23.15 ± 2.2 Mpc)
- Apparent magnitude (V): 12.1

Characteristics
- Type: SAB(r)0+
- Size: ~48,000 ly (14.7 kpc) (estimated)
- Apparent size (V): 2.2′ × 1.5′

Other designations
- UGC 12035, MCG +03-57-005, PGC 68870, CGCG 452-011

NGC 7280 is a lenticular galaxy in the constellation Pegasus. The galaxy lies about 75 million light years away from Earth, which means, given its apparent dimensions, that NGC 7280 is approximately 50,000 light years across. It was discovered by William Herschel on October 15, 1784.

NGC 7280 is a lenticular galaxy which is noted for having an inner gaseous polar ring. Dust lanes or rings are visible around the nucleus perpendicular to the major axis of the galaxy. The stellar population in the nucleus is younger than the surrounding area, with an estimated age of 1.5 ± 0.5 billion years, and has higher metallicity. A circumnuclear stellar disk about 1 arcsecond across has been detected by the Hubble Space Telescope. The galaxy also features an intermediate bar. Beyond the central region the gas and stars counter-rotate. The gas is also asymmetrically distributed. The gas was probably accreted recently because it exhibits shock-wave excitation. There is no active star formation detectable and there is no H-alpha emission from the nucleus. The galaxy is rich in hydrogen, with an estimated hydrogen mass of 10^{9} M_{☉}.

NGC 7280 is the foremost galaxy of the NGC 7280 Group, along with PGC 141021, UGCA 429, and UGC 12090. NGC 7280 interacts with UGCA 429, which lies 3.8 arcminutes away, as there is a hydrogen tail extending from the opposite side from NGC 7280.

== Gallery ==
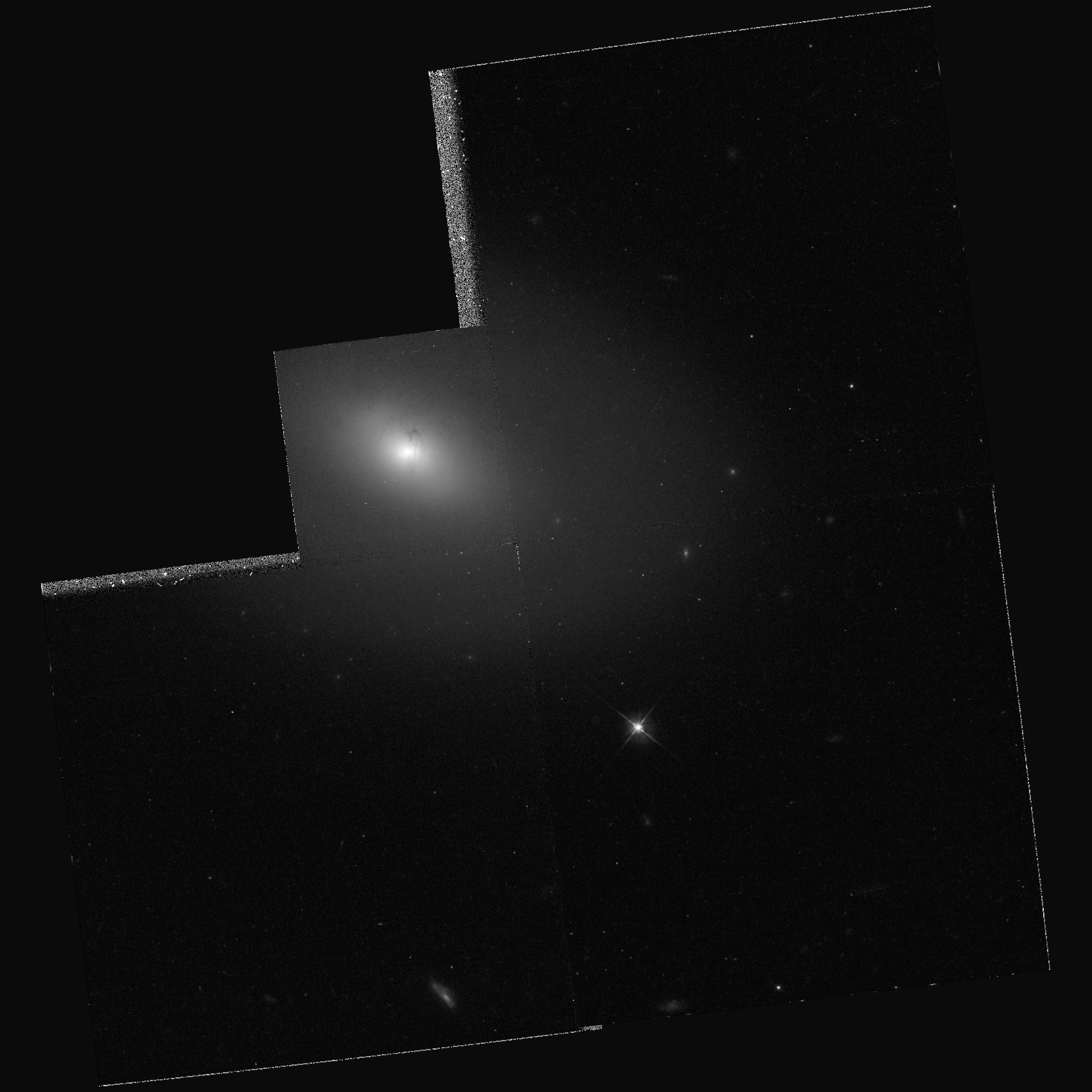
The central region of NGC 7280 by the Hubble Space Telescope
