= ESO 603-G21 =

Candidate polar-ring galaxy

Observation data (J2000 epoch)
- Constellation: Aquarius
- Right ascension: 22^{h} 51^{m} 22.061^{s}
- Declination: −20° 14′ 49.62″
- Heliocentric radial velocity: 3,193 km/s
- Distance: 143.9 Mly (44.12 Mpc)

Characteristics
- Apparent size (V): 0.533′ × 0.320′

Other designations
- IRAS 22486-2030, PGC 69867

ESO 603-G21 is a candidate polar-ring galaxy.
