= NGC 5363 =

Galaxy in the constellation Virgo

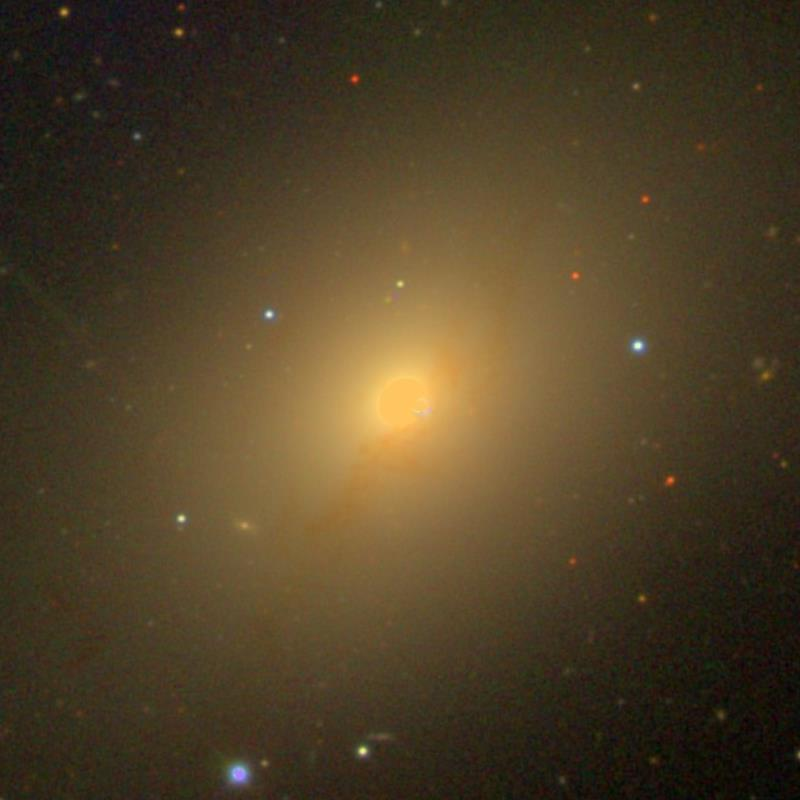
- NGC 5363 by SDSS

Observation data (J2000 epoch)
- Constellation: Virgo
- Right ascension: 13^{h} 56^{m} 07.2^{s}
- Declination: +05° 15′ 17″
- Redshift: 0.003799 ± 0.000017
- Heliocentric radial velocity: 1,139 ± 5 km/s
- Distance: 63.6 ± 13 Mly (19.5 ± 4.1 Mpc)
- Apparent magnitude (V): 10.5

Characteristics
- Type: I0?/S0
- Apparent size (V): 4.1′ × 2.6′
- Notable features: LINER, spiral dust disk

Other designations
- UGC 8847, CGCG 046-007, MCG +01-36-002, PGC 49547

NGC 5363 is a lenticular galaxy located in the constellation Virgo. It is located at a distance of circa 65 million light years from Earth, which, given its apparent dimensions, means that NGC 5363 is about 100,000 light years across. It was discovered by William Herschel on January 19, 1784. It is a member of the NGC 5364 Group of galaxies, itself one of the Virgo III Groups strung out to the east of the Virgo Supercluster of galaxies.

== Characteristics ==
NGC 5363 is characterised by the presence of a dust lane along its minor axis, visible also in mid-infrared maps, and a more extended one with an intermediate orientation. The total mass of cold dust in the galaxy is estimated to be 2×10^{6} M_{☉}, extending for 52 arcseconds in the far-infrared. The dust emission appears as a disk with spiral arms and a possible barlike structure, and extends at the outer parts of the galaxy as a fainter, armlike structure, along the major axis of the galaxy. The galaxy also features HII emission that forms a spiral disk.

The total dust mass is about a factor of 100 larger than the one predicted if it was created only by the mass lost by evolved stars. The galaxy also has shells, which are evidence of a recent merger, in which NGC 5363 accreted another galaxy, and thus it is strongly suggested that the interstellar dust is of external origin. It is highly likely that this merger event caused star formation activity in the galaxy, as is evident by the detection of ultraviolet radiation associated with young stars.

Based on its spectrum, the nucleus of NGC 5363 has been found to be active and has been categorised as a LINER. In the centre of NGC 5363 lies a supermassive black hole with an estimated mass of 375 million M_{☉}. NGC 5363 has been found to emit radio waves. The radio source consists of a compact core with a diameter of less than 2 arcseconds and probably an extended component, stretching for about 20 arcseconds.

== Nearby galaxies ==
NGC 5363 is the foremost galaxy in a galaxy group known as the NGC 5363 group. Other members of the group include NGC 5300, NGC 5348, NGC 5356, NGC 5360, and NGC 5364. NGC 5363 and NGC 5364 lie at a projected distance of 14.5 arcminutes, forming a non-interacting pair. The group is part of the Virgo III Groups, a very obvious chain of galaxy groups on the left side of the Virgo Cluster, stretching across 40 million light years of space.

== See also ==
- IC 1459, NGC 3108, NGC 5128, and NGC 5173 – other early-type galaxies with spiral features
