= NGC 4410 =

Interacting galaxies in the constellation Virgo

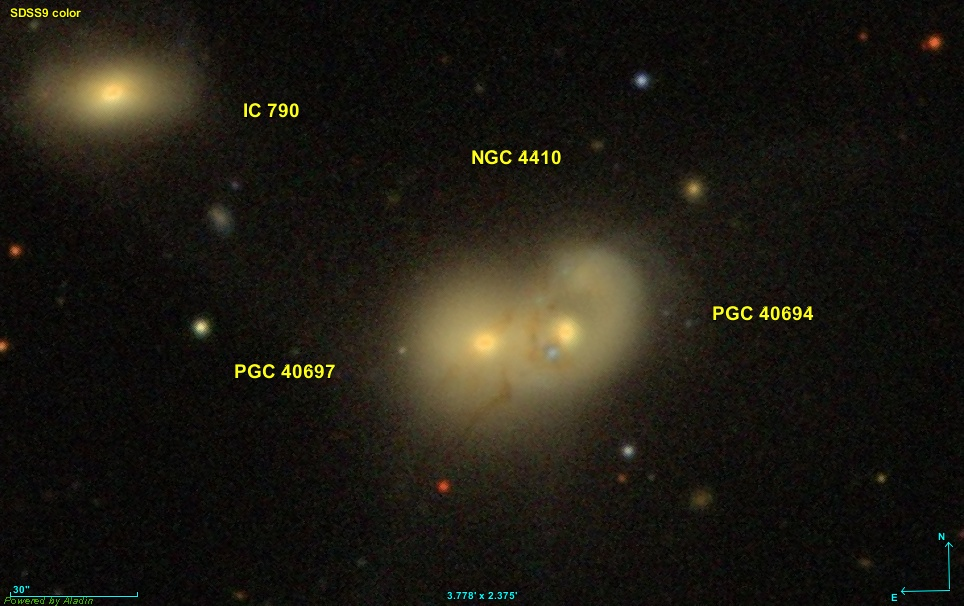
- The interacting pair of galaxies NGC 4410.

Observation data (J2000 epoch)
- Constellation: Virgo
- Right ascension: 12^{h} 26^{m} 28.89^{s}
- Declination: +09° 01′ 10.03″
- Redshift: 0.024197
- Heliocentric radial velocity: 7,254 km/s ± 109
- Distance: 365 Mly
- Apparent magnitude (V): 13.8 (NGC 4410A), 13.6 (NGC 4410B)

Characteristics
- Type: DBL SYS Sy3
- Size: ~142,000 ly (43.5 kpc) (estimated) (NGC 4410A), ~250,000 ly (76.7 kpc) (estimated) (NGC 4410B)

Other designations
- UGC 7535, MK 1325, MCG 2-32-47, PGC 40694 & PGC 40697

NGC 4410 is a pair of interacting galaxies located in the constellation of Virgo. The redshift of the pair is (z) 0.0241 and it was first discovered by the British astronomer John Herschel in January 1828. It is listed as a member of the Virgo Cluster, but in reality the galaxies lie at a much further distance. The galaxy pair are members of the NGC 4410 group, make up of at least a dozen galaxies, of which a few are found strongly interacting with each other.

== Description ==
NGC 4410 is made up of two close galaxies undergoing strong gravitational interactions. The first galaxy is NGC 4410A (PGC 40694), classified as a peculiar spiral galaxy of type Sab while NGC 4410B (PGC 40697) is a lenticular galaxy or an elliptical galaxy. The nucleus of NGC 4410A has been categorized as active and it has been described as both a radio galaxy of low luminosity and a LINER galaxy. NGC 4410B has an active galactic nucleus like NGC 4410A and is also a LINER galaxy. There is a ring-like structure in NGC 4410A based on optical imaging, with numerous H II regions present along the ring direction. X-ray emission has been detected. Bright knot features have also been detected, mainly in southeast and northeast directions from its bright central nucleus. Both nuclei of the galaxies are clearly seen, with the nucleus of NGC 4410A being depicted as elongated by 10 arcseconds from southwest to northeast. The star formation of NGC 4410A has been estimated to be 1–4 M_{☉} per year.

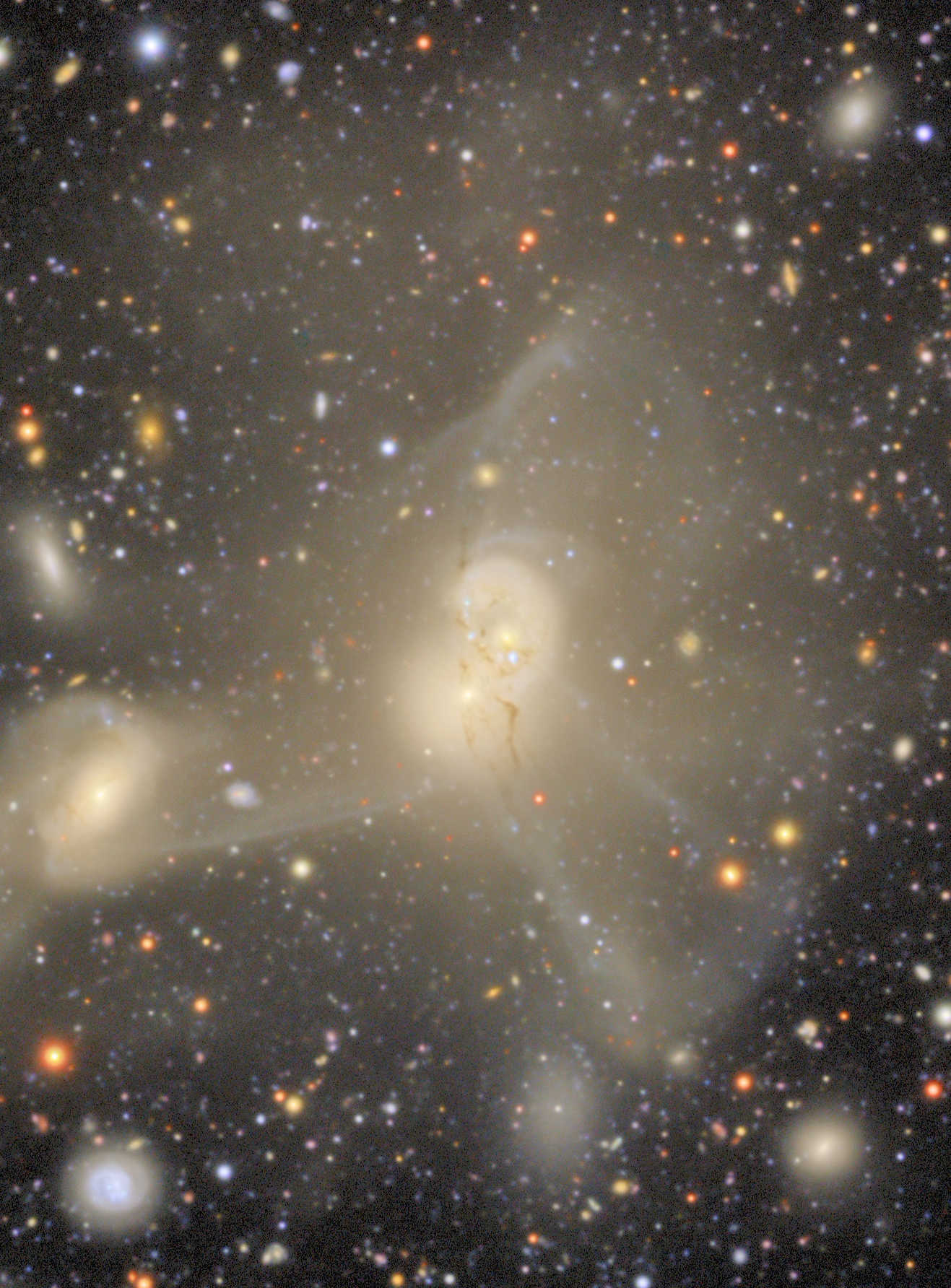
NGC 4410 imaged by the Vera C. Rubin Observatory

The radio structure of NGC 4410A is peculiar. When observed by the Very Large Array (VLA), it is revealed as extended by around four arcseconds, with the presence of optical radio emission in its large region. A single compact component was detected through observations at 6 and 2 centimeters. Other observations also found there are at least two radio lobes depicted as edge-brightened and it has an overall size of around 90 kiloparsecs when seen from east to west direction. The radio spectrum of the source in the central region and the knot feature is flat, but when going towards the south-east part, it becomes steep.

A study published in 2008 found there are complicated structures inside NGC 4410A, with a small prominent H II region that is located southeast from the nucleus and also a tidal arm feature both west and northwest from it. There is also a dust lane present. A spiral arm structure is seen within the radius of the central regions of NGC 4410A by around 4 to 5 arcseconds. Axisymetrical structures are also detected in NGC 4410B from southeast to northwest, which in turn, run through the center. This is suggested to be an edge-on galaxy disc. NGC 4410B also has boxy isothopes.

It is confirmed NGC 4410A and NGC 4410B are merging with each other, that the merger also includes two other galaxies; IC 790 or NGC 4410C (a lenticular galaxy) and NGC 4410D, given there are tidal features and bridges of emission connecting each other. A H I tail feature has been found in a southeast direction from NGC 4410A and NGC 4410B, and is extended by 50 kiloparsecs. The total combined H_{2} mass for both galaxies has been estimated as 3.9 × 10^{9} M_{☉}.

== Supernova ==
One supernova has been observed in NGC 4410: SN 1965A (type unknown, mag. 16) was discovered by Enrique Chavira on 1 January 1965.
