= NGC 5591 =

Interacting peculiar spiral galaxy in the constellation Boötes

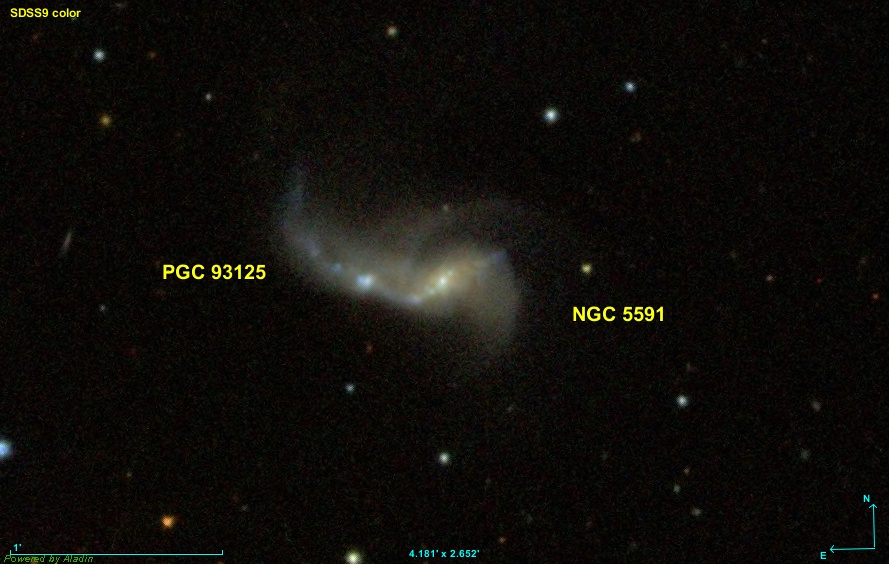
- NGC 5591 is the galaxy in the center of the image. Image by SDSS

Observation data (J2000 epoch)
- Constellation: Boötes
- Right ascension: 14h 22m 32s
- Declination: +13° 41' 01"
- Redshift: 0.0256
- Heliocentric radial velocity: 7,541 ± 27 (NGC 5591 NED 1) 7,642 ± 27 (NGC 5591 NED 2)
- Distance: 540 Mly
- Apparent magnitude (V): 14.5

Characteristics
- Type: Interacting galaxy
- Size: ~150,000 ly
- Apparent size (V): 1.3′ × 0.6′

Other designations
- UGC 9207, MCG +02-37-005, PGC 51368

NGC 5591 is a peculiar spiral galaxy, or more precisely an interacting galaxy pair, located in the constellation of Boötes, located around 540 million light years away. It was discovered by the American astronomer Lewis Swift in 1886. Its velocity relative to the cosmic microwave background is 7902±18 km/s, corresponding to a Hubble distance of 116.6±8.2 Mpc.

== Observations ==
In fact, this system is a pair of galaxies in gravitational interaction consisting of NGC 5591 and PGC 93125. However, Swift’s description (very faint, small, and round) suggests that he observed only NGC 5591. At a distance of 116.27±8.14 Mpc, PGC 93125 is therefore considered a companion galaxy rather than an object in the NGC catalogue.

NGC 5591 exhibits a broad H I line. According to the SIMBAD database, NGC 5591 is classified as a radio galaxy. NGC 5591 is a galaxy whose nucleus shines in the ultraviolet region of the spectrum. It is listed in the Markarian Catalogue under the designation Mrk 809 (MK 809).

== See also ==
- List of NGC objects (5001-6000)
