= NGC 5364 =

Spiral galaxy in the constellation Virgo

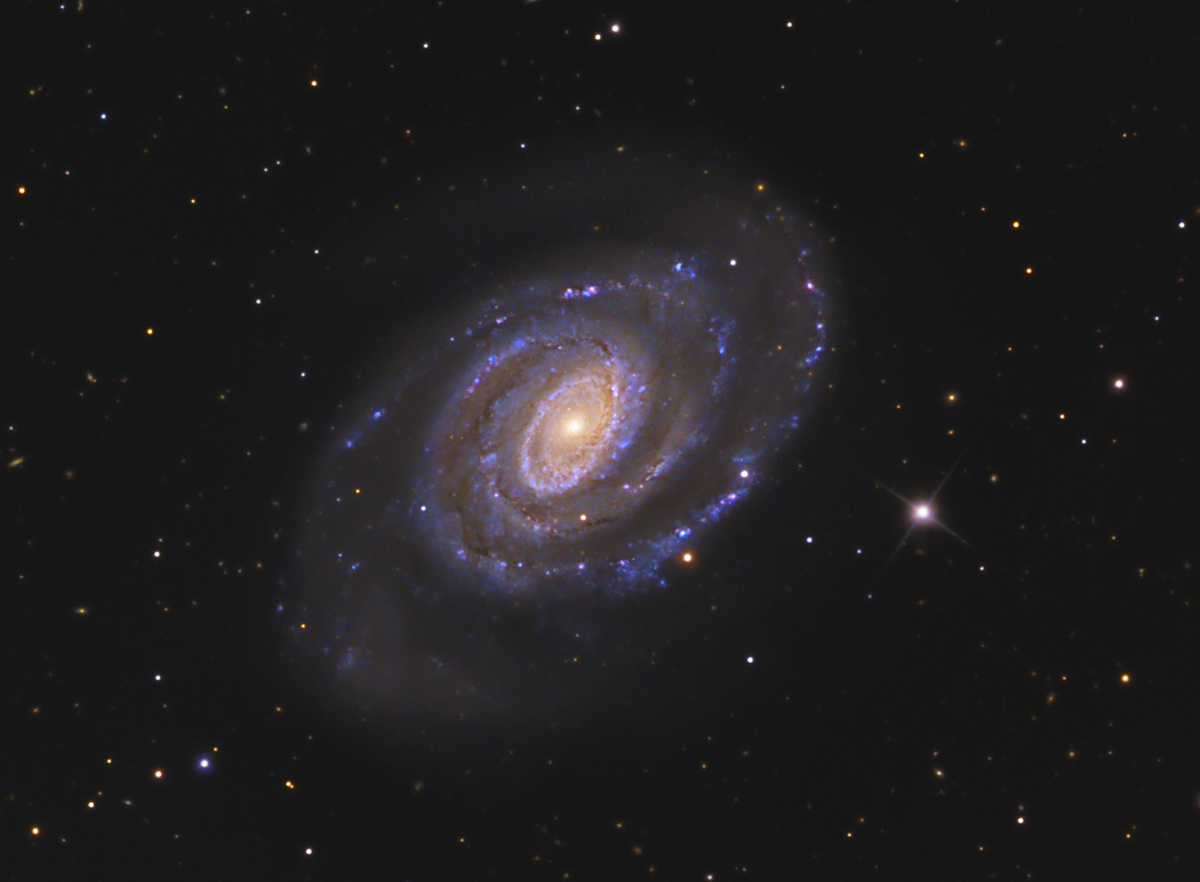
- NGC 5364 imaged with the 24-inch telescope at Mount Lemmon Observatory

Observation data (J2000 epoch)
- Constellation: Virgo
- Right ascension: 13^{h} 56^{m} 12.004^{s}
- Declination: +05° 00′ 52.06″
- Redshift: 0.004228
- Heliocentric radial velocity: 1267 ± 2 km/s
- Distance: 54.5 ± 3.9 Mly (16.7 ± 1.2 Mpc)
- Group or cluster: NGC 5364 Group (LGG 362)
- Apparent magnitude (V): 11.2

Characteristics
- Type: SA(rs)bc pec
- Size: ~110,700 ly (33.94 kpc) (estimated)
- Apparent size (V): 6.1′ × 6.8′

Other designations
- HOLM 557A, IRAS 13536+0515, NGC 5317, UGC 8853, MCG +01-36-003, PGC 49555, CGCG 046-009

NGC 5364 is a grand design spiral galaxy located 54.5 million light years away in the constellation Virgo. It is inclined to the line of sight from the Earth at an angle of 47° along a position angle of 25°. It is a member of the NGC 5364 Group of galaxies (also known as LGG 362), itself one of the Virgo III Groups strung out to the east of the Virgo Supercluster of galaxies. The galaxies NGC 5364 and NGC 5360 are also listed together as Holm 557 in Erik Holmberg's A Study of Double and Multiple Galaxies Together with Inquiries into some General Metagalactic Problems, published in 1937.

== Structure ==
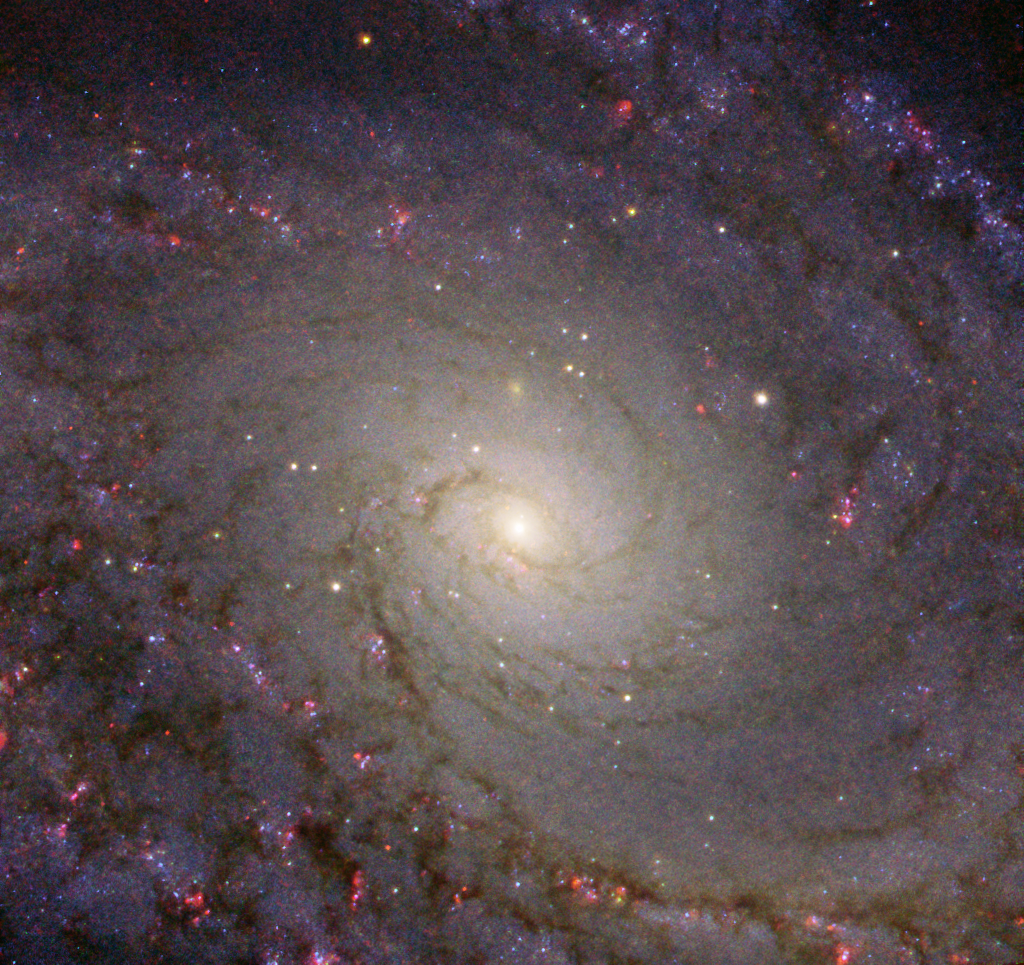
Sometimes called a "grand design" spiral galaxy, it is characterised by their prominent, well-defined arms, which circle outwards from a clear core (HST-image)

The morphological classification of NGC 5364 in the De Vaucouleurs system is SA(rs)bc pec, which indicates it has an incomplete ring structure (rs) in the inner part of the galaxy with moderate to loosely wound arms (bc) and has a peculiar aspect (pec). In particular, the appearance of the spiral arms is amorphous and asymmetrical compared to other galaxies with a similar classification. A companion galaxy, NGC 5363, is located to the north of NGC 5364 and their gravitational interaction may be influencing the peculiar morphology of the latter.

The mid-infrared emission in the nucleus appears weak compared to the spiral arms, suggesting a low rate of star formation in the core region. The inner ring of this galaxy spans a diameter of 22 kly (6.7 kpc) and is located slightly off center with the northern side showing a stronger emission in the hydrogen alpha band compared to the southern half. Multiple H II regions lie along the spiral arms, tracing out their extent. Each of the two main arms wrap all the way around the galaxy, although they display patchiness along much of their length.

== NGC designation ==
This object was discovered by William Herschel on February 2, 1786, and later listed as NGC 5364. It was subsequently rediscovered by John Herschel on April 7, 1828, and later listed as NGC 5317.

== Image gallery ==
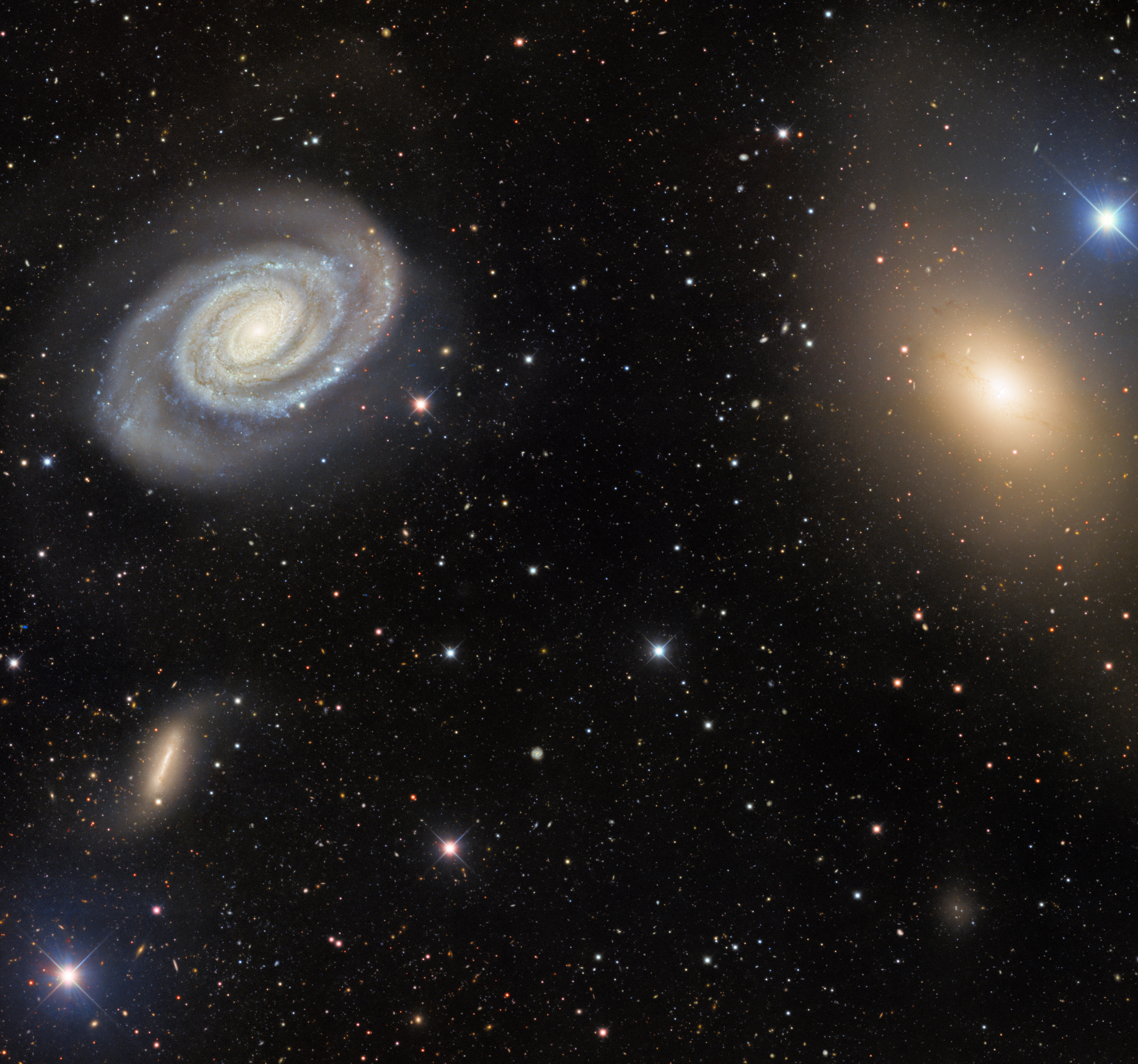
NGC 5364 (left) and NGC 5363 (right), imaged by the Cerro Tololo Inter-American Observatory
