= A0136-0801 =

Lenticular galaxy in the constellation Cetus

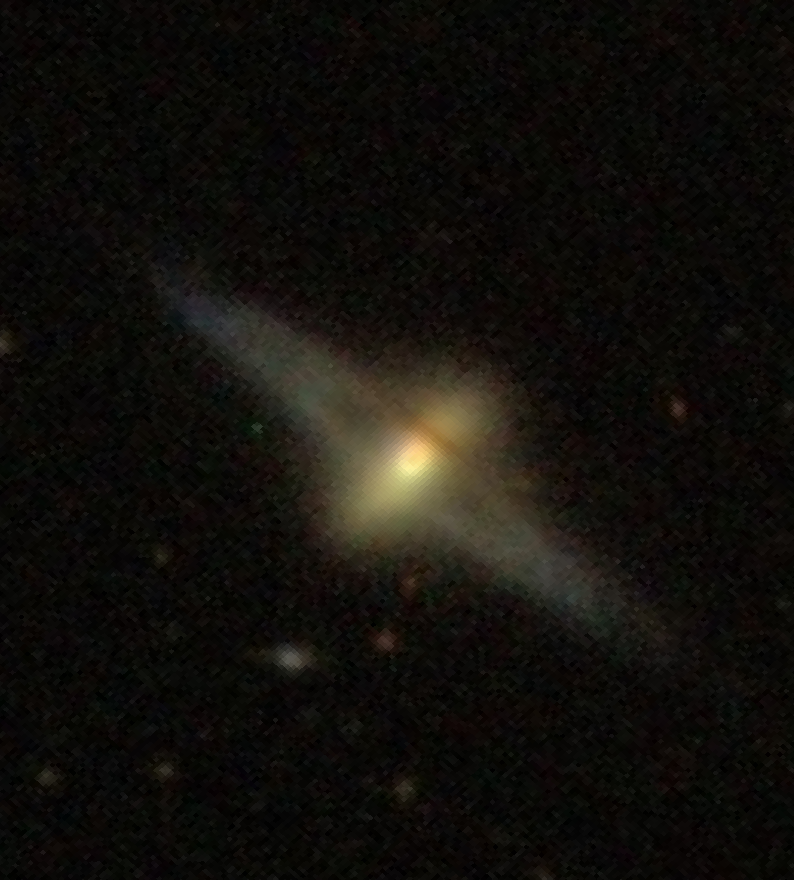
- The polar ring galaxy A0136-0801

Observation data (J2000 epoch)
- Constellation: Cetus
- Right ascension: 01^{h} 38^{m} 55.23^{s}
- Declination: −07° 45′ 55.64″
- Redshift: 0.018439
- Heliocentric radial velocity: 5,528 km/s ± 14
- Distance: 249 Mly
- Apparent magnitude (B): 15.62

Characteristics
- Type: Polar ring
- Size: ~59,800 ly (18.32 kpc) (estimated)

Other designations
- PRC A-01, 6dF J0138552-074556, PGC 6101, NSA 130130, 2MASX J01385522-0745553, NPM1G -08.0057

A0136-0801 known as Anon 0136-0801 is a lenticular galaxy located in the constellation of Cetus. The redshift of the galaxy is (z) 0.018 and it was first discovered by astronomers in 1983 who classified it as a spindle galaxy. It is also categorized as a polar ring galaxy.

== Description ==
A0136-0801 is classified as a spindle-shaped lenticular galaxy viewed nearly edge-on, with a dominant component being the central spheroid. It is known to display a polar ring structure that extends three times the radius of the central host galaxy. The light of the surface brightness profile is found to be associated with the host galaxy by 10 arcseconds from the galactic center, while a ring component extends outwards for about 40 arcseconds. The polar ring is less luminous when compared to the host. There is also a structure appearing as disk-like along the host galaxy's major axis. Optical R-band imaging has found two arms present in the polar ring structure. This ring appears to be both stable and old.

Studies also found A0136-0801 has H I regions. Most of the H I emission is within the ring region and the outer contours that appear to warp away from the pole positions. The estimated mass of the H I content is estimated to be 1.6 × 10^{9} M_{☉}. The halo of the galaxy is estimated to have a flat rotation curve above the galactic disk plane, suggesting dark mass is being flattened. Neutral hydrogen has also been detected, with a mass of around 8.3 × 10^{8} M_{☉}.

The galaxy also appears to be isolated, since no companions have been detected nearby and the closest galaxy PGC 6186 is located 18 arcmin away from it, with their redshifts differing by around 31 kilometers per seconds.
