= Arp 87 =

Pair of interacting galaxies in the constellation Leo

NGC 3808A
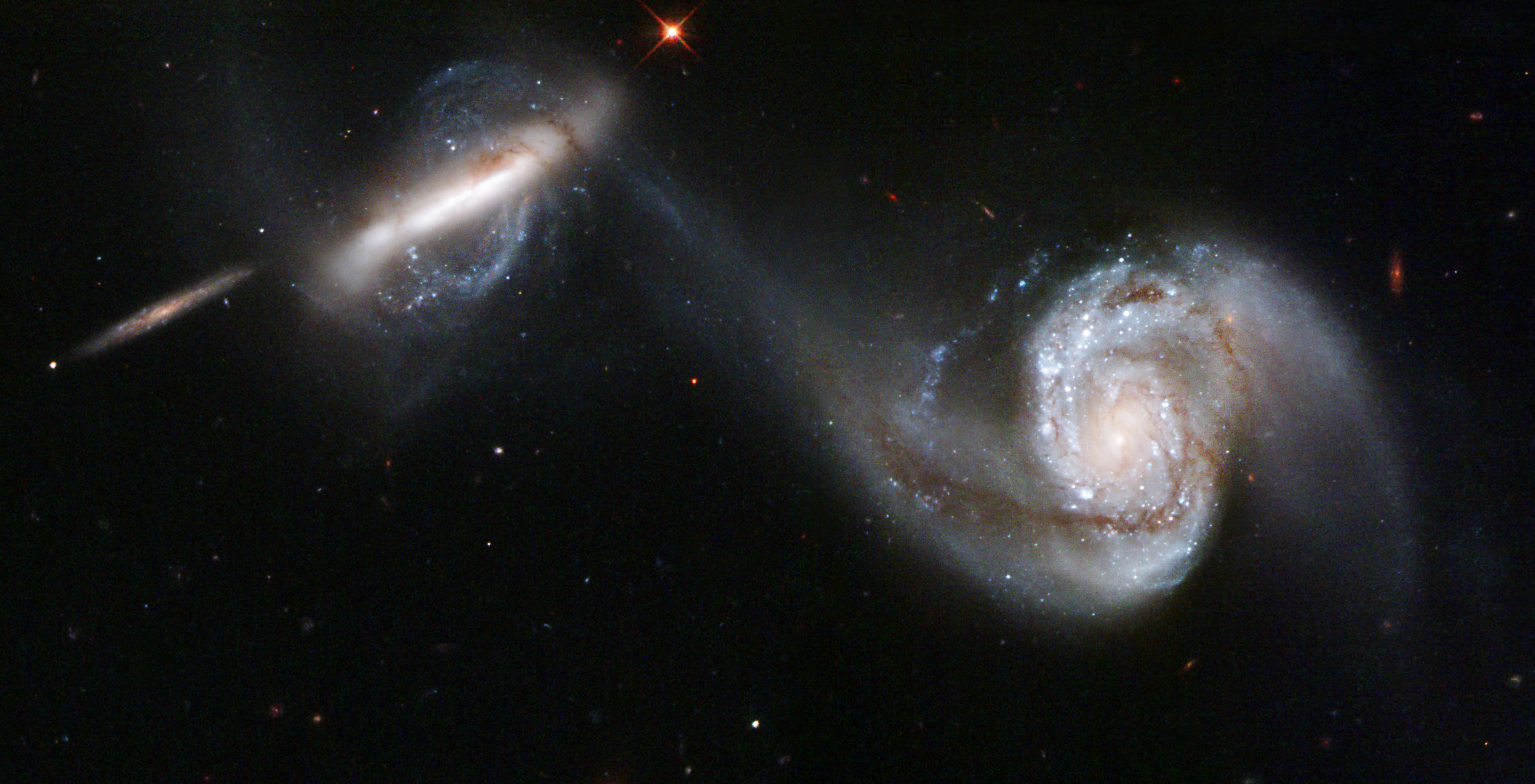
- NGC 3808A (right) and 3808B (left) imaged by the Hubble Space Telescope

Observation data (J2000 epoch)
- Constellation: Leo
- Right ascension: 11^{h} 40^{m} 44.4^{s}
- Declination: +22° 26′ 16″
- Redshift: 0.023726
- Heliocentric radial velocity: 7113 km/s
- Apparent magnitude (V): 14.1

Characteristics
- Type: NGC 3808A: SAB(rs)c? pec I0? pec
- Apparent size (V): 2.5′ × 0.8′

Other designations
- NGC 3808, UGC 6643; NGC 3808A: MCG +04-28-021, PGC 36227; NGC 3808B: MCG +04-28-020, PGC 36228

Arp 87 (also known as NGC 3808) is a pair of interacting galaxies, NGC 3808A and NGC 3808B in the constellation Leo. NGC 3808A, the brighter, is a peculiar spiral galaxy, while NGC 3808B is an irregular galaxy.

The two galaxies were discovered on 10 April 1785 by William Herschel. The two are located about 330 million light-years (100 megaparsecs) away from the Earth. Arp 87 was observed by the Hubble Space Telescope in 2007, which revealed massive clouds of gas and dust flowing from one galaxy to another. Additionally, both galaxies appear to have been distorted.

Arp 87 is an isolated member of the Coma Supercluster.

One supernova has been observed in NGC 3808A: SN 2013db (Type II-P, mag. 17.1) was discovered by Robert Gagliano, Jack Newton, and Tim Puckett on 29 May 2013.

== See also ==
- Atlas of Peculiar Galaxies by Halton Arp
- List of NGC objects (3001–4000)
