= UGC 9796 =

Lenticular and polar ring galaxy in the constellation Bootes

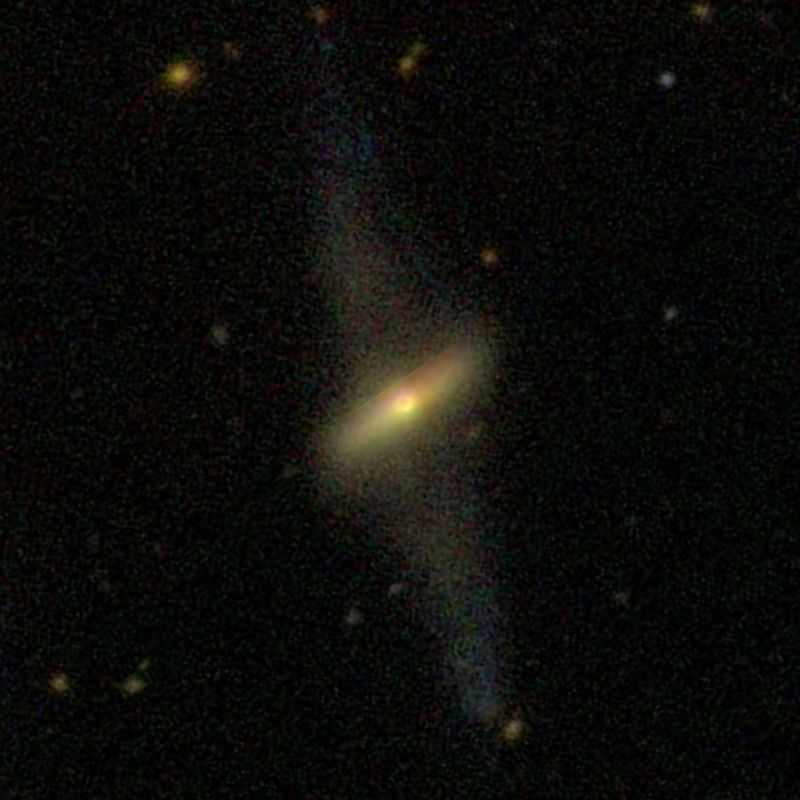
- SDSS image of UGC 9796

Observation data (J2000 epoch)
- Constellation: Boötes
- Right ascension: 15^{h} 15^{m} 56.30625^{s}
- Declination: +43° 10′ 00.4797″
- Redshift: 0.017980
- Heliocentric radial velocity: 5342 km/s
- Distance: 264.8 ± 18.6 Mly (81.20 ± 5.69 Mpc)

Characteristics
- Type: S0?

Other designations
- PGC 54461, UGC 9796, MCG +07-31-48, PRC A-06, FGC 224A, ASK 403591.0, II Zw 73

UGC 9796 is a lenticular and polar-ring galaxy in the constellation Boötes, and about 250 million light years distant from Earth. It is an object of great scientific interest as there have been very few polar ring galaxies discovered. UGC 9796 is a very gas-rich environment hosting as much 5×10^{9} solar masses of neutral hydrogen. DSS and SDSS images show that it is very similar to polar ring galaxy NGC 660, the best-known of all the polar ring galaxies.

This object is also known as PGC 54461, MCG+07-31-48, and PRC A-06
