= NGC 5173 =

Galaxy in the constellation Canes Venatici

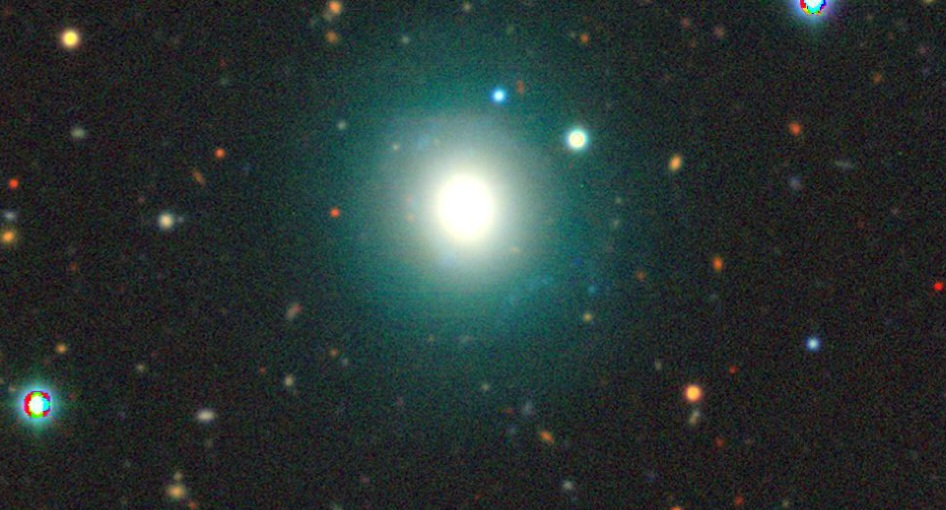
- NGC 5173 imaged by the DESI Legacy Surveys

Observation data (J2000 epoch)
- Constellation: Canes Venatici
- Right ascension: 13^{h} 28^{m} 25.280^{s}
- Declination: +46° 35′ 29.89″
- Heliocentric radial velocity: 2,419 km/s
- Distance: 125 ± 23 Mly (38.3 ± 7.0 Mpc)
- Apparent magnitude (V): 12.2
- Apparent magnitude (B): 13.2
- Surface brightness: 12.2

Characteristics
- Type: SA
- Apparent size (V): 1.191′ × 1.066′

Other designations
- NGC 5173, UGC 8468, LEDA 47257, MCG +08-25-005, PGC 47257

NGC 5173 is a peculiar elliptical galaxy in the northern constellation of Canes Venatici. It was discovered May 12, 1787 by German-British astronomer William Herschel. This galaxy has an apparent visual magnitude of 12.2, and spans an angular size of 1.2′ × 1.1′. It is the second brightest member of a small group of galaxies, with the brightest being NGC 5198; it lies at the eastern edge of its group. NGC 5171 is separated from the nearby Sb galaxy NGC 5169 by just 5.5′, and they have a velocity difference of 17 km/s.

Originally, this was classified by de Vaucouleurs as an elliptical galaxy, having a morphological classification of E0: which indicates a spherically-symmetric shape. In 1984, neutral hydrogen gas was discovered in NGC 5171, with a mass estimated at ~10^{9} M_{☉} being about double that of gas-rich ellipticals.

Observations reported in 1991 showed the presence of a star-forming spiral structure located off-center from the galaxy isophotes. This may be the remnant of an accreted galaxy similar to the Large Magellanic Cloud, with at least 10–20% of the original galaxy's mass. The disk has a radial extent of about 3.5 to 9.5 kpc. Massive clusters have formed in this disk over the last 400 Myr. Observations with the Hubble Space Telescope show filamentary structures at the center of the galaxy.
