= NGC 2685 =

Lenticular and polar-ring galaxy in the constellation Ursa Major

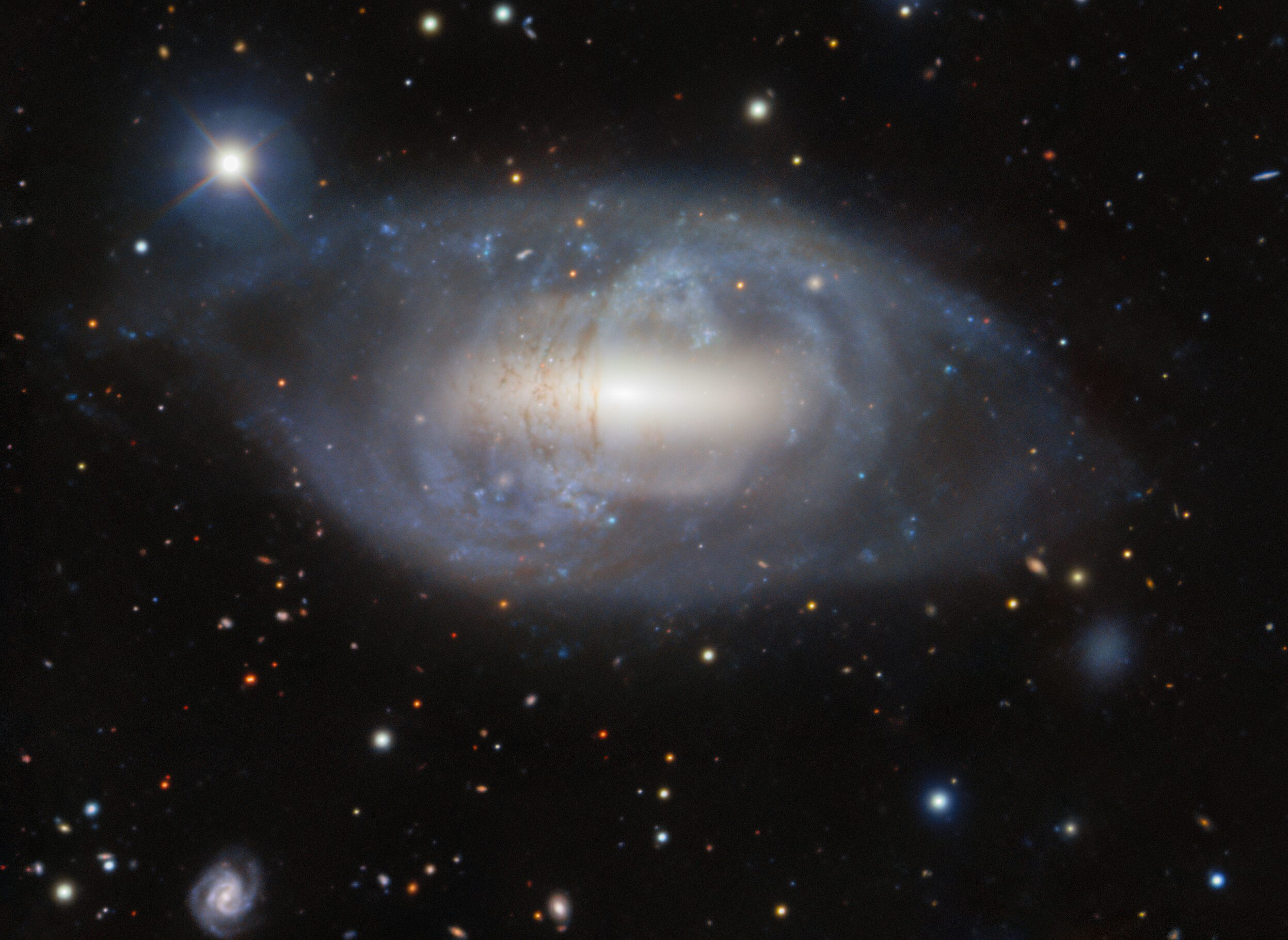
- NGC 2685 imaged by the Gemini North Telescope

Observation data (J2000 epoch)
- Constellation: Ursa Major
- Right ascension: 08^{h} 55^{m} 34.7287^{s}
- Declination: +58° 44′ 03.908″
- Redshift: 0.002945
- Distance: 48.2 ± 3.4 Mly (14.79 ± 1.05 Mpc)
- Apparent magnitude (V): 11.3

Characteristics
- Type: (R)SB0^+ pec
- Size: ~61,900 ly (18.98 kpc) (estimated)
- Apparent size (V): 4.6′ × 2.5′

Other designations
- Pancake Galaxy, Helix Galaxy, IRAS F08516+5855, 2MASX J08553474+5844038, Arp 336, UGC 4666, MCG +10-13-039, PGC 25065, CGCG 288-012

NGC 2685 (also known as the Helix Galaxy) is a lenticular and polar ring Seyfert Type 2 galaxy in the constellation Ursa Major. Its velocity with respect to the cosmic microwave background is 1003 ± 9 km/s, which corresponds to a Hubble distance of 48.2 ± 3.4 Mly (14.79 ± 1.05 Mpc). Additionally, eight non-redshift measurements give a distance of 42.56 ± 3.01 Mly (13.050 ± 0.924 Mpc). It was discovered by German astronomer Wilhelm Tempel on 18 August 1882.

NGC 2685 is an object of great scientific interest, because polar-ring galaxies are very rare galaxies. They are thought to form when two galaxies gravitationally interact with each other. "The bizarre configuration could be caused by the chance capture of material from another galaxy by a disk galaxy, with the captured debris strung out in a rotating ring. Still, observed properties of NGC 2685 suggest that the rotating ring structure is remarkably old and stable."

Allan Sandage referred to NGC 2685 as "perhaps the most peculiar galaxy in the Shapley-Ames Catalog".

== Gallery ==
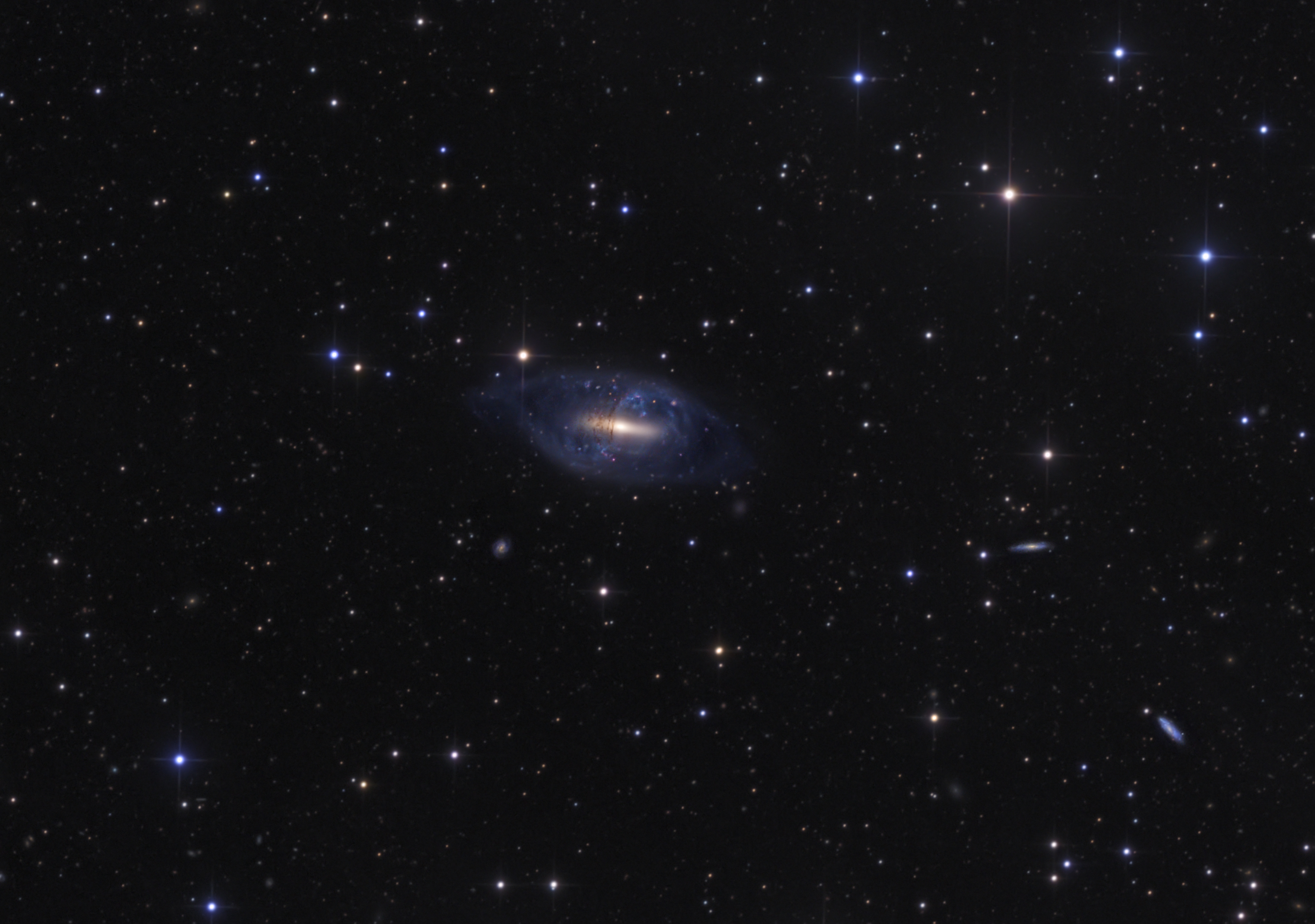
Image by Ken Crawford

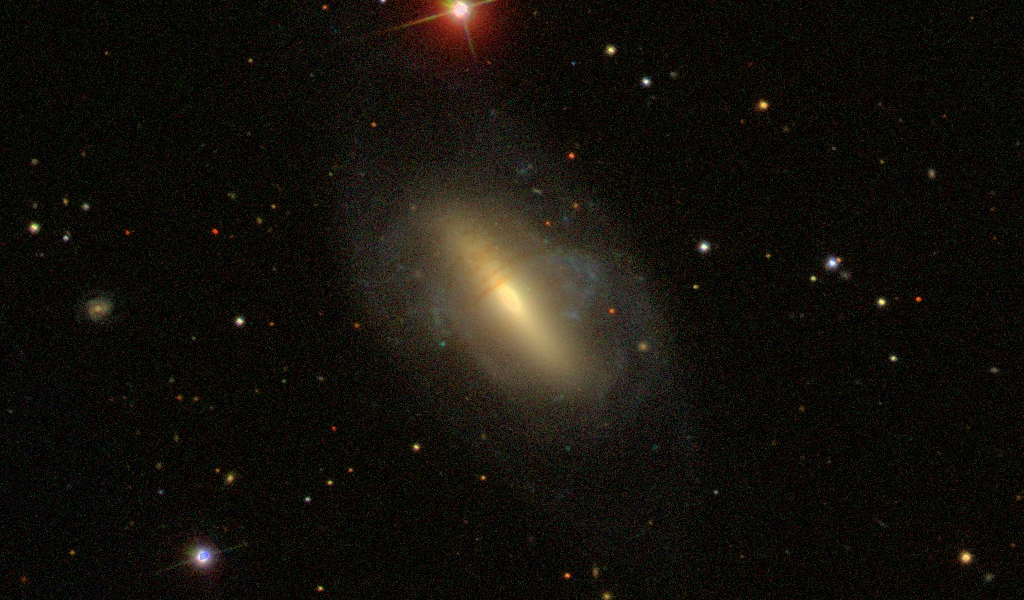
Sloan Digital Sky Survey (SDSS) image

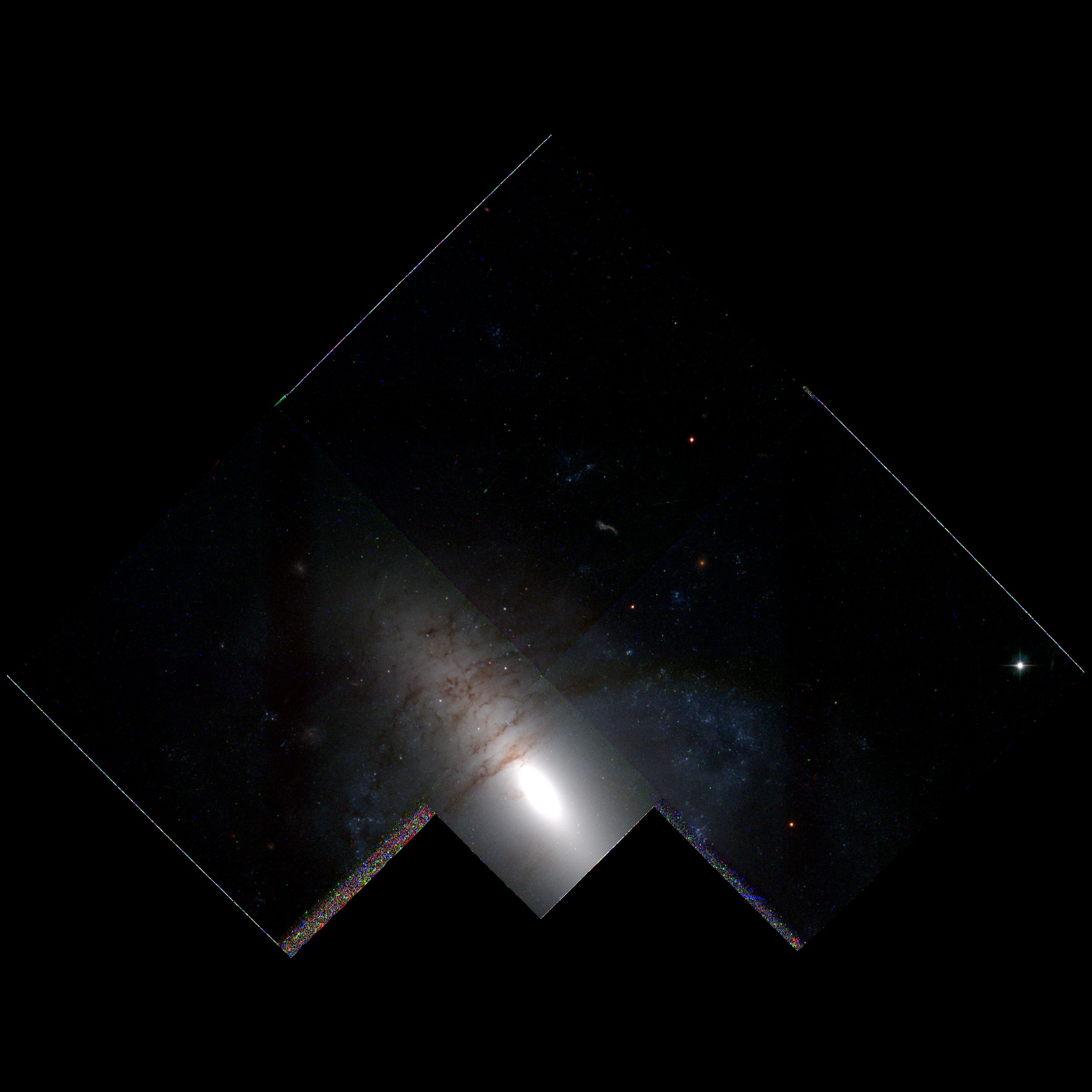
Hubble Space Telescope (HST) image

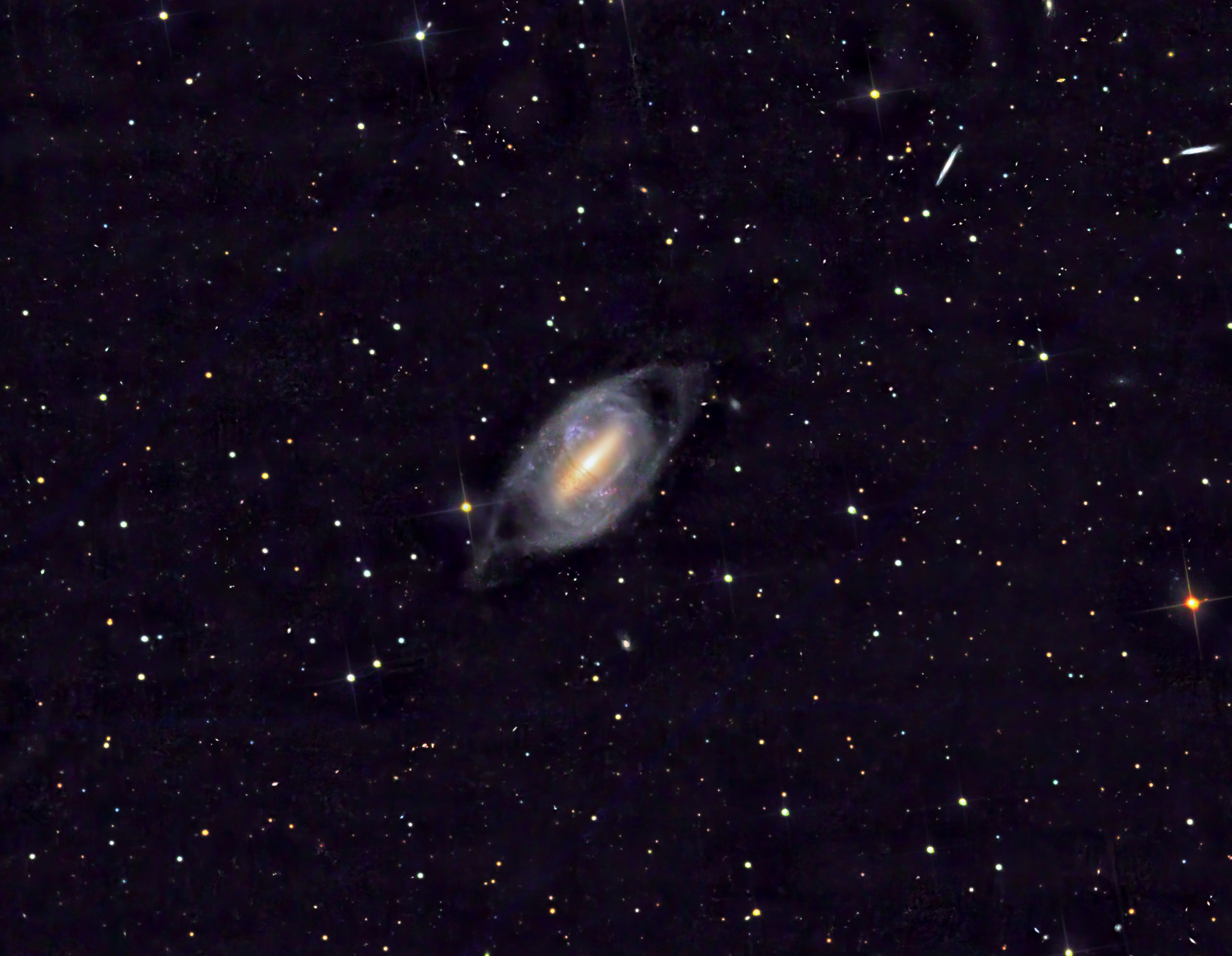
NGC2685 imaged by amateur astronomer W4SM with 17" PlaneWave astrograph
