= NGC 4650A =

Polar-ring galaxy in the constellation Centaurus

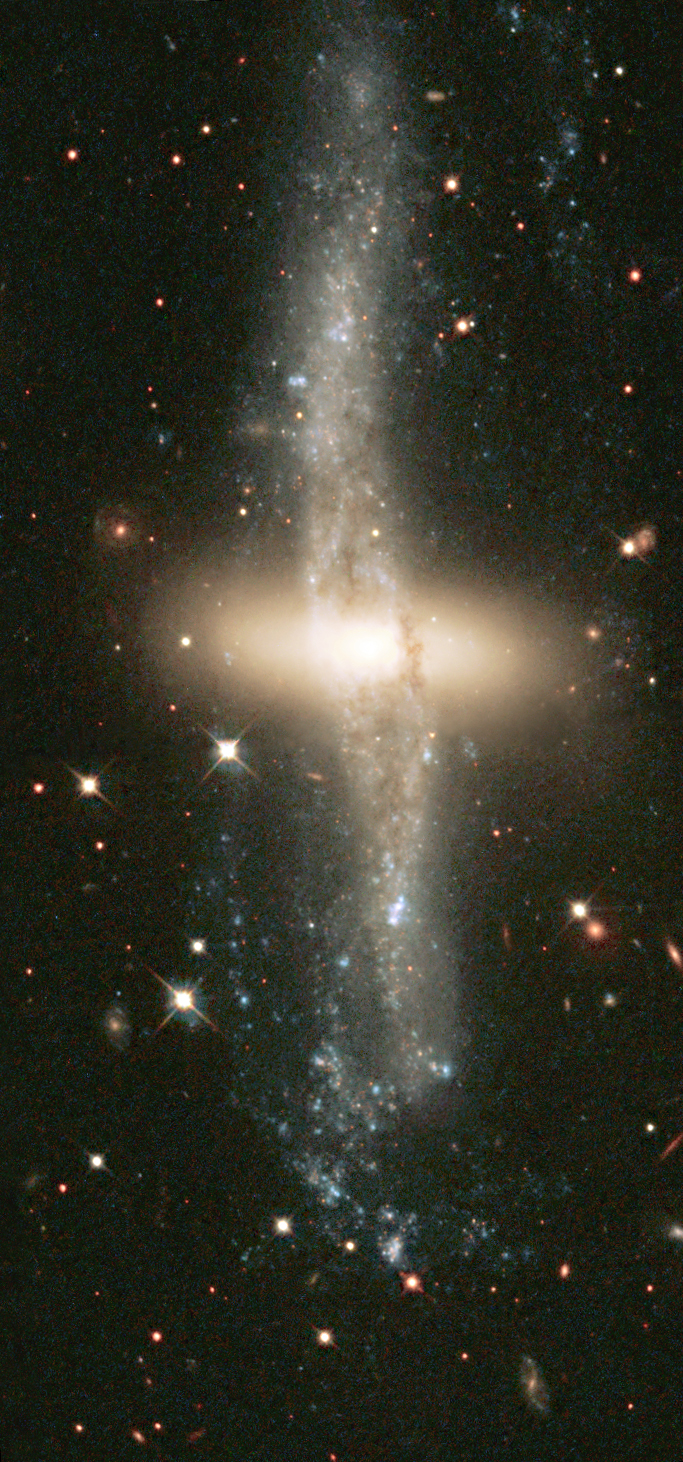
- A Hubble Space Telescope (HST) image of NGC 4650A

Observation data (J2000 epoch)
- Constellation: Centaurus
- Right ascension: 12^{h} 44^{m} 49.035^{s}
- Declination: −40° 42′ 51.69″
- Redshift: 0.009607
- Heliocentric radial velocity: 2,908.5±3.6 km/s
- Distance: 130 Mly (39.8 Mpc)
- Group or cluster: Centaurus Cluster
- Apparent magnitude (V): 13.3
- Apparent magnitude (B): 14.72
- Magnitude (K): 11.02

Characteristics
- Type: S0/a pec
- Mass: 4.5×10^{10} M_{☉}
- Apparent size (V): 1.6′ × 0.8′
- Notable features: Polar-ring galaxy

Other designations
- NGC 4650A, LEDA 42951, PGC 42951

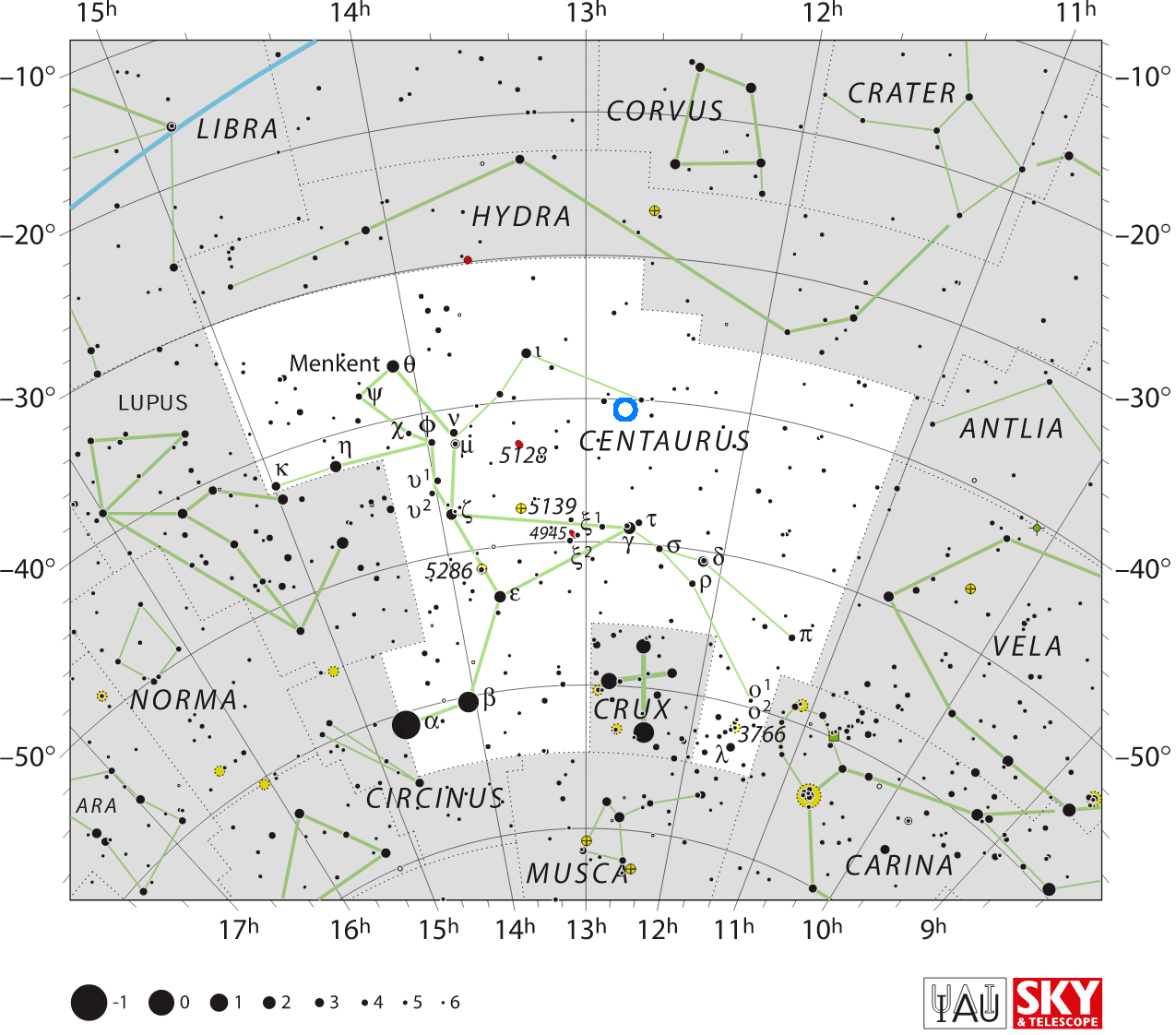
The location of NGC 4650A (circled in blue)

NGC 4650A is a lenticular galaxy of the rare polar-ring type, located in the southern constellation of Centaurus. It has an apparent visual magnitude of 13.3 and spans an angular size of 1.6′ × 0.8′. This galaxy is located at an estimated distance of 130 million light-years (39.8 Mpc) and is receding with a heliocentric radial velocity of 2,908.5 km/s. It should not be confused with the nearby spiral galaxy NGC 4650; the physical distance between both galaxies is only about 6 times the optical radius of NGC 4650. NGC 4650A lies in a chain of five galaxies in the Centaurus Cluster.

== Observations ==
Early studies of this galaxy beginning in 1967 identified it as peculiar, although it was not included in Halton Arp's Atlas of Peculiar Galaxies. It has the appearance of having two very different components. In the middle is what resembles an elliptical galaxy with an axial ratio of around 3, which would give it a morphological classification of E6–7. Its major axis is aligned along a NW-SE direction. Oriented at nearly right angles to this central component is a fainter, S-shaped feature resembling a spiral or ring galaxy seen almost edge-on. The elliptical central nucleus does not appear to be especially active.

During the 1990s, attempts were made to model the dark matter distribution around the galaxy, with only partial success. A more extensive mapping of the neutral hydrogen distribution was made in 1997. The observed shapes and motions suggested that the polar disk most likely possessed two spiral arms, which produce the S-shape seen in images. The total flux suggested a neutral hydrogen mass of 8×10^{9} M_{☉}.

Imaging of the central S0 (lenticular) feature by the Hubble Space Telescope showed a complex pattern of dust lanes extending inward toward the nucleus, while the outer portions of the S0 showed an aging stellar population that had ceased new star formation some 3–5 billion years ago. The outer polar galaxy displays a complex shape that shows warping. Gas is accumulating to form a ring that encircles the central S0 at a radius of 3 thousand light-years (1 kpc). The inner disk is inclined about 63°, then flattens out with increasing radius, forming what appears to be two star-forming spiral arms. Most of the light from the polar feature is coming from stars less than a billion years old. The youngest detected stars are 6.5 Myr old.

Measurements of the motions of stars in NGC 4650A showed a consistent rotation pattern in the polar ring. The rotation curve is flat, providing more support for a disk structure rather than a ring. There is no counter-rotating streams of stars. Both the structure and shape of NGC 4650A support the idea of a merger of two separate galaxies. The central component appears to be an oblate spheroid supported by rotation. Careful examination of the central part of the disk shows that the stellar motions extend right to the middle, with the two components co-existing with separate rotations.

== Supernova ==
On April 29, 1990, Oscar Pizarro discovered a supernova in the polar ring of NGC 4650A, positioned 13.4″ east and 44.9″ south of the galactic nucleus. This identification was made from a photographic plate taken April 27 with the ESO Schmidt telescope at La Silla Observatory. Given the identifier SN 1990I, this event was later classified as a Type Ib supernova. Based on light curve data, SN 1990I was estimated to have begun April 11 and reached peak light on April 29.
