= NGC 5300 =

Spiral galaxy in the constellation Virgo

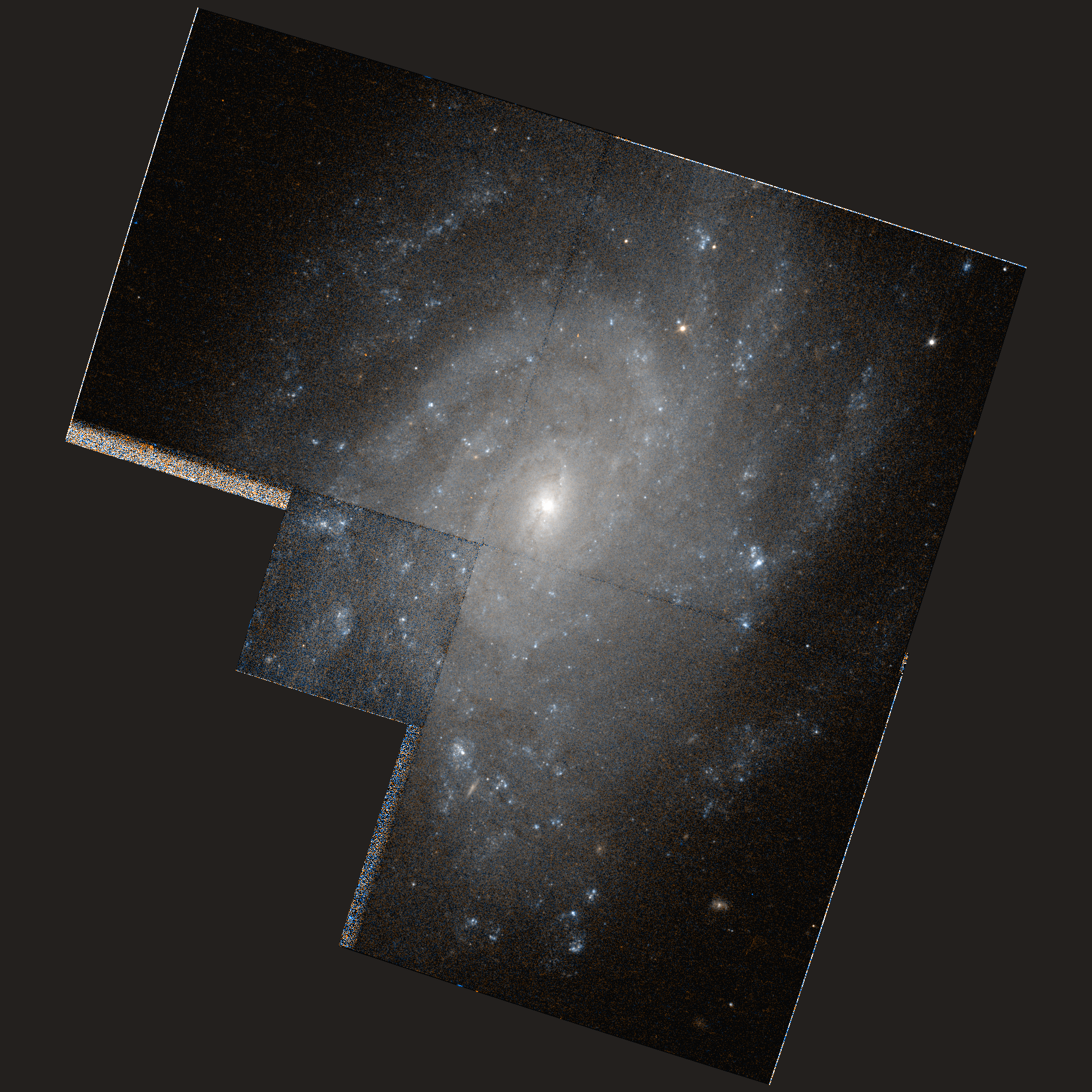
- NGC 5300 imaged by the Hubble Space Telescope

Observation data (J2000 epoch)
- Constellation: Virgo
- Right ascension: 13^{h} 48^{m} 16^{s}
- Declination: +03° 57′ 03″
- Redshift: 1171 ± 6 km/s
- Apparent magnitude (V): 13.6

Characteristics
- Type: SAB(r)c
- Apparent size (V): 2.2′ × 1.4′

Other designations
- UGC 8727, PGC 48959

NGC 5300 is a face-on spiral galaxy in the constellation Virgo. It is a member of the NGC 5364 Group of galaxies, itself one of the Virgo III Groups strung out to the east of the Virgo Supercluster of galaxies.
