= NGC 5198 =

Galaxy in the constellation Canes Venatici

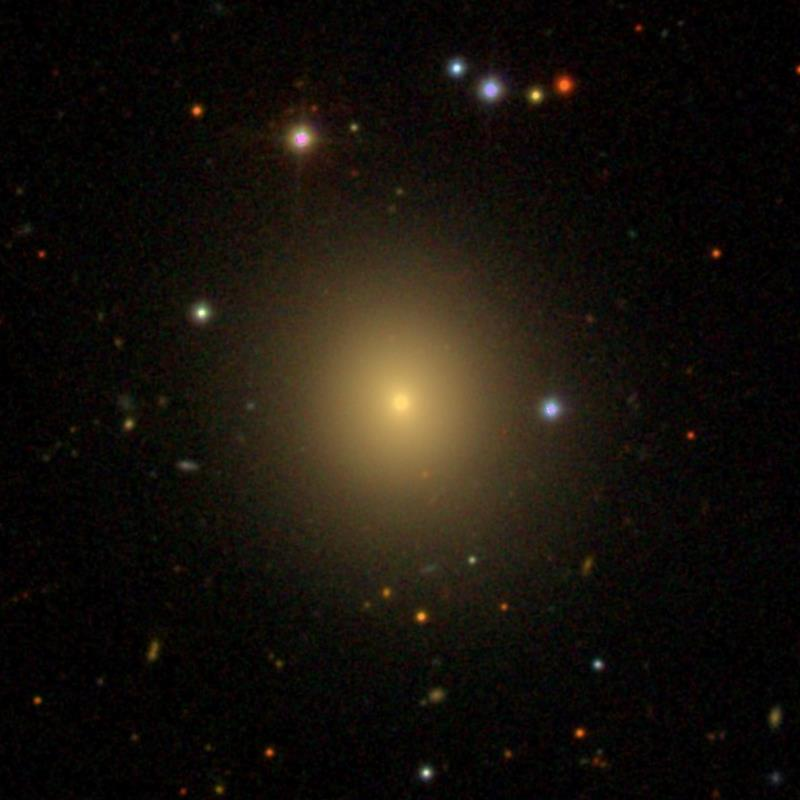
- SDSS image of NGC 5198

Observation data (J2000 epoch)
- Constellation: Canes Venatici
- Right ascension: 13^{h} 30^{m} 11.411^{s}
- Declination: +46° 40′ 14.99″
- Redshift: 0.008466
- Heliocentric radial velocity: 2527 ± 48 km/s
- Distance: 129 Mly (39.6 Mpc)
- Apparent magnitude (V): 11.78
- Apparent magnitude (B): 12.71

Characteristics
- Type: E1-2:
- Size: ~98,500 ly (30.20 kpc)

Other designations
- UGC 8499, MCG +08-25-015, PGC 47441

NGC 5198 is an elliptical galaxy in the constellation Canes Venatici. It was discovered by the astronomer William Herschel on May 12, 1787.
