= Polar-ring galaxy =

Galaxy with an outer ring of gas and stars

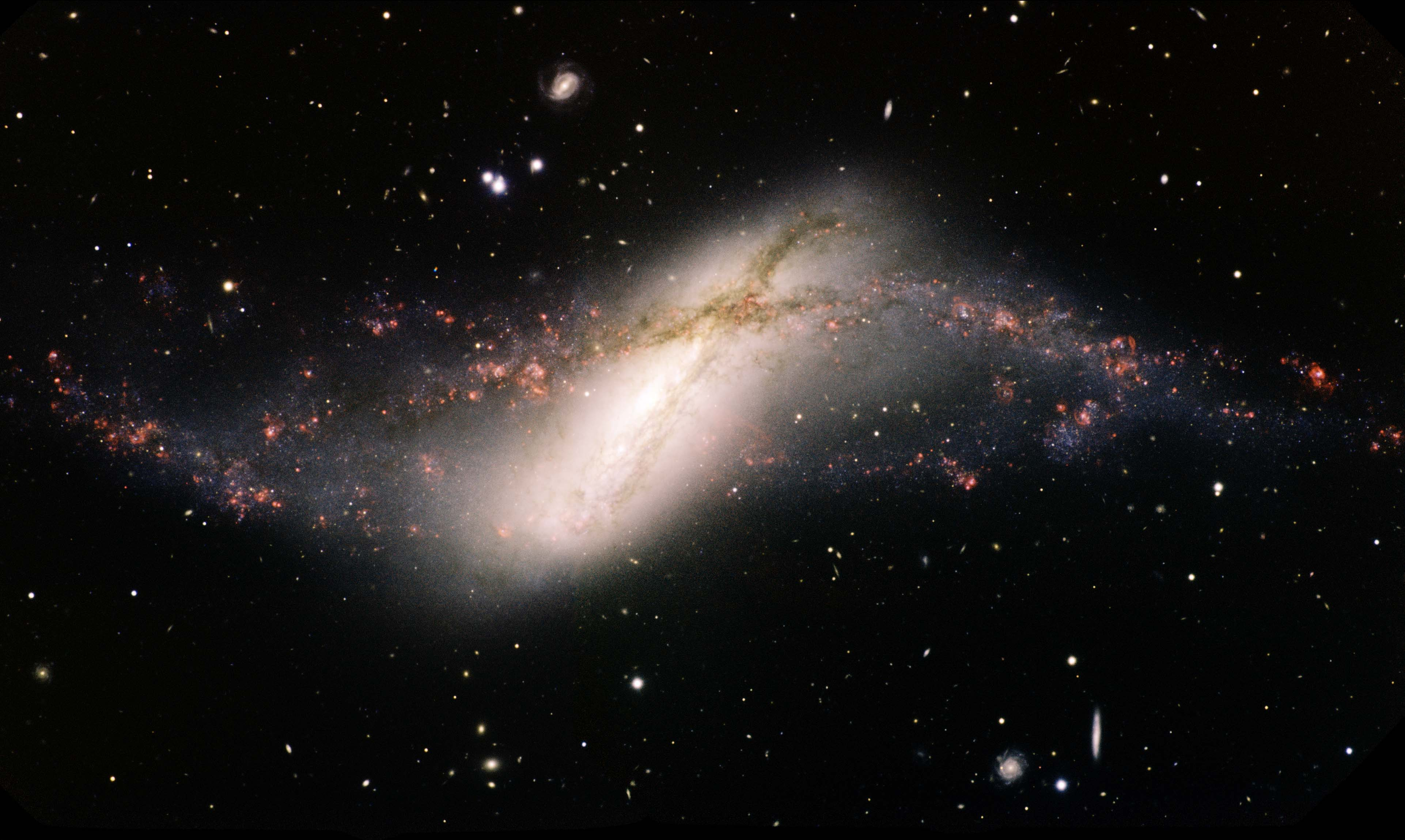
NGC 660 showing polar-galaxy structure

A polar-ring galaxy is a type of galaxy with an outer ring of gas and stars that rotates over the poles of the galaxy. These polar rings are thought to form when two galaxies gravitationally interact with each other. One possibility is that a material is tidally stripped from a passing galaxy to produce the polar ring. The other possibility is that a smaller galaxy collides orthogonally with the plane of rotation of the larger galaxy, with the smaller galaxy effectively forming the polar-ring structure.

The best-known polar-ring galaxies are S0s (lenticular galaxies), but from the physical point of view they are part of a wider category of galaxies, including several ellipticals.

The first four S0 galaxies that were identified as polar-ring galaxies were NGC 2685, NGC 4650A, A 0136 -0801, and ESO 415 -G26. While these galaxies have been extensively studied, many other polar-ring galaxies have since been identified. Polar-ring S0 galaxies may be found around 0.5% of all nearby lenticular galaxies, and it is possible that 5% of lenticular galaxies may have had polar rings at some point during their lifetimes.

The first polar-ring elliptical galaxies were identified in 1978. They were NGC 5128, NGC 5363, NGC 1947 and Cygnus A, while the polar-ring S0 galaxies NGC 2685 and NGC 4650A were at that time indicated as resulting from similar formation processes. Only some years later, when the first observations of the stellar and gas motion of polar-ring elliptical and S0 galaxies were possible with a better spectroscopic technology, the external origin of the gaseous rings was clarified. In addition to the best-known example, NGC 5128 (Cen A), a very regular polar ring elliptical, is NGC 5266.

== Polar-ring Catalogue ==
The Polar-Ring Catalogue, an atlas of 157 possible polar-ring galaxies, with 51 related objects. Four sections (A, B, C, and D) exist, including kinematically confirmed polar-ring galaxies (category A), good candidates based on their morphological appearance (category B), possible candidates (category C), and possibly related objects (category D). There are 6 galaxies in section A which are kinematically confirmed galaxies. There are 27 in section B, which are good candidates. In section C, there are 73 galaxies, which are possible candidates. There are 51 galaxies in section D, which are related objects, probably not classified as polar-ring galaxies.

== SDSS-based Polar-ring Catalogue ==
In 2011, a new catalogue of polar-ring galaxy candidates was published using images from the Sloan Digital Sky Survey, supplementing the PRC and significantly increasing the number of known candidate PRGs. The catalog is based on the results of the original Galaxy Zoo project. With 275 objects being included in the catalog, 70 objects have been identified as "best candidates and 53 galaxies are categorized as PRG-related objects, primarily consisting of galaxies with highly twisted discs and mergers. Furthermore, 37 galaxies with their assumed polar rings highly tilted towards the observer (appearing nearly directly in front). On average, the SPRC objects are dimmer and positioned at a greater distance compared to the galaxies from the PRC. However, the list does contain numerous new nearby potential PRGs.

In 2019, 31 new polar-ring galaxy candidates were found with the use of the Sloan Digital Sky Survey.

== Gallery ==
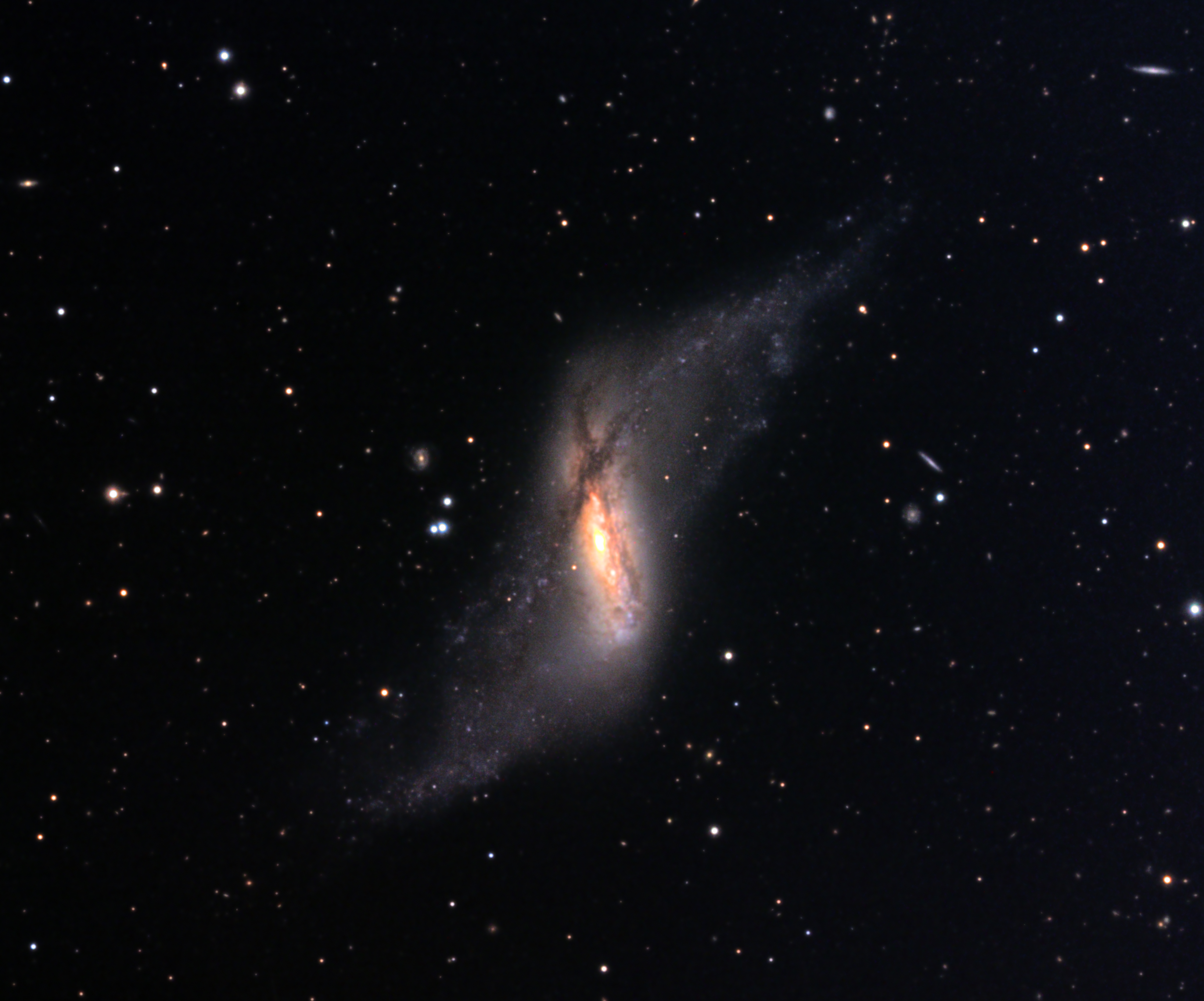
NGC660 polar galaxy. 24-inch telescope on Mt. Lemmon, AZ.

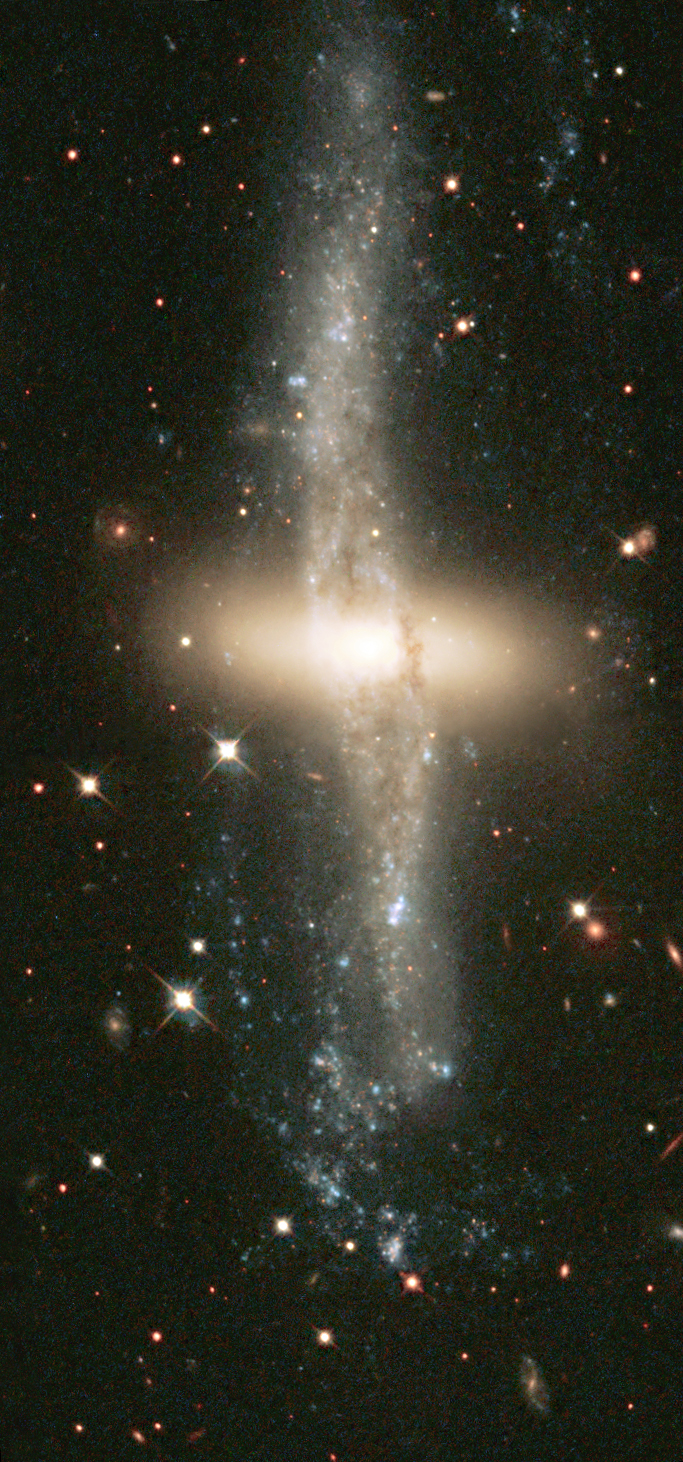
NGC 4650A, an example of a polar-ring galaxy.

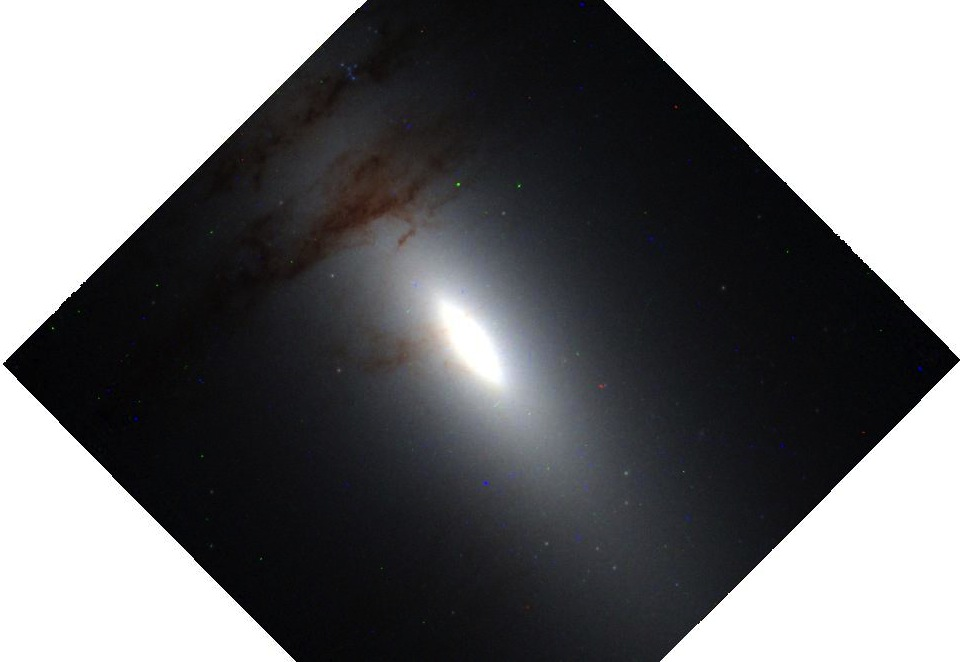
NGC 2685, HST

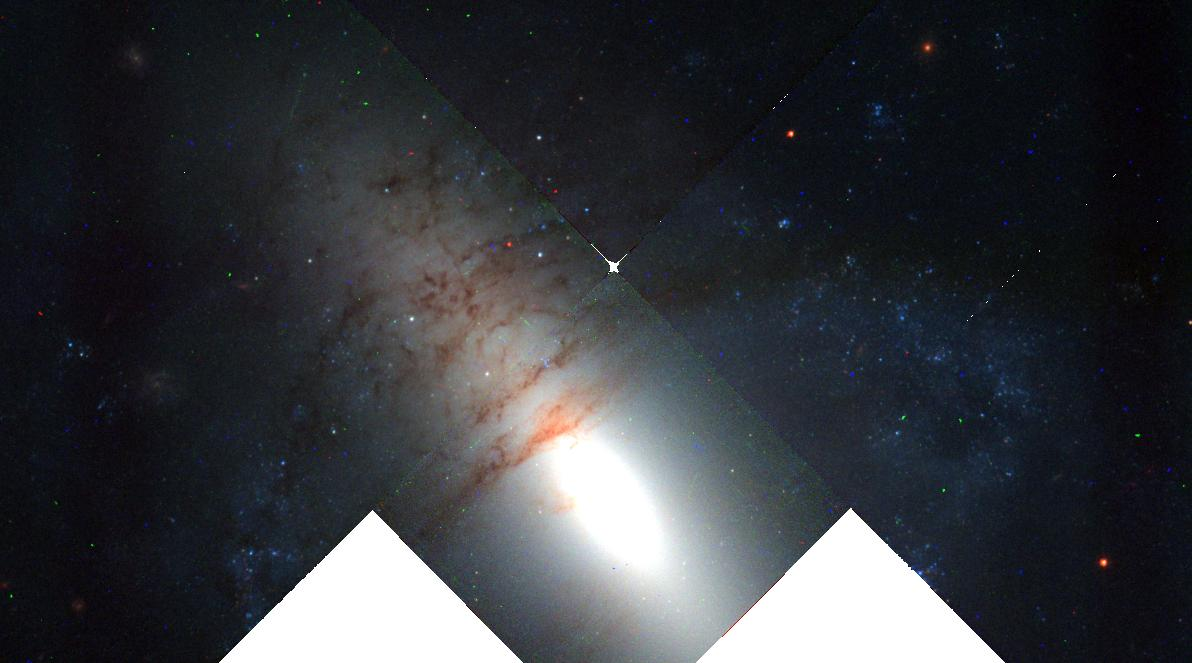
NGC 2685, HST (A more detailed view.)

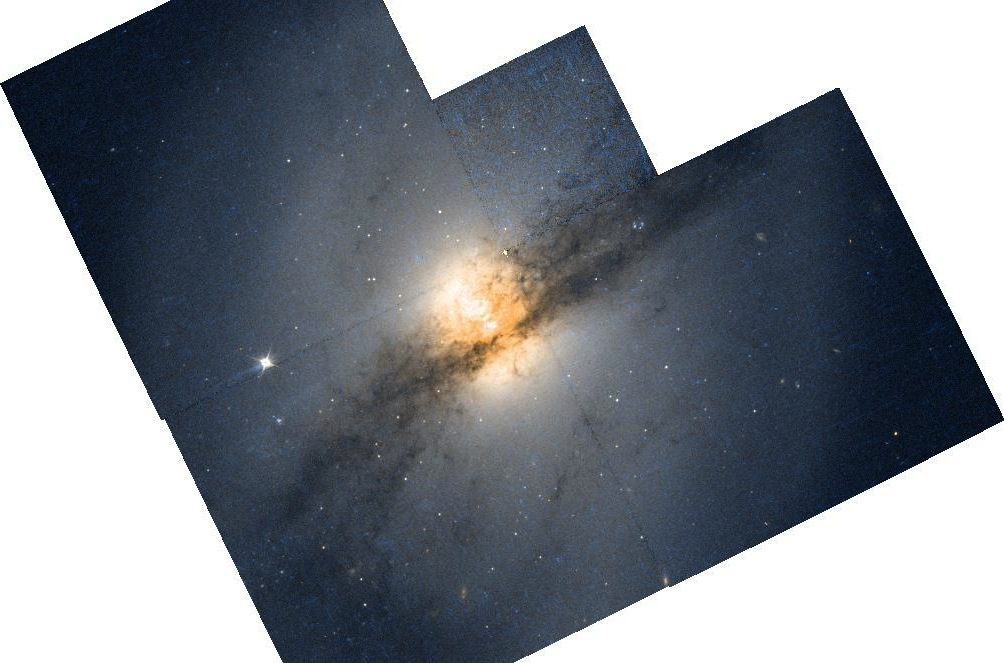
NGC 3718 HST

== See also ==
- List of polar-ring galaxies
- Ring galaxy – Galaxy with an annular appearance
