= Peculiar galaxy =

Galaxy of unusual size, shape, or composition

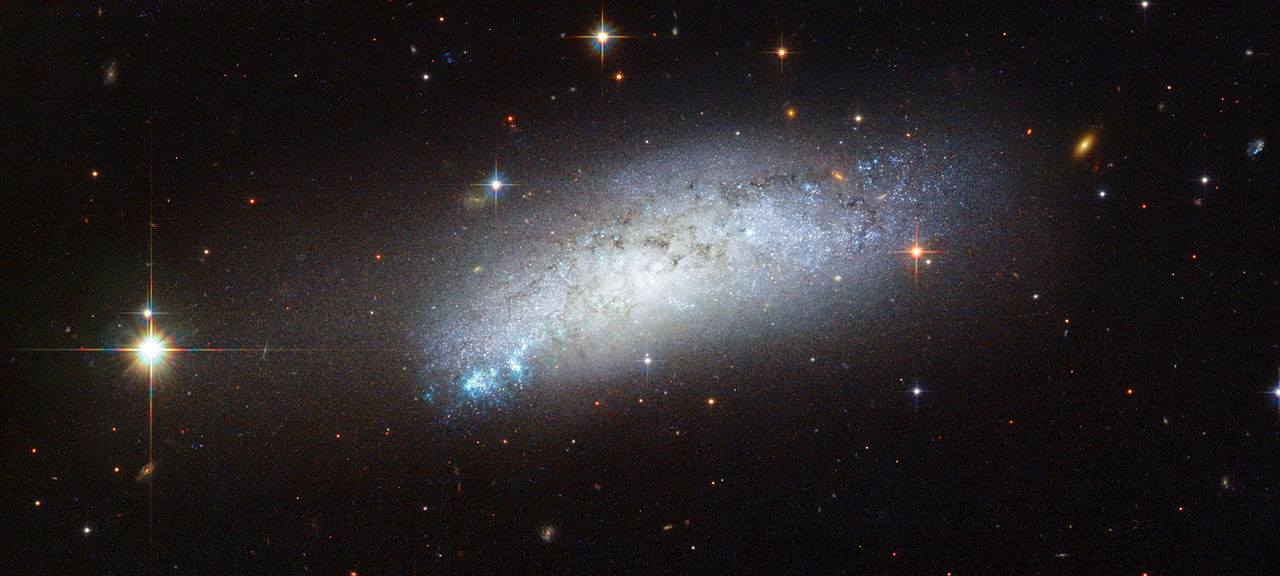
ESO 162-17 is an example of a peculiar galaxy which is 40 million light-years away in the constellation Carina.

A peculiar galaxy is a galaxy of unusual size, shape, or composition. Between five and ten percent of known galaxies are categorized as peculiar. Astronomers have identified two types of peculiar galaxies: interacting galaxies and active galactic nuclei (AGN).

When two galaxies come close to each other, their mutual gravitational forces can cause them to acquire highly irregular shapes. The terms 'peculiar galaxy' and 'interacting galaxy' have now become synonymous because the majority of peculiar galaxies attribute their forms to such gravitational forces.

== Formation ==
Scientists hypothesize that many peculiar galaxies are formed by the collision of two or more galaxies. As such, peculiar galaxies tend to host more active galactic nuclei than normal galaxies, indicating that they contain supermassive black holes. Many peculiar galaxies experience starbursts, or episodes of rapid star formation, due to the galaxies merging. The periods of elevated star formation and the luminosity resulting from active galactic nuclei cause peculiar galaxies to be slightly bluer in color than other galaxies.

Studying peculiar galaxies can offer insights on other types of galaxies by providing useful information on galactic formation and evolution. Arp mapped peculiar galaxies in his 1966 Atlas of Peculiar Galaxies. Arp states that "the peculiarities of the galaxies pictured in this Atlas represent perturbations, deformations, and interactions which should enable us to analyze the nature of the real galaxies which we observe and which are too remote to experiment on directly."

== Notation ==
Peculiar galaxies are notated by an additional "p" or "pec" (depending on the exact convention) after the Hubble type of the galaxy.

== See also ==
- Atlas of Peculiar Galaxies
- Irregular galaxy
- Starburst galaxy
- Arp 87
- Mayall's Object
- Arp 147
