= AM 2026-424 =

Interacting ring galaxy in Microscopium

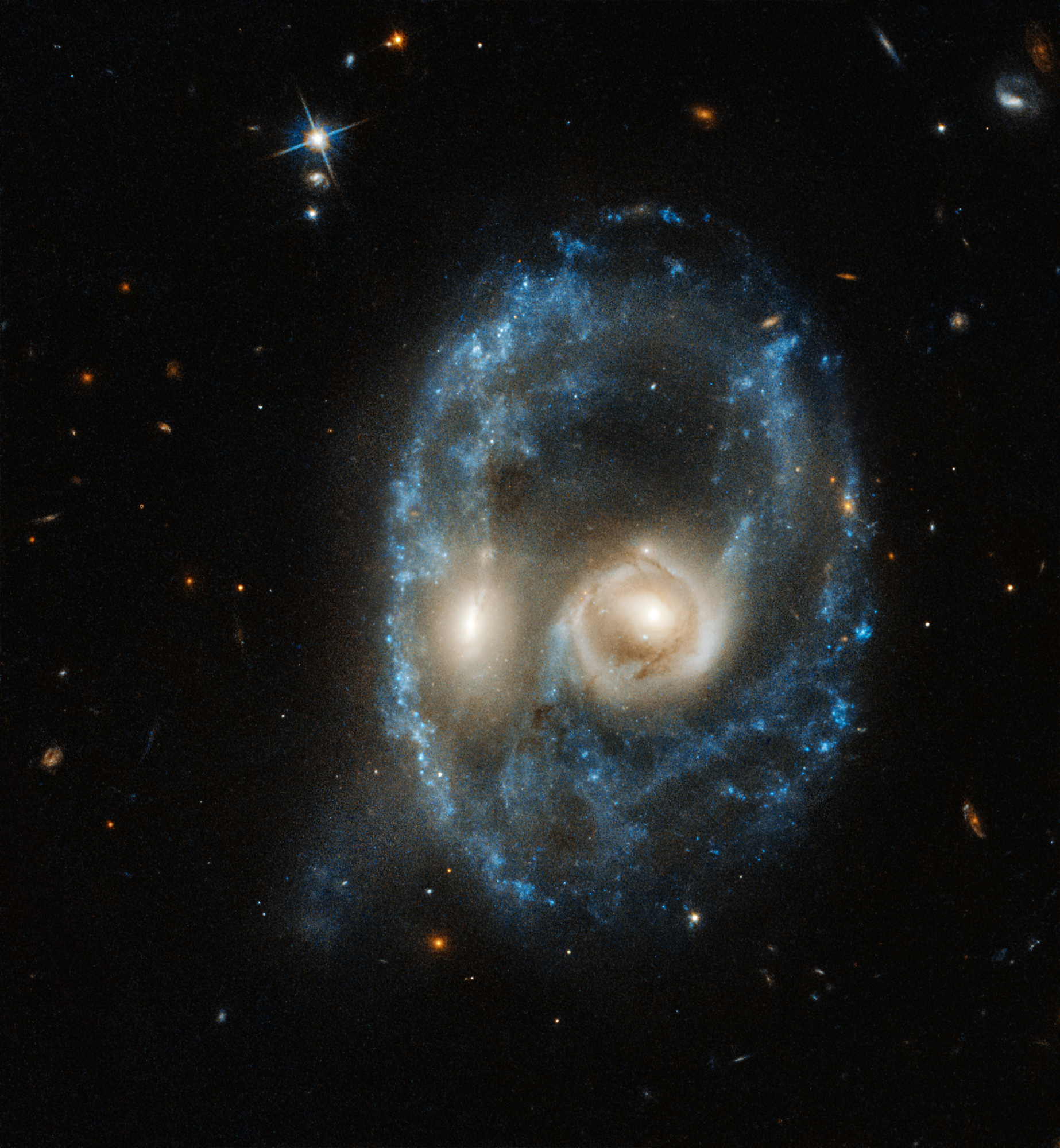
- AM 2026-424 imaged by the Hubble Space Telescope

Observation data (J2000 epoch)
- Constellation: Microscopium
- Right ascension: 20^{h} 29^{m} 32.5004^{s}
- Declination: −42° 30′ 22.779″
- Redshift: 0.05192
- Heliocentric radial velocity: 15564 ± 45 km/s
- Distance: 704 Mly (216 Mpc)
- Apparent magnitude (V): 14.5
- Apparent magnitude (B): 14.9
- Absolute magnitude (V): −22.2
- Absolute magnitude (B): −21.8

Characteristics
- Type: S(r)c
- Size: 0.98′ × 0.67′

Other designations
- AM 2026-424, ESO 285- G 019, ESO 202609-4240.3, WISEA J202932.50-423022.7, 2MASX J20293243-4230230

AM 2026-424 (also known as ESO 285-19) is a system of interacting galaxies located approximately 704 million light-years (216 megaparsecs) away in the southern constellation of Microscopium. It is classified as a collisional ring galaxy, formed as the result of a violent, head-on galactic collision. The system is recognized to a face or pair of glowing eyes, with the two galactic nuclei appearing as eyes and surrounding ring of young blue stars outlining a face-like structure.

== Discovery ==
The system was first cataloged in the Catalogue of Southern Peculiar Galaxies and Associations (AM Catalogue), compiled by astronomers Halton Arp and Barry F. Madore in 1987. It consists of two principal galactic components or nuclei: the western component cataloged as PGC 64801, and the eastern component cataloged as PGC 64805 (also designated as ESO 285-19A).

== Characteristics ==
The ring structure of AM 2026-424 spans roughly 200,000 light-years across, which is nearly twice the diameter of the Milky Way. Unlike stable ring galaxies like Hoag's Object, which feature a symmetric, isolated ring surrounding a single core, AM 2026-424 is a short-lived structure. The head-on collision pulled and stretched the galaxies' disks of gas, dust, and stars outward, triggering a massive wave of starburst activity that forms the temporary ring.

Because the two galactic nuclei are still distinctly visible and separate, astronomers determine that the two colliding galaxies were of roughly equal size prior to the impact. This disrupts the more common cosmic scenario where a larger galaxy cannibalizes a much smaller companion. The system is expected to fully merge into a single, larger galaxy over the next few hundred million years.

== See also ==
- Cartwheel Galaxy
- Mayall's Object
- Hoag's Object
- AM 0644−741
- Arp-Madore 417-391
- ESO 69-6
- PGC 6240
