= UGC 1840 =

Interacting galaxies in the constellation Andromeda

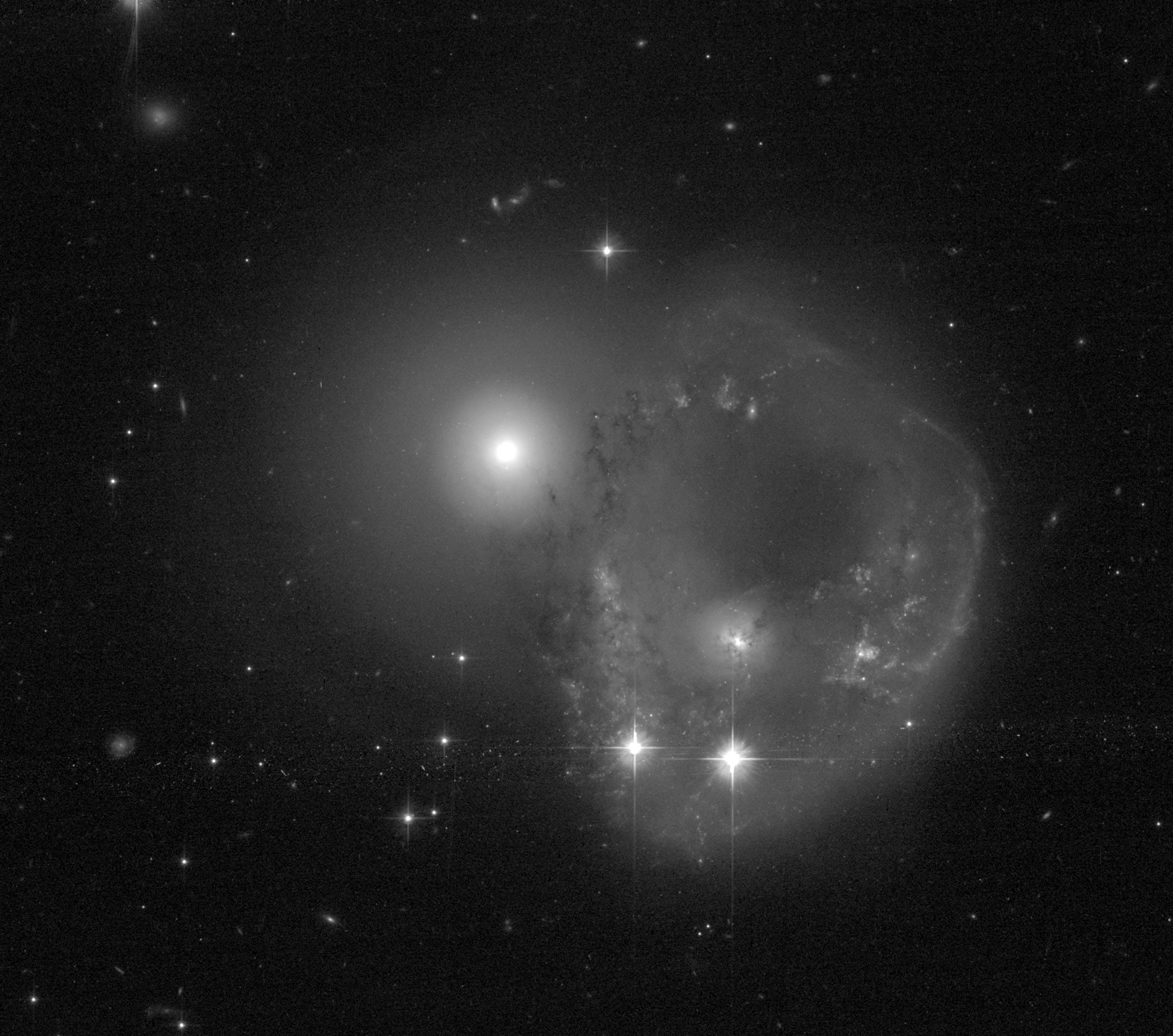
- UGC 1840 imaged by the Hubble Space Telescope

Observation data (J2000 epoch)
- Constellation: Andromeda
- Right ascension: 02^{h} 23^{m} 08.4268^{s}
- Declination: +41° 22′ 20.031″
- Redshift: 0.018096
- Heliocentric radial velocity: 5,420 km/s
- Distance: 258.5 Mly (79.1 Mpc)

Characteristics
- Type: Peculiar
- Size: ~131,100 ly (40.20 kpc) (estimated)
- Notable features: Collisional ring galaxy

Other designations
- IRAS 02200+4108, 2MASX J02231142+4122047, Arp 145, MCG +07-06-002, PGC 9060 & 9062, CGCG 538-056, HFLLZOA F264, V Zw 229

UGC 1840, also known as Arp 145, are a pair of interacting galaxies located 250 million light-years away from the Solar System in the constellation Andromeda. The earliest known reference to the pair of galaxies is in part 2 of the Morphological Catalogue of Galaxies, published in 1964, where it is listed as MCG +07-06-002.

Made up of two galaxies, UGC 1840 NED01 (PGC 9060) and UGC 1840 NED02 (PGC 9062), the two galaxies had recently collided with each other in which the elliptical galaxy has penetrated through the spiral galaxy's nucleus leaving a hole in its middle, thus forming a ring galaxy. With a diameter of 1.3 arc minutes, close to 100,000 thousand light-years, they are roughly the same size as the Milky Way.

Both galaxies are listed as Arp 145 in the Atlas of Peculiar Galaxies which was created by Halton Arp. They fall under the category of objects that have emanating material and both classified as galaxies that have ring systems.
