= Arp-Madore 417-391 =

Ring galaxy

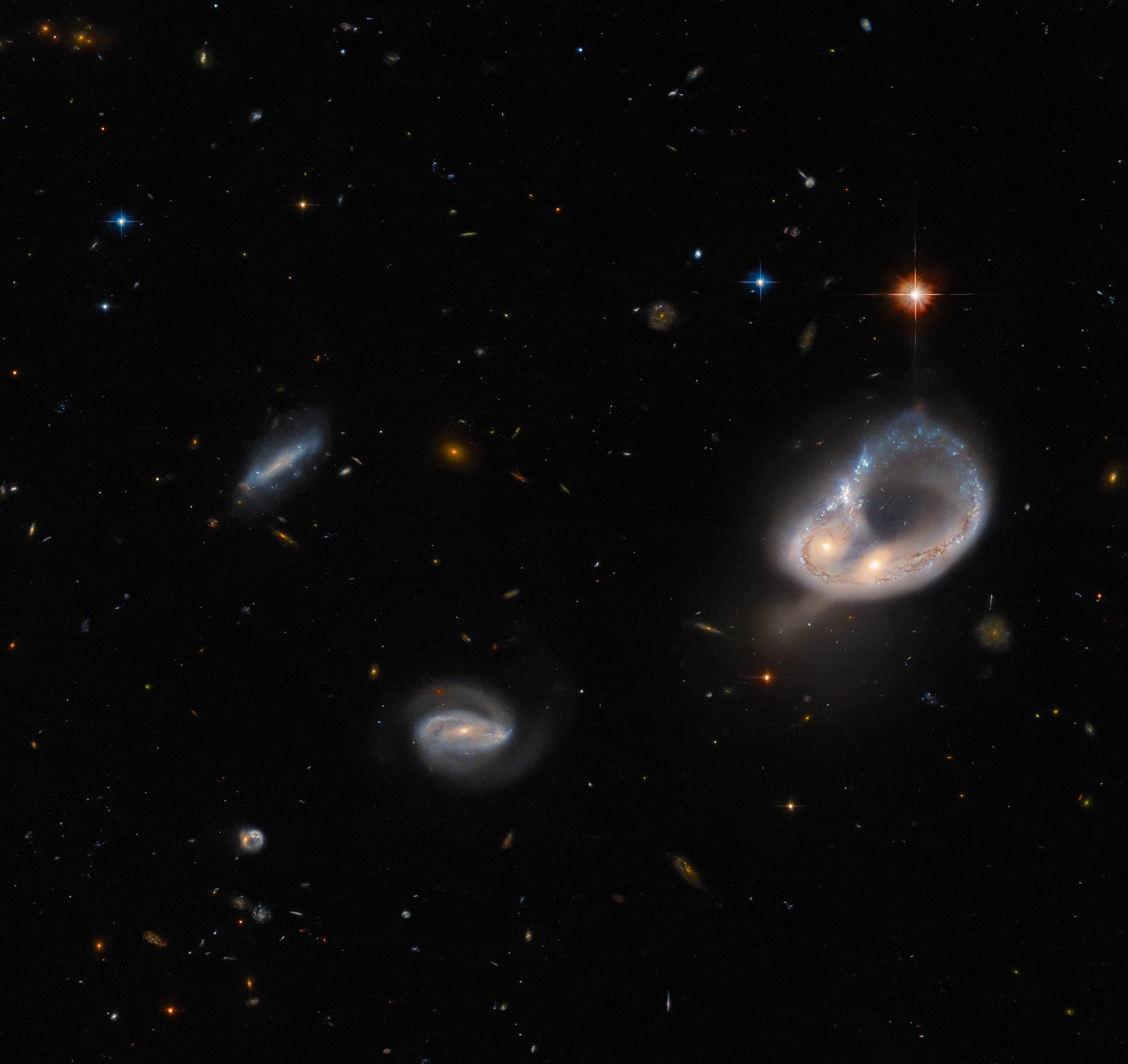
- Image of Arp-Madore 417-391 (NASA/ESA Hubble Space Telescope)

Observation data (J2000 epoch)
- Constellation: Eridanus
- Right ascension: 04^{h} 19^{m} 39.3^{s}
- Declination: −39° 10′ 24″
- Redshift: 0.050585 ± 0.000150
- Heliocentric radial velocity: 15165 ± 45 km/s
- Galactocentric velocity: 15136 ± 45 km/s
- Distance: 671 ± 47 Mly
- Apparent magnitude (B): 15.17

Characteristics
- Type: Ring galaxy
- Size: 0.74′ × 0.51′

Other designations
- AM 0417-391, PGC 14881, ESO 303-IG011

Arp-Madore 417-391 is a ring galaxy located 671 million light-years from Earth in the constellation of Eridanus. It is classified as a ring galaxy.

== Discovery and Observations ==
The system was first cataloged in the Catalogue of Southern Peculiar Galaxies and Associations in 1987 by astronomer Halton Arp and Barry F. Mandore.

In November 2022, the European Space Agency and NASA released a detailed image of the system captures by the Hubble Space Telescope's Advanced Camera for Surveys (ACS). This image campaign targeted a list of peculiar objects from the Arp-Mandore catalogue to help identify observation candidates for the JWST.

== Characteristics ==
This galaxy is a pair of interacting galaxies that are merging being distorted by each other's gravity, forming a massive ring shape with the two cores of the galaxies located next to each other on the side of the ring.

== See also ==
- AM 0644−741
- ESO 69-6
- PGC 6240
- Ring galaxy
- Interacting galaxy
- Mayall's object
- Whirlpool galaxy
- Cartwheel galaxy
