= II Hz 4 =

Galaxy in the constellation Lynx

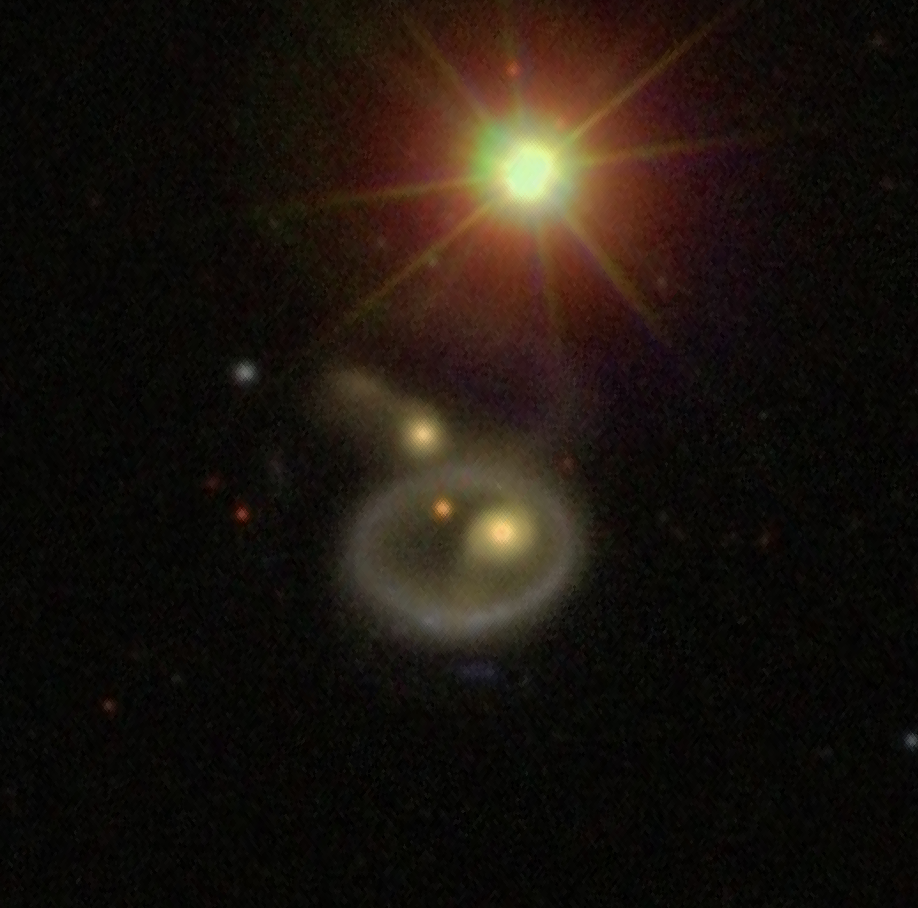
- SDSS image of II Hz 4

Observation data (J2000 epoch)
- Constellation: Lynx
- Right ascension: 08^{h} 58^{m} 33.04^{s}
- Declination: +37° 05′ 11.45″
- Redshift: 0.042876
- Heliocentric radial velocity: 12,854 ± 4 km/s
- Distance: 617.3 ± 43.2 Mly (189.28 ± 13.25 Mpc)
- magnitude (J): 12.57

Characteristics
- Type: Ring galaxy
- Size: ~233,000 ly (71.3 kpc) (estimated)

Other designations
- CGCG 180-023, 2MASX J08583307+3705112, PGC 25211, NSA 036200, MaNGA 01-165561, ASK 206604.0

II Hz 4 (short for II Herzog 4) is a ring galaxy located in the constellation of Lynx. The redshift of this galaxy is (z) 0.042 and it was first discovered by an astronomer named Emil Herzog in 1963. It was also subsequently designated as II Hz 4 by Halton Arp who described as an unusual object.

== Description ==
II Hz 4 is categorized as a classical double ring galaxy, depicted as having an off-center nucleus within its ring structure and a secondary faint ring feature. The nucleus galaxy is connected by two spiral arms that are described to have a faint appearance, with one of them shown as extended to join the ring feature located south.

A separate low-surface brightness ring-like feature is seen, with its size exactly similar to the ring. There is an apparent galaxy companion located with the faint northern ring with an extension terminating at the edge of the second ring feature. The rings have an approximate size of 21.6 x 15.7 and 22.8 and 16.9 kiloparsecs when imaged in both K-band and hydrogen-alpha imaging. A tidal tail with a blue appearance is seen connecting to the companion hinting an interaction.

A study published in December 1998, found the presence of ring knots in the galaxy. Based on observations, the estimated model ages of the knots are between six and eight million years. Evidence also found, the two nuclei of the galaxy have a recession velocity differences of 50 kilometers per seconds, with the primary ring feature being inclined at 42° and has a rotation velocity of 28 kilometers per seconds.
