= CGCG 396-002 =

Radio galaxy

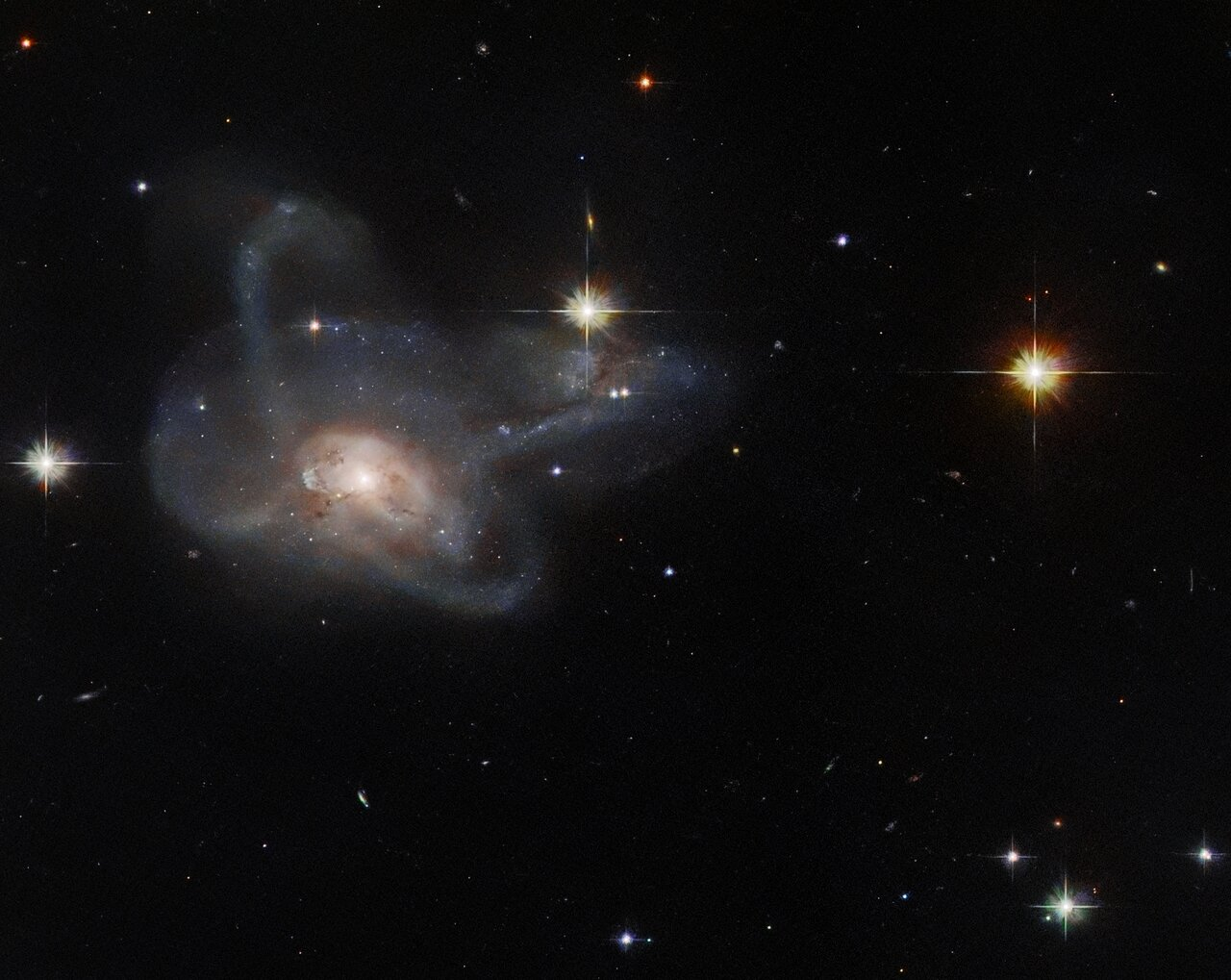
- CGCG 396-002 imaged by the Hubble Space Telescope

Observation data (J2000 epoch)
- Constellation: Orion
- Right ascension: 05^{h} 37^{m} 35.9756^{s}
- Declination: +01° 20′ 04.154″
- Redshift: 0.035370±0.000160
- Heliocentric radial velocity: 10,604±48 km/s
- Galactocentric velocity: 10604
- Distance: 512.0 ± 36.0 Mly (156.98 ± 11.03 Mpc)
- Apparent magnitude (B): 15.7

Characteristics
- Size: ~115,900 ly (35.54 kpc) (estimated)
- Apparent size (V): 0.8′ × 0.6′
- Notable features: Merging Galaxy

Other designations
- Z 396-2, 2MASX J05373599+0120038, LEDA 17532, PGC 17532

CGCG 396-002 is an unusual merging galaxy located in Orion. Its velocity with respect to the cosmic microwave background is 10,644±48 km/s, which corresponds to a Hubble distance of 512.0 ± 36.0 Mly (156.98 ± 11.03 Mpc). The first known reference to this galaxy comes from volume V of the Catalogue of Galaxies and of Clusters of Galaxies, compiled by Fritz Zwicky in 1965.

CGCG 396-002 is a radio galaxy, and is notable for its many arms and unique structure. The central part of the galaxy spans 50,000 light-years apart, but the arms surrounding it span outwards up to 165-170,000 light years.

In 2022 it was rediscovered in the Galaxy Zoo project, in which it was voted as one of the most interesting objects and to be imaged by the Hubble Space Telescope.
