= Arp 147 =

Interacting galaxy in the constellation Cetus

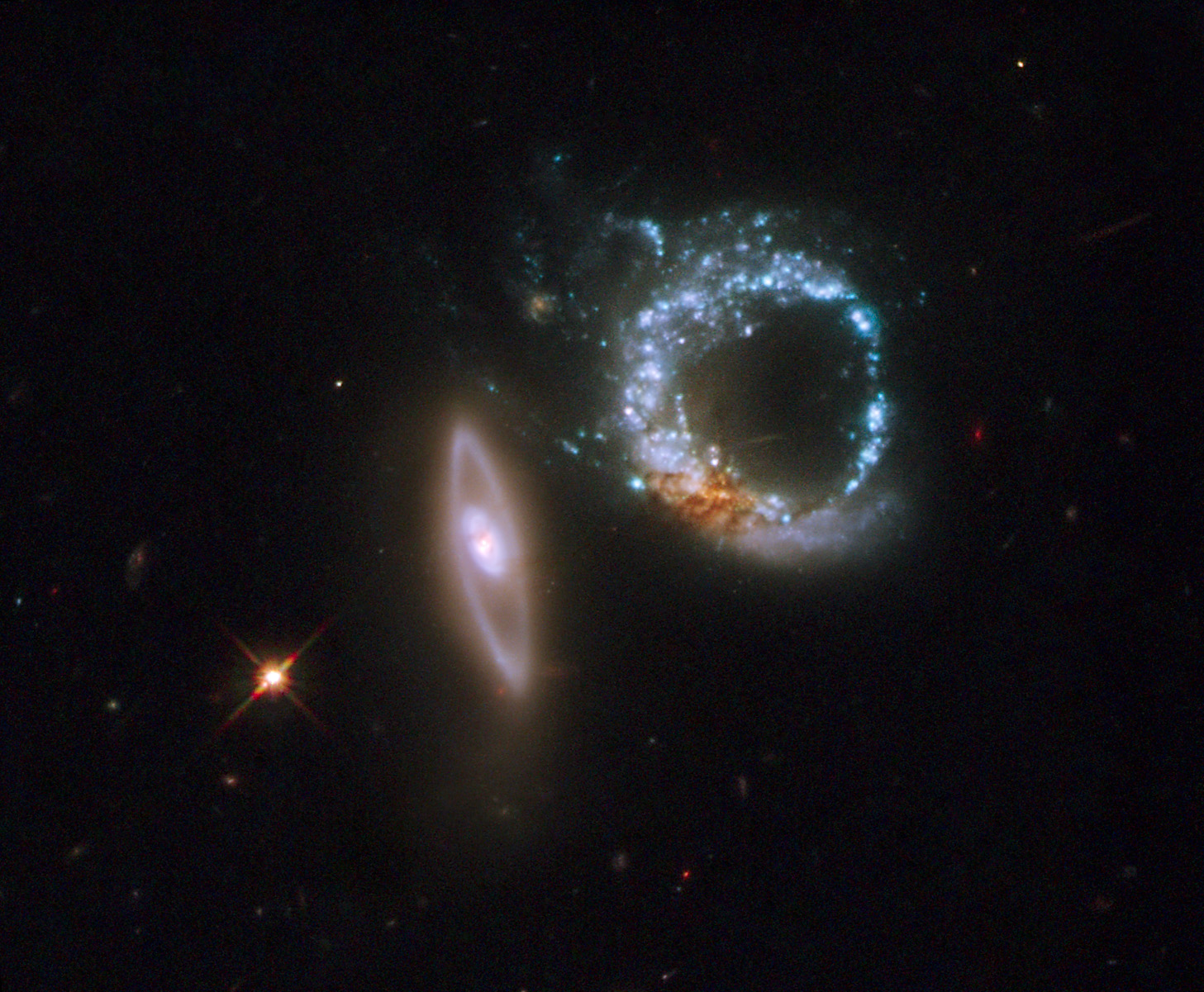
- Interacting galaxies Arp 147

Observation data (J2000 epoch)
- Constellation: Cetus
- Right ascension: 03^{h} 11^{m} 18.90^{s}
- Declination: +01° 18′ 52.99″
- Redshift: 0.03141
- Heliocentric radial velocity: 9,267 km/s
- Distance: 430–440 Mly (134.9 mpc)
- Apparent magnitude (V): 14.3

Characteristics
- Type: SB bc
- Mass: ~3.6 × 10^{11} M_{☉}
- Apparent size (V): 0.650' × 0.286'
- Notable features: massive H II region

Other designations
- IC 298/298A, PGC 11890, VV 787, SDSS J031120.03+011858.4

Arp 147 (also known as IC 298) is an interacting pair of ring galaxies. It lies 430 million to 440 million light years away in the constellation Cetus and does not appear to be part of any significant galaxy group. The system was originally discovered in 1893 by Stephane Javelle and is listed in the Atlas of Peculiar Galaxies.

The system was formed when a spiral galaxy (image right) collided with an elliptical galaxy (image left). The collision produced an expanding wave of star production (shown as bright blue) traveling at an effective speed of ≳100 km s^{−1} and began some 40 million years ago. The most extreme period of star formation is estimated to have ended 15 million years ago and as the young, super hot stars died (as exploding supernovas) they left behind neutron stars and black holes.

The right-side galaxy is 30,000 light years in diameter and is located 21,000 light years away from its partner galaxy. The entire system extends some 115,000 light years across.

In September 2008, Hubble's main data-handling unit failed. After the problem was corrected, the telescope's Wide Field Planetary Camera 2 was aimed at Arp 147 and the quality of the images taken assured NASA that Hubble was working properly.

== Main ring ==
The main ring contains nine bright X-ray sources which are black holes, each with a mass 10–20 times the mass of the Sun. The edge-to-edge expansion of the ring is 225 ± 8 km/s and there is very little rotation seen (47 ± 8 km/s).

It also has a star formation rate of approximately 4.68 solar masses per year. The reddish bulge in the main ring is thought to be the original galactic nucleus of the primary galaxy and comprises 30–50% of the total mass of the galaxy.

== Smaller galaxy ==
The smaller companion galaxy (left side) also contains an X-ray source which may be a poorly fed black hole.
