= Draco Supercluster =

Galaxy supercluster in the constellation Draco

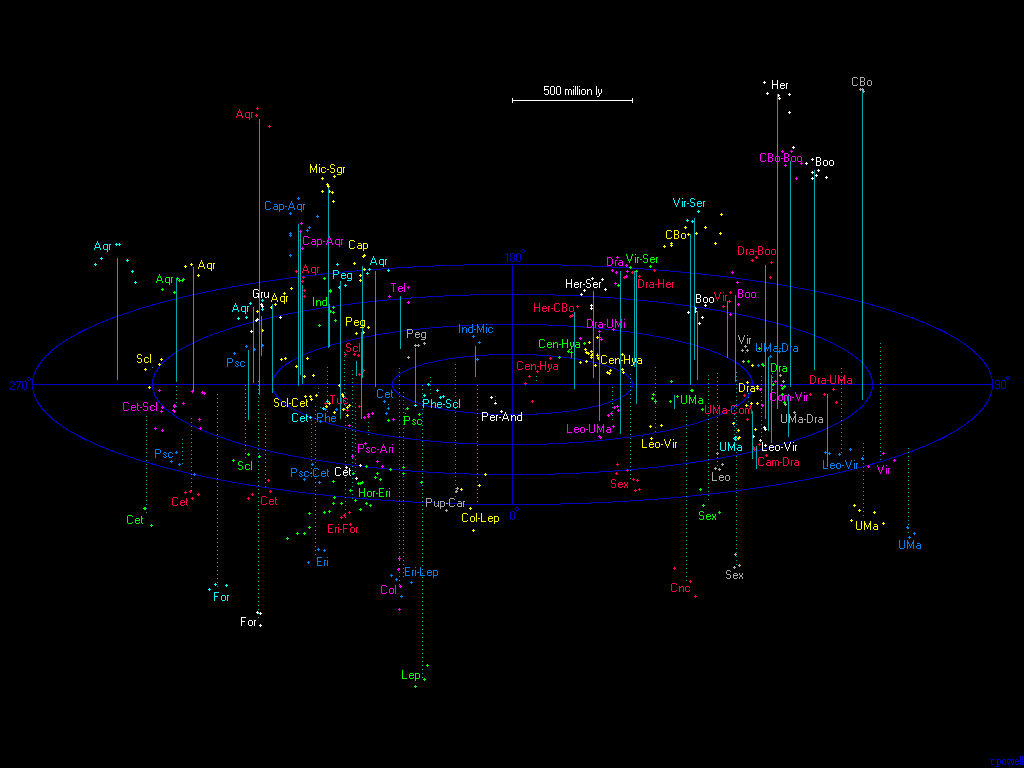
- Map of the Universe observable within a radius of 2 billion light years. The Draco supercluster is on the right of the supergalactic plane.

Observation data (Epoch J2000)
- Constellation: Draco
- Right ascension: 12^{h} 10^{m} 04.4^{s}
- Declination: +64° 01′ 19″
- Distance: 2 Gly
- Binding mass: ~10^{17} M_{☉}

Other designations
- SCl 114

Draco Supercluster (SCL 114) is a galaxy supercluster in the constellation Draco. It is located at a distance of 300 Mpc h^{−1} on a side of a void of diameter of about 130 Mpc h^{−1}. The near side of the void is bordered by the Ursa Major supercluster. The estimated size of the supercluster reaches 410 million light years and a mass of 10^{17} M_{☉}, making it one of the largest and most massive superclusters known in the observable universe.

The supercluster has 16 members, all with measured redshifts, and is one of the richest superclusters in the region. The members include Abell 1289, Abell 1302, Abell 1322, Abell 1366, Abell 1402, Abell 1406, Abell 1421, Abell 1432, Abell 1446, Abell 1477, Abell 1518, Abell 1559, Abell 1566, Abell 1621, Abell 1646, and Abell 1674.

== Gallery ==
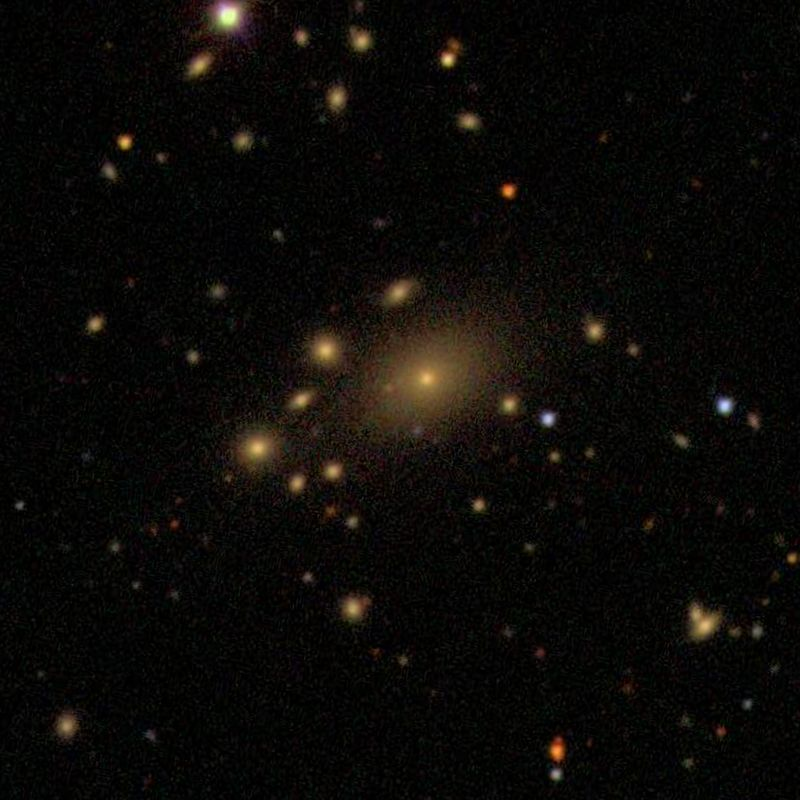
Abell 1302

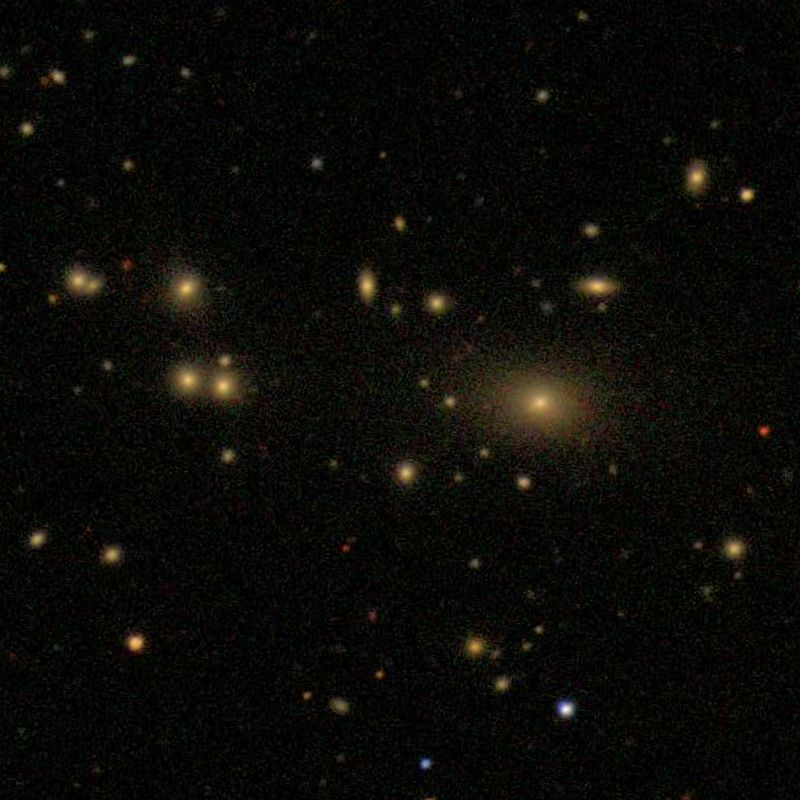
Abell 1366

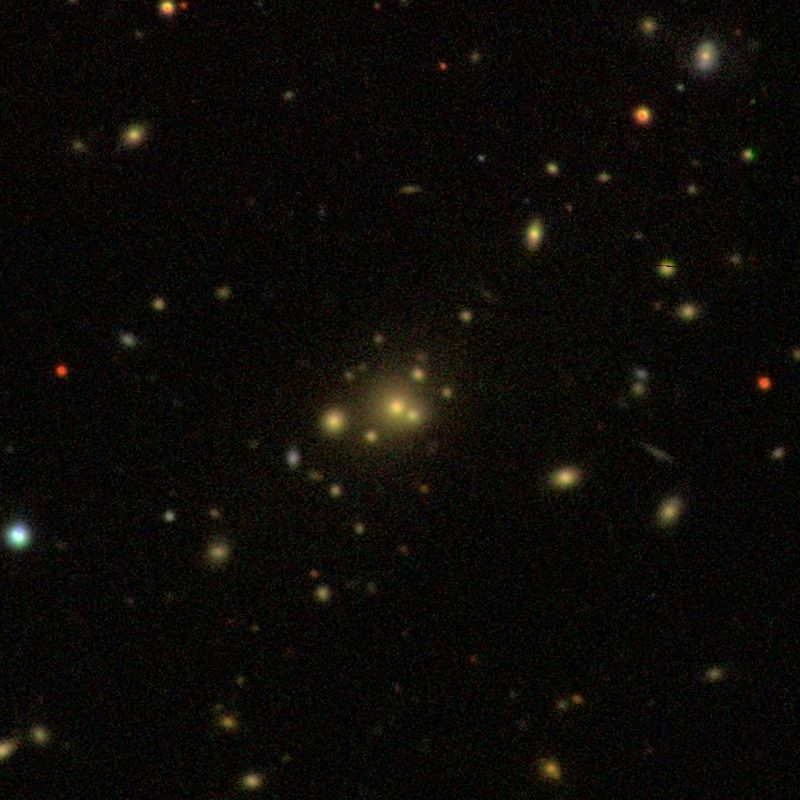
Abell 1446

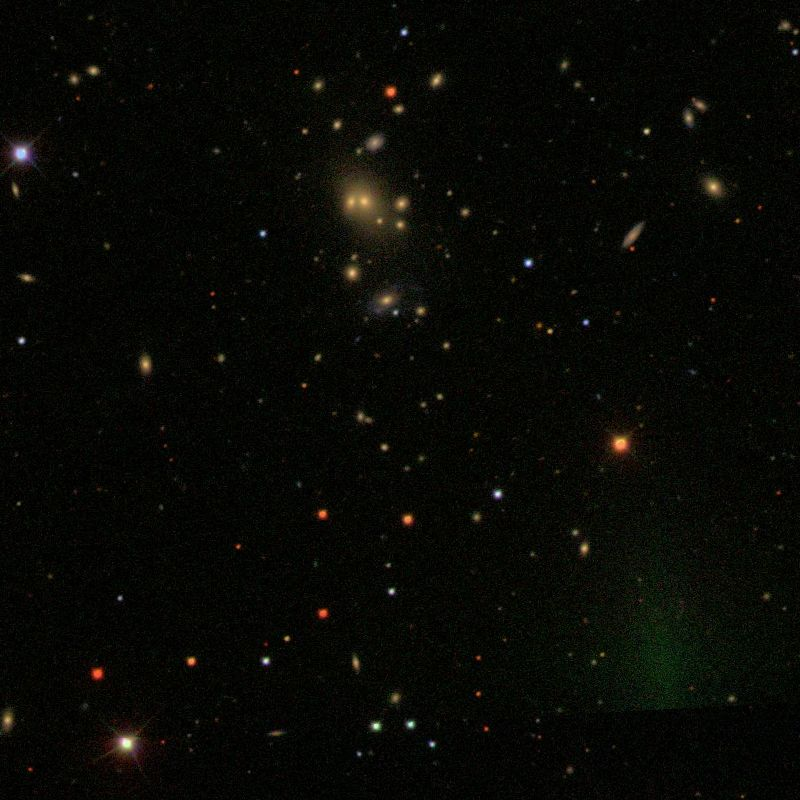
Abell 1559

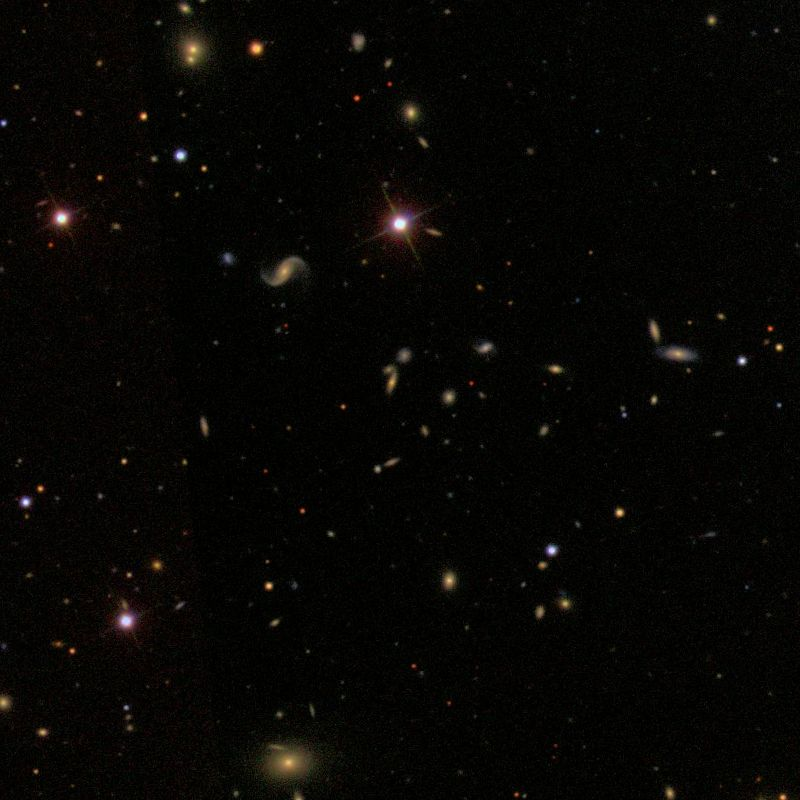
Abell 1621

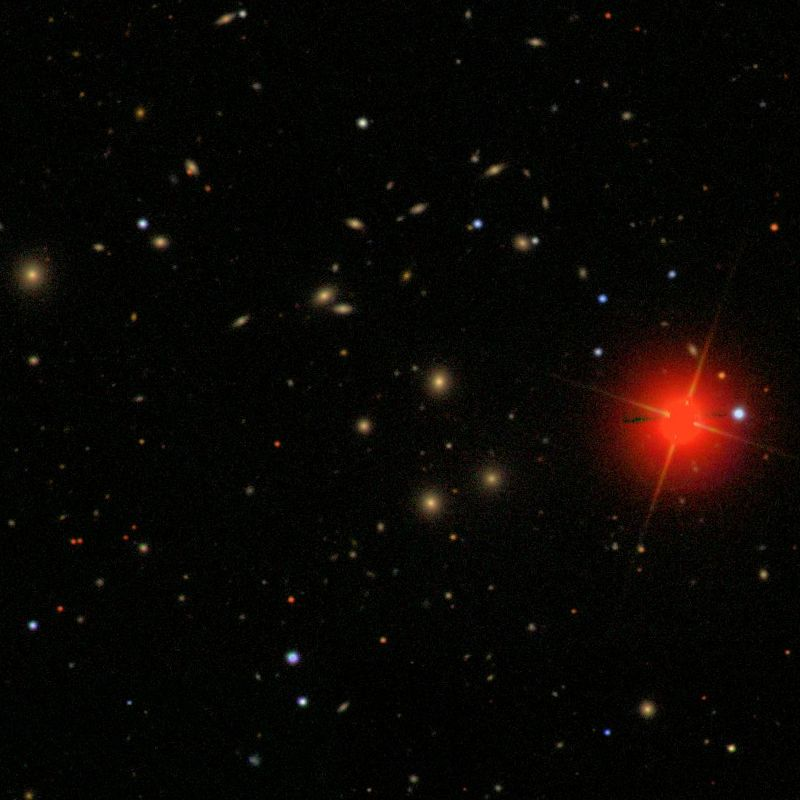
Abell 1566

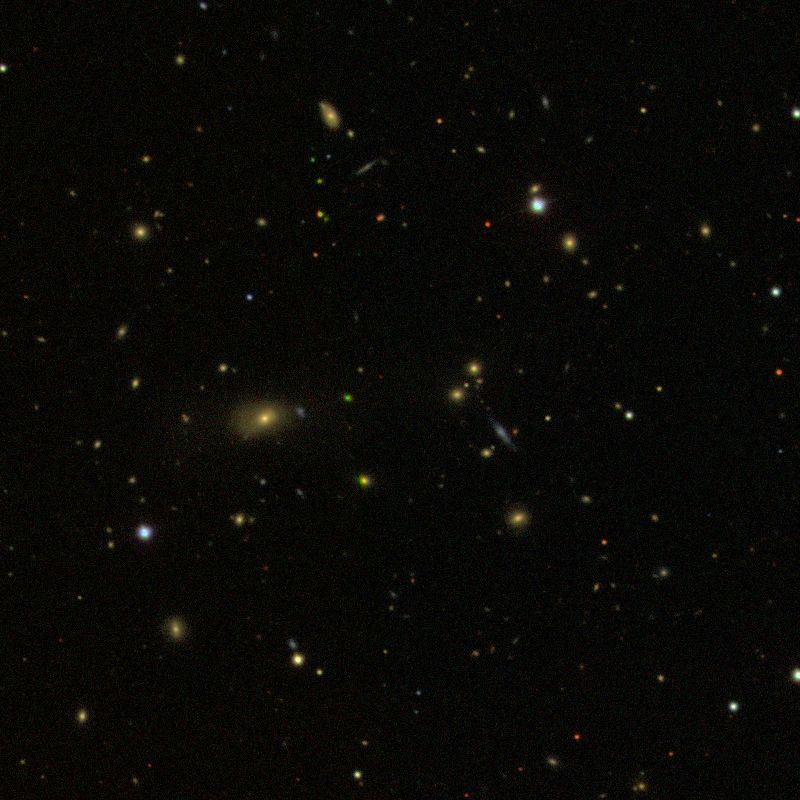
Abell 1646

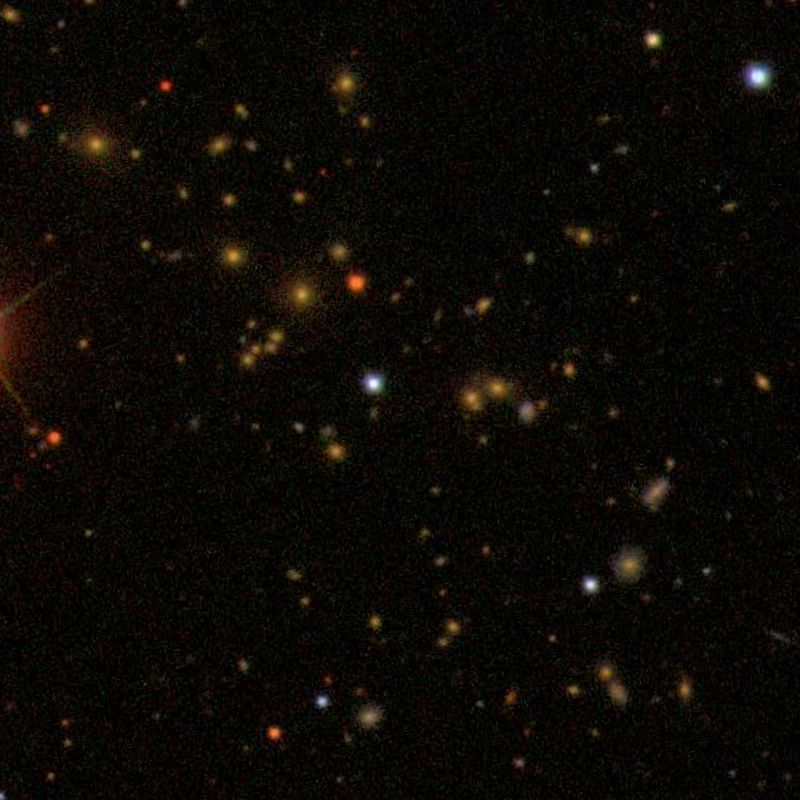
Abell 1674

== See also ==
- 3C 319
