= NGC 985 =

Ring galaxy in the constellation Cetus

- Hubble image of NGC 985

Observation data (J2000 epoch)
- Constellation: Cetus
- Right ascension: 02^{h} 34^{m} 37.8^{s}
- Declination: −08° 47′ 15″
- Redshift: 0.043143 ± 0.000073
- Heliocentric radial velocity: 12,934 ± 22 km/s
- Distance: 567 Mly (174 Mpc)
- Apparent magnitude (V): 13.5

Characteristics
- Type: Ring pec
- Apparent size (V): 1.0′ × 0.9′
- Notable features: Seyfert galaxy

Other designations
- VV 285, Mrk 1048, MCG -02-07-035, PGC 9817

NGC 985 is a ring galaxy in the constellation of Cetus. It is located about 550 million light years away from Earth, which means, given its apparent dimensions, that NGC 985 is approximately 160,000 light years across. It was discovered by Francis Leavenworth in 1886. It is a type 1 Seyfert galaxy.

NGC 985 is characterised by its ring shape. It is believed it was formed as a result of a galaxy merger. Further evidence supporting this theory is the observation of a second nucleus in NGC 985. When observed in infrared light, a second nucleus was found 3.8 arcseconds northwest of the active nucleus. It is much redder than the rest of the galaxy, indicating the presence of old stars. It has been suggested that the collision between a disk galaxy with another galaxy caused the formation of the ring and displaced the nucleus of the galaxy, creating an empty ring. Based on the kinematics of the galaxy, the secondary nucleus belonged to the intruder galaxy, while the active nucleus is associated with the main stellar component.

As is common with merger remnants, NGC 985 has increased star formation rate, and as a result shines bright in the infrared. The total infrared luminosity of NGC 985 is 1.8×10^{11} L_{☉} and it is characterised as a luminous infrared galaxy. The total molecular gas mass of the galaxy is estimated to be 2×10^{10} M_{☉}. Very large molecular clouds exist near the nuclei. They may be clouds gathering around the nucleus in the process of forming a disk around the two nuclei or molecular clouds disrupted by an outflow from the nucleus of the galaxy.

NGC 985 is a powerful X-ray source, detected by ROSAT. It is a complex X-ray source, whose spectrum cannot be accounted for by a simple power law at 0.6 keV and suggests the presence of a warm absorber. The hard X-ray emission on the other hand is characterised by a simple power law. The X-ray flux, especially soft X-rays, diminished in NGC 985 in 2013. The variability of the X-ray and ultraviolet emission from the nucleus was observed using the XMM-Newton and Hubble Space Telescope respectively. These observations revealed the presence of outflowing wind from an accretion disk formed around a supermassive black hole that obstructed the nucleus in soft X-rays and UV. The nucleus is otherwise seen unobstructed.
