= Arp 102 =

Pair of interacting galaxies

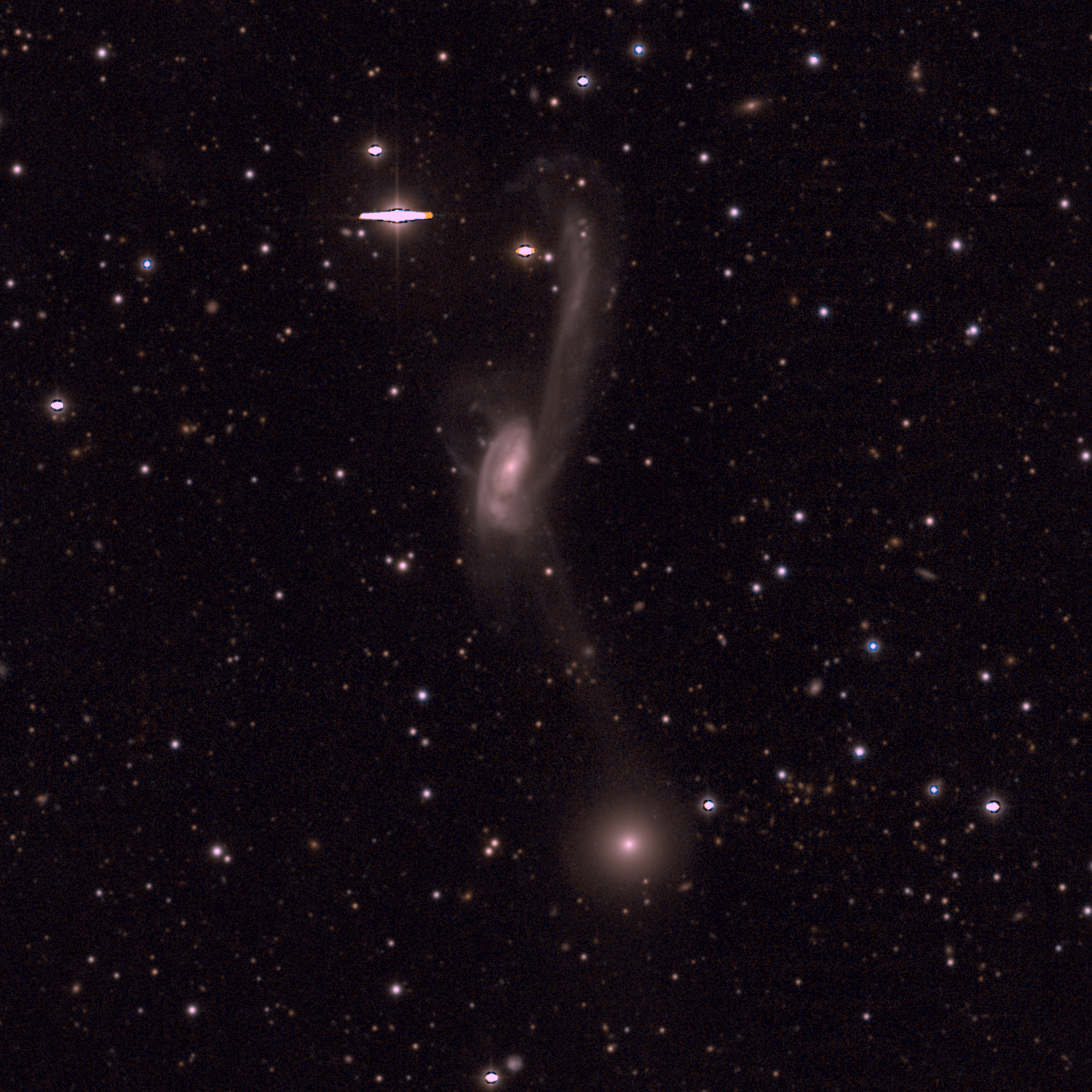
- Arp 102A near bottom, Arp 102B near center

Observation data
- Constellation: Hercules
- Right ascension: 17^{h} 19^{m} 17^{s}
- Declination: +49° 00′ 37″
- Redshift: 0.024
- Heliocentric radial velocity: (7217 ± 34) km/s
- Distance: 0 ± 0 Mly (000 ± 00 Mpc)
- Apparent magnitude (B): 15.2

Other designations
- Arp 102, UGC 10814, PGC 60067/70/73, CGCG 252-041, VV10a/b

Arp 102 is a pair of interacting galaxies. The two galaxies are designated as Arp 102A and Arp 102B. They were discovered by Halton Arp in 1966.

Arp 102A is a small elliptical galaxy. It is classified at an E0. Arp 102B is an active Seyfert galaxy. It is a spiral galaxy classified as SABb that contains two arms, one of which has been extremely elongated.
