= AM 0644−741 =

Ring galaxy in the constellation of Volans

AM 0644–741
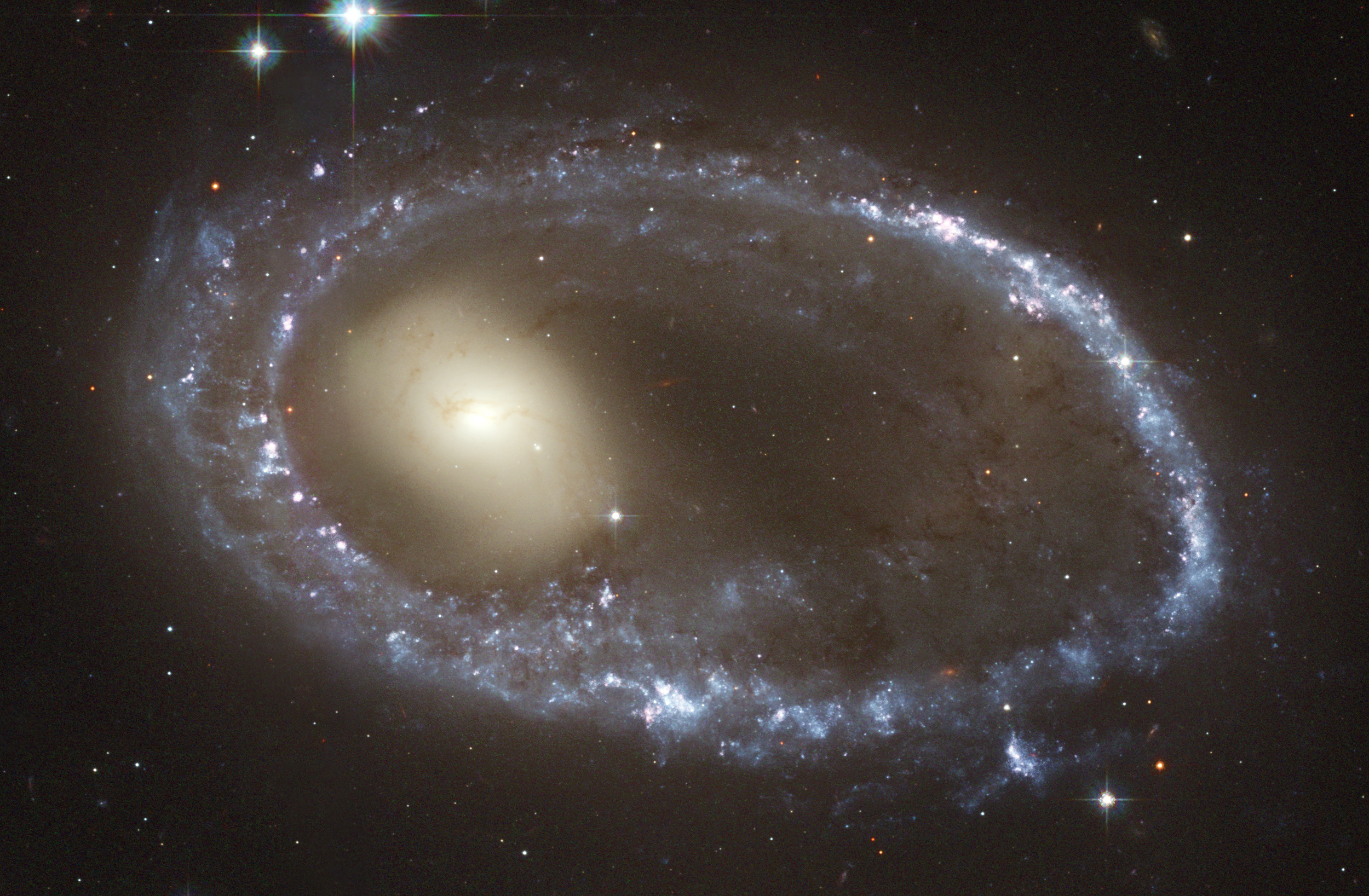
- AM 0644–741, as taken by the HST. The galaxy that pierced through the ring galaxy is out of the image

Observation data (J2000 epoch)
- Constellation: Volans
- Right ascension: 06^{h} 43^{m} 6.1^{s}
- Declination: −74° 13′ 35″
- Redshift: 6604 ± 26 km/s
- Distance: 300 Mly
- Apparent magnitude (V): 13.96

Characteristics
- Type: (S0-) + Ring
- Apparent size (V): 1.7′

Other designations
- Southern Ellipse, PGC 19481, AM 0644–741, ESO 34-11, VV 785, IRAS 06443–7411, SGC 064425–7411.1

AM 0644–741, also known as the Lindsay-Shapley Ring, is an unbarred lenticular galaxy, and a ring galaxy, which is 300 million light-years away in the southern constellation Volans.

== Properties ==
=== Formation ===
The yellowish nucleus was once the center of a normal spiral galaxy, and the ring which currently surrounds the center is 150,000 light years in diameter. The ring is theorized to have formed by a collision with another galaxy, which triggered a gravitational disruption that caused dust in the galaxy to condense and form stars, which forced it to then expand away from the galaxy and create a ring.

=== Physical characteristics ===
The ring's intense blue hue is the result of widespread formation of massive, young, blue stars. The pink regions along the ring are another sign of rampant star formation. They are rarefied clouds of glowing hydrogen gas, fluorescing as a result of the young blue stars' intense ultraviolet light.

=== Future of the ring ===
Galactic simulation models suggest that the ring of AM 0644–741 will continue to expand for about another 300 million years, after which it will begin to disintegrate.

== See also ==
- Arp-Madore 417-391
- ESO 69-6
- PGC 6240
- Hoag's Object
