= Vela ring galaxy =

Ring galaxy

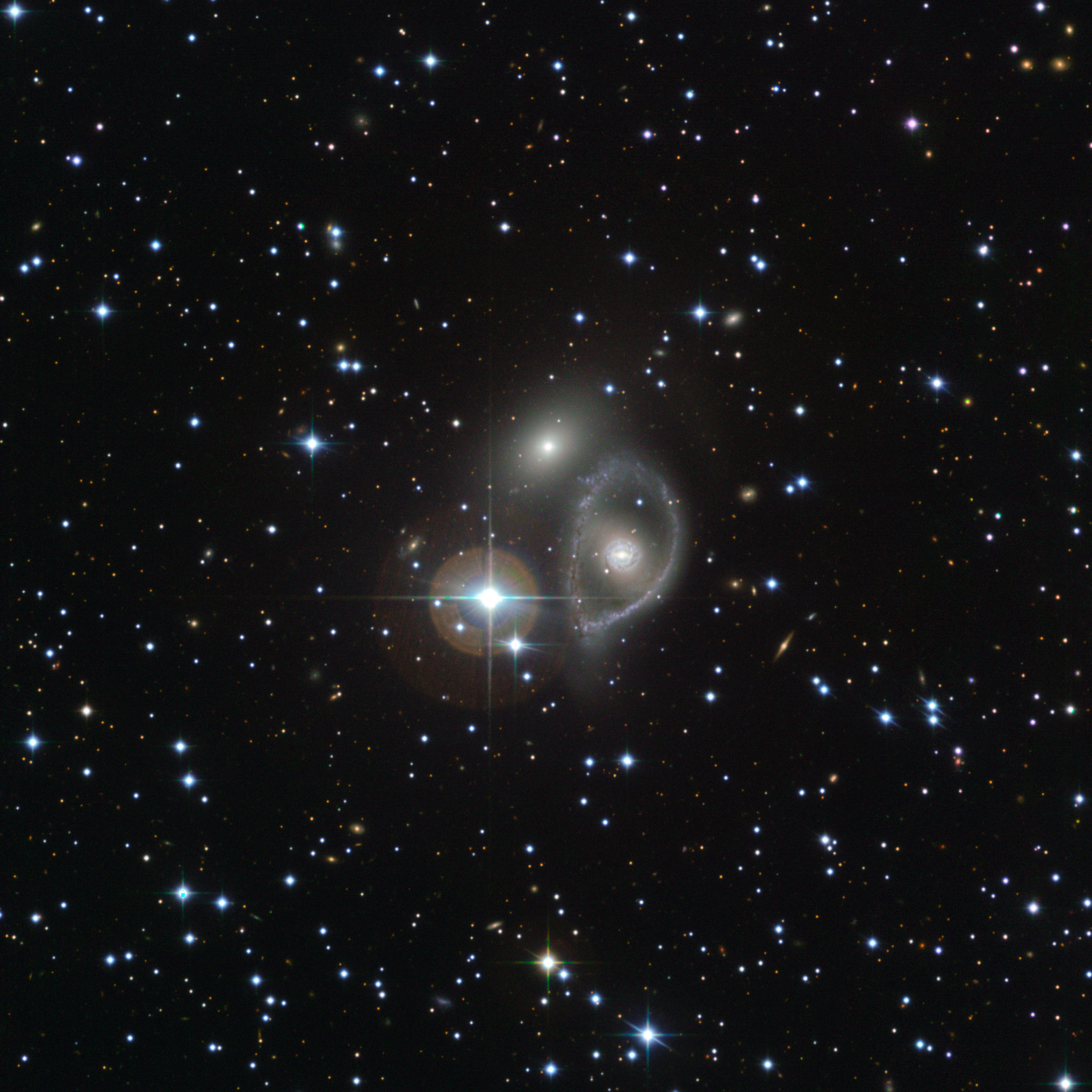
- Image of the galaxy, the bright star like object is a star named HD 88170

Observation data
- Constellation: Antlia

Characteristics
- Type: Ring galaxy

Other designations
- ESO 316-32, PGC 29529

The Vela ring galaxy is a ring galaxy in the constellation of Antlia. The galaxy has a bright core region that is surrounded by a blue ring which is filled with gas and stars.
