= PGC 39058 =

Dwarf Galaxy in the constellation Draco

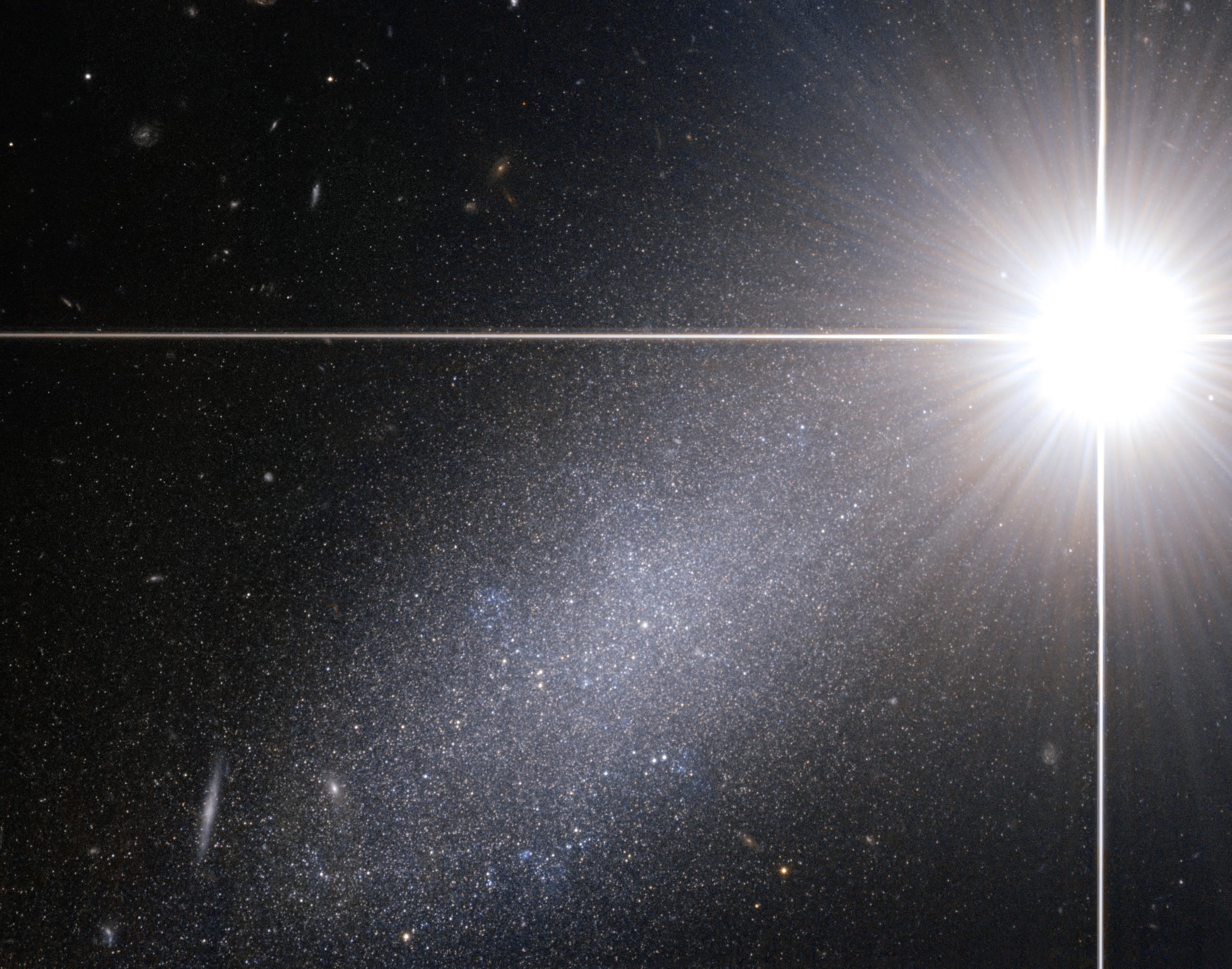
- PGC 39058 imaged by the Hubble Space Telescope

Observation data (J2000 epoch)
- Constellation: Draco
- Right ascension: 12^{h} 14^{m} 08.4^{s}
- Declination: +66° 05′ 41″
- Redshift: 0.000227
- Heliocentric radial velocity: 68
- Distance: 17.710 ± 0.055 Mly (5.430 ± 0.017 Mpc)
- Apparent magnitude (V): 14.6

Characteristics
- Type: Scd
- Apparent size (V): 1.95' x 0.8385'

Other designations
- UGC 7242, PGC 39058, MCG+11-15-037

PGC 39058 is a dwarf galaxy located 17.7 million light-years away in the constellation Draco. The galaxy is faint and obscured by HD 106381, a star in the foreground making it difficult to observe.
