= Catalogue of Galaxies and of Clusters of Galaxies =

Astronomical catalog

The Catalogue of Galaxies and of Clusters of Galaxies (or CGCG), also known as the Zwicky Catalogue, was compiled by Fritz Zwicky in 1961–68. It contains 29,418 galaxies and 9,134 galaxy clusters.

== Gallery ==
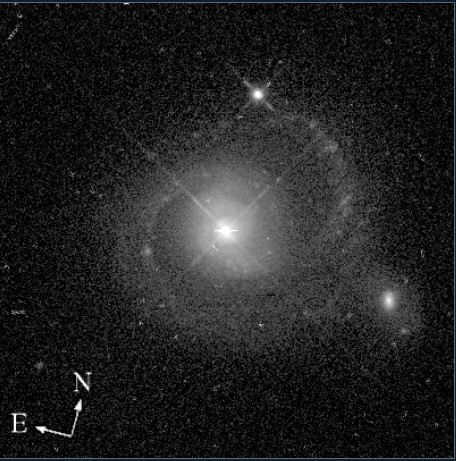
I Zwicky 1

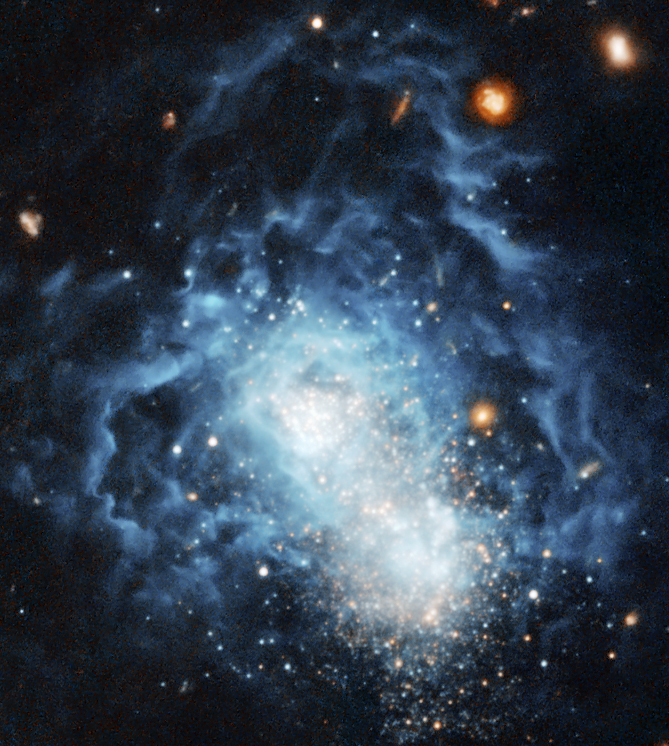
I Zwicky 18

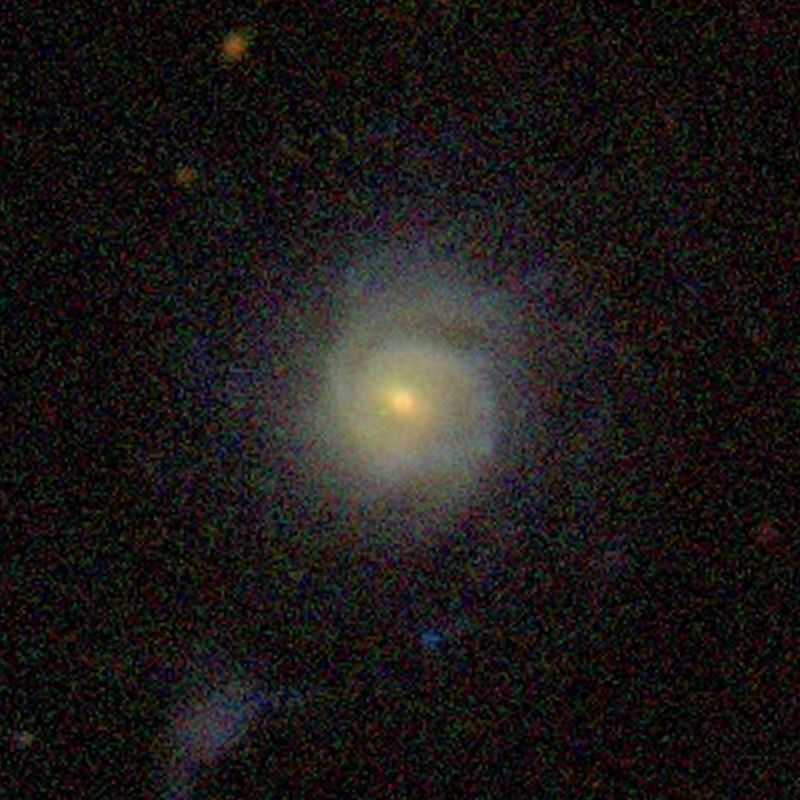
I Zwicky 32, a face-on spiral galaxy in the constellation of Canes Venatici

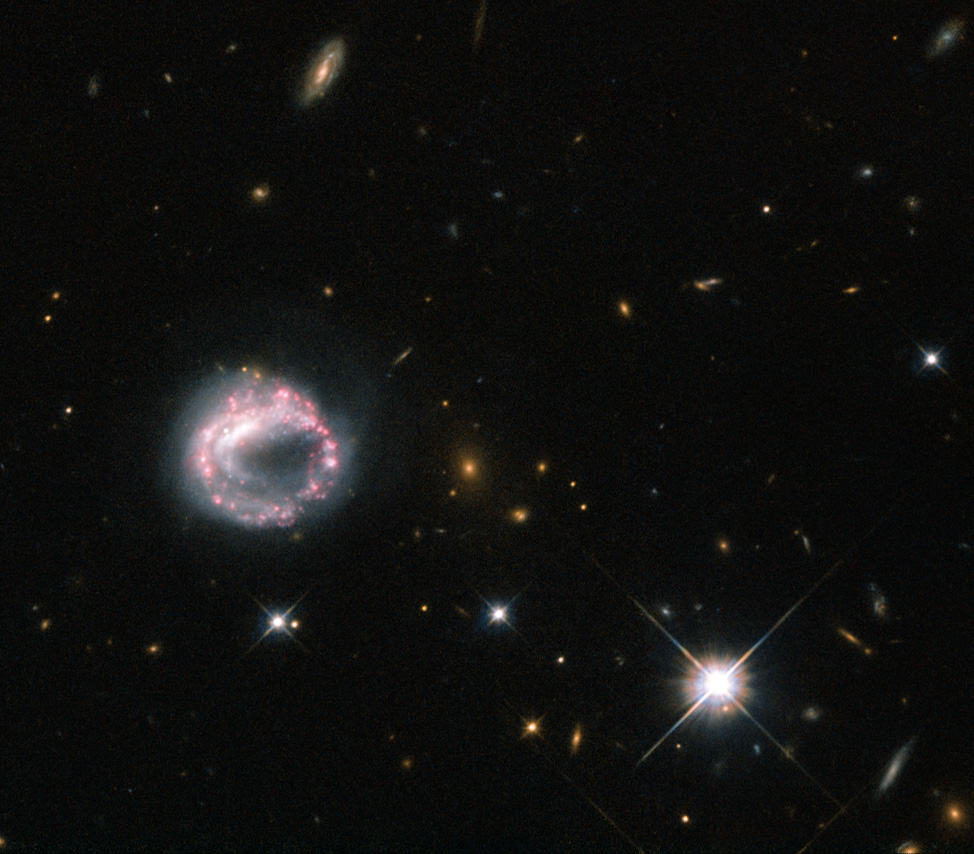
Ring galaxy II Zwicky 28

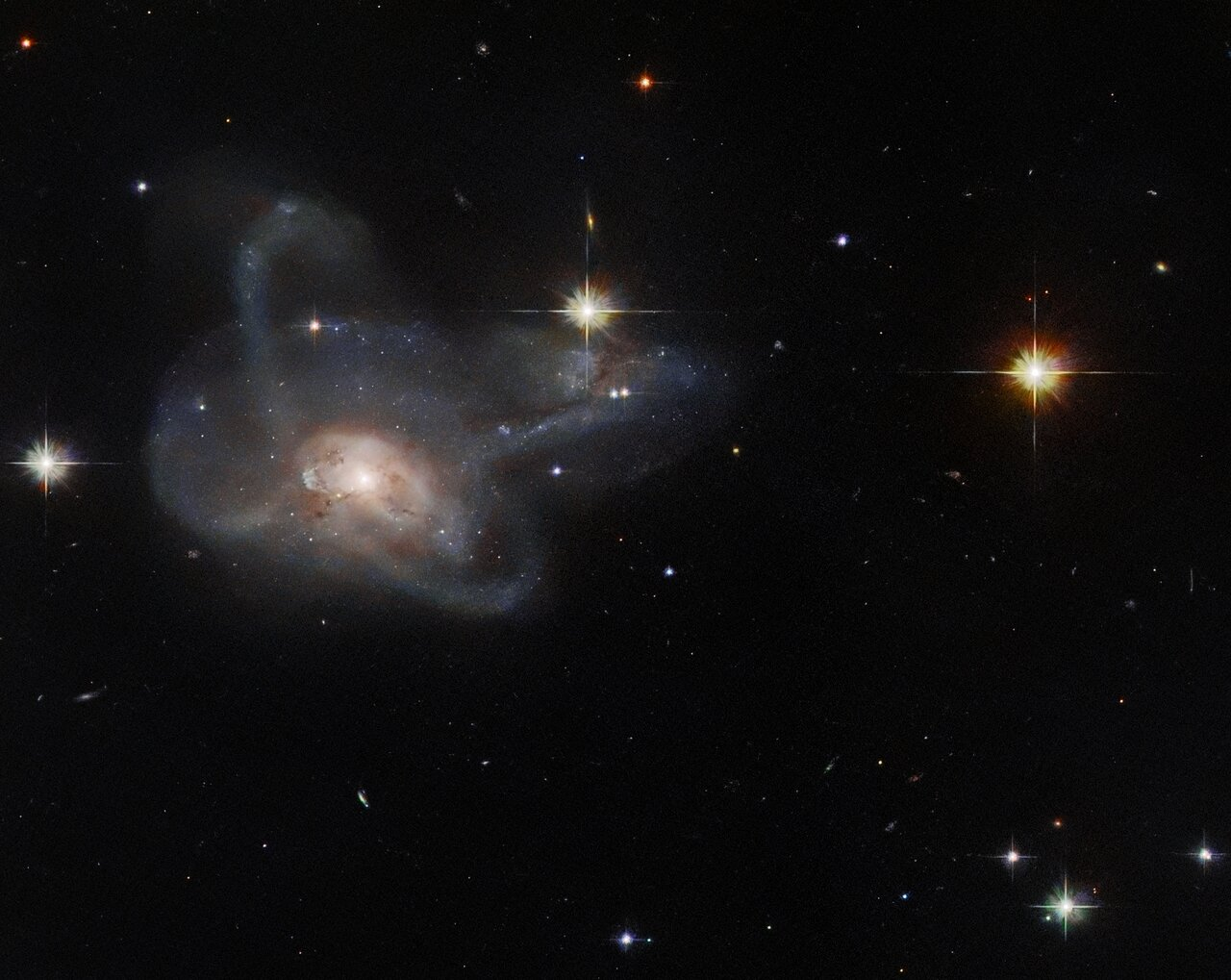
CGCG 396-002

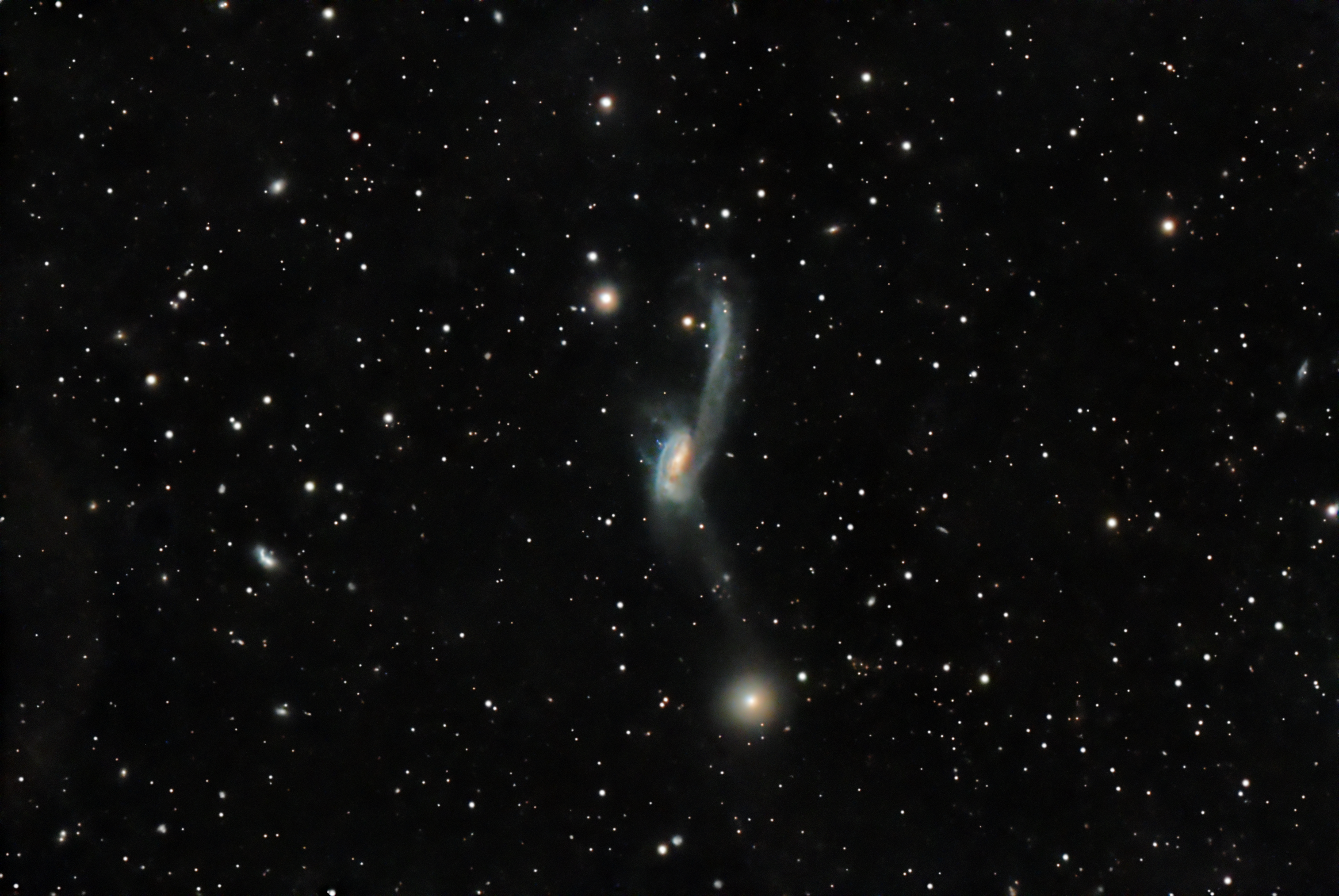
Arp 102, Zwicky Connected Galaxies

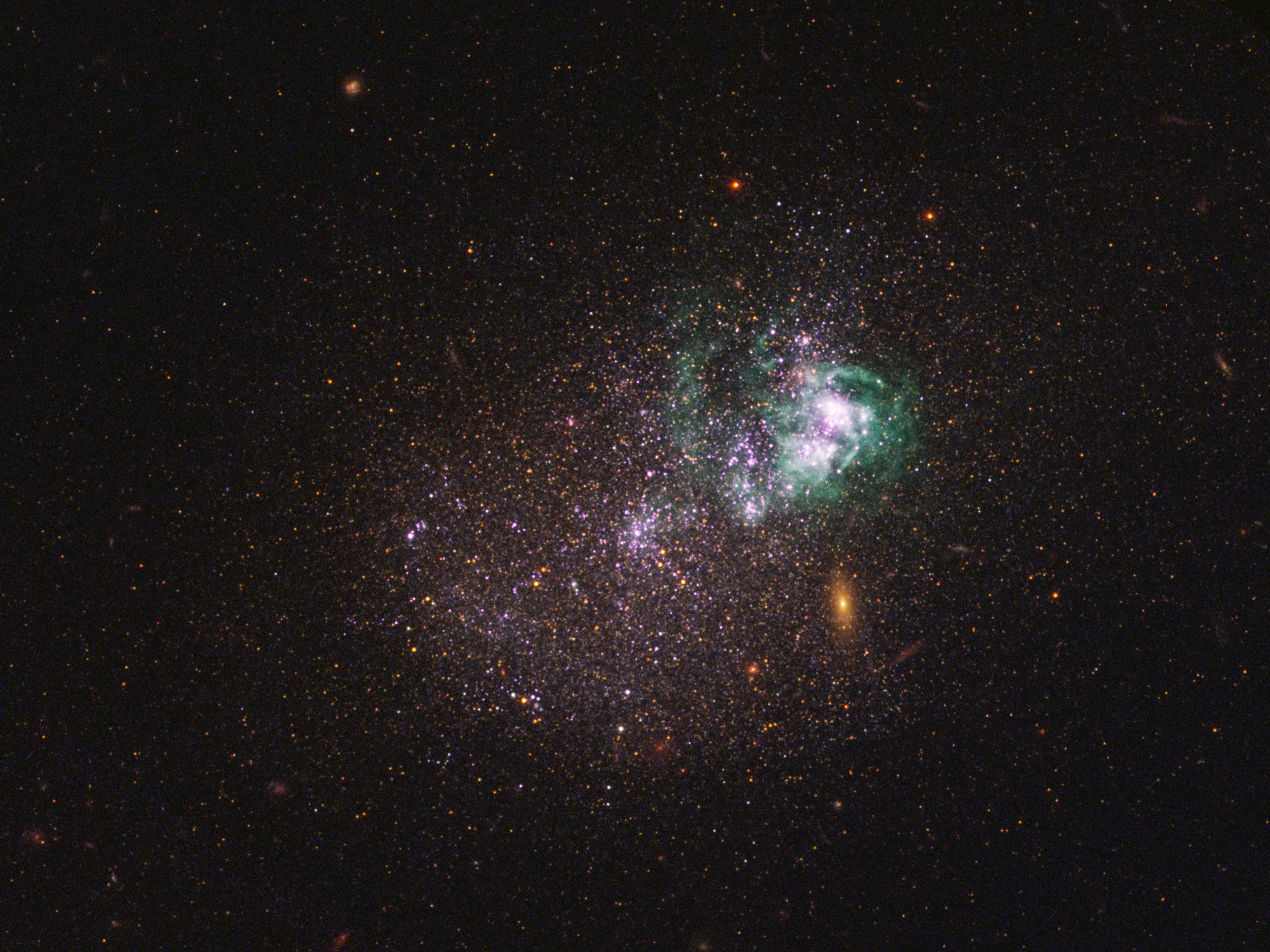
I Zwicky 36
