= II Zwicky 28 =

Galaxy

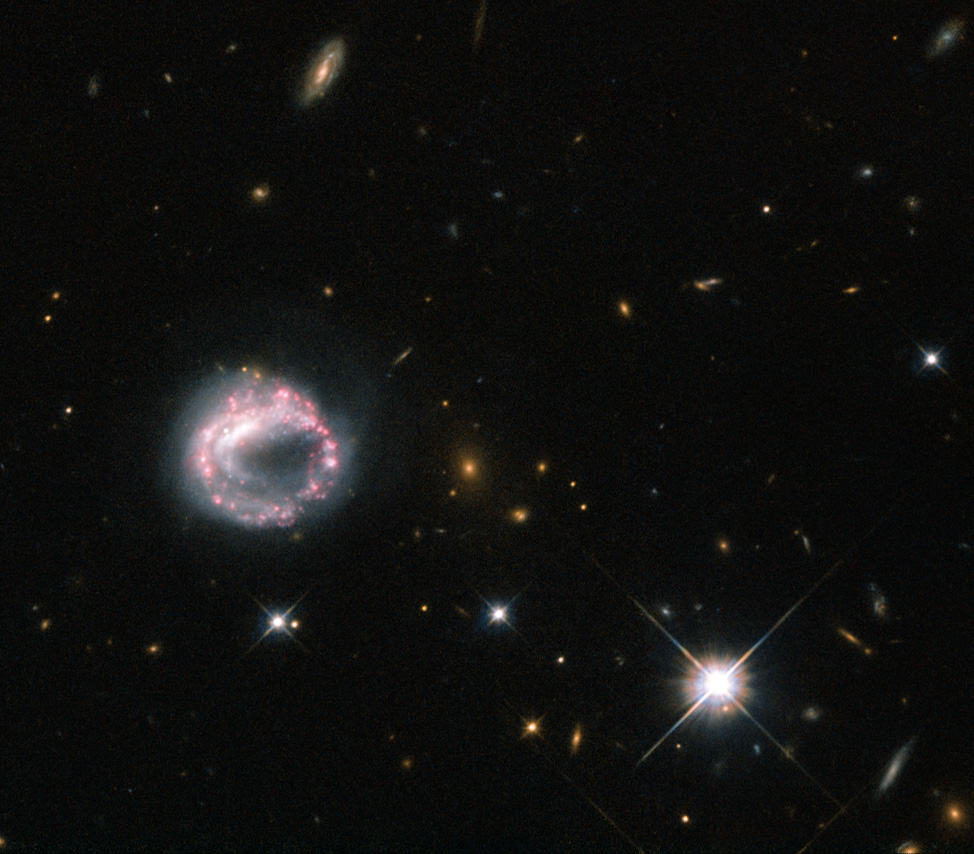
- Ring galaxy II Zwicky 28 imaged by the Hubble Space Telescope

Observation data (J2000 epoch)
- Constellation: Orion
- Right ascension: 05^{h} 01^{m} 42.0^{s}
- Declination: +03° 34′ 28″
- Redshift: 0.028630 +/- 0.000060
- Heliocentric radial velocity: 8583 +/-18 km/s
- Distance: 390 Mly (120 mpc)
- Apparent magnitude (V): 15.5

Characteristics
- Type: S pec (Ring)
- Apparent size (V): 0.3' x 0.3'

Other designations
- VV 790b, 2MASX J05014205+0334278, PGC 016572

II Zwicky 28 is an interacting ring galaxy at a distance of approximately 390 million light-years. The sparkling pink and purple loop in Zw II 28 is not a typical ring galaxy because it does not seem to have the usual visible central companion. For many years it was thought to be a lone circle on the sky, but observations using the Hubble Space Telescope have shown that there may be a possible companion lurking just inside the ring, where the loop appears to double back on itself.

The galaxy is only a faint IRAS source, which may indicate a lower level of star formation than other rings, however it has a high Hα luminosity, similar to other ring galaxies. It displays strong Balmer absorption lines interior to the ring, and it is possible that a major burst of star formation has recently occurred, using up a large fraction of the galaxy's molecular reservoir, and depleting its dust content.

The bright foreground star is not associated to Zwicky; it is in our own galaxy, about 1,585 light-years away from the sun.
