= 3C 319 =

Galaxy in the constellation Draco

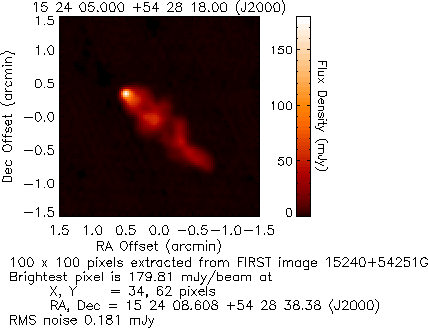

Observation data (Epoch J2000)
- Constellation: Draco
- Right ascension: 15^{h} 24^{m} 05.6^{s}
- Declination: +54° 28′ 18.4″
- Redshift: 0.192
- Distance: 757 megaparsecs (2,470 Mly) h^{−1}_{0.73}
- Type: rG, Rad, QSO, AGN; G, FR II
- Apparent magnitude (V): 18.5 (B)

Other designations
- DA 383, LEDA 2817605, 3C 319, 4C 54.34

3C 319 is a radio galaxy located in the constellation Draco.
