= ESO 69-6 =

Pair of interacting galaxies in the constellation Triangulum Australe

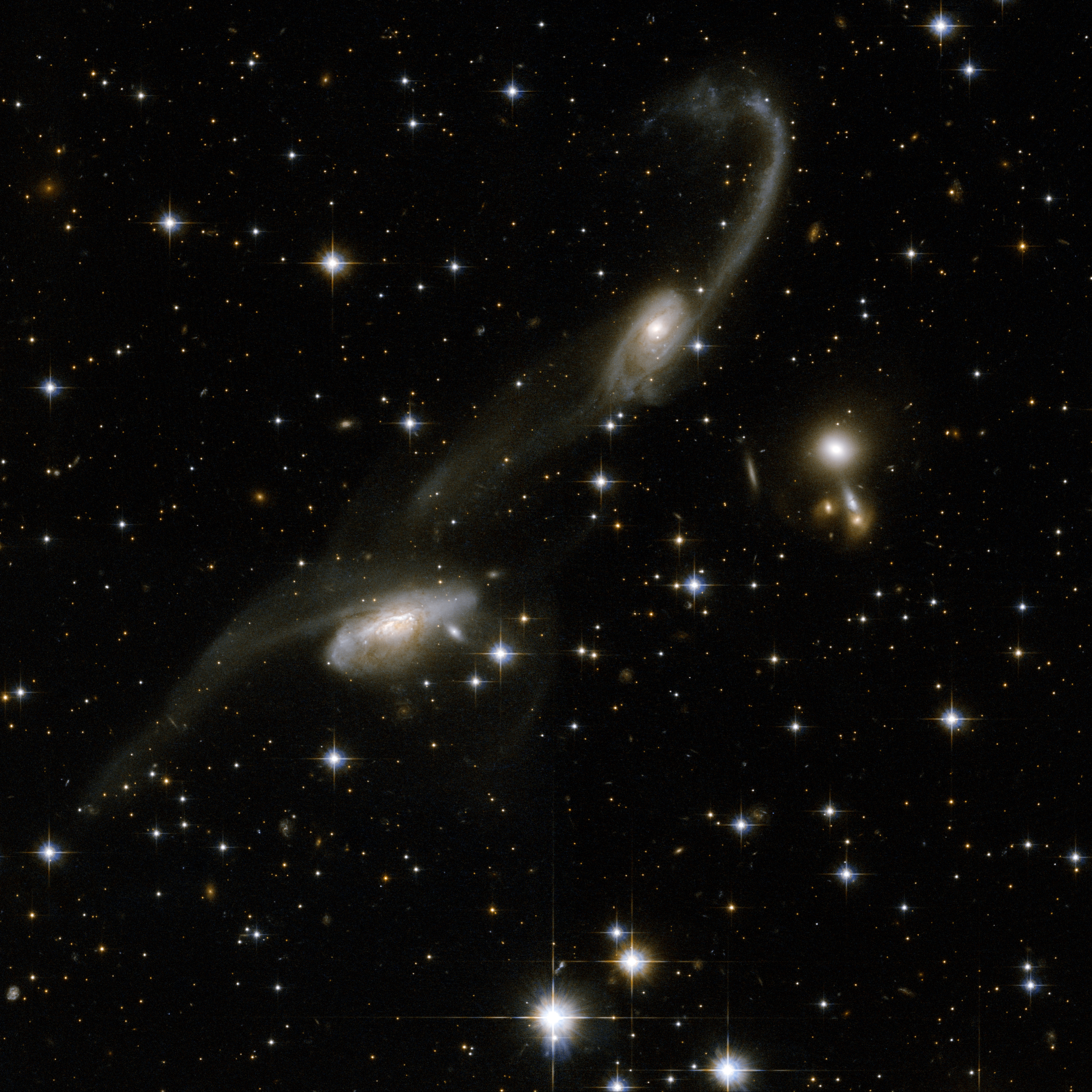
- Hubble Space Telescope image of ESO 69-6

Observation data (J2000 epoch)
- Constellation: Triangulum Australe
- Right ascension: 16^{h} 38^{m} 13.1^{s}
- Declination: −68° 26′ 42.8″
- Redshift: 0.046439
- Heliocentric radial velocity: 14,082 km/s
- Distance: 654 Mly (200.6 Mpc)
- Apparent magnitude (V): 16.16

Characteristics
- Type: LIRG
- Notable features: Interacting galaxies

Other designations
- ESO 069-IG 006, PGC 58663, AM 1633-682, 2MASX J16381190-6826080, IRAS 16330-6820, 2MASS J16381342-6827167, CXO J163813.4-682717

ESO 69-6 collectively known as AM 1633-682, is a pair of interacting galaxies located 654 million light-years away in the constellation of Triangulum Australe. They are made of two galaxies: ESO 069-IG 006N known as IRAS 16330-6820, and ESO 069-IG 006S known as LEDA 285730.

== Characteristics ==
Both galaxies are in stages of merging with each other. They resemble musical notes on a stave. Long tidal tails are formed, which stars and gas are stripped and torn away from their outer regions. These tails are proven signs of their interactions. Additionally numerical simulations that reproduces interaction-induced inflow of gas and resulting nuclear starbursts can, might trigger strong starbursts in both galaxies.

It is proven from the gravitational interactions of ESO 69-6, the surrounding intergalactic medium can be enriched with metals very efficiently up to distances of several 100 kpc. This can be explained in terms of indirect processes or direct processes that create kinetic spreading of baryonic matter. Possibly, they will eventually merge with each other and form a much bigger galaxy, in this case an elliptical galaxy, in the future.
