= Ring galaxy =

Galaxy with an annular appearance

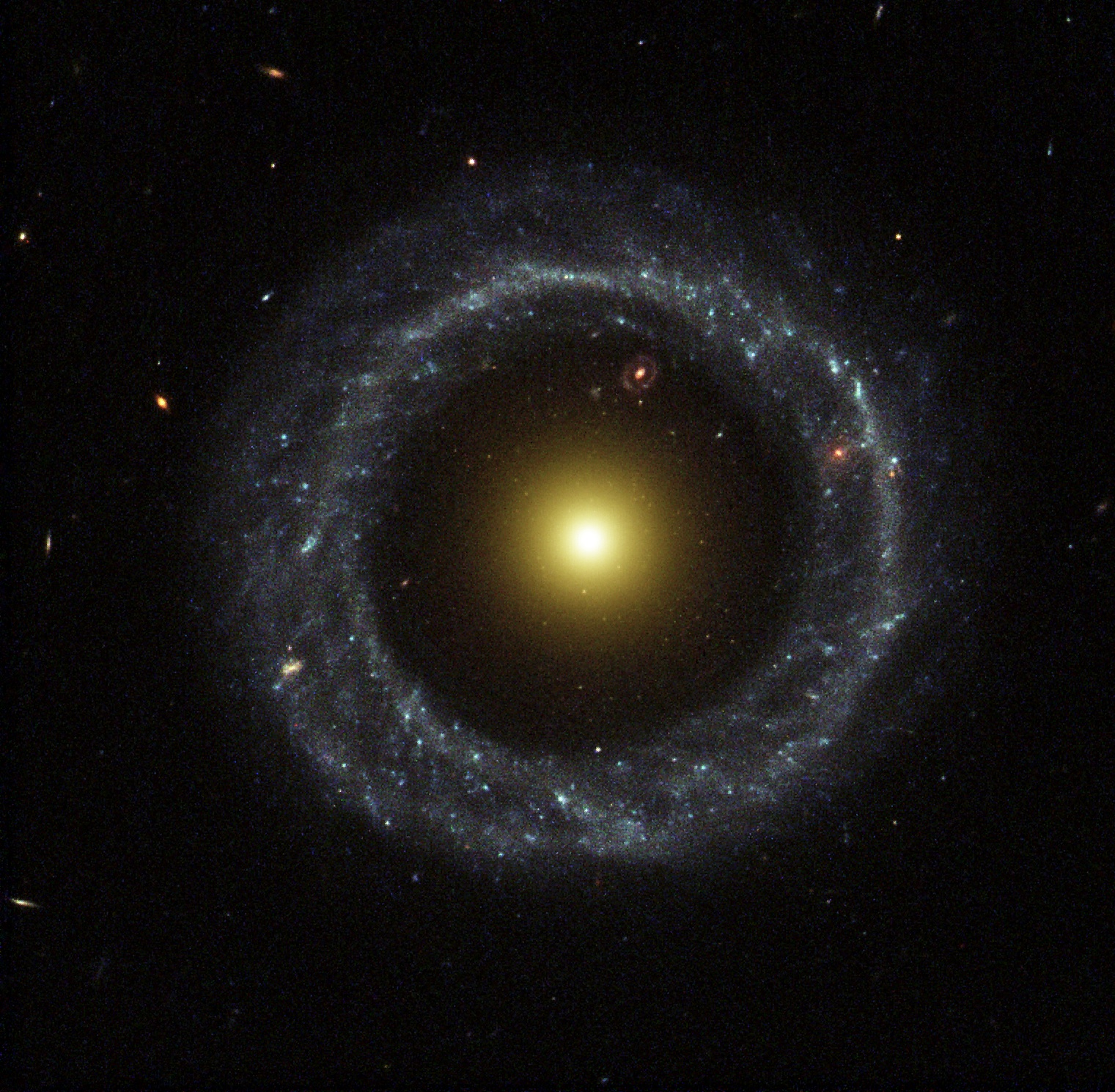
Hoag's Object, a ring galaxy. Another red ring galaxy can be seen behind it.

A ring galaxy is a type of galaxy that includes a large annular structure. The galactic center may be relatively separate from the ring structure, or present a continuous disc shape. Hoag's Object, discovered by Arthur Hoag in 1950, is an example of a ring galaxy. The ring contains many massive, relatively young blue stars, which are extremely bright. The central region contains relatively little luminous matter. Some astronomers believe that ring galaxies are formed when a smaller galaxy passes through the center of a larger galaxy. Because most of a galaxy consists of empty space, this "collision" rarely results in any actual collisions between stars. However, the gravitational disruptions caused by such an event could cause a wave of star formation to move through the larger galaxy. Other astronomers think that rings are formed around some galaxies when external accretion takes place. Star formation would then take place in the accreted material because of the shocks and compressions of the accreted material.

== Formation theories ==
All of the processes that form ring galaxies appear to cause significant effects on stellar populations. From observations of the spectrum of the ring structures, there appear to be very high star formation rates caused by the outwards pressure wave. The regions also have very high metallicities, supporting the idea of a significant amount of evolution of the stellar population within the ring. The methods ring galaxies are theorized to be formed through include, but are not limited to, the scenarios listed below:

=== Bar instability ===
A phenomenon where the rotational velocity of the bar in a barred spiral galaxy increases to the point of spiral spin-out. Under typical conditions, gravitational density waves would favor the creation of spiral arms. When the bar is unstable, these density waves are instead migrated out into a ring-structure by the pressure, force, and gravitational influence of the baryonic and dark matter furiously orbiting about the bar. This migration forces the stars, gas and dust found within the former arms into a torus-like region, forming a ring, and often igniting star formation.

Galaxies with this structure have been found where the bar dominates, and essentially "carves out" the ring of the disc as it rotates. Oppositely, ring galaxies have been found where the bar has collapsed or disintegrated into a highly-flattened bulge.

Other instabilities have been predicted due to asymmetries caused by spiral arms, which creates a net torque depending on the pattern of the bar. This torque creates a resonance instability that drives matter from the arms both outwards and inwards towards the core, creating the distinct ring and core structure.

Despite this, observations suggest that bars, rings and spiral arms have the ability to fall apart and reform over the span of hundreds of millions of years, particularly in dense intergalactic environments, such as galaxy groups and clusters, where gravitational influences are more likely to play a role in the morphological and physical evolution of a galaxy without the influence of collisions and mergers.

=== Galactic collisions ===
Another observed way that ring galaxies can form is through the process of two or more galaxies colliding. The Cartwheel Galaxy, galaxy pair AM 2026-424, and Arp 147 are all examples of ring galaxies thought to be formed by this process.

In pass-through galactic collisions, or bullseye collisions, an often smaller donor galaxy will pass directly through the disc of an often larger spiral, causing an outward push of the arms from the gravity of the smaller galaxy, as if dropping a rock into a pond of still water. These collisions can either launch the bulge and core away from the main disk, creating an almost empty ring appearance as the shockwave pushes the spiral arms out, or shove the core out towards the disk, often creating an oval-shaped ring with the bulge still somewhat intact. In side-swipe and head-on collisions, the appearance of a perfect ring are less likely, with chaotic and warped appearances dominating. In these collisional galaxy systems, the individual galaxies that made up the ring system are often still observable.

Rings formed through collision processes are believed to be transient features of the affected galaxies, lasting only a few ten to hundred million years (a relatively short timeframe considering some mergers can take over a billion years to complete) before disintegrating, reforming into spiral arms, or succumbing to further disturbance from gravitational influence.

=== Ring accretion ===
==== Intergalactic medium accretion ====
This method has been inferred through the existence of Hoag's object, along with UV observations of several other large and ultra-large super spiral galaxies and current formation theories of spiral galaxies.

UV-light observations show several cases of faint, ring-like and spiral structures of hot young stars that have formed along the network of cooled inflowing gas, extending far from the visible luminous galactic disc. If conditions are favorable, a ring can form in the place of a spiral structure. Polar-ring galaxies may form through cold accretion, as gas from the galaxy filament flows into the disk and halo regions of a galaxy early in evolution. Resulting star formation interferes with the formation of spiral structures in the stellar disk, and a stable ring structure is created. Similarly, pre-existing elliptical galaxies may also experience cold accretion and result in polar-ring galaxies.

Since some spiral galaxies are theorized to have formed from massive clouds of intergalactic gas collapsing and then rotationally forming into a disc structure, one could assume that a ring disc could form in place of a spiral disc if, as mentioned before, conditions are favorable. This holds true for protogalaxies, or galaxies just throughout to be forming, and old galaxies that have migrated into a section of space with a higher gas content than its previous locations.

==== Tidal accretion ====
Besides intergalactic medium accretion, tidal interactions between a host galaxy and a gas-rich donor galaxy in a polar orbit may lead to the formation of polar-ring galaxies. Simulations indicate that rings formed through accretion have a greater inclination angle, compared to rings formed through merging galaxies, as some angular momentum from the gas of the donor galaxy is lost through dispersion; consequentially, the inclination angle is allowed to deviate from the donor. The accretion model is particularly insightful for galaxies with rings that intersect with the central portion's poles, as opposed to lying along the same orbital plane.

== Gallery ==
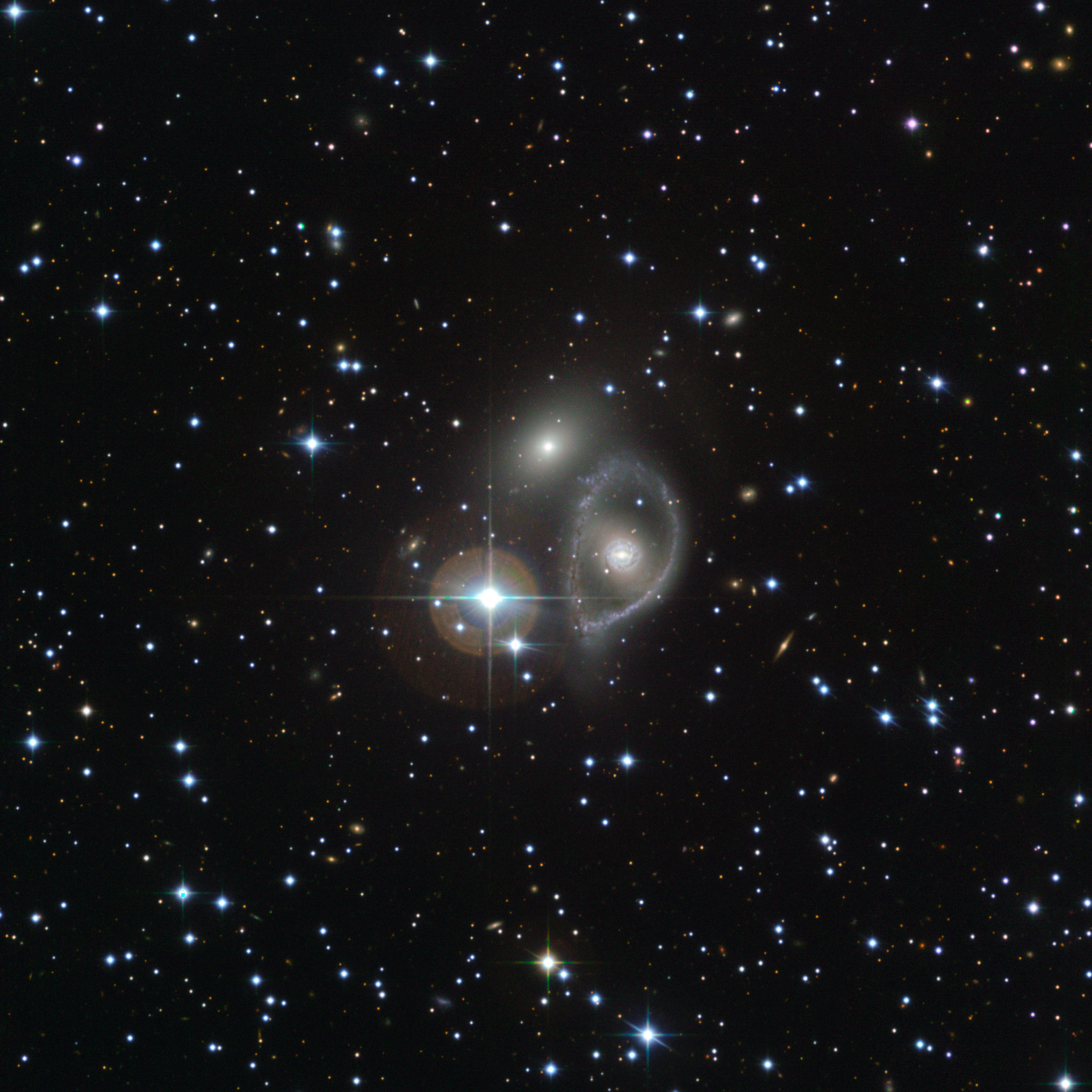
Vela ring galaxy, and a bright star known as HD 88170.

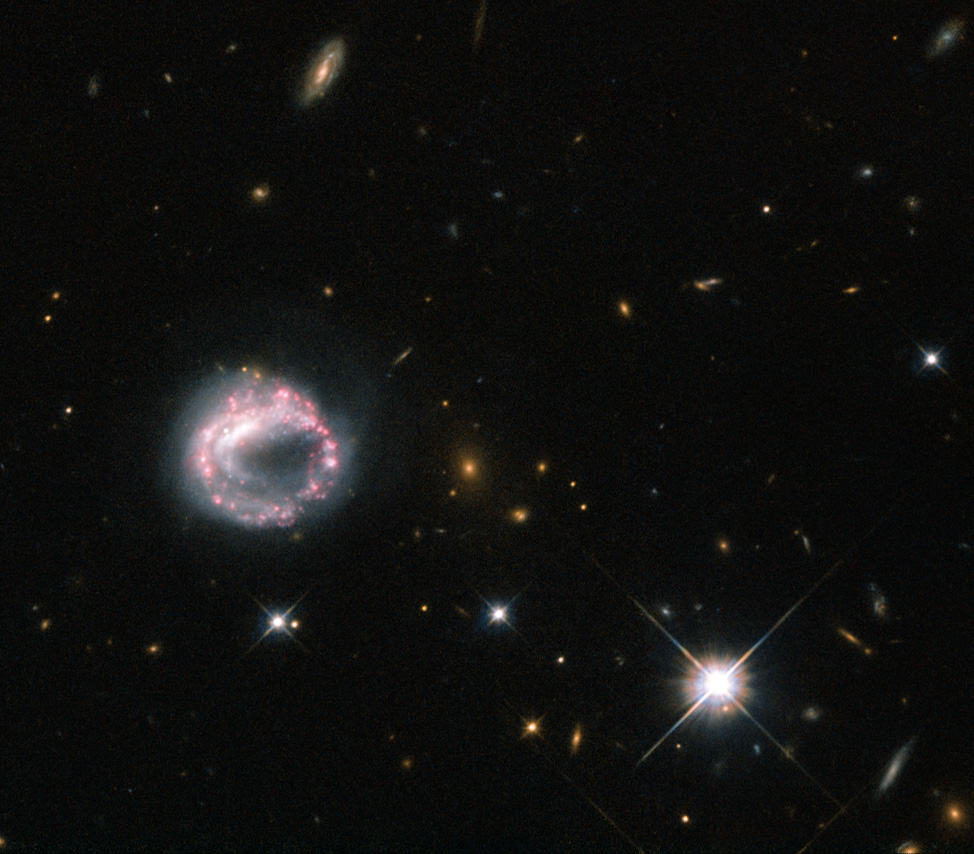
Ring Galaxy - II Zwicky 28

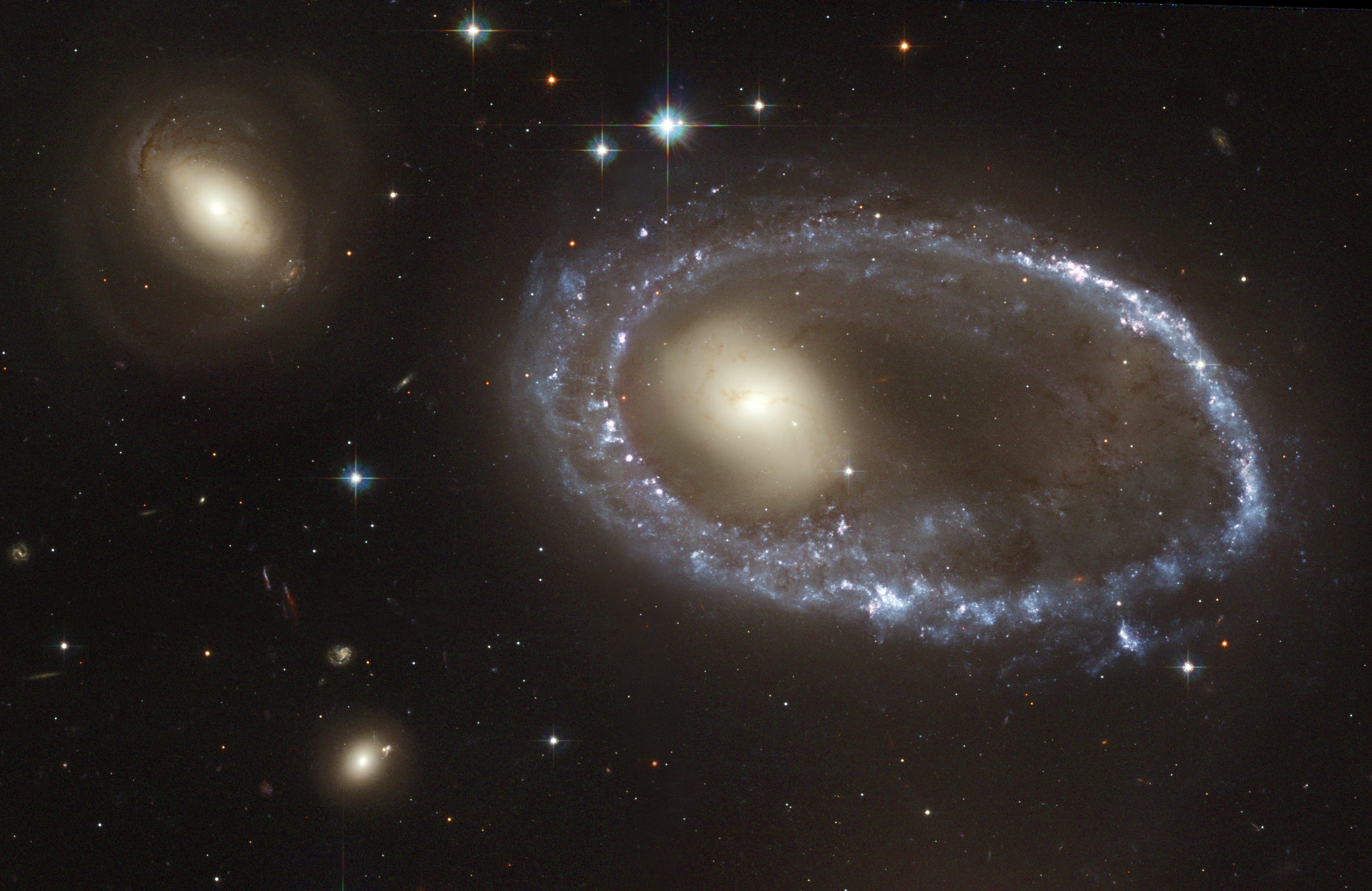
Image of AM 0644-741 by the Hubble Space Telescope

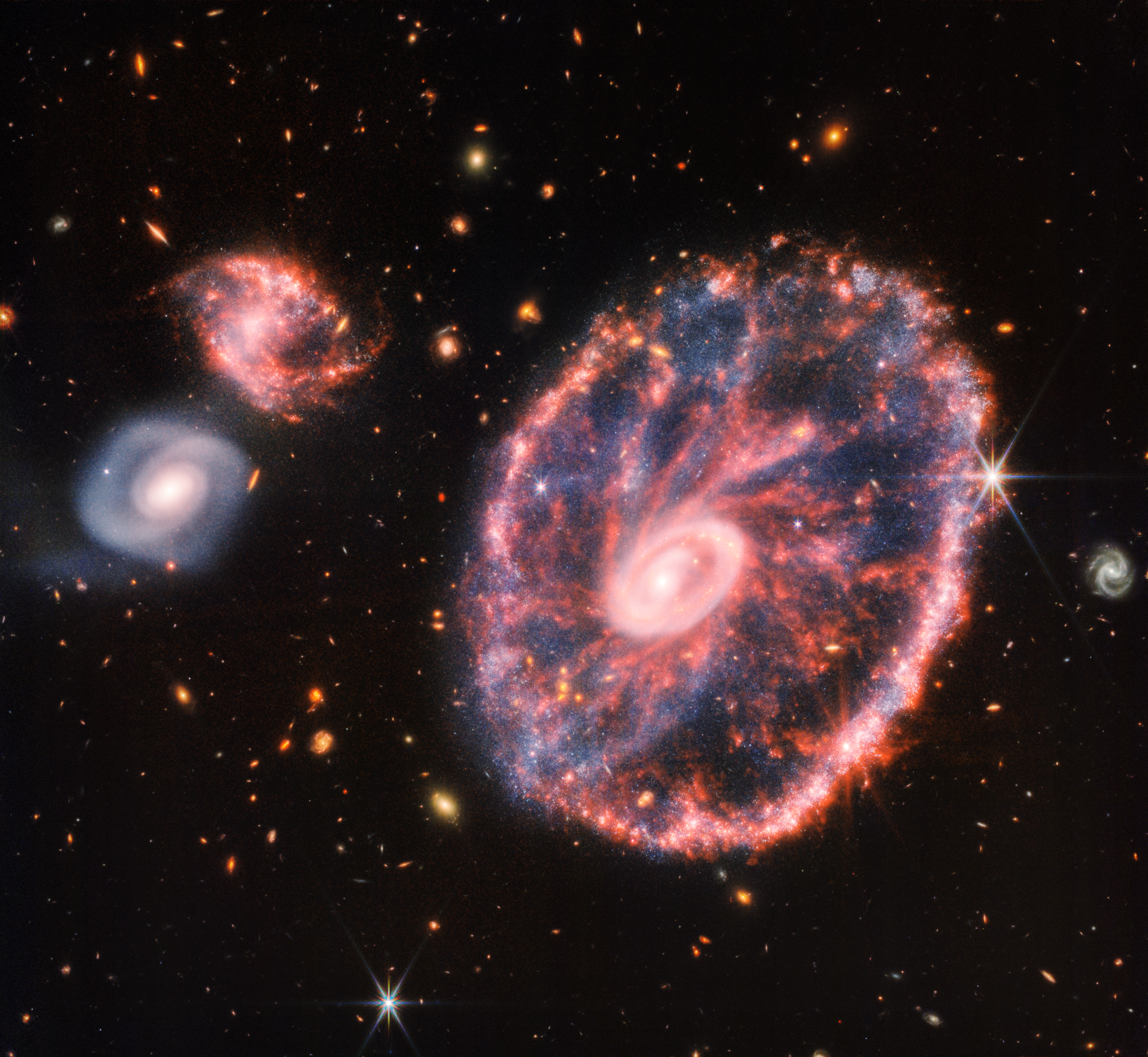
The Cartwheel Galaxy

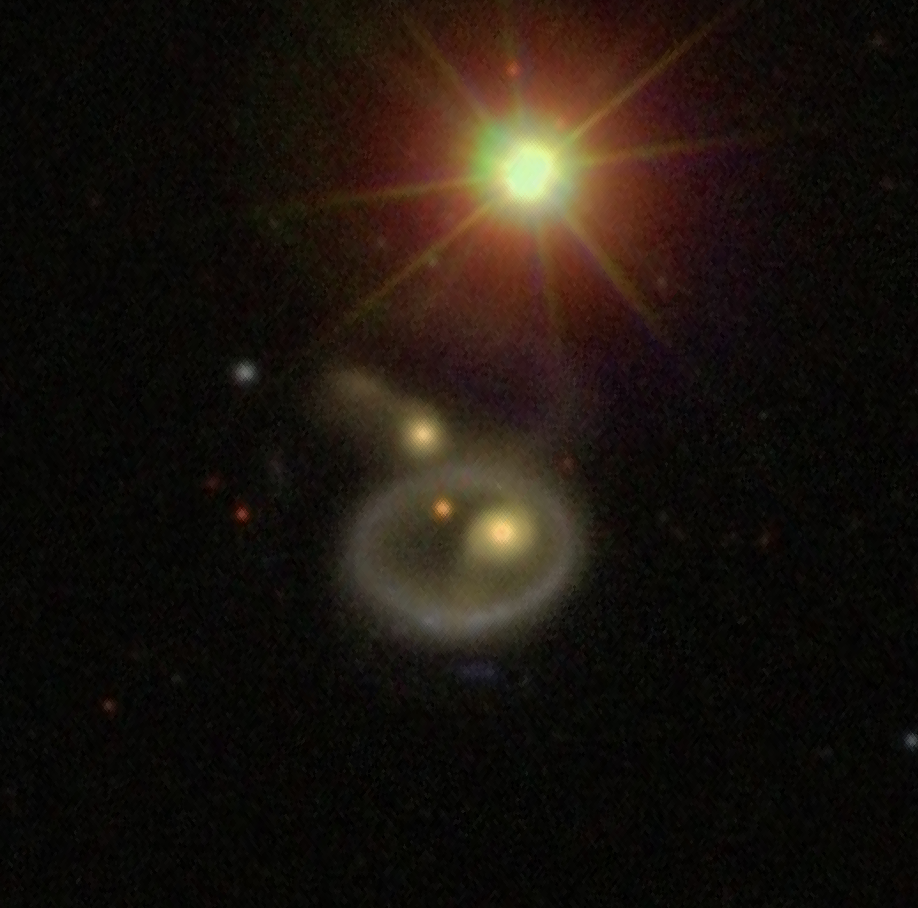
Ring Galaxy - II Hz 4

Image of NGC 985 by Hubble

== See also ==
- List of ring galaxies – Astronomical objects
- Interacting galaxy – Galaxies with interacting gravitational fields
- Hoag's object – Galaxy in the constellation Serpens Caput
- Cartwheel Galaxy – Galaxy in the constellation Sculptor
- AM 0644-741 – Ring galaxy in the constellation of Volans
- Arp 147 – Interacting galaxy in the constellation Cetus
- Polar-ring galaxy – Galaxy with an outer ring of gas and stars
- LEDA 1000714 – Hoag-type ring galaxy in the constellation Crater
