= PGC 6240 =

Galaxy in the constrellation Hydrus

White Rose Galaxy
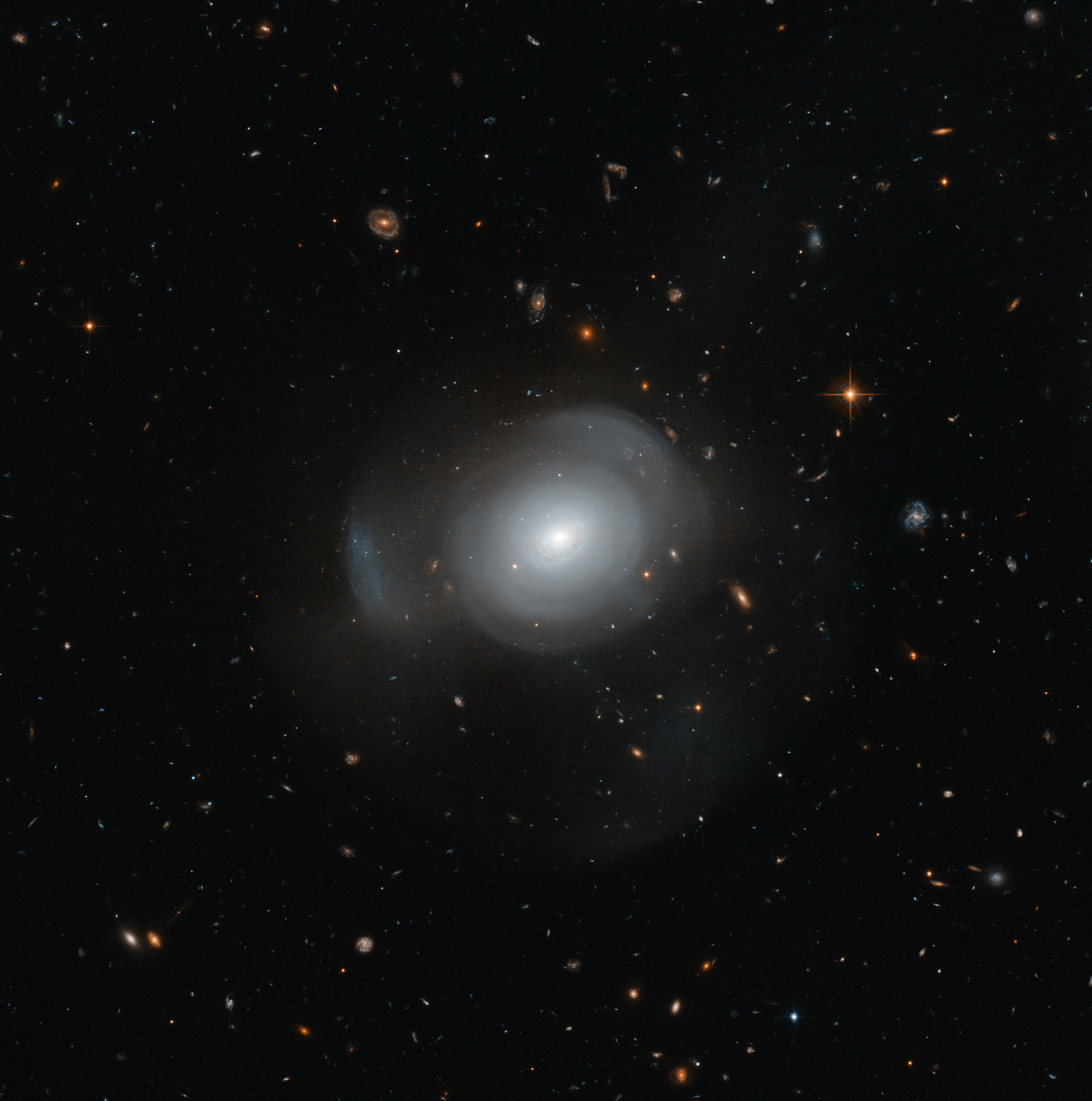
- Petal-like shells of the giant early-type galaxy PGC 6240

Observation data (J2000 epoch)
- Constellation: Hydrus
- Right ascension: 01^{h} 41^{m} 30.906^{s}
- Declination: −65° 36′ 56.4″
- Distance: 345 Mly (106 Mpc)

Characteristics
- Type: S0d

Other designations
- 6dFGS gJ014131.0-653656, AM 0139-655

PGC 6240, also known as AM 0139-655 or the White Rose Galaxy, is a very large and old galaxy in the southern constellation of Hydrus, about 345 million light years away from Earth.

Appearing like a white rose in the sky, the galaxy has foggy shells of stars that rotate around a luminous center with few shells lying close to it while others at a distance. Those distant from the center appear disconnected from the white rose.

The age of globular clusters in this galaxy is variable. They include a population of relatively young globular clusters around 400 million years old, another group of older ones around 1 billion years old, and other ones even older than that. The ages of the younger two align with the ages of the shells around the galaxy proper. This suggests that the younger clusters and shells formed in bouts of starburst star formation following the merger of the galaxy with another. Also, there are thousands of distant galaxies in the background of PGC 6240.

== Notes and references ==
Bibliography

- Malin, DF; Carter, D. (1983). "A catalog of elliptical galaxies with shells". Astrophysical Journal. 274. 1: 534–540. Bibcode:1983ApJ...274..534M. doi:10.1086/161467.
- Maybhate, Aparna (2007). "Evidence for Three Subpopulations of Globular Clusters in the Early-Type Poststarburst Shell Galaxy AM". Astronomical Journal. 1729. 134 (5): 139–655. arXiv:0707.3133. Bibcode:2007AJ....134.1729M. doi:10.1086/521817. S2CID 12557470.
- Lazaro, Enrico de (Oct 11, 2013). "PGC 6240: Astronomers Spot Distant 'White Rose' Galaxy". sci-news.com.
