= Principal Galaxies Catalogue =

Astronomical catalog published in 1989 that lists 73,197 galaxies

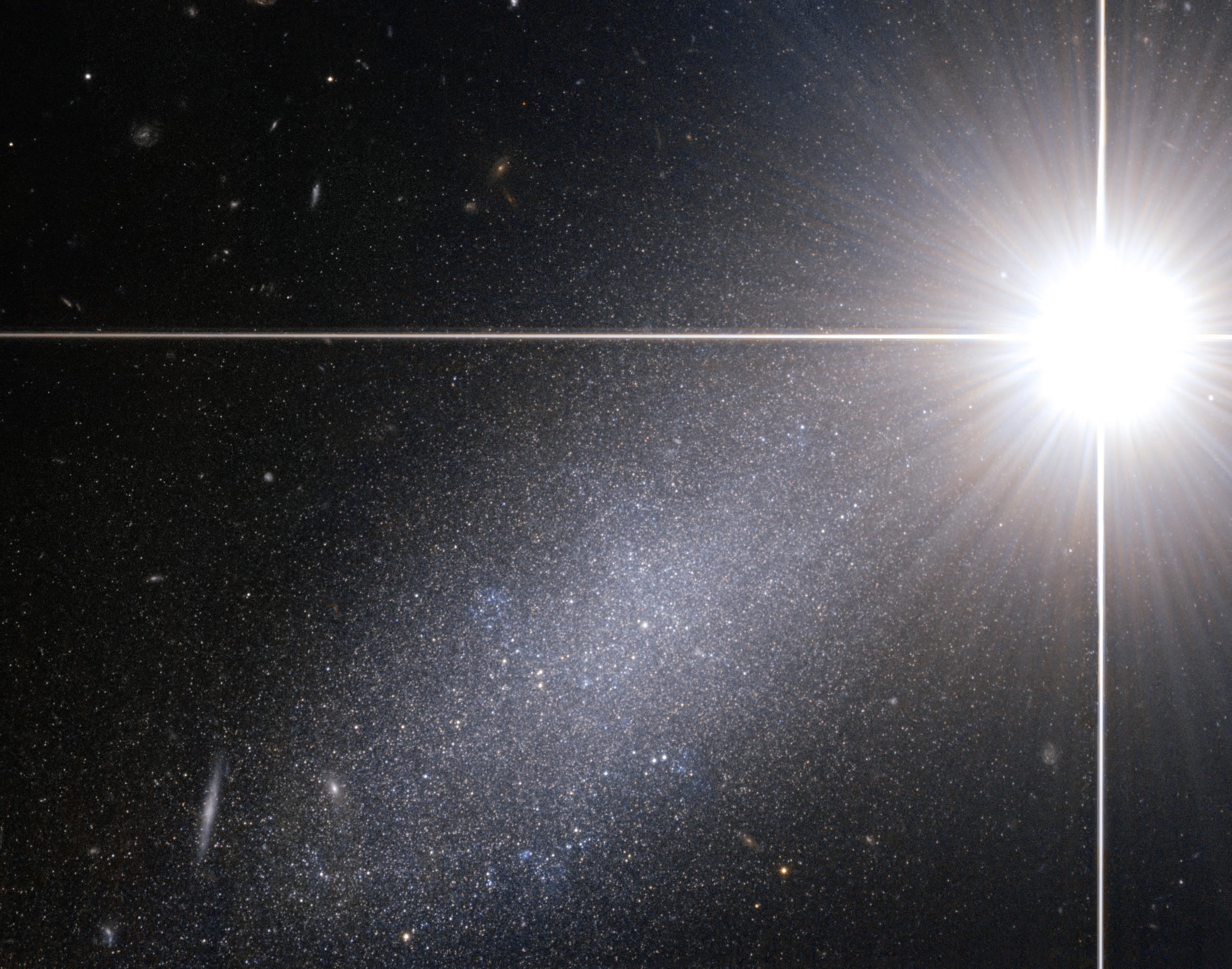
The obscured dwarf galaxy PGC 39058

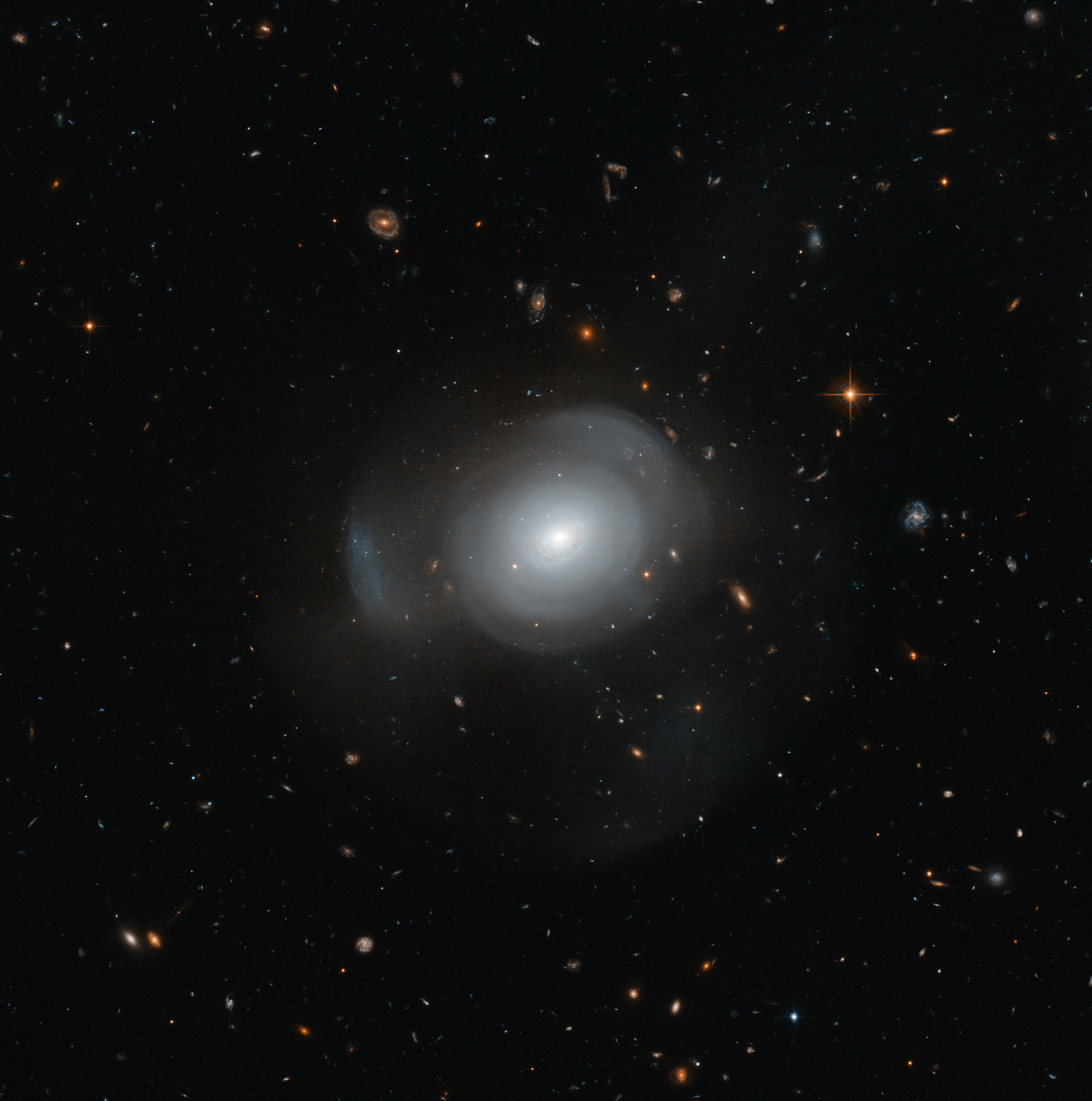
Hubble image of the elliptical galaxy PGC 6240.

The Principal Galaxies Catalogue (PGC) is an astronomical catalog published in 1989 that lists B1950 and J2000 equatorial coordinates and cross-identifications for 73,197 galaxies. It is based on the Lyon-Meudon Extragalactic Database (LEDA), which was originally started in 1983. 40,932 coordinates (56%) have standard deviations smaller than 10″. A total of 131,601 names from the 38 most common sources are listed. Available mean data for each object are given:

- 49,102 morphological descriptions,
- 52,954 apparent major and minor axis,
- 67,116 apparent magnitudes,
- 20,046 radial velocities and
- 24,361 position angles.

The Lyon-Meudon Extragalactic Database was eventually expanded into HyperLEDA, a database of a few million galaxies. Galaxies in the original PGC catalogue are numbered with their original PGC number in HyperLEDA. Numbers have also been assigned for the other galaxies, although for those galaxies not in the original PGC catalogue, it is not recommended to use that number as a name.

== Examples ==
PGC 39058 is a dwarf galaxy which is located approximately 14 million light-years away in the constellation of Draco. It is relatively nearby, however it is obscured by HD 106381, which is in front of the galaxy.

PGC 6240 (also known as White Rose Galaxy) is a large lenticular galaxy in the constellation Hydrus. It is located about 346 million light-years away from Earth.

== See also ==
- Category:Principal Galaxies Catalogue objects
- Astronomical catalogue
- Uppsala General Catalogue
