= NGC 774 =

Galaxy in the constellation Aries

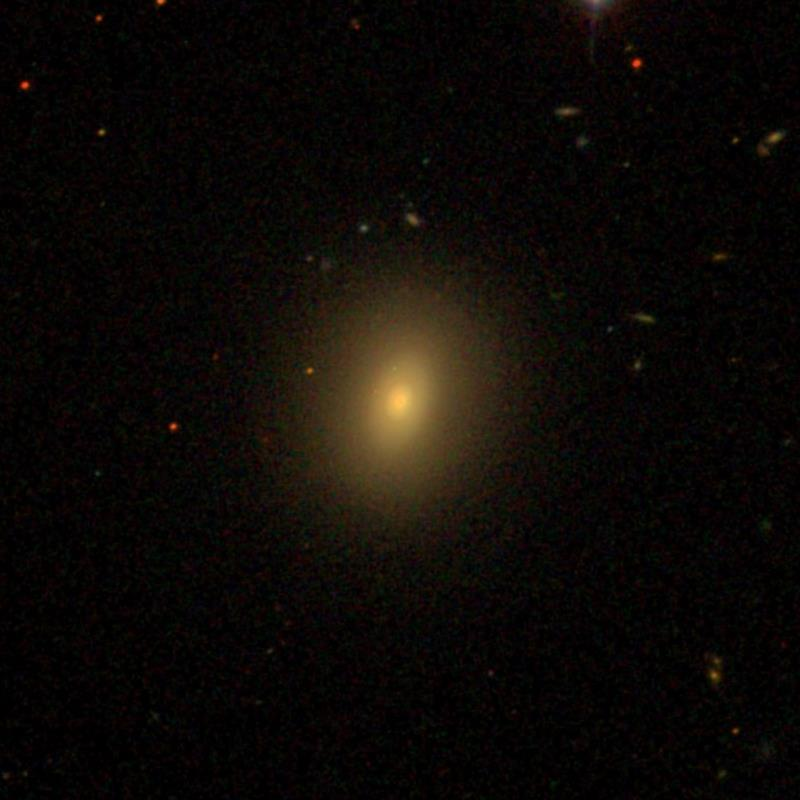
- NGC 774 by SDSS

Observation data (J2000 epoch)
- Constellation: Aries
- Right ascension: 01^{h} 59^{m} 34.7^{s}
- Declination: +14° 00′ 30″
- Redshift: 0.015326 ± 0.000008
- Heliocentric radial velocity: 4,595 ± 2 km/s
- Distance: 179 ± 18 Mly (54.8 ± 5.5 Mpc)
- Apparent magnitude (V): 13.1

Characteristics
- Type: S0
- Apparent size (V): 1.25′ × 0.96′

Other designations
- UGC 1469, MCG +02-06-008, CGCG 438-010, PGC 7536

NGC 774 is a lenticular galaxy in the constellation Aries. The galaxy lies about 180 million light years away from Earth, which means, given its apparent dimensions, that NGC 774 is approximately 70,000 light years across. It was discovered by William Herschel on October 16, 1784.

NGC 774 is a lenticular galaxy. The nucleus of the galaxy is a faint source of [NII]6584 and H-alpha emission. A ring is visible in ultraviolet. The ring is possibly a place of active star formation, as it was the location of a core-collapse supernova. Ionised gas is located asymmetrical around the nucleus, at a distance up to 20 arcseconds, which corresponds to 6 kpc at the distance of the galaxy. Stellar kinematics indicate it has a double stellar ring. A faint dust ring is also visible.

One supernova has been observed in NGC 774, SN 2006ee. It was discovered on 18 August 2006, at an apparent magnitude of 17.6, by the Katzman Automatic Imaging Telescope. It was categorised spectrally as a type II supernova.

NGC 774 forms a pair with UGC 1468, which lies 4 arcminutes away. NGC 774 is a member of a galaxy group include UGC 1496, NGC 786, UGC 1512, and NGC 792.
