= NGC 1832 =

Galaxy in the constellation Lepus

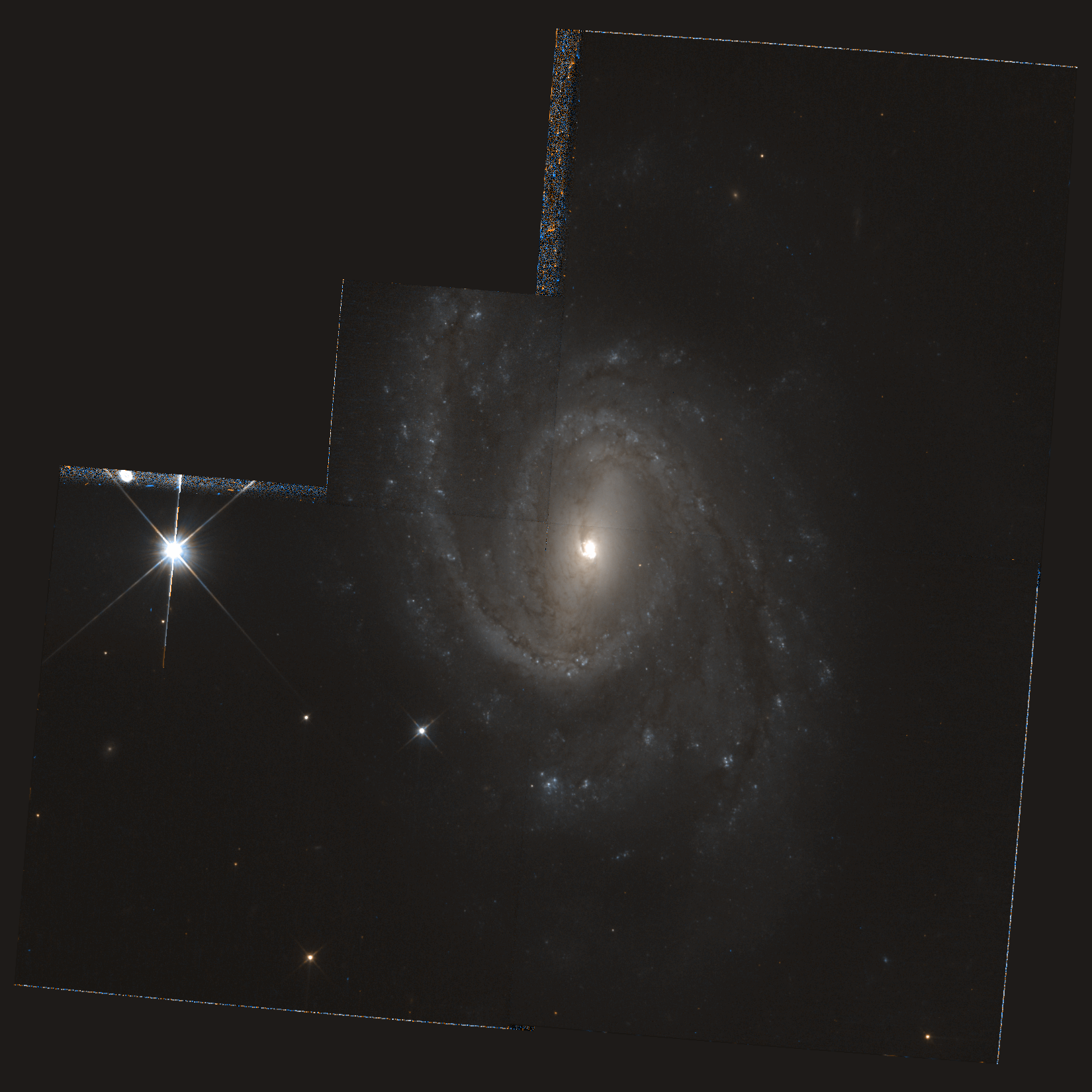
- NGC 1832 by the Hubble Space Telescope

Observation data (J2000 epoch)
- Constellation: Lepus
- Right ascension: 05^{h} 12^{m} 03.4^{s}
- Declination: −15° 41′ 16″
- Redshift: 0.006468 ± 0.000017
- Heliocentric radial velocity: 1,939 ± 5 km/s
- Distance: 78.8 ± 19.0 Mly (24.15 ± 5.8 Mpc)
- Apparent magnitude (V): 11.3

Characteristics
- Type: SB(r)bc
- Apparent size (V): 2.6′ × 1.7′

Other designations
- MCG -3-14-10, IRAS 05098-1544, PGC 16906

NGC 1832 is a barred spiral galaxy in the constellation Lepus. The galaxy lies about 80 million light years away from Earth, which means, given its apparent dimensions, that NGC 1832 is approximately 55,000 light years across. It was discovered by William Herschel on February 4, 1785.

== Characteristics ==
The galaxy has a bright nucleus. The bar has bright ansae at its ends and two loosely wounded arms in a nearly grand design pattern emanate from there. The arms form a nearly complete inner ring at the end of the bar. The ring has a radius of 13 arcseconds and has an estimated star formation rate of 0.70 ± 0.20 M_{☉}. The ring appears as a pseudoring in H-alpha. There is also Hα emission from the nucleus not between the nucleus and the inner ring. The west arm appears diffuse and resembles more like narrow spiral arm fragments. The east arm is better defined. Both arms complete less than half of revolution before fading. There are many HII regions along both arms, the largest of which are more than two arcseconds across. The star formation doesn't appear to be due to a leading density wave causing a pressure shock to the arms of the galaxy.

=== Supernovae ===
Two supernovae have been observed in NGC 1832:

- SN 2004gq (Type Ib, peak visual magnitude 15.3) was discovered independently on 11 December 2004 by H. Pugh and W. Li, using the Katzman Automatic Imaging Telescope, and by F. Manzini, as part of the Stazione Astronomica di Sozzago Supernova Search.
- SN 2009kr (Type II-L) was discovered by Kōichi Itagaki on 6 November 2009 at an apparent magnitude of 16. The progenitor star was identified in images by the Hubble Space Telescope as a luminous supergiant with a mass over 18 M_{☉}, the first time a progenitor of a type II-L supernova was identified.

== Nearby galaxies ==
NGC 1832 is the foremost galaxy of the NGC 1832 Group, also known as LGG 129. Other members of the group include spiral galaxies MCG-3-14-1, MCG-3-14-4, MCG-2-14-2, and MCG-2-14-4.
