= UGC 9425 =

Interacting galaxies in the constellation Boötes

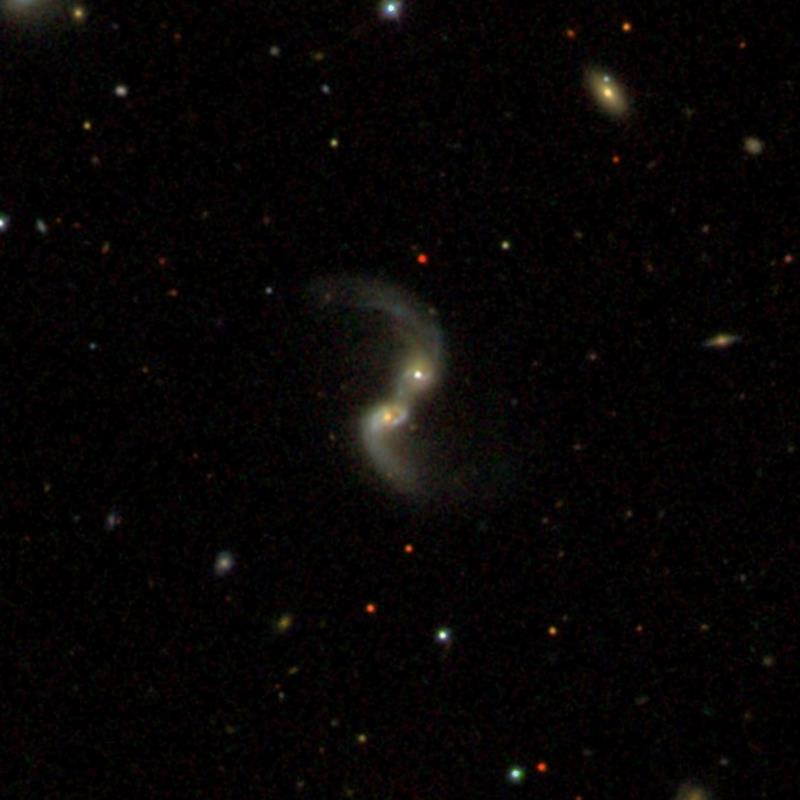
- SDSS image of UGC 9425

Observation data (J2000 epoch)
- Constellation: Boötes
- Right ascension: 14^{h} 37^{m} 50.8^{s}
- Declination: +30° 28′ 52.4″
- Redshift: 0.034717 ± 0.000110
- Heliocentric radial velocity: 10,408 km/s
- Distance: 468 Mly (143.6 ± 10.1 Mpc)
- Surface brightness: 15

Characteristics
- Type: S?
- Apparent size (V): 1.1' x 0.6'

Other designations
- PGC 52283/87675, Arp 241, MCG +05-34-083, VV 264

UGC 9425 (also known as Segner's Wheel) are a pair of interacting galaxies located in the constellation of Boötes, comprising PGC 52283 and PGC 87675, both disk-type galaxies. It is located 468 million light-years from Earth and catalogued as Arp 241 by Halton Arp.

== Supernova ==
One supernova was discovered in UGC 9425 by W.D. Li from the University of California via unfiltered images taken from the Katzman Automatic Imaging Telescope. Designated SN 2001ck, the supernova was located 5".8 west and 3".0 north of the nucleus. Further investigations by astronomers from Harvard Smithsonian Center for Astrophysics, confirmed it as a Type Ia supernova with an expansion velocity of 11,000 kilometers per second.
