= NGC 2196 =

Galaxy in the constellation Lepus

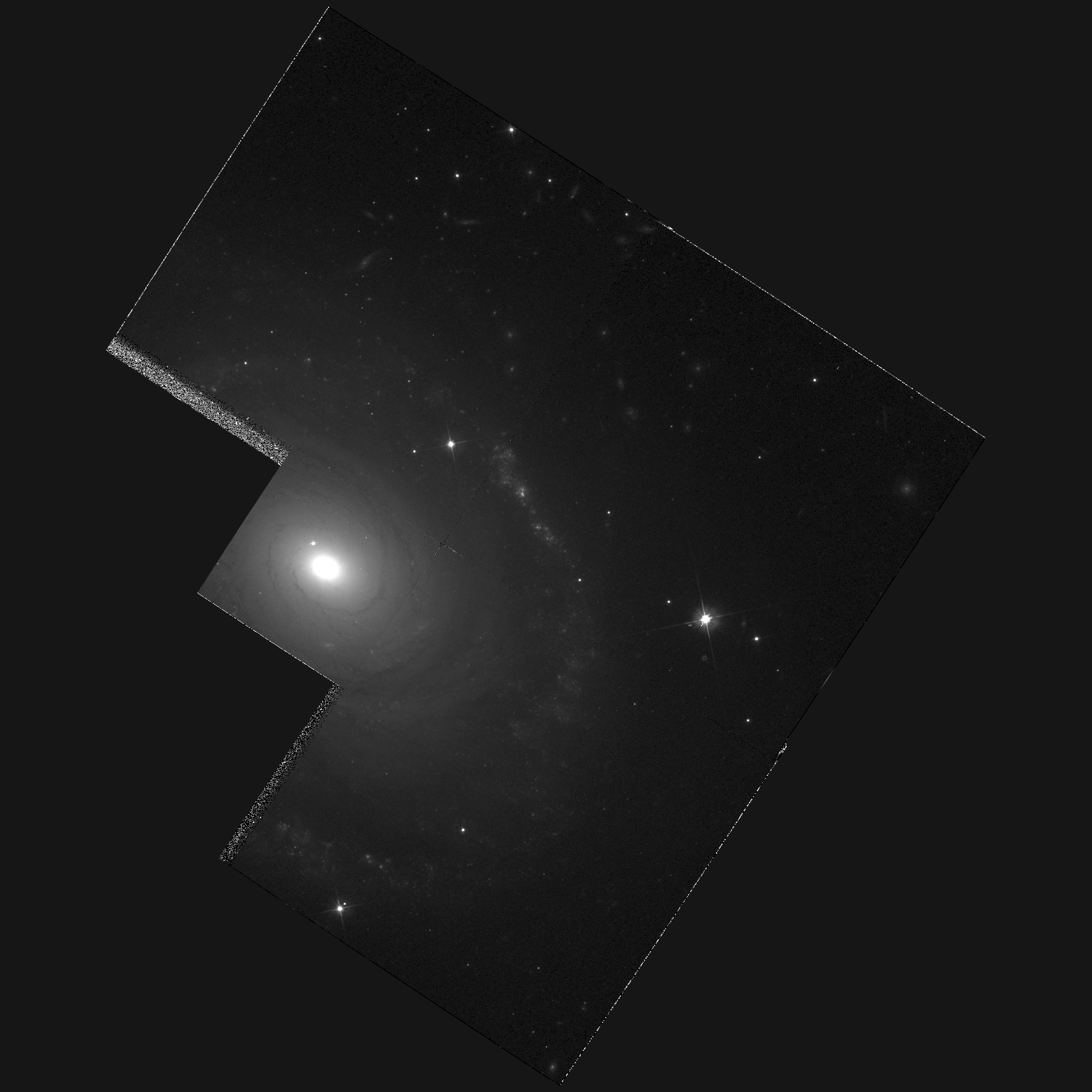
- NGC 2196 imaged by the Hubble Space Telescope

Observation data (J2000 epoch)
- Constellation: Lepus
- Right ascension: 06^{h} 12^{m} 09.7^{s}
- Declination: −21° 48′ 21″
- Redshift: 0.007735 ± 0.000009
- Heliocentric radial velocity: 2,319 ± 3 km/s
- Distance: 100 ± 7.5 Mly (30.6 ± 2.3 Mpc)
- Apparent magnitude (V): 10.9

Characteristics
- Type: (R':)SA(rs)ab
- Apparent size (V): 2.8′ × 2.2′

Other designations
- UGCA 121, ESO 556-4, MCG -4-15-14, IRAS 06100-2147, PGC 18602

NGC 2196 is an unbarred spiral galaxy in the constellation Lepus. The galaxy lies about 100 million light years away from Earth based on redshift independent methods, which means, given its apparent dimensions, that NGC 2196 is approximately 85,000 light years across. It was discovered by William Herschel on November 20, 1784.

NGC 2196 has a bright nucleus surrounded by a large elliptical bulge. Around the bulge lies a low-surface-brightness disk. Spiral arms are visible in the central 30 arcseconds of the disk. The disk has tightly wound spiral arms and the outer arms have a grand design pattern. The outer arms form a pseudoring measuring 1.5 by 1.4 arcminutes. The galaxy is slightly asymmetric.

One transient has been discovered in NGC 2196, PSN J06120295-2149353. It was discovered on 20 January 2014 using the Katzman Automatic Imaging Telescope and upon discovery had an apparent magnitude of 18 in red wavelengths. Its classification is uncertain and could be a supernova or variable star in our galaxy.

NGC 2196 is the foremost galaxy of the NGC 2196 Group, which also includes NGC 2211, and NGC 2212.
