= SDSS J0849+1114 =

Trio of interacting galaxies in the constellation Cancer

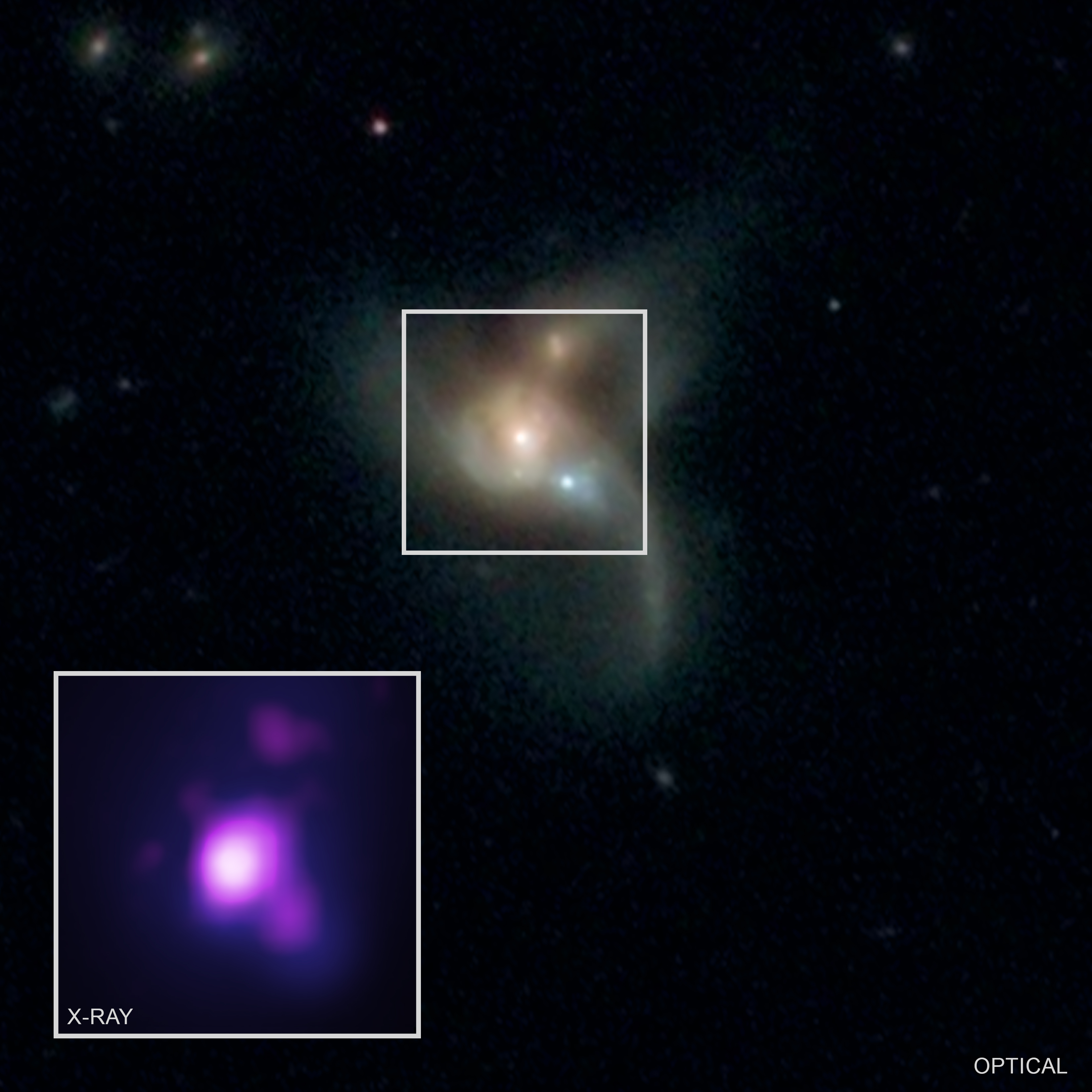
- SDSS J0849+1114 in optical and as captured by the Chandra X-ray Observatory

Observation data (J2000.0 epoch)
- Constellation: Cancer
- Right ascension: 08^{h} 49^{m} 05.51^{s}
- Declination: +11° 14′ 47.8″
- Redshift: 0.077447
- Heliocentric radial velocity: 23,818 km/s
- Distance: 1.059 Gly (325 Mpc)
- Apparent magnitude (V): 0.10
- Apparent magnitude (B): 0.14
- Surface brightness: 16.66
- Notable features: triple active galactic nucleus

Other designations
- SDSS J084905.51+111447.2, IRAS 08463+1126, LEDA 1390839, NVSS J084905+111448

SDSS J0849+1114 (SDSS J084905.51+111447.2) is a late-stage galaxy merger forming from a trio of galaxies located in the constellation of Cancer. With a redshift of 0.077, they are located 1.06 billion light-years from Earth. First discovered as a triple active galactic nucleus (AGN) candidate in a Sloan Digital Sky Survey study published in 2011, they received significant attention when astronomers discovered it harbors three supermassive black holes in its center.

== Characteristics ==
SDSS J0849+1114 is made up of three closely spaced interacting spiral galaxies, all showing signs of distortion. It has tidal tail features indicative of a late-stage merger. The nuclei in SDSS J0849+1114 are considered active and the galaxies classified as type 2 Seyferts according to long-slit spectroscopy observations from Apache Point Observatory. A study also mentions out of the triple AGN candidates studied, SDSS J0849+1114 is also the first known triple Seyfert nucleus. In addition, they are classified as luminous infrared galaxies with luminosity of 8-1000 μm.

According to a study published in 2022, the primary nucleus of SDSS J0849+1114 is more powerful compared to the secondary and tertiary nuclei. Further evidence also points out it has a double-sided jet with its orientation changing by 20 degrees, explaining the angular momentum of the black hole might be changed by a merger-enhanced accretion. The secondary nucleus shows absence of radio emission at all frequencies while the tertiary nucleus also has a two-sided jet but shown enlarging a radio lobe. Based on the internal energy of the lobe, it is estimated 5.0 × 10^{55} erg. Furthermore, the three nuclei showed extended disc and budge components which the two showed signs of tidal stripping by the main nucleus.

== Supermassive black holes ==
The three supermassive black holes in SDSS J0849+1114 are found colliding together with a separation gap of only between 10,000 and 30,000 light-years. All of them are surrounded by dusty structures and each of the black holes have a mass of ~10^{7.5} M_{☉}, 10^{6.4} M_{☉} and 10^{6.7} M_{☉} respectively. According to Chandra and NuSTAR observations, one of the black holes showed large quantities of interstellar matter surrounding its torus. It is estimated that the black holes from the merging galaxies will form a gravitationally bound triple black hole system within a few billion years.
