= PKS 2354−35 =

Type-cD galaxy in the constellation Sculptor

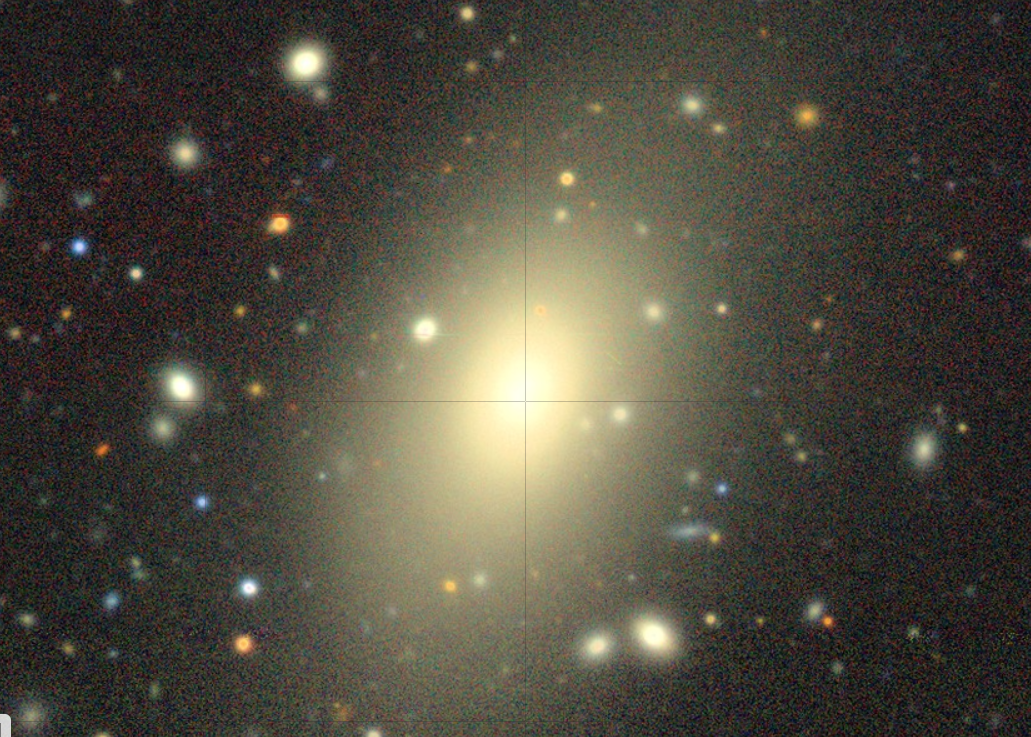
- PKS 2354−35 taken with DESI Legacy Surveys

Observation data (J2000 epoch)
- Constellation: Sculptor
- Right ascension: 23^{h} 57^{m} 00.72^{s}
- Declination: −34° 45′ 32.97″
- Redshift: 0.049051
- Heliocentric radial velocity: 14,705 km/s
- Distance: 707.0 ± 49.5 Mly (216.77 ± 15.18 Mpc)
- Group or cluster: Abell 4059
- Apparent magnitude (V): 14.42

Characteristics
- Type: cD;E+4;BrClG
- Size: ~641,600 ly (196.73 kpc) (estimated)

Other designations
- PGC 73000, ESO 349-G010, G4Jy 1858, ABELL 4059:[AAV2011] BCG, 2MASX J23570068-3445331, 6dF J2357006-344533

PKS 2354−35 also designated as ESO 349-010, is a type-cD galaxy located in the constellation of Sculptor. The redshift of the galaxy is (z) 0.049 and it was first discovered as an extragalactic radio source by astronomers in December 1965, whom they identified it with a spherical object surrounded by a diffused envelope. It is classified as a radio galaxy and is the brightest cluster galaxy in Abell 4059.

== Description ==
PKS 2354−35 is a cD galaxy dominating the center of Abell 4059. It has also been categorized as a Type I Fanaroff-Riley class radio galaxy and contains dust absorption features in its center when imaged by Hubble Space Telescope (HST). The radial profile of the galaxy is found to display no signs of rotation but the velocity dispersion profile is mainly positive. The optical spectrum of the galaxy contains both doubly ionized oxygen and ionized neon lines.

The radio source of PKS 2354−35 is found to be compact. When observed, it has a radio core component shown to have a size of around 0.4 arcseconds with a flux density of seven mJy. There is a presence of jet structure on both sides of the source. The radio spectrum has been described as extremely steep and the total radio luminosity has been calculated as 1.5 × 10^{42} erg s^{−1}. Two radio lobes have been detected in the galaxy, depicted as extending along a major axis and positioned perpendicularly towards an X-ray bar feature.

HST imaging has also detected the presence of a dust lane in PKS 2354−35. When observed, the dust lane is shown to have an extension of five arcseconds across with a projection across the central region. Evidence also found the dust lane is mainly twisted with a position angle of between 60° to 70° in relation to the galaxy's own radio axis. This suggested a recent galaxy merger around 10^{8} million years ago. The central supermassive black hole has been estimated as 0.7^{+1.0}_{-0.4} × 10^{9} M_{☉} based on a factor adjustment of 0.35, with an Eddington ratio of 1.2^{+4.6}_{-0.9} × 10^{−3} M_{edd}. A pair of X-ray cavities have been discovered inside a central region along with X-ray emission ridge that is associated with the galaxy. Evidence also suggested the galaxy's nucleus may be activated through tidal stripping of cold gas from a late-type starburst galaxy based on asymmetries of the interstellar medium.
