= NGC 660 =

Polar-ring galaxy in the constellation Pisces

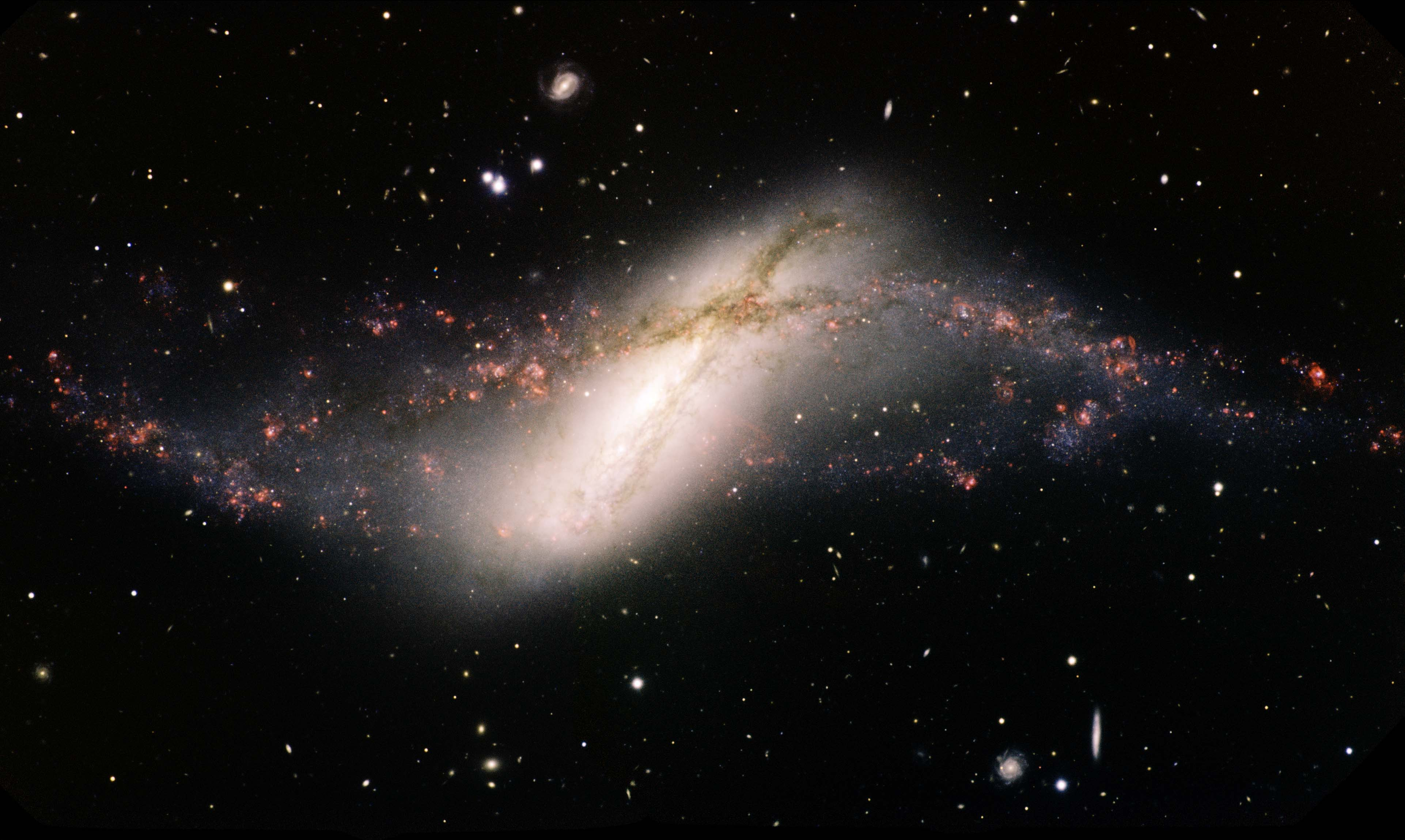
- NGC 660 showing polar-galaxy structure (Gemini Observatory, AURA)

Observation data (J2000.0 epoch)
- Constellation: Pisces
- Right ascension: 01^{h} 43^{m} 02.4^{s}
- Declination: +13° 38′ 42″
- Redshift: 0.002842
- Apparent magnitude (V): 12.0
- Magnitude (J): 8.531
- Magnitude (H): 7.721
- Magnitude (K): 7.336

Characteristics
- Type: SB(s)a pec / Polar-ring galaxy
- Apparent size (V): 2.710 × 0.840 arcmin

Other designations
- NGC 660, PGC 6318, LEDA 6318, UGC 1201

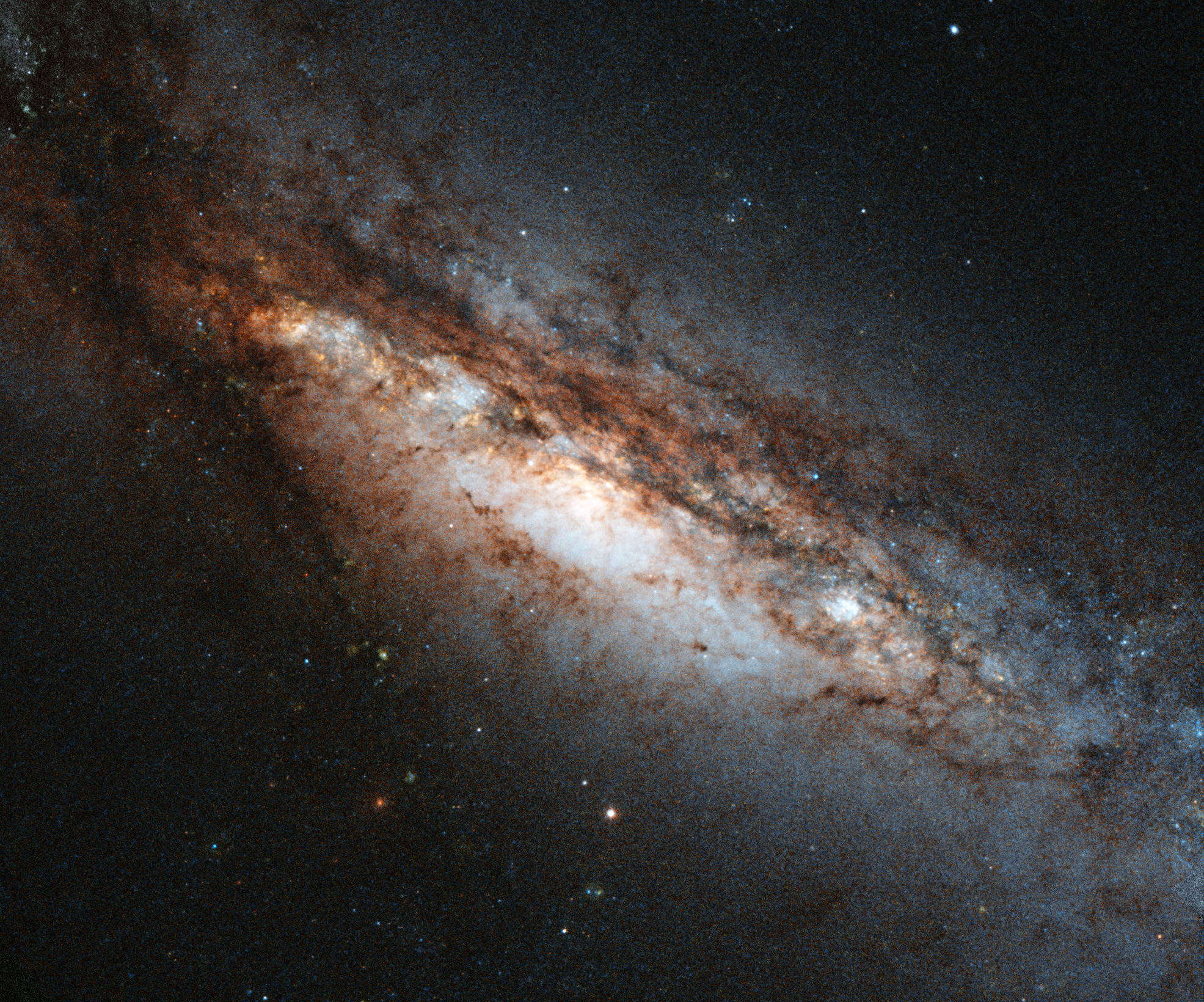
Hubble Space Telescope image of NGC 660

NGC 660 is a peculiar and unique polar-ring galaxy located approximately 45 million light-years from Earth in the constellation Pisces. It is the only such galaxy having, as its host, a "late-type lenticular galaxy". It was probably formed when two galaxies collided a billion years ago. However, it may have first started as a disk galaxy that captured matter from a passing galaxy. This material could have, over time, become "strung out" to form a rotating ring. NGC 660 is known to host an active galactic nucleus, with a Seyfert II nucleus.

The ring is not actually polar, but rather has an inclination from the plane of the host disk of approximately 45 degrees. The extreme number of pinkish star-forming areas that occurs along the galaxy's ring could be the result of the gravitation interaction caused by this collision. The ring is 50,000 light-years across – much broader than the disk itself – and has a greater amount of gas and star formation than the host disk. This likely indicates a very violent origin. The polar ring contains objects numbering in the hundreds, many of which are red and blue supergiant stars. The most recently created stars in the ring are approximately 7 million years old. This indicates that the formation of these stars has been a long process and is still occurring.

Data about the dark matter halo of NGC 660 can be extracted by observing the gravitational effects of the dark matter on the disk and ring's rotation. From the core of the disk, radio waves are being emitted. The source of these waves is an area only 21 light-years across. This may indicate the presence of a super-cluster of stars located within an area of cloud of gas. The region in the centre has a vast amount of star formation, so luminous that it is considered to be a starburst galaxy.

Late in 2012, this polar-ring galaxy produced an enormous outburst having a magnitude of approximately ten times brighter than a supernova explosion. The cause is not certain, but this event may have resulted from a tremendous jet being emanated from the galaxy's central black hole. NGC 660 has a star formation rate surface density ($\Sigma_{SFR}$) of $0.06 M_\odot yr^{-1} kpc^{-2}$.

== M74 and LGG 29 Group ==
NGC 660 is a member of the M74 Group.

NGC 660 is a member of a galaxy group known as LGG 29 or NGC 628 Group, which contains 7 galaxies, including NGC 628, UGC 1195, UGC 1200, UGC 1175, UGC 1176 and UGC 1171.

== See also ==
- List of polar-ring galaxies
