= SN 2003gd =

Supernova in the constellation Pisces

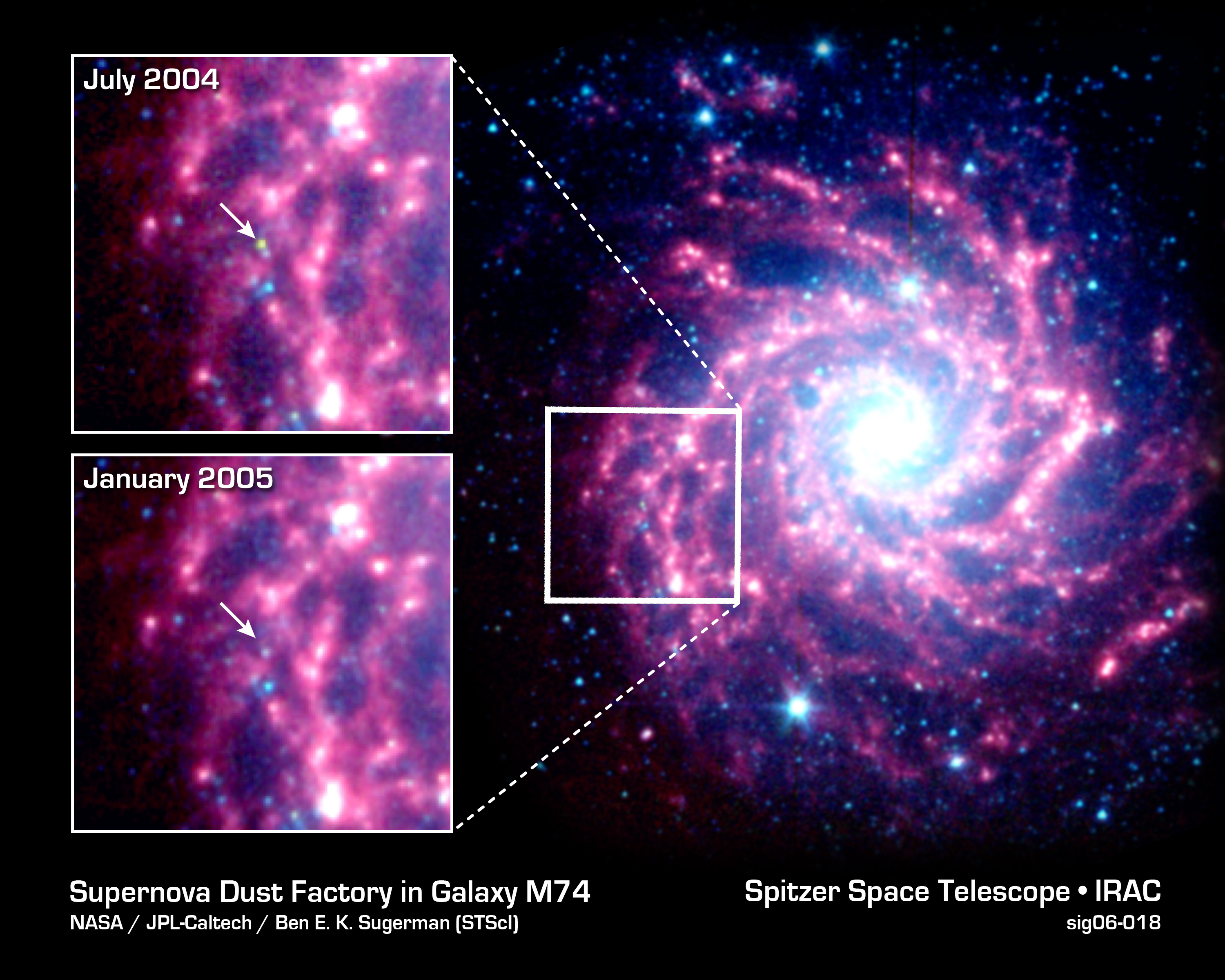
- Spitzer Space Telescope image of a dust cloud at the position of the SN 2003gd explosion
- Event type: Supernova
- Type II-P
- Date: c. 30.3 million years ago (discovered 12 June 2003 by Robert Evans)
- Constellation: Pisces
- Right ascension: 01^{h} 36^{m} 42.65^{s}
- Declination: +15° 44′ 20.9″
- Epoch: J2000.0
- Galactic coordinates: 138.6379° −45.7477°
- Distance: 30.3 ± 5.9 Mly (9.3 ± 1.8 Mpc)
- Host: Phantom Galaxy
- Progenitor: Red supergiant c. 8 solar masses
- Peak apparent magnitude: 13.2
- Other designations: SN 2003gd
- Related media on Commons

SN 2003gd was a Type II-P supernova explosion in the Phantom Galaxy, located in the constellation Pisces. SN 2003gd was discovered on 12 June 2003 by Robert Evans, using a 0.31m reflector, and its discovery was confirmed on 13 June 2003 by R. H. McNaught using the 1.0m telescope at the Siding Spring Observatory.

This supernova was located along the outer edge of a spiral arm, ~7.3 kpc from the galactic nucleus at an angular offset 13.2″ east and 161.0″ south of the core. It was discovered at the end of its "plateau phase", approximately 86 days after its estimated explosion date of 18 March 2003. Despite a lower tail luminosity in the light curve, this appears to be a normal Type II-P. A light echo from nearby dust was detected in archival images from 2004.

Messier 74 had been observed approximately 300 days before the explosion with the Gemini Telescope and about 200 days before using the Hubble Space Telescope. Astronomers were able to identify an object in these pre-supernova images that was in the same position as SN 2003gd, and which is believed to be the supernova's progenitor star. This progenitor star was a red supergiant with a mass of ~8 M_{☉}, consistent with the expectations of existing single-star stellar evolution models. It is the first progenitor of a normal type II-P supernova to have ever been detected.
