= M74 Group =

Small group of galaxies in the constellation of Pisces

Observation data (Epoch J2000)
- Constellation: Pisces
- Right ascension: 01^{h} 43^{m}
- Declination: +14° 22′
- Brightest member: Messier 74
- Number of galaxies: 5-7

Other designations
- NGC 628 Group, LGG 29, NOGG H 94, NOGG P1 84, NOGG P2 87

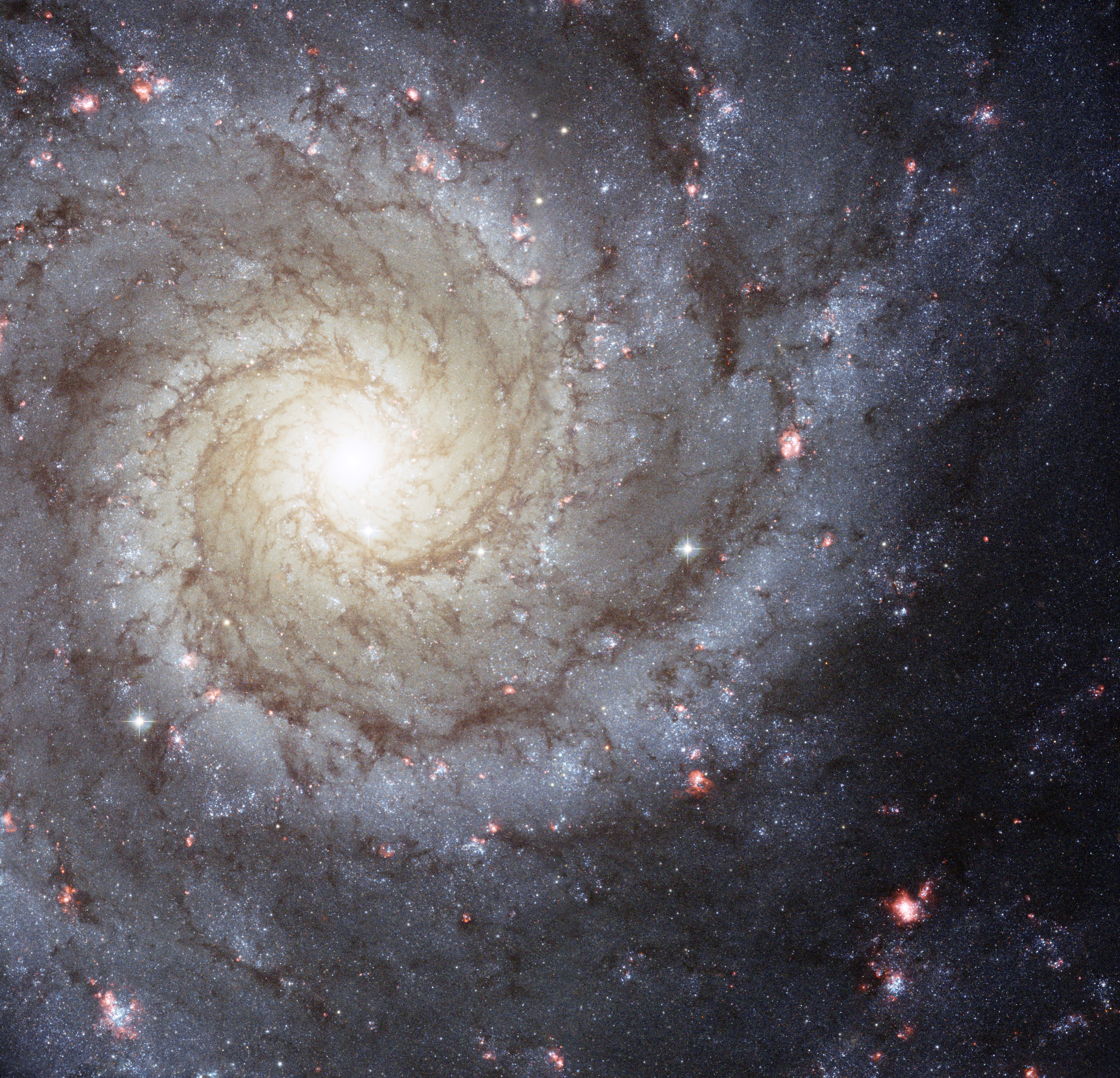
The grand-design spiral galaxy Messier 74 as photographed by the Hubble Space Telescope.

The M74 Group (also known as the NGC 628 Group) is a small group of galaxies in the constellation Pisces. The face-on spiral galaxy M74 (NGC 628) is the brightest galaxy within the group. Other members include the peculiar spiral galaxy NGC 660 and several smaller irregular galaxies . The M74 Group is one of many galaxy groups that lie within the Virgo Supercluster.

== Members ==
The table below lists galaxies that have been consistently identified as group members in the Nearby Galaxies Catalog, the Lyons Groups of Galaxies (LGG) Catalog, and the three group lists created from the Nearby Optical Galaxy sample of Giuricin et al.

Members of the M74 Group
| Name | Type | R.A. (J2000) | Dec. (J2000) | Redshift (km/s) | Apparent Magnitude |
|---|---|---|---|---|---|
| Messier 74 | SA(s)c | 01^{h} 36^{m} 41.8^{s} | +15° 47′ 01″ | 657 | 10.0 |
| NGC 660 | SB(s)a pec | 01^{h} 43^{m} 02.4^{s} | +13° 38′ 42″ | 850 | 12.0 |
| UGC 1176 | Im | 01^{h} 40^{m} 09.9^{s} | +15° 54′ 17″ | 630 | 14.4 |
| UGC 1195 | Sc | 01^{h} 42^{m} 27.0^{s} | +13° 58′ 37″ | 774 | 13.9 |
| UGC 1200 | IBm | 01^{h} 42^{m} 48.3^{s} | +13° 09′ 22″ | 808 | 14.0 |

Other possible members galaxies (galaxies listed in only one or two of the lists from the above references) include the irregular galaxies UGC 891, UGC 1104, UGC 1171, UGC 1175, and UGCA 20.
