= SN 1999ec =

1999 type Ib supernova event in the constellation Canis Major

SN 1999EC
- Event type: Supernova
- SN Ib
- Date: October 2, 1999
- Constellation: Canis Major
- Right ascension: 06^{h} 16^{m} 16.16^{s}
- Declination: −21° 22′ 09.8″
- Epoch: J2000.0
- Galactic coordinates: 228.6723 -17.0277
- Distance: 31.3 Mpc
- Host: NGC 2207)
- Progenitor: 38 M_{☉} star
- Peak apparent magnitude: 17.9
- Other designations: SN 1999ec

SN 1999ec was a Type Ib supernova that was discovered in the interacting galaxy NGC 2207 on October 2, 1999. It was found on images taken with the Katzman Automatic Imaging Telescope at the Lick Observatory. The progenitor is estimated to have had 38 times the mass of the Sun and was 5.34 million years old at the time of the outburst.
