= NGC 4125 =

Galaxy in the constellation Draco

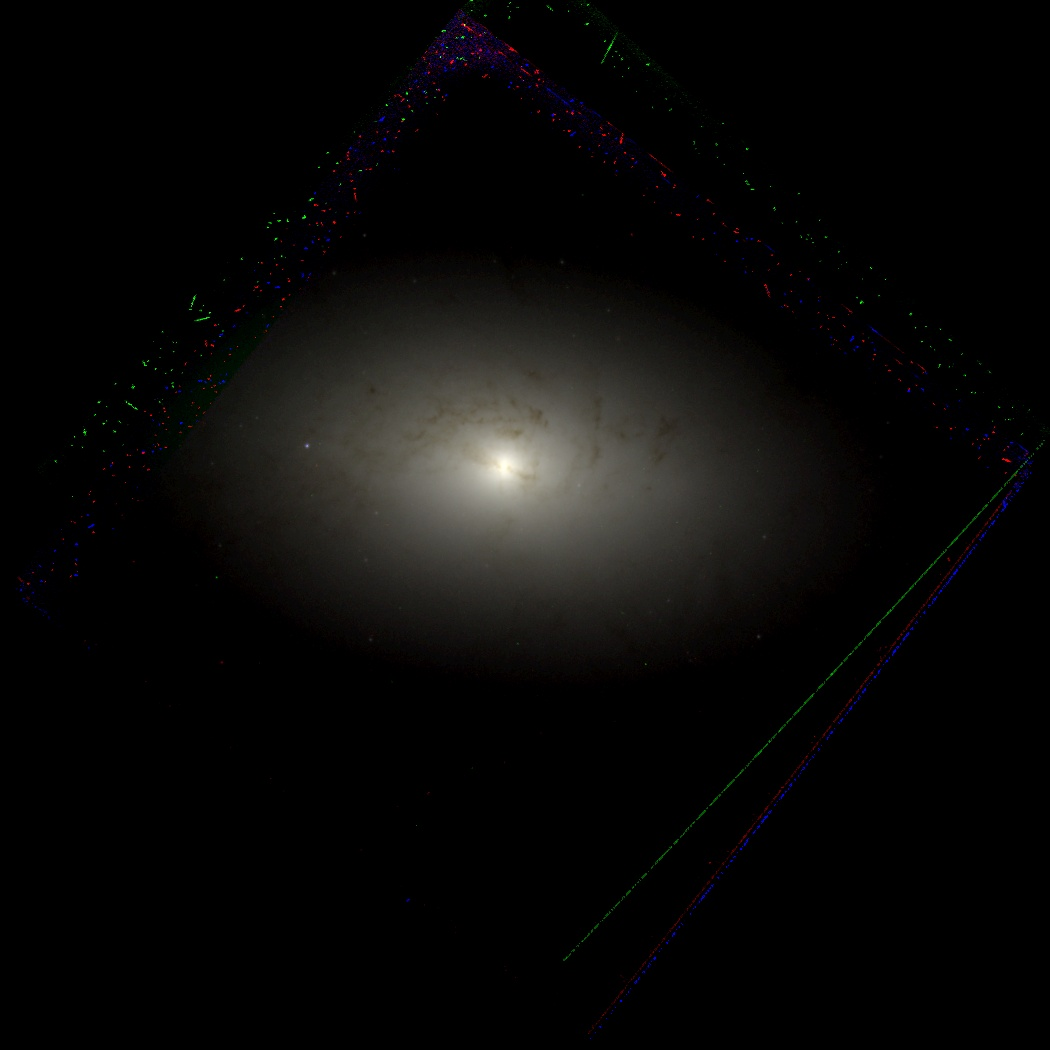
- NGC 4125 imaged by the Hubble Space Telescope

Observation data (J2000 epoch)
- Constellation: Draco
- Right ascension: 12^{h} 08^{m} 06.017^{s}
- Declination: +65° 10′ 26.878″
- Redshift: 0.004273
- Heliocentric radial velocity: 1281 ± 14 km/s
- Distance: 66.9 ± 4.8 Mly (20.50 ± 1.47 Mpc)
- Apparent magnitude (V): 10.7

Characteristics
- Type: E6 pec
- Size: ~140,000 ly (42.92 kpc) (estimated)
- Apparent size (V): 5.8′ × 3.2′

Other designations
- IRAS 12055+6527, UGC 7118, MCG +11-15-027, PGC 38524, CGCG 315-019

NGC 4125 is an elliptical galaxy in the constellation Draco. It was discovered on 4 January 1850 by English astronomer John Russell Hind.

== Supernova ==
One supernova has been observed in NGC 4125. SN 2016coj (Type Ia, mag. 14.8) was discovered by the Lick Observatory Supernova Search (LOSS), using the Katzman Automatic Imaging Telescope, on 28 May 2016. After detection, it became brighter over the course of several days. It reached magnitude 13, making it the brightest supernova of 2016.

== See also ==
- List of NGC objects (4001–5000)
