= SN 2013ej =

Supernova in the constellation Pisces

- Event type: Supernova
- SN II-P
- Date: 25 July 2013
- Constellation: Pisces
- Right ascension: 01^{h} 36^{m} 48.16^{s}
- Declination: +15° 45′ 31.0″
- Epoch: J2000.0
- Distance: 30±6 Mly
- Redshift: 0.002
- Host: Messier 74 (NGC 628)
- Progenitor: ?
- Progenitor type: Red supergiant
- Colour (B-V): Unknown
- Notable features: N/A
- Peak apparent magnitude: 12.1

SN 2013ej was a Type II-P supernova in the nearby spiral galaxy Messier 74 (NGC 628). It was discovered by the Lick Observatory Supernova Search on July 25, 2013, with the 0.76 m Katzman Automatic Imaging Telescope, with pre-discovery images having been taken the day before.

Supernova 2013ej was noted for being as bright as 12th magnitude.

SN 2013ej was compared to supernovas SN 2004et and SN 2007od. Based on various observations it has been theorized that the supernova originated from a red supergiant star that went supernova.

SN 2013ej is one of the brightest Type II supernova detected to-date in NGC 628.
