= SN 2003H =

2002–2003 Supernova in the constellation Canis Major

- Event type: Supernova
- Ibc-pec
- Discovered: January 8, 2003
- Constellation: Canis Major
- Right ascension: 06^{h} 16^{m} 25.68^{s}
- Declination: −21° 22′ 23.8″
- Epoch: J2000.0
- Galactic coordinates: 228.6912, -16.9952
- Distance: 115 Mly (35.2 Mpc)
- Host: NGC 2207
- Peak apparent magnitude: 17.8
- Other designations: SN 2003H

SN 2003H was a supernova that appeared halfway between the colliding NGC 2207 and IC 2163 galaxies. It was discovered on January 8, 2003, by the Lick Observatory and Tenagra Supernova Searches (LOTOSS).
