= NGC 786 =

Galaxy in the constellation Aries

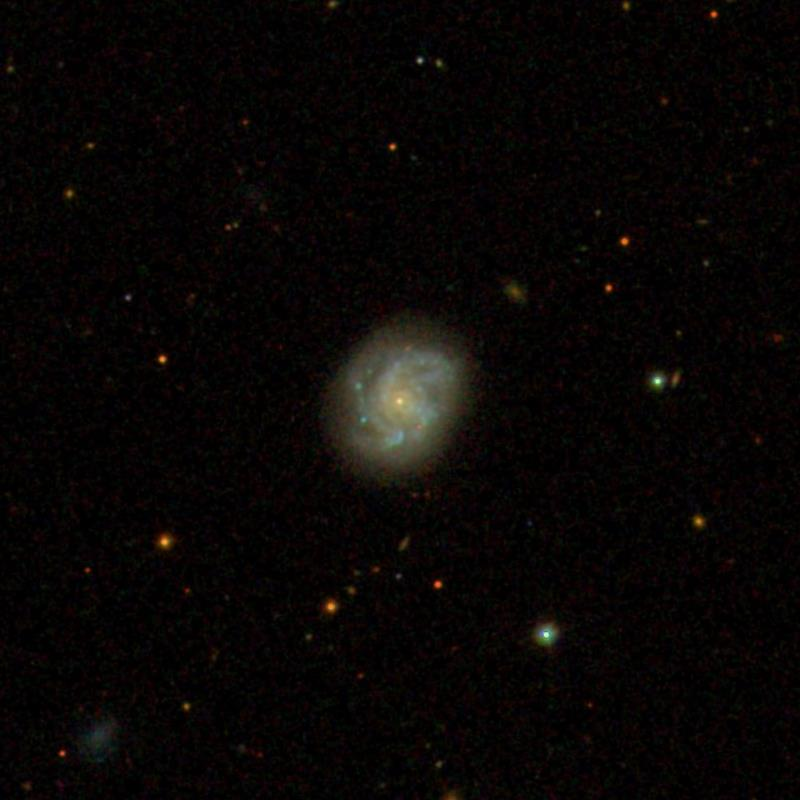

Observation data
- Constellation: Aries
- Right ascension: 02^{h} 02^{m} 49^{s}
- Declination: +15° 46′ 16″
- Redshift: z = 0.014910 ± 9.00e-6
- Apparent magnitude (B): 14.330 mag
- Surface brightness: 22.51 mag/arcsec^{2}
- magnitude (J): 11.993 mag
- magnitude (H): 11.17
- magnitude (K): 10.83

Characteristics
- Type: GS?

NGC 786 is a spiral galaxy in the constellation Aries about 195 million light-years away from the Milky Way. It was discovered on September 26, 1865, by the astronomer Heinrich Louis d'Arrest.
