= NGC 2207 and IC 2163 =

Pair of colliding spiral galaxies in the constellation Canis Major

NGC 2207 / IC 2163
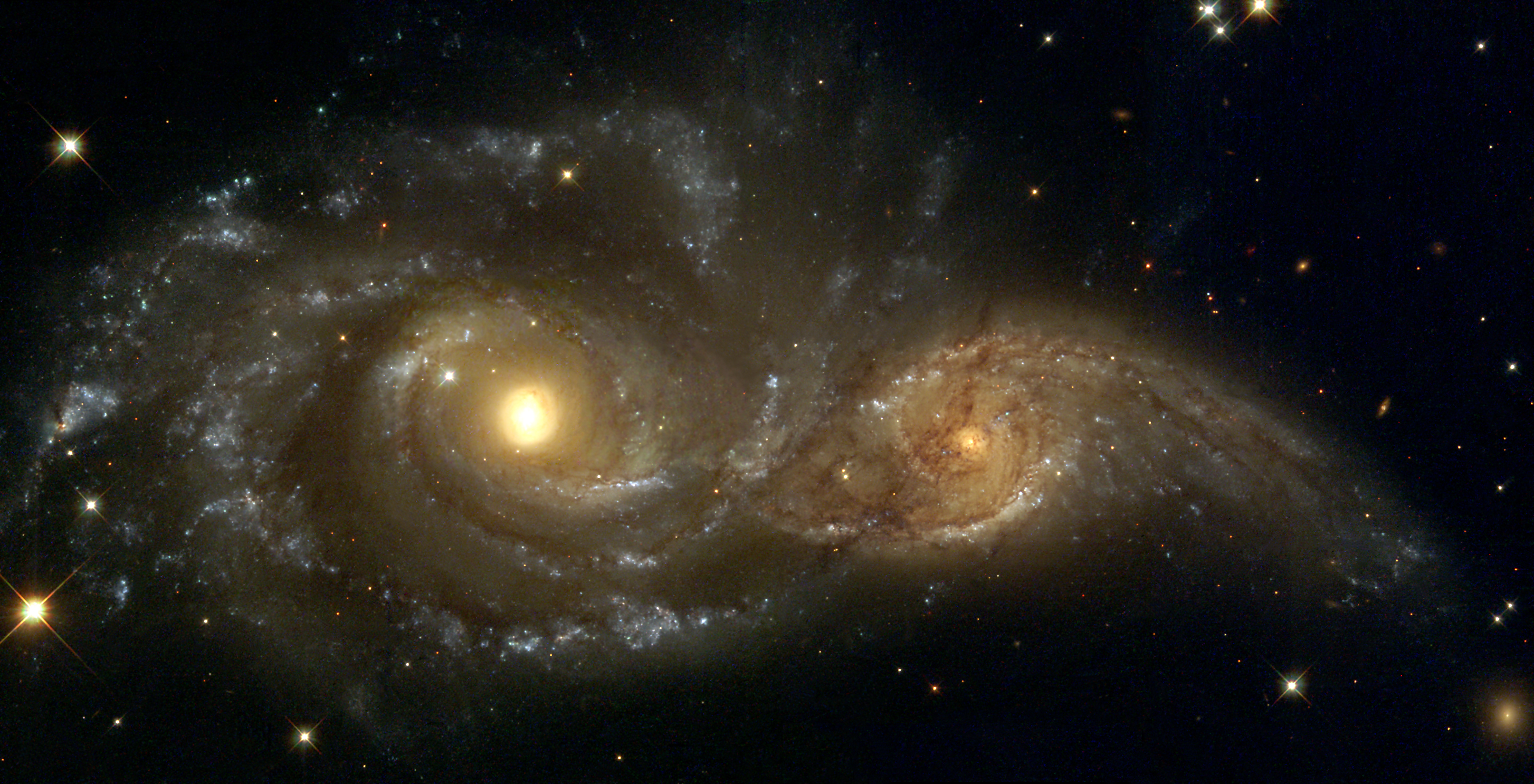
- Hubble Space Telescope image of NGC 2207 (left) and IC 2163 (right)

Observation data (J2000 epoch)
- Constellation: Canis Major
- Right ascension: 06^{h} 16^{m} 22.0^{s} / 06^{h} 16^{m} 28.0^{s}
- Declination: −21° 22′ 22″ / −21° 22′ 33″
- Redshift: 0.0092 [ 2741 ± 15 / 2765 ± 20 km/s ]
- Distance: 81 ± 39 Mly (24.9 ± 12 Mpc)
- Apparent magnitude (V): 12.2 / 11.6

Characteristics
- Type: SAB(rs)bc pec / SB(rs)c pec
- Size: 123,400 ly / 87,650 ly
- Apparent size (V): 4.3′ × 2.8′ / 3.0′ × 1.2′
- Notable features: colliding galaxies

Other designations
- RR132a / RR132b, PGC 018749 / 018751, UGCA 124/125, NGC 2207/IC 2163, Cosmic Owl

NGC 2207 and IC 2163 are a pair of colliding spiral galaxies about 80 million light-years away in the constellation Canis Major. NGC 2207 was discovered by British astronomer John Herschel on 24 January 1835, while IC 2163 was discovered by Herbert Howe on 11 February 1898. The pair together carry the nickname the Cosmic Owl.

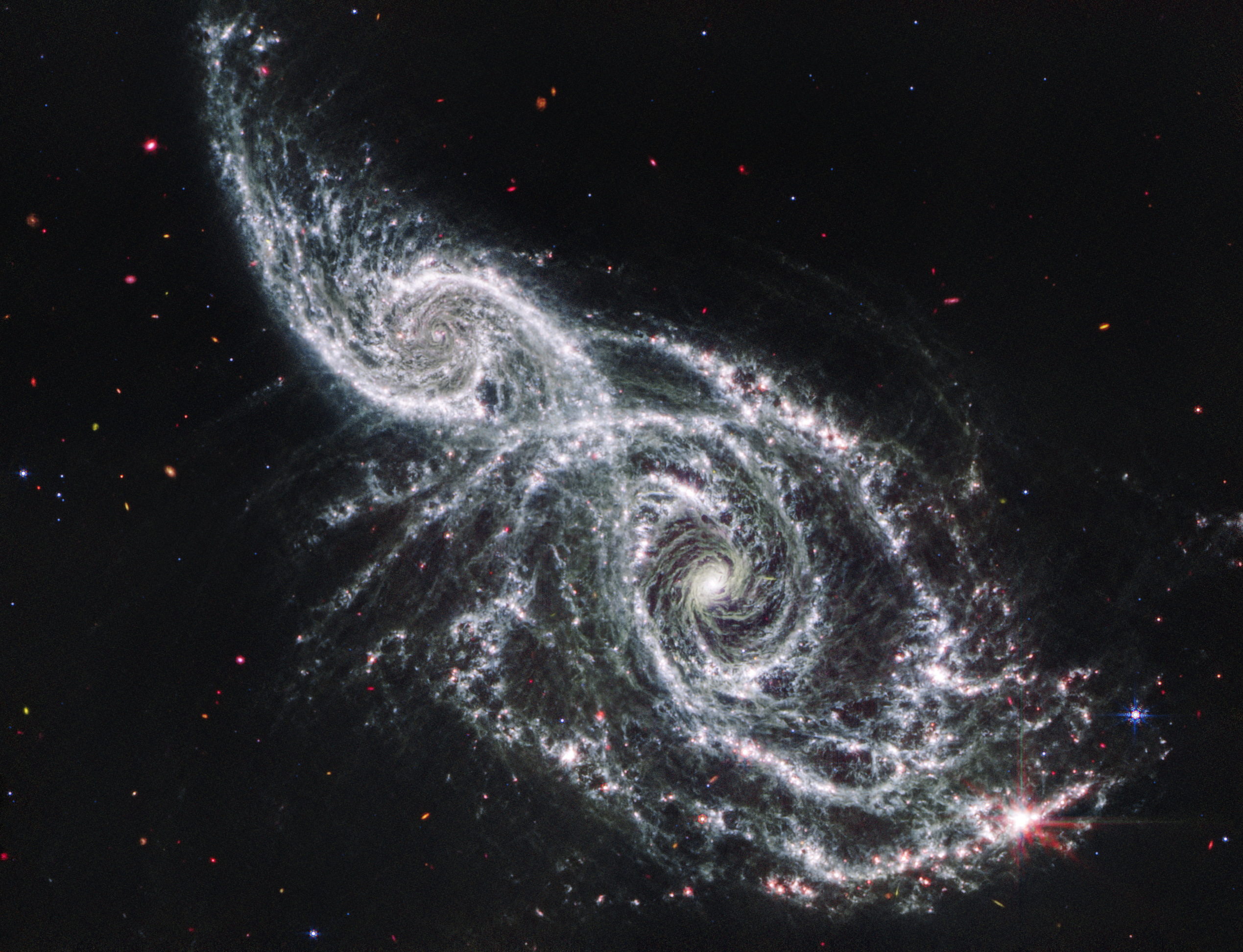
MIRI image of NGC 2207 and IC 2163, taken by the James Webb Space Telescope

The larger spiral, NGC 2207, is classified as an intermediate spiral galaxy exhibiting a weak inner ring structure around the central bar. The smaller companion spiral, IC 2163, is classified as a barred spiral galaxy that also exhibits a weak inner ring and an elongated spiral arm that is likely being stretched by tidal forces with the larger companion. Both galaxies contain a vast amount of dust and gas, and are beginning to exhibit enhanced rates of star formation, as seen in infrared images.

NGC 2207 is in the process of colliding and merging with IC 2163. But unlike the Antennae or the Mice Galaxies, they are still two separate spiral galaxies. They are only in the first step of colliding and merging, with NGC 2207 being in the process of tidally stripping IC 2163. Soon they will collide, probably looking a bit more like the Mice Galaxies. In about a billion years' time they are expected to merge and become an elliptical galaxy or perhaps a disk galaxy.

== Supernovae ==
Five supernovae have been observed in NGC 2207:

- SN 1975A (Type Ia, mag. 14.4) was discovered by Justus R. Dunlap on 15 January 1975.
- SN 1999ec (Type Ib, mag. 17.9) was discovered by the Lick Observatory Supernova Search (LOSS) on 2 October 1999.
- SN 2003H (Type Ib, mag. 17.8) was discovered by LOTOSS (Lick Observatory and Tenagra Observatory Supernova Searches) on 8 January 2003, located halfway between the two galaxies.
- SN 2013ai (Type II, mag. 17.4) was discovered by E. Conseil on 1 March 2013.
- AT 2019eez (Type II, mag. 16.7) was discovered by ASAS-SN on 27 April 2019.

One supernova has been observed in IC 2163:

- SN 2018lab (Type II, mag. 18.493) was discovered by the Distance Less Than 40 Mpc Survey (DLT40) on 29 December 2018.

In addition, one supernova has been observed on the outskirts of the group:

- SN 2010jp (Type IIn, mag. 17.2) was discovered by The CHilean Automatic Supernova sEarch (CHASE) on 11 November 2010.

== See also ==
- Andromeda–Milky Way collision
- Antennae Galaxies
- Arp 299
- NGC 5090 and NGC 5091
- NGC 6872 and IC 4970
- List of NGC objects (2001–3000)
