= Messier 74 =

Face-on spiral galaxy in the constellation Pisces

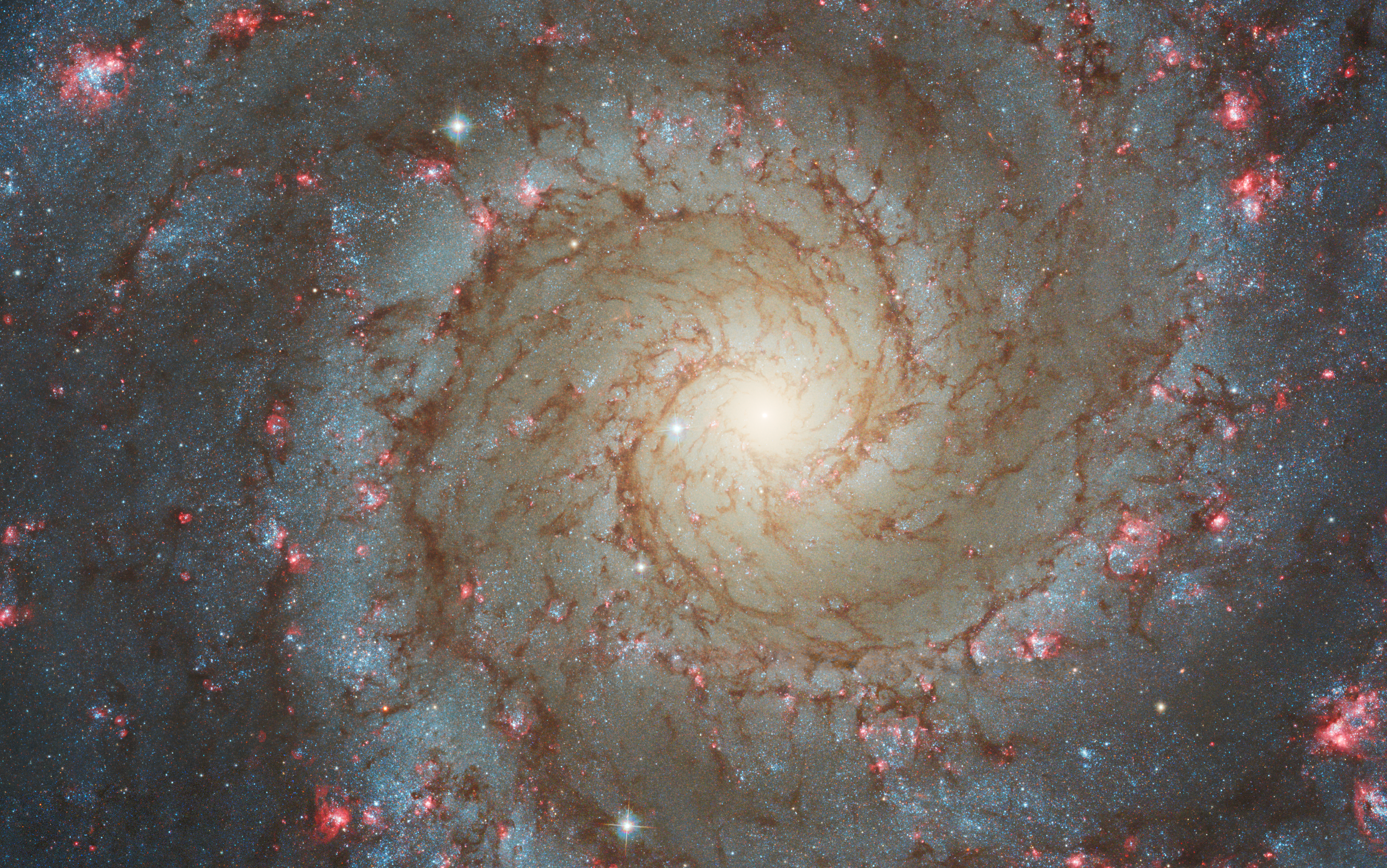
- Spiral galaxy M74 imaged by Hubble Space Telescope

Observation data (J2000 epoch)
- Constellation: Pisces
- Right ascension: 01^{h} 36^{m} 41.7932^{s}
- Declination: +15° 47′ 01.272″
- Redshift: 0.002192±0.00000300
- Heliocentric radial velocity: 657±1 km/s
- Distance: 30 ± 6 Mly
- Apparent magnitude (V): 9.4

Characteristics
- Type: SA(s)c HII
- Number of stars: 100 billion (1×10^{11})
- Size: 85,300 ly (26.16 kpc) (diameter; D_{25} isophote)
- Apparent size (V): 10.5′ × 9.5′

Other designations
- Phantom Galaxy, IRAS 01340+1532, NGC 628, UGC 1149, MCG +03-05-011, PGC 5974, CGCG 460-014

Messier 74 (also known as NGC 628 and Phantom Galaxy) is a large spiral galaxy in the equatorial constellation Pisces. (Note: Its very mild northerly declination means it rises daily (above the horizon) at latitudes above the 75th parallel south) It is about 32 million light-years away from Earth. The galaxy contains two clearly defined spiral arms and is therefore used as an archetypal example of a grand design spiral galaxy. The galaxy's low surface brightness makes it the most difficult Messier object for amateur astronomers to observe. Its relatively large angular (that is, apparent) size and the galaxy's face-on orientation make it an ideal object for professional astronomers who want to study spiral arm structure and spiral density waves. It is estimated that M74 hosts about 100 billion stars.

== Observation history ==
M74 was discovered by Pierre Méchain in 1780. He then communicated his discovery to Charles Messier, who listed the galaxy as M74 in his catalog of permanent celestial objects that should not be confused with transient objects in the sky.

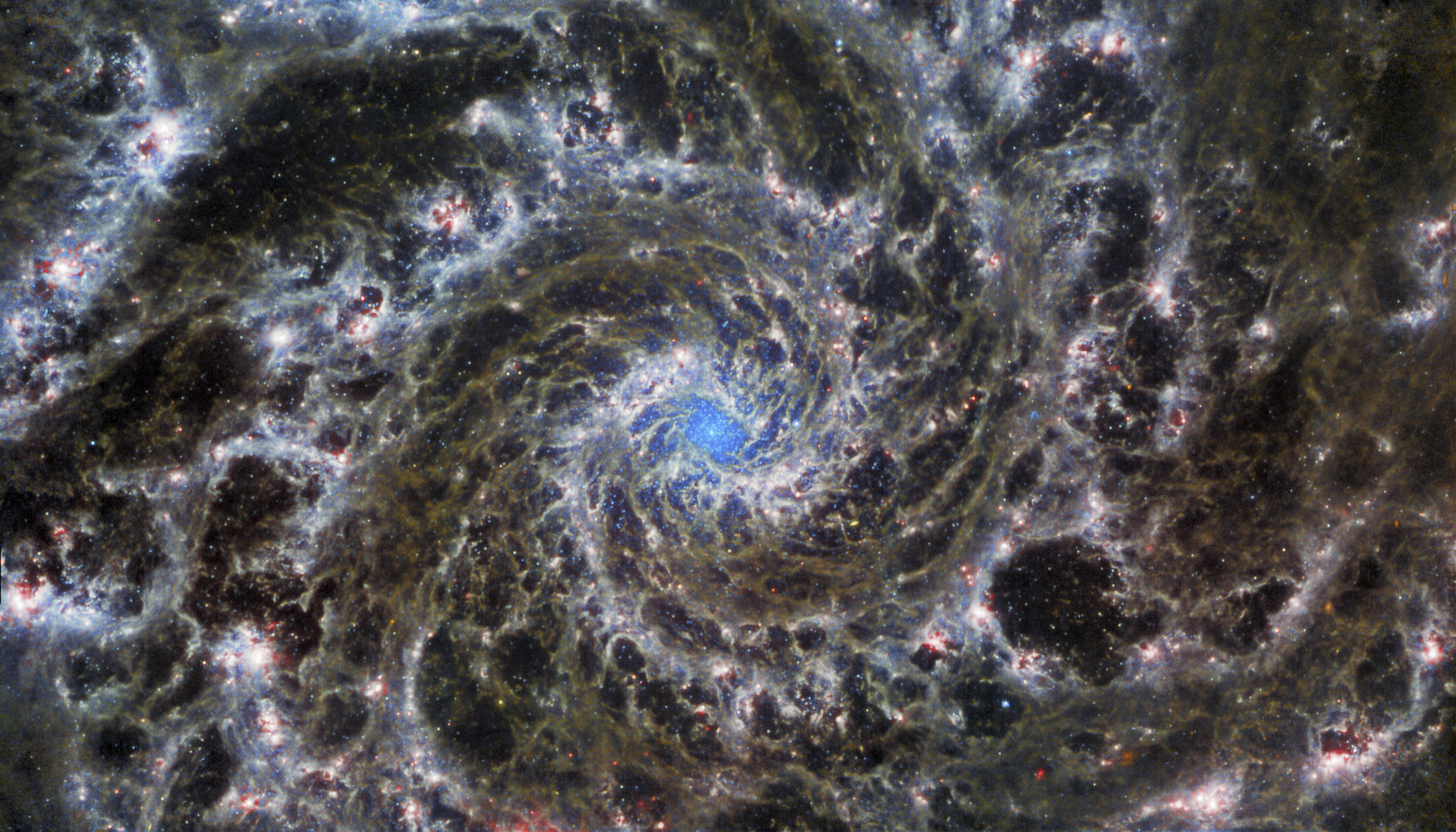
M74 observed by JWST

In July 2022, it was observed by the James Webb Space Telescope.

== Structure ==
M74 has two spiral arms that wind counterclockwise from the galaxy's center. The spiral arms widen as they get farther from M74's center, but one of the arms narrows at the end. The arms deviate slightly from a constant angle.

== Supernovae ==
Three supernovae have been observed in M74:

- SN 2002ap (Type Ic, mag. 14.5) was discovered by Yoji Hirose on 29 January 2002. It was one of few Type Ic supernovae (which denotes hypernovae) recorded within 10 Mpc every century. This explosion has been used to test theories on the origins of others further away and theories on the emission by supernovae of gamma ray bursts. It got as bright as magnitude 12.3, making it the brightest supernova of 2002.
- SN 2003gd (Type II-P, mag. 13.2) was discovered by Robert Evans on 12 June 2003. Type II supernovae have known luminosities, so they can be used to accurately measure distances. The distance measured to M74 using SN 2003gd is 9.6 ± 2.8 Mpc, or 31 ± 9 million ly. For comparison, distances measured using the brightest supergiants are 7.7 ± 1.7 Mpc and 9.6 ± 2.2 Mpc. Ben Sugerman found a "light echo" – a later reflection of the explosion – associated with SN 2003gd. This is one of the few supernovae in which such a reflection has been found. This reflection appears to be from dust in a sheet-like cloud that lies in front of the supernova, and it can be used to determine the composition of the interstellar dust.
- SN 2013ej (Type II-P, mag. 13.5) was discovered by the Lick Observatory Supernova Search (LOSS) on 25 July 2013. It was bright as 10th magnitude when viewed from the surface of Earth, so it was visible from almost all modern telescopes in a good night sky.

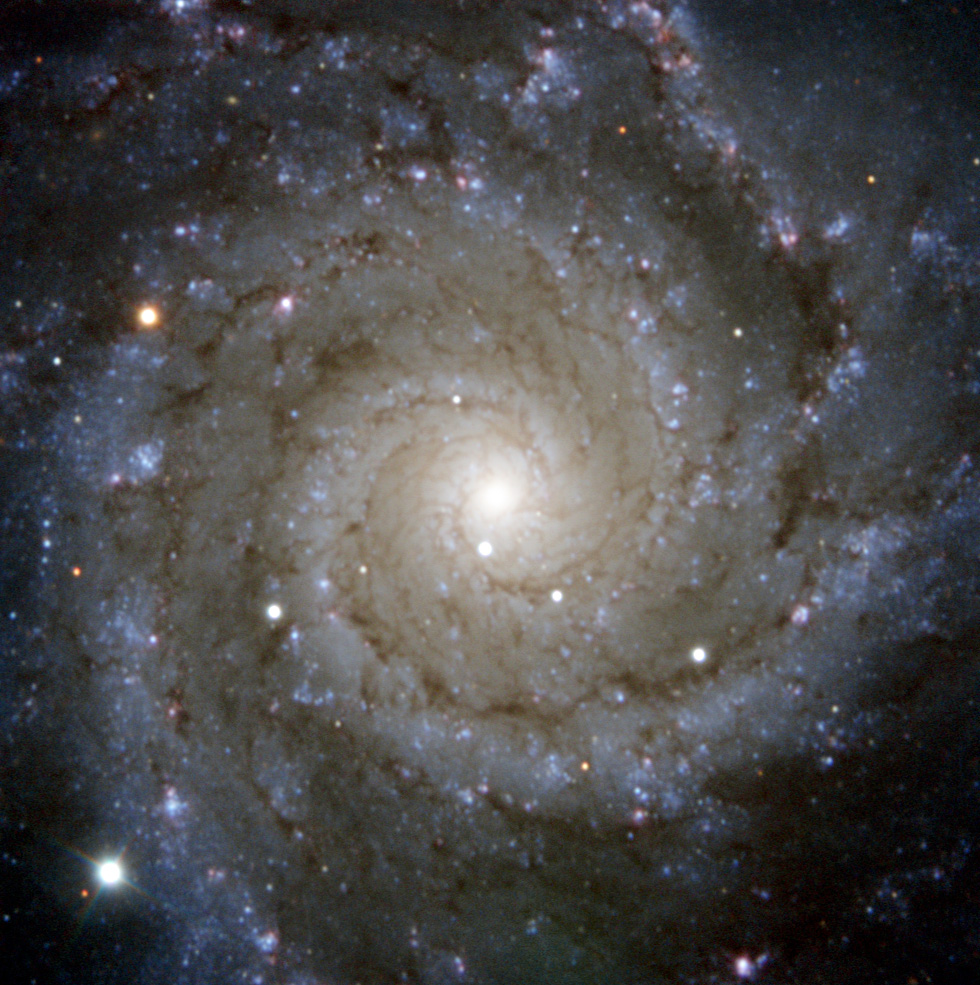
Image of M74 during Supernova SN 2013ej (in the bottom left corner is the SN 2013ej)

In addition to these supernovae, the astronomical transient AT 2019krl was discovered by Anna Ho on 6 July 2019, and classified as either a Type IIn supernova or an LBV in outburst. Later analysis argued that it was consistent with known examples of giant LBV eruptions and SN 2008S-like objects.

== Galaxy group ==
This is the brightest member of the M74 Group, a group of 5 to 7 galaxies that also includes the peculiar spiral galaxy NGC 660 and a few irregular galaxies. Different group membership identification methods (ranging from a clear, to likely, to perhaps historic gravitational tie) identify several objects of the group in common, and a few galaxies whose exact status within such groupings is currently uncertain.

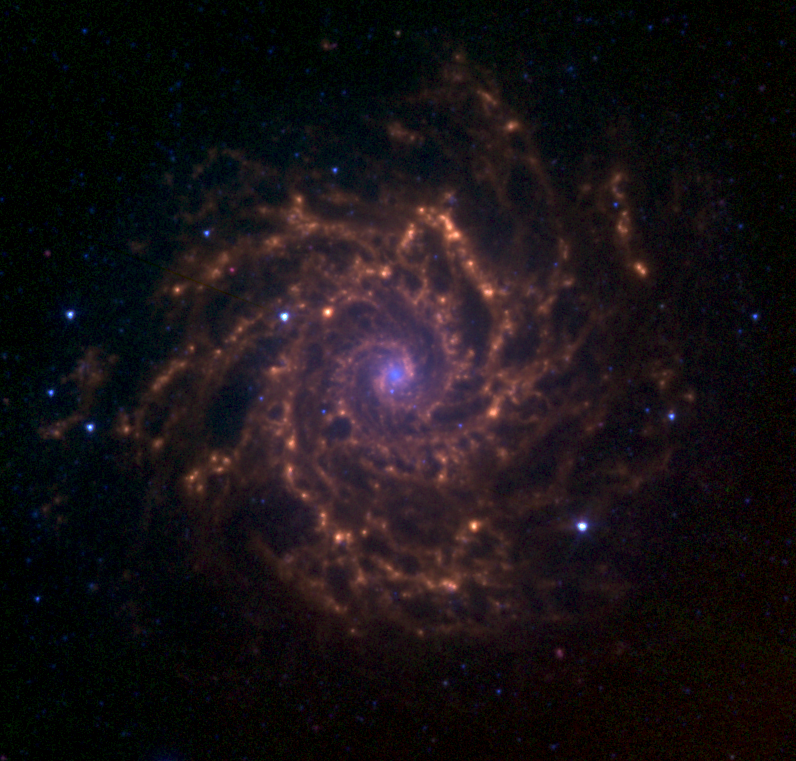
M74 as observed with the Spitzer Space Telescope as part of the Spitzer Infrared Nearby Galaxy Survey. The blue colors represent the 3.6 micrometre emission from stars. The green and red colors represent the 5.8 and 8.0 micrometre emission from polycyclic aromatic hydrocarbons and possibly dust.

== Suspected black hole ==
In 2005 (Note: On March 22) the Chandra X-ray Observatory announced its observation of an ultraluminous X-ray source (ULX) in M74, radiating more X-ray power than a neutron star, in periodic intervals of around two hours. It has an estimated mass of 10000 M_{☉}. This is an indicator of an intermediate-mass black hole. This would be a rather uncommon class, in between in size of stellar black holes and the massive black holes theorized to be in the center of many galaxies. Such an object is believed to form from lesser ("stellar") black holes within a star cluster. The source has been given identification number CXOU J013651.1+154547.

== Amateur astronomy observation ==
Messier 74 is 1.5° east-northeast of Eta Piscium. This galaxy has the second-lowest Earth-surface brightness of any Messier object. (M101 has the lowest.) It requires a good night sky. This galaxy may be best viewed under low magnification; when highly magnified, the diffuse emission becomes more extended and appears too faint to be seen by many people. Additionally, M74 may be more easily seen when using averted vision when the eyes are fully dark adapted.

== See also ==
- List of Messier objects
- NGC 3184 – a similar face-on spiral galaxy
- Messier 101 – a similar face-on spiral galaxy
- Whirlpool Galaxy – a well-known face-on spiral galaxy
