= Tidal stripping =

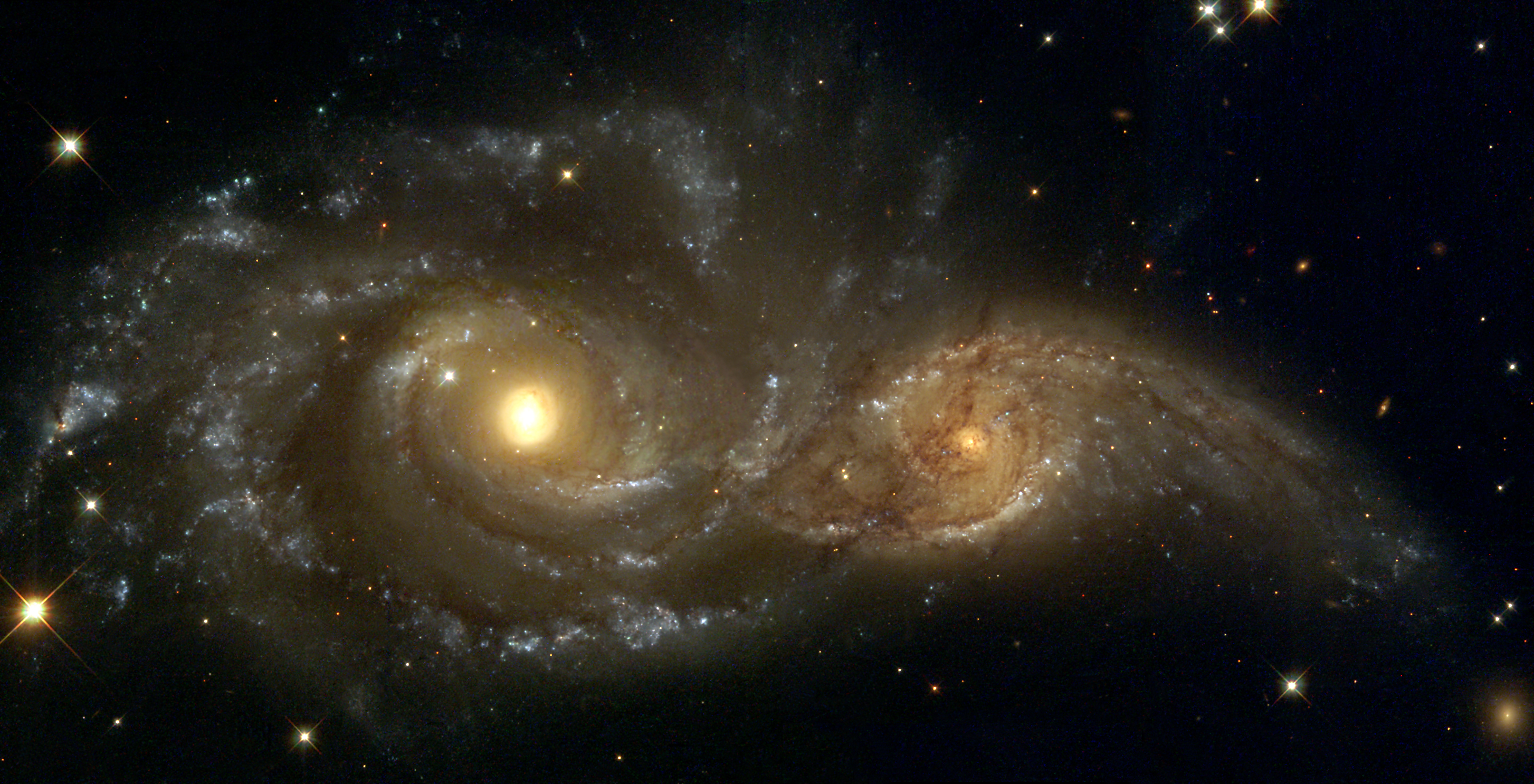
NGC 2207 (left) tidally stripping IC 2163 (right).

Tidal stripping is a process in which the difference in gravitational attraction between two bodies results in the removal or stripping of stars and interstellar medium from the smaller body by the stronger tidal forces present in the larger body.

The phenomena is commonly observed in interacting galaxies, wherein the gravitational tidal forces of a galaxy of greater mass strips matter from a smaller galaxy or other body.

An example of this scenario is the interacting pair of galaxies NGC 2207 and IC 2163, which are currently in the process of tidal stripping.

== See also ==
- Galactic tide
- Interacting galaxy
- Galactic ram pressure stripping
