= Katzman Automatic Imaging Telescope =

Automated telescope

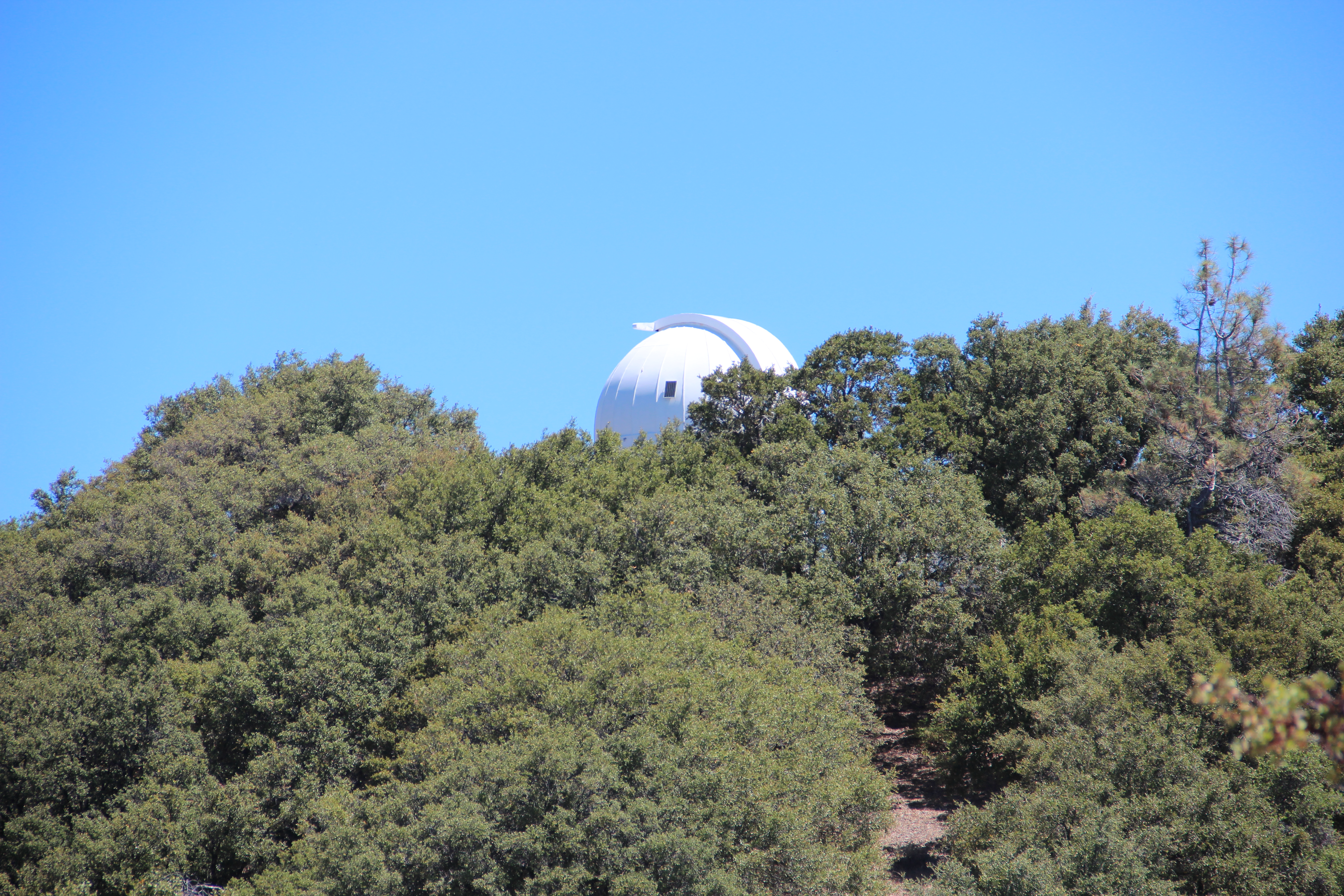
- The Katzman Automatic Imaging Telescope dome
- Alternative names: KAIT
- Location(s): Santa Clara County, California, Pacific States Region
- Coordinates: 37°20′36″N 121°38′05″W
- First light: 1996
- Diameter: 76 cm (2 ft 6 in)
- Website: www.ucolick.org/public/telescopes/kait.html,%20https://www.ucolick.org/main/science/telescopes/kait.html
- Location of Katzman Automatic Imaging Telescope
- Related media on Commons

The Katzman Automatic Imaging Telescope (KAIT) is an automated telescope used in the search for supernovae.

The telescope had a first light in 1998, and is a noted robotic telescope. It had first recorded data in August 1996, and was formally dedicated late that year. It was used for the Lick Observatory Supernova Search.

The KAIT is a computer-controlled reflecting telescope with a 76 cm mirror and a CCD camera to take pictures. It is located at the Lick Observatory near San Jose, California.

KAIT can take close to 100 images per hour and observe about 1000 galaxies a night.

The Katzman Automatic Imaging Telescope is a robotic telescope designed to look for supernova. The telescope uses 76 cm (30 inch) diameter mirror that feeds a CCD imager with 20 slot filter wheel. The telescope is also supported by an electronic weather station, that can feed data to the robotic telescope control system. Several computers run software that controls the telescope and take in the data from the sensors.

The telescope's development was funded by the NSF at private donors since 1989, turning 30-inch (~760 mm) telescope in a computer controlled super nova huntress. The telescope can also monitor the brightness of variable stars.

== Observations and research ==
KAIT discovered its first supernova in 1997, SN 1997bs. The next year (1998) twenty supernova were found after improvements to the telescope, and in 1999 forty supernova were discovered.

The telescope has been noted for discovering the supernova SN 1999em. This super nova was in the spiral galaxy NGC 1637, and was observed later by telescope such as the VLT (4x8.2m).

Another example of KAIT discovery was SN 1999ec, a type Ib supernova that was discovered in the interacting galaxy NGC 2207 on October 2, 1999.

In 2011, KAIT was one of six telescopes used for the Lick AGN Monitoring Project.

Between 1998 and 2013, KAIT had discovered 900 supernova. In 2013, the supernova 2013ej was discovered by KAIT in the galaxy Messier 74; it was noted for being as bright as 10th magnitude.

In 2014, KAIT helped determine the age of a supernova found in the galaxy M83, because it had images of that region of the sky from just a few days prior to its discovery, establishing it had not brightened at that time.

In 2016, KAIT spotted the super nova SN 2016coj in NGC 4125, thought to be a Type Ia supernova.

In 2019, KAIT was one of the telescopes whose data was used in a study on Blazars.

== Discoveries ==
Year	Supernovae	Novae	Dwarf Novae	Comets
1998	20	4	2	1
1999	40	1	7	1
2000	38	2	0	0
2001	68	3	0	0
2002	82	2	0	0
2003	95	5	0	0
2004	83	0	0	0
2005	82	0	0	0
2006	84	0	0	0
2007	69	0	0	0
2008	77	0	0	0
2009	54	0	0	0
2010	51	0	0	0

== See also ==
- List of observatories
- List of telescope types
