= Galaxy cluster =

Astronomical structure

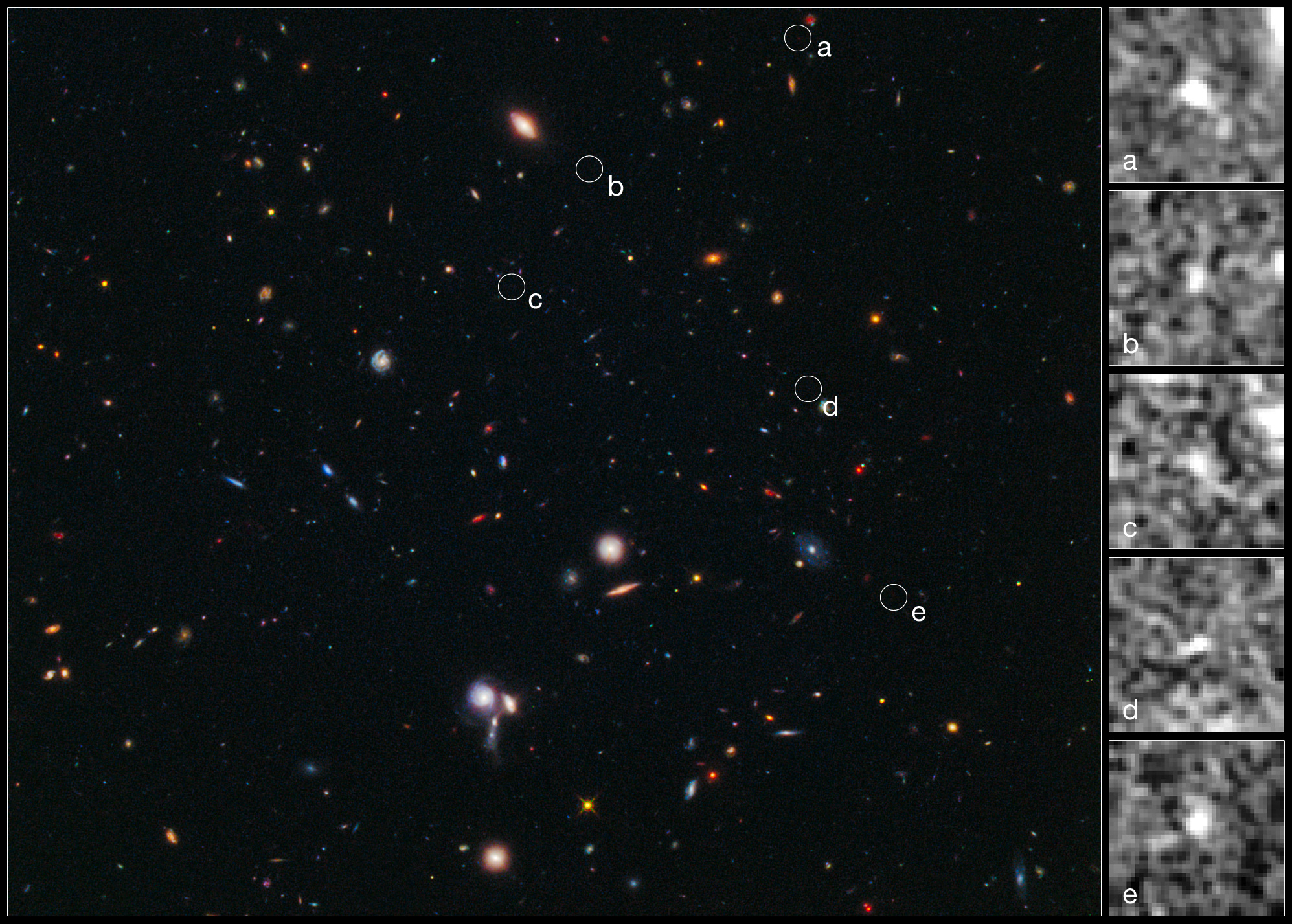
Composite image of BoRG-58, a group of 5 galaxies clustered together just 600 million years after the Universe's birth

A galaxy cluster, or a cluster of galaxies, is a structure that consists of anywhere from hundreds to thousands of galaxies that are bound together by gravity, with typical masses ranging from 10^{14} to 10^{15} solar masses (M_{☉}). Clusters consist of galaxies, heated gas, and dark matter. They are the biggest known gravitationally bound structures in the universe. They were believed to be the largest known structures in the universe until the 1980s, when superclusters were discovered. Small aggregates of galaxies are referred to as galaxy groups rather than clusters of galaxies. Together, galaxy groups and clusters form superclusters.

== Basic properties ==
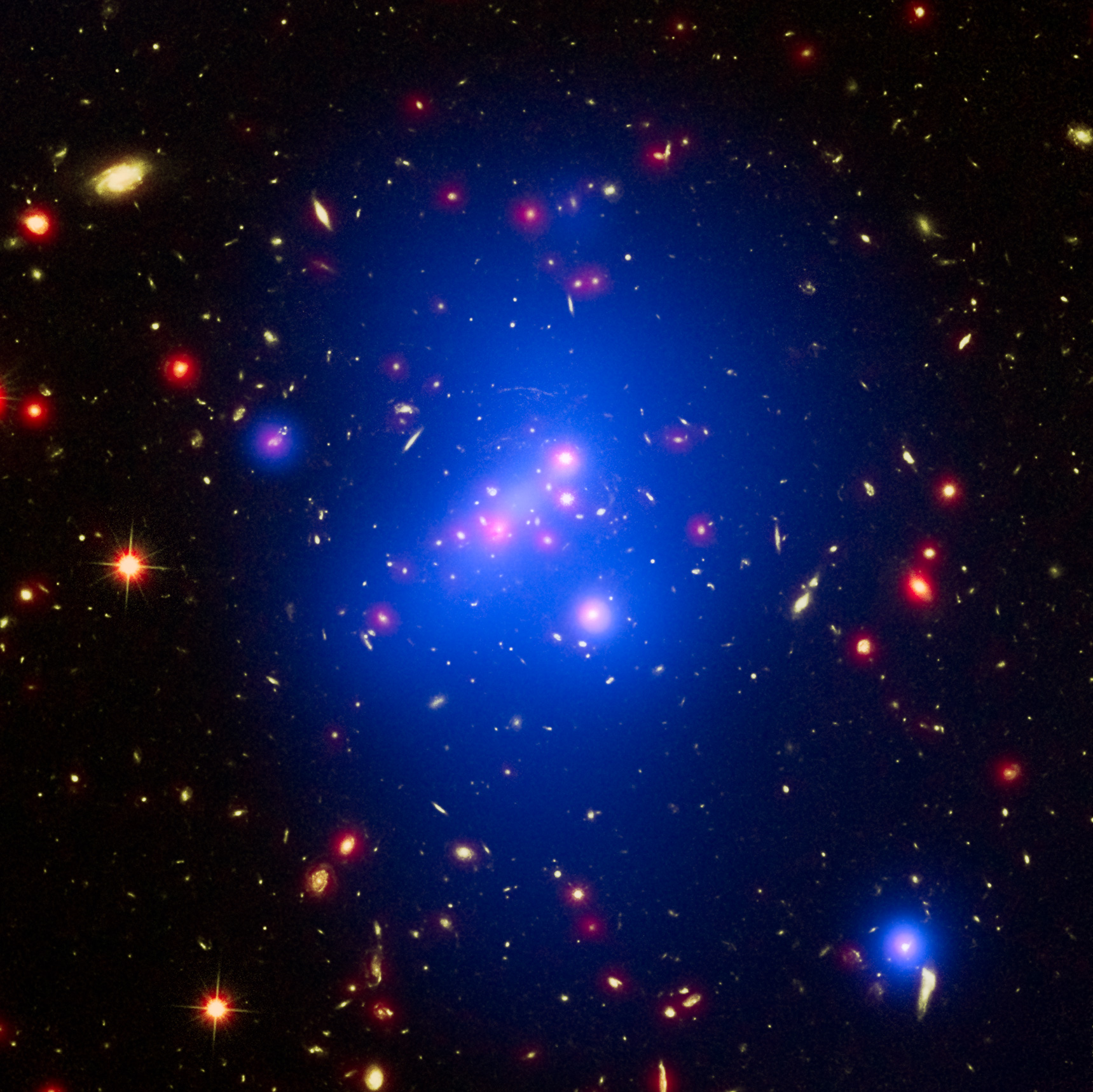
Galaxy cluster IDCS J1426 is located 10 billion light-years from Earth and has the mass of almost 500 trillion suns (multi-wavelength image: X-rays in blue, visible light in green, and infrared light in red).

Galaxy clusters typically have the following properties:

- They contain 100 to 1,000 galaxies, hot X-ray emitting gas and large amounts of dark matter. Details are described in the "Composition" section.
- They have total masses of 10^{14} to 10^{15} solar masses.
- They typically have diameters from 1 to 5 Mpc (see 10^{23} m for distance comparisons).
- The spread of velocities for the individual galaxies is about 800–1000 km/s.

== Composition ==
Galaxy clusters have three main components. Galaxies themselves only make up a small fraction of clusters, although they are the only component we can detect in the visible spectrum. The heated gas of the intracluster medium (ICM) has a peak temperature between 30 and 100 million degrees Celsius. Dark matter makes up the majority of the mass of galaxy clusters, but cannot be detected optically.

Component	Mass fraction	Description
Galaxies	1%	In optical observations, only galaxies are visible
Intergalactic gas in intracluster medium	9%	Plasma between the galaxies at high temperature and emit x-ray radiation by thermal bremsstrahlung
Dark matter	90%	Most massive component but cannot be detected optically and is inferred through gravitational interactions

== Cluster formation and evolution ==
As galaxy clusters form, massive amounts of energy are released due to shock waves, the heating of gas, and galaxy interactions. Gas collides with existing material which generates shock waves, heating it to tens of millions of degrees and producing X-ray emissions. Galaxy evolution within the cluster is governed by interactions between galaxies, such as galaxy mergers, and gas stripping.

== Classification ==
There are many classification systems for galaxy clusters, based on characteristics such as shape symmetry, X-ray luminosity, and dominant galaxy type. The Bautz-Morgan classification sorts clusters into types I, II, and III based on the relative brightness of their galaxies–type I with greatest contrast and type III with the least.

== As measuring instruments ==
=== Gravitational redshift ===
Galaxy clusters have been used by Radek Wojtak from the Niels Bohr Institute at the University of Copenhagen to test predictions of general relativity: energy loss from light escaping a gravitational field. Photons emitted from the center of a galaxy cluster should lose more energy than photons coming from the edge of the cluster because gravity is stronger in the center. Light emitted from the center of a cluster has a longer wavelength than light coming from the edge. This effect is known as gravitational redshift. Using the data collected from 8000 galaxy clusters, Wojtak was able to study the properties of gravitational redshift for the distribution of galaxies in clusters. He found that the light from the clusters was redshifted in proportion to the distance from the center of the cluster as predicted by general relativity. The result also strongly supports the Lambda-Cold Dark Matter model of the Universe, according to which most of the cosmos is made up of Dark Matter that does not interact with matter.

=== Gravitational lensing ===
Galaxy clusters are also used for their strong gravitational potential as gravitational lenses to boost the reach of telescopes. The gravitational lensing provided by these clusters allows for the observation of distant galaxies during their early stages that would otherwise be unable to be detected. The gravitational distortion of space-time occurs near massive galaxy clusters and bends the path of photons to create a cosmic magnifying glass. This can be done with photons of any wavelength from the optical to the X-ray band. The latter is more difficult, because galaxy clusters emit a lot of X-rays. However, X-ray emission may still be detected when combining X-ray data to optical data. One particular case is the use of the Phoenix galaxy cluster to observe a dwarf galaxy in its early high energy stages of star formation.

== Notable galaxy clusters ==
The Laniakea Supercluster with many galaxy clusters

Notable galaxy clusters in the relatively nearby universe include the Virgo Cluster, Fornax Cluster, Hercules Cluster, and the Coma Cluster. A very large aggregation of galaxies known as the Great Attractor, dominated by the Norma Cluster, is massive enough to affect the local expansion of the Universe. Notable galaxy clusters in the distant, high-redshift universe include SPT-CL J0546-5345 and SPT-CL J2106-5844, the most massive galaxy clusters found in the early Universe. In the last few decades, they are also found to be relevant sites of particle acceleration, a feature that has been discovered by observing non-thermal diffuse radio emissions, such as radio halos and radio relics. Using the Chandra X-ray Observatory, structures such as cold fronts and shock waves have also been found in many galaxy clusters.

Cluster	Notes
Virgo Cluster	The nearest massive galaxy cluster
Norma Cluster	The cluster at the heart of the Great Attractor
Bullet Cluster	A cluster merger with the first observed separation between dark matter and normal matter
This lists some of the most notable clusters; for more clusters, see the list article.

== In the early Universe ==
Galaxy clusters start as protoclusters. These are massive concentrations of plasma gas, and galaxies are still being formed. They have yet to undergo collapse and form a gravitationally bound cluster. In theory, a protocluster can be identified from its over-density of dark matter as long as baryonic tracers are available. They form extended structures that contain multiple star-forming galaxies, forming perhaps the dominant population of higher density features at high redshifts. Protoclusters may have played an important role in the reionization of the cosmos.

Combined observational data from the James Webb Space Telescope, Chandra X-ray Observatory and the Atacama Large Millimeter Array suggests that these protoclusters, or precursor clusters, like JADES-ID1 and SPT2349-56, were being formed very early in the evolution of the universe.

== Gallery ==
Left: Image by the Hubble Space Telescope (2017) Right: Image by the James Webb Space Telescope (2022)
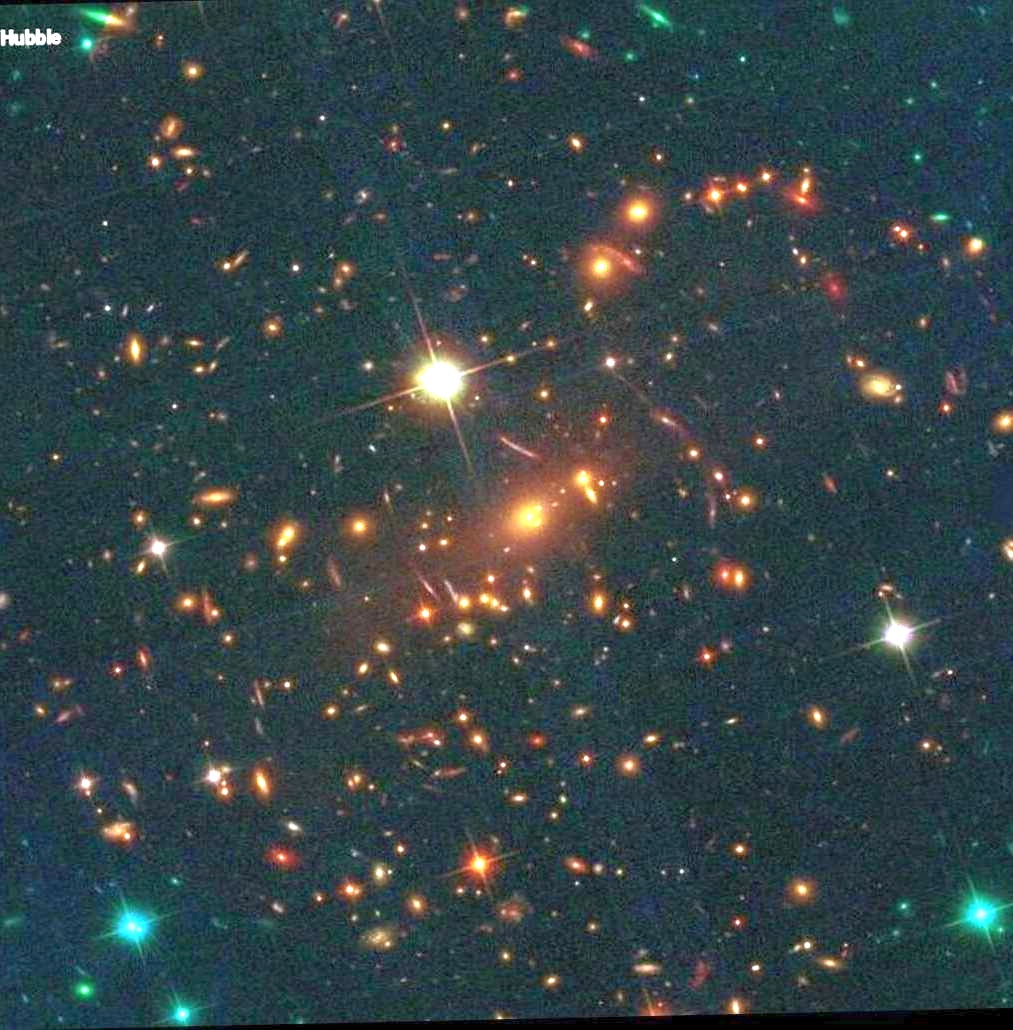
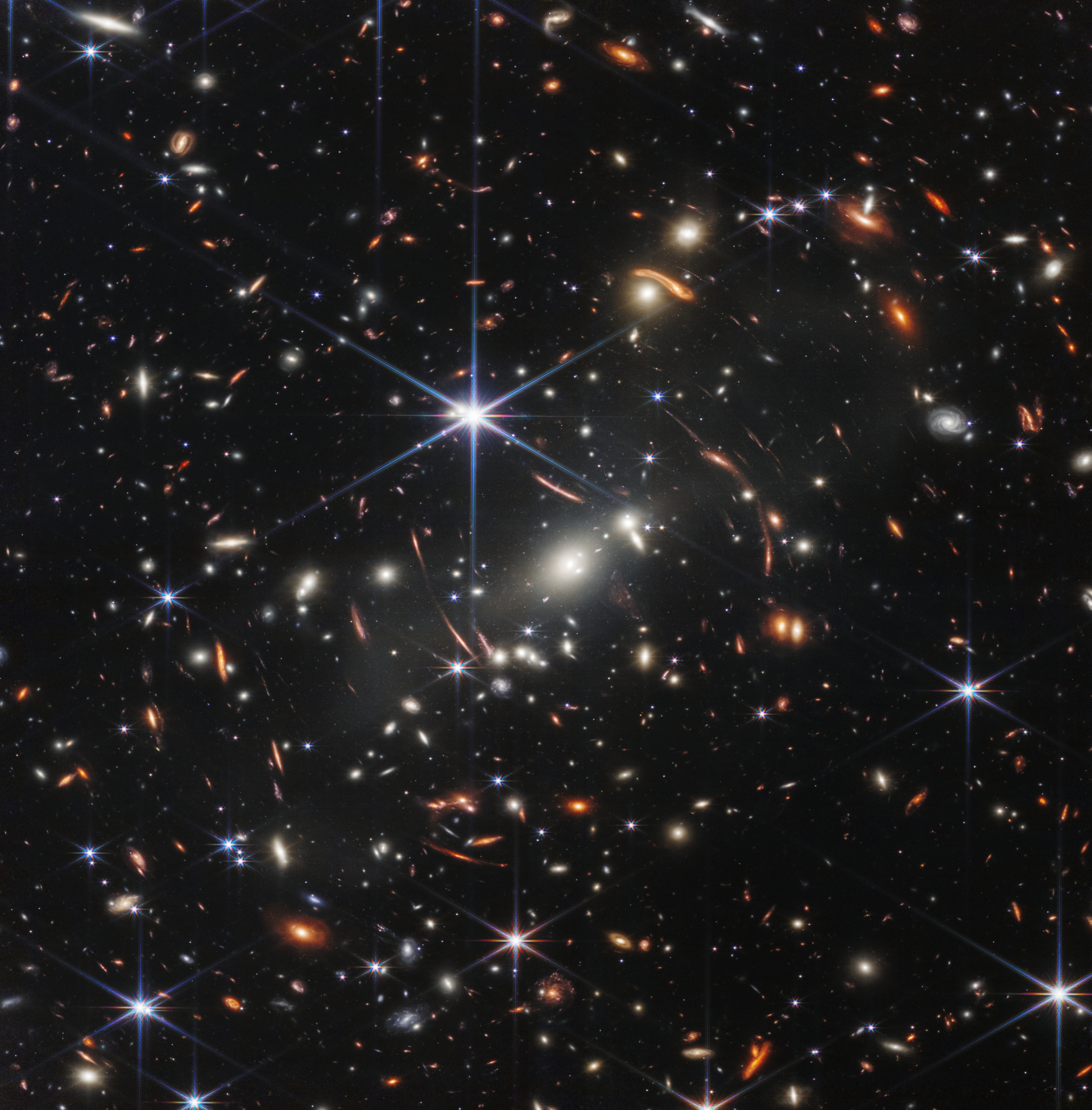
Deep Field – Galaxy cluster SMACS J0723.3-7327.
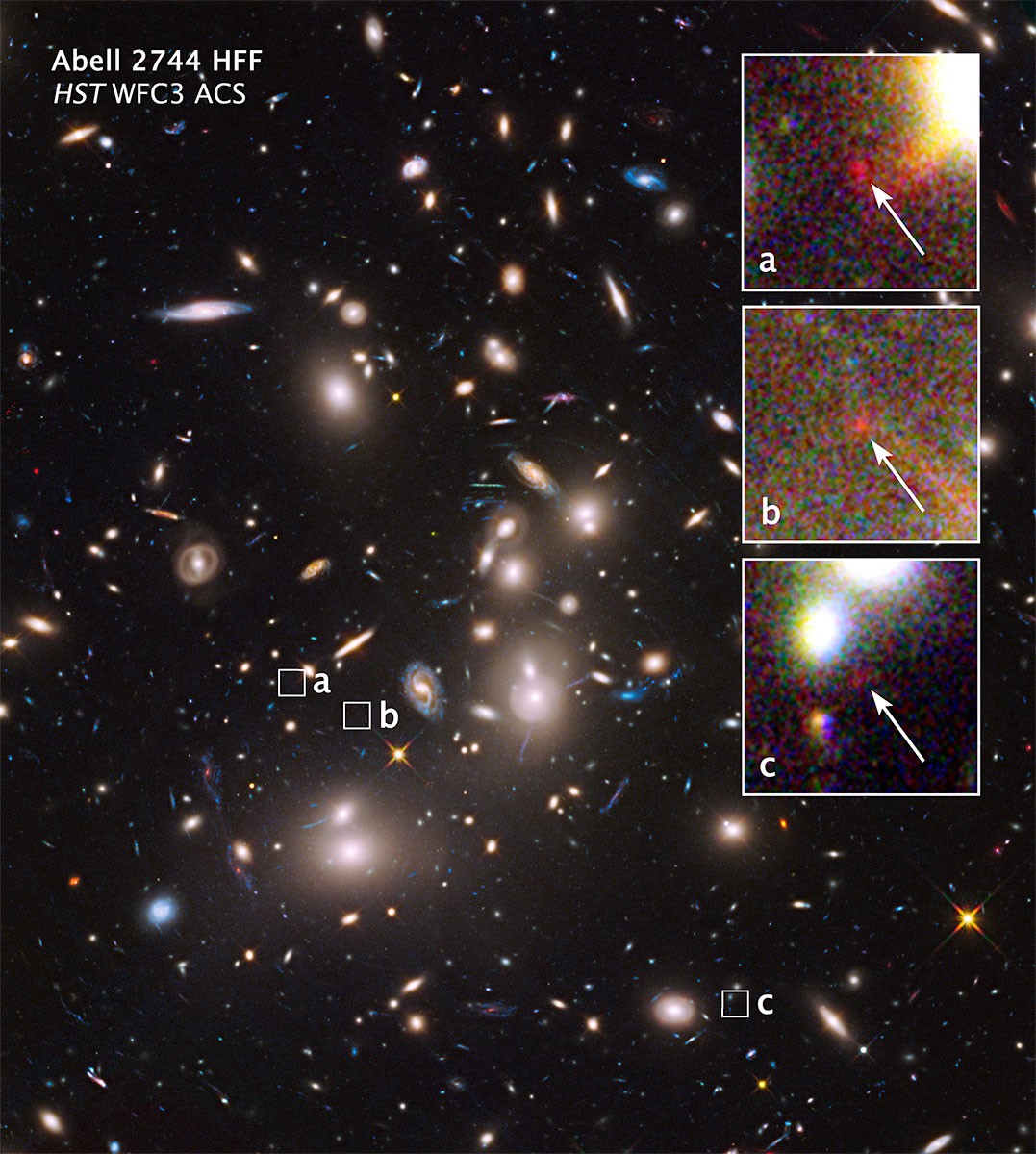
Abell 2744 galaxy cluster – extremely distant galaxies revealed by gravitational lensing (16 October 2014).

=== Images ===
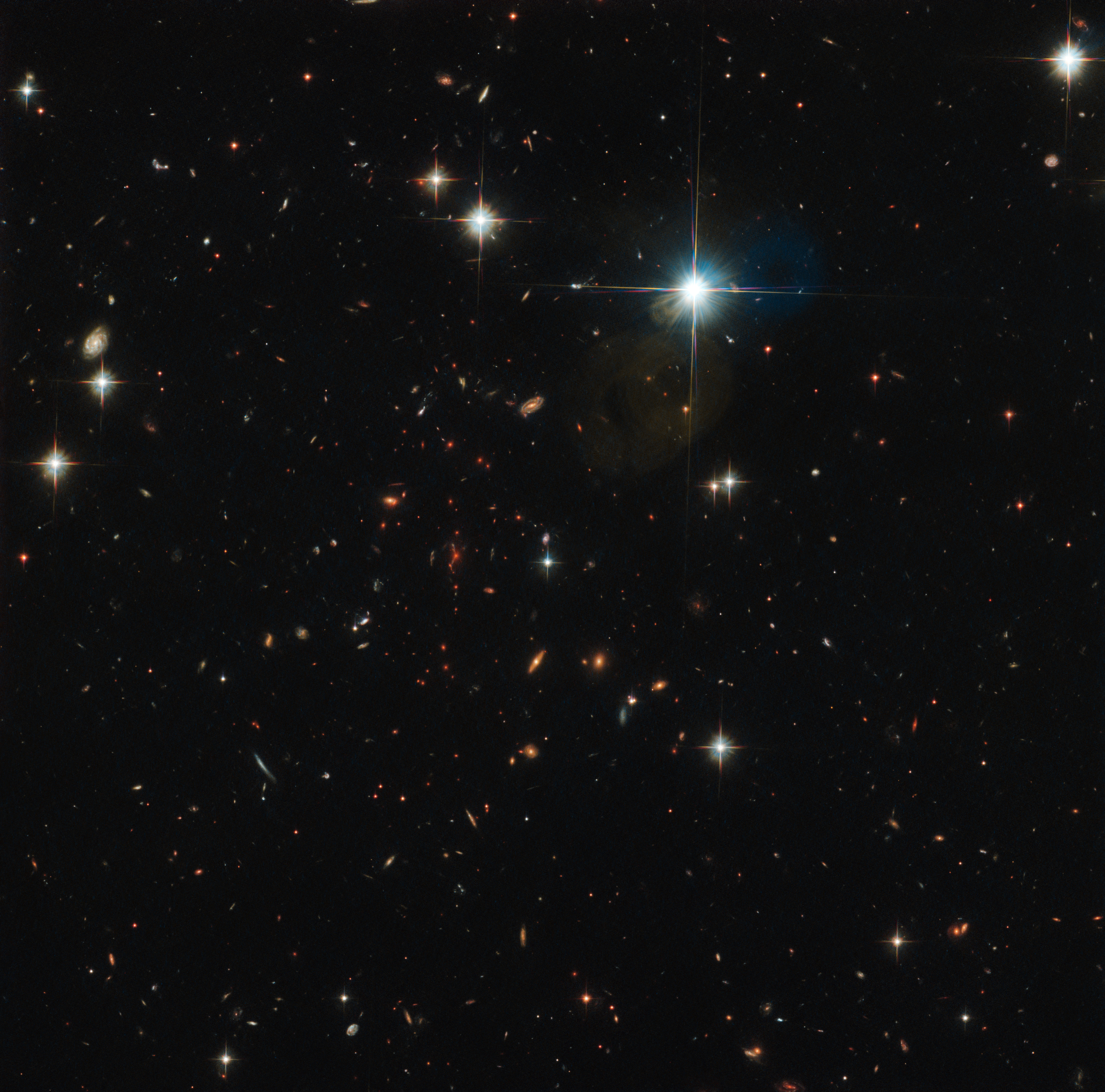
Galaxy cluster SPT-CL J0615-5746.

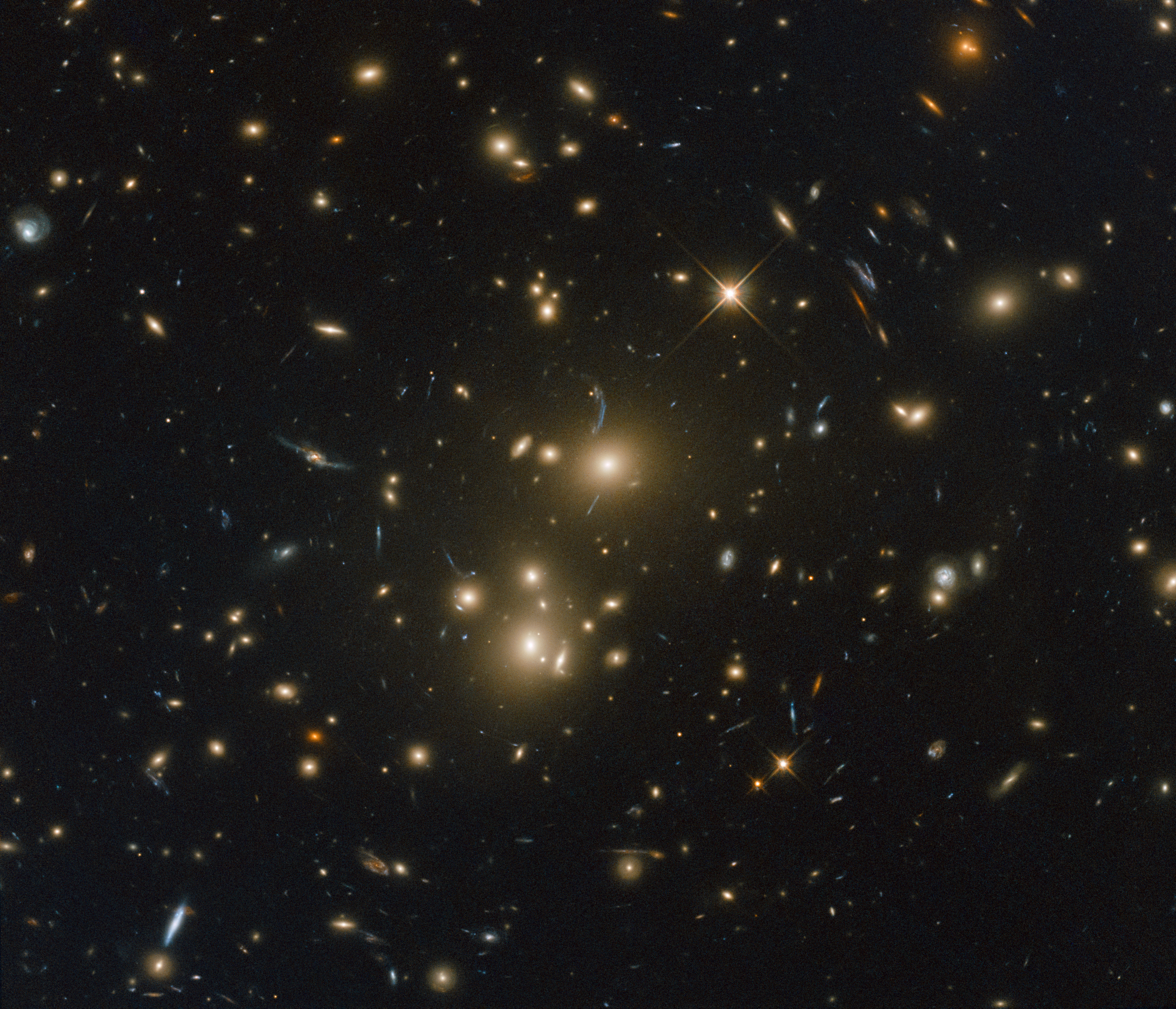
Galaxy cluster RXC J0232.2-4420.

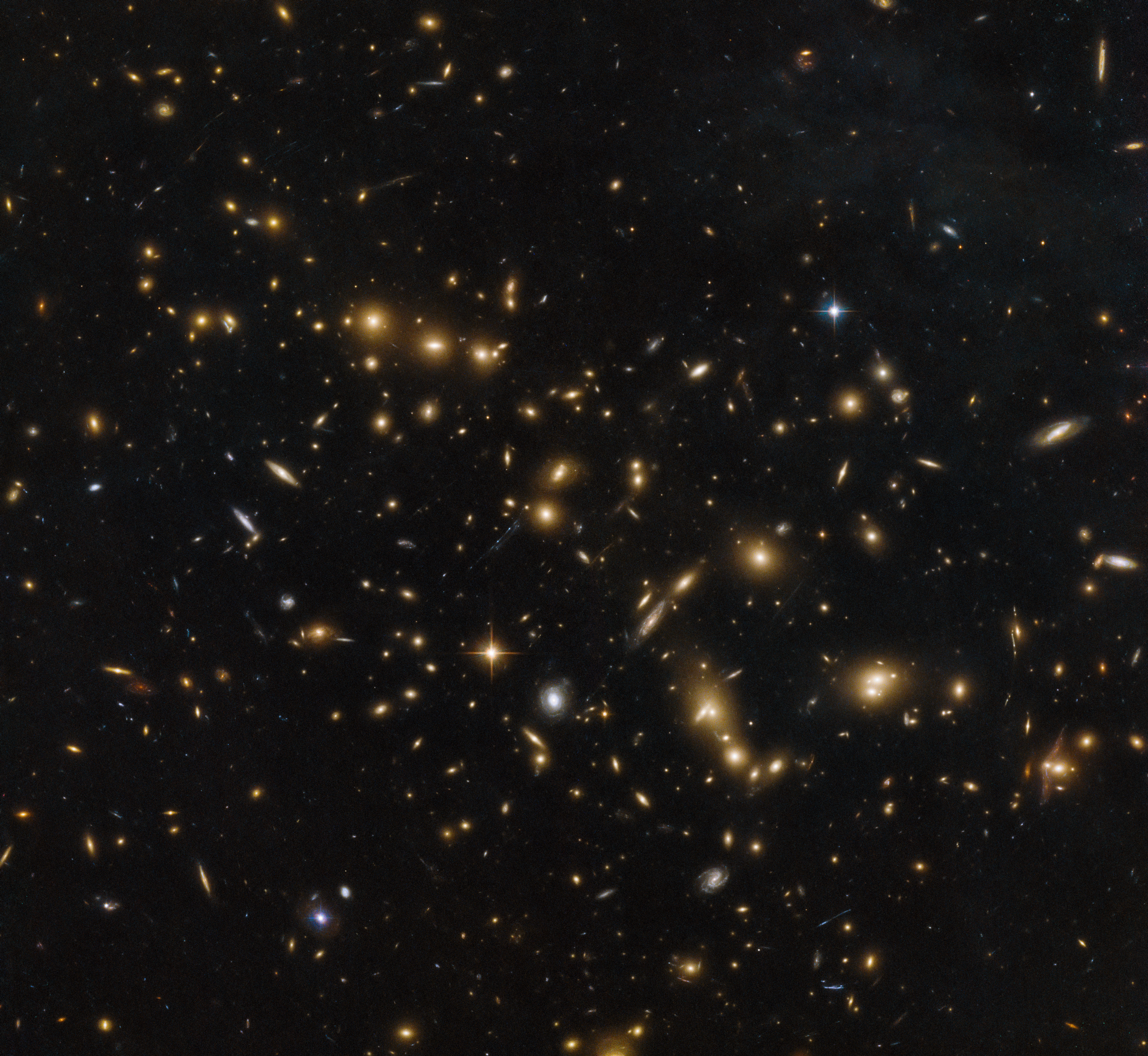
Galaxy cluster RXC J0032.1+1808 as part of the RELICS program.

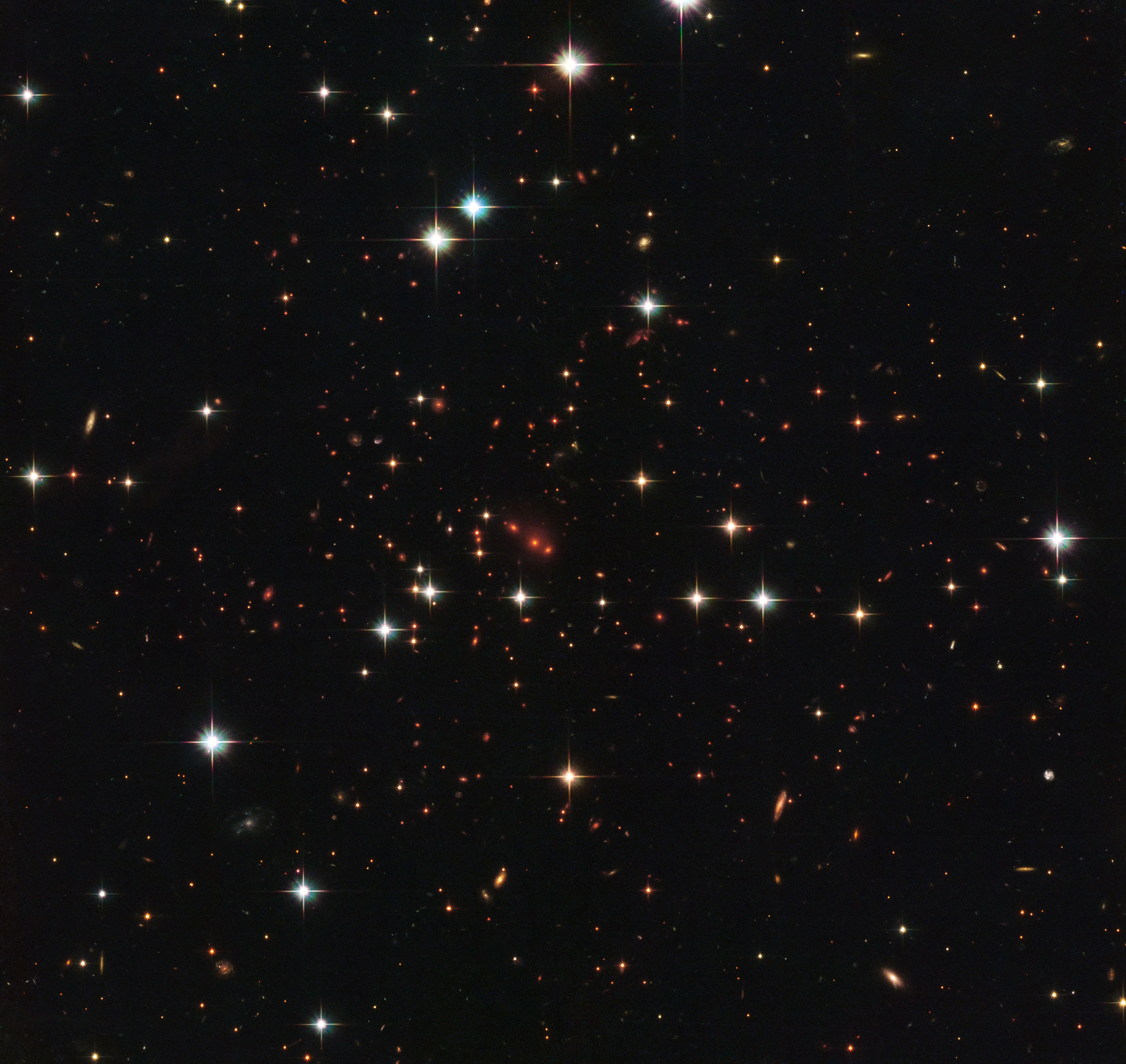
Massive galaxy cluster PSZ2 G138.61-10.84 is about six billion light-years away.

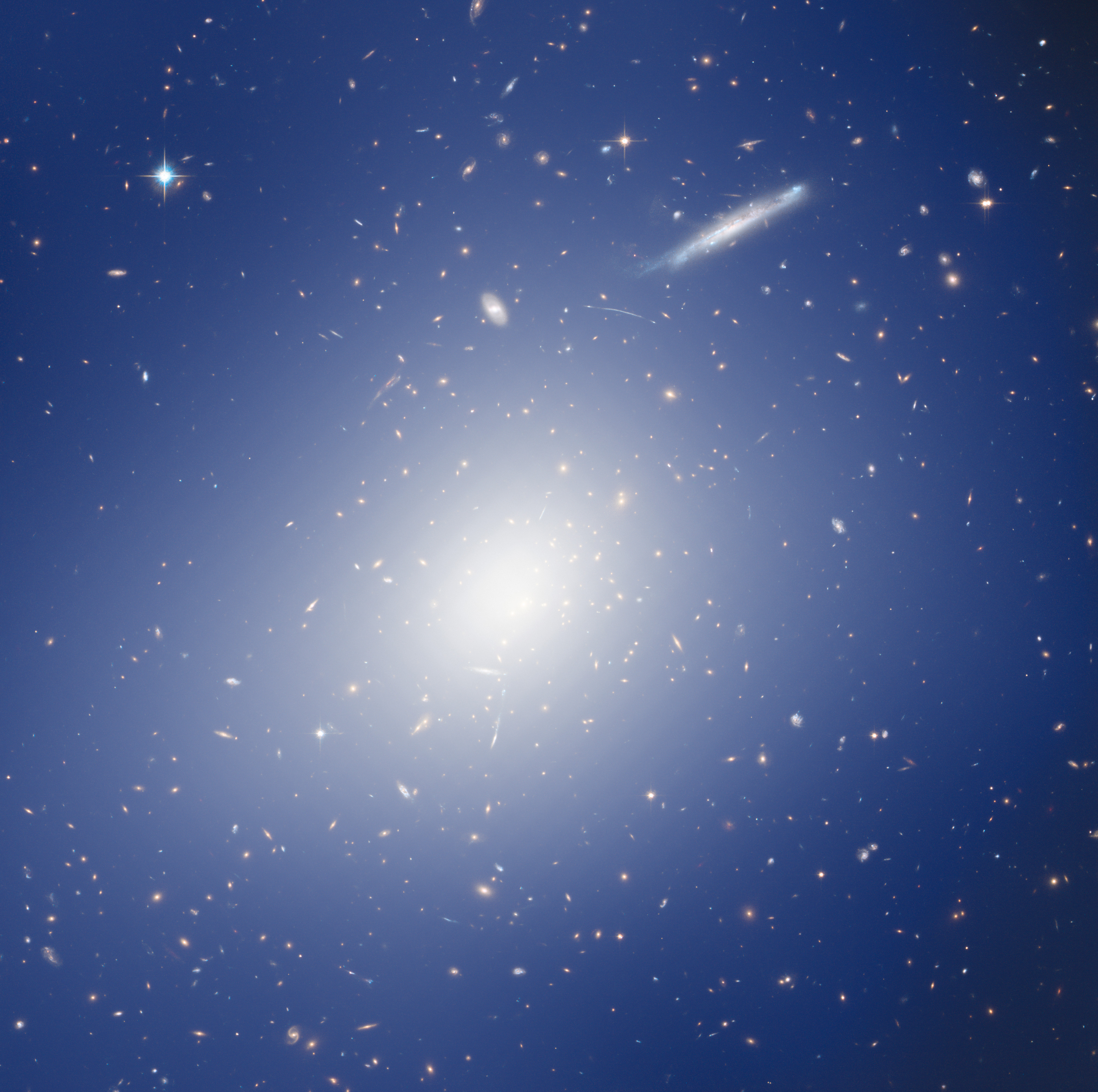
HAWK-I and Hubble explore RCS2 J2327 cluster with the mass of two quadrillion Suns.

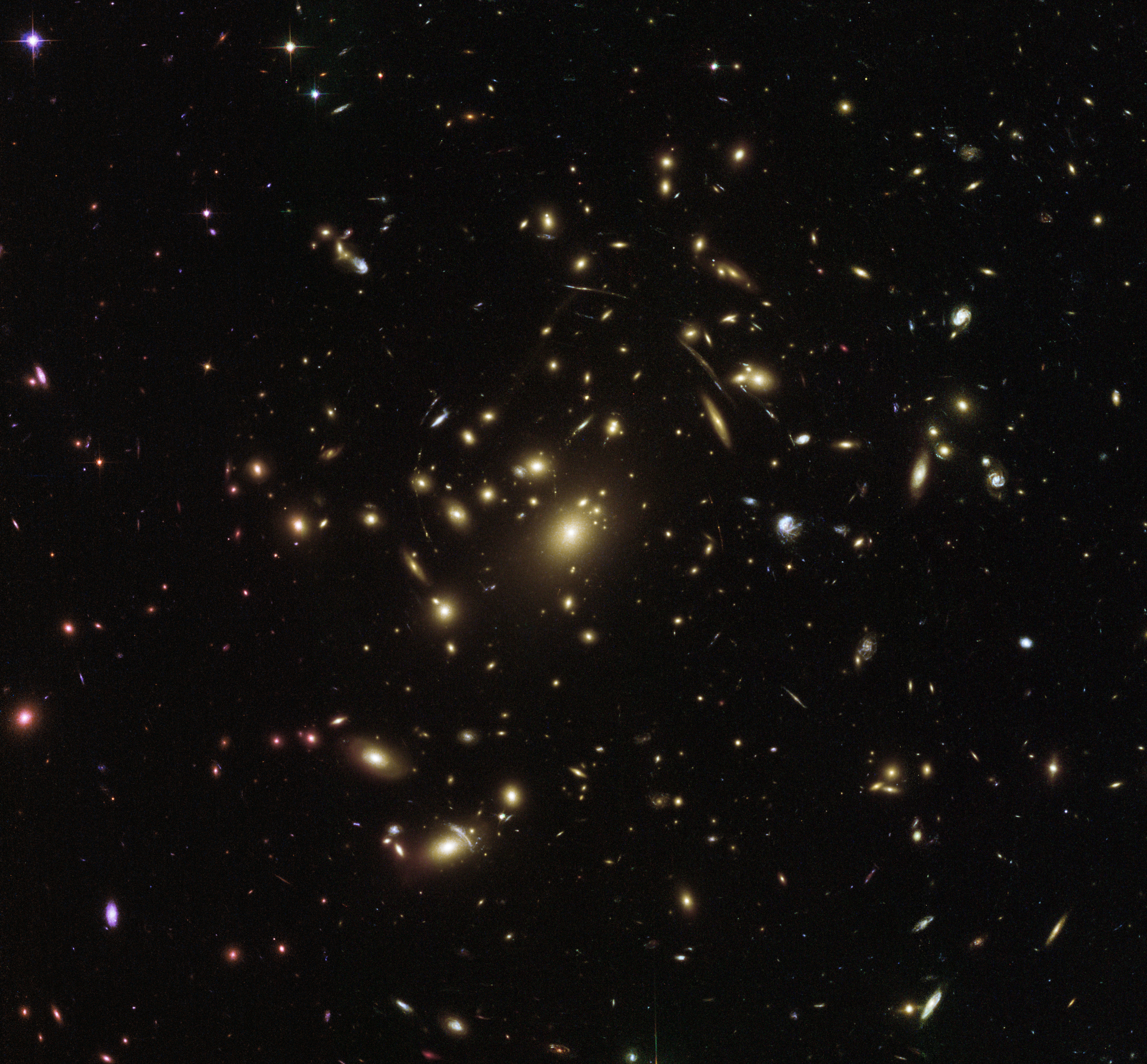
Abell 2537 is useful in probing cosmic phenomena like dark matter and dark energy.

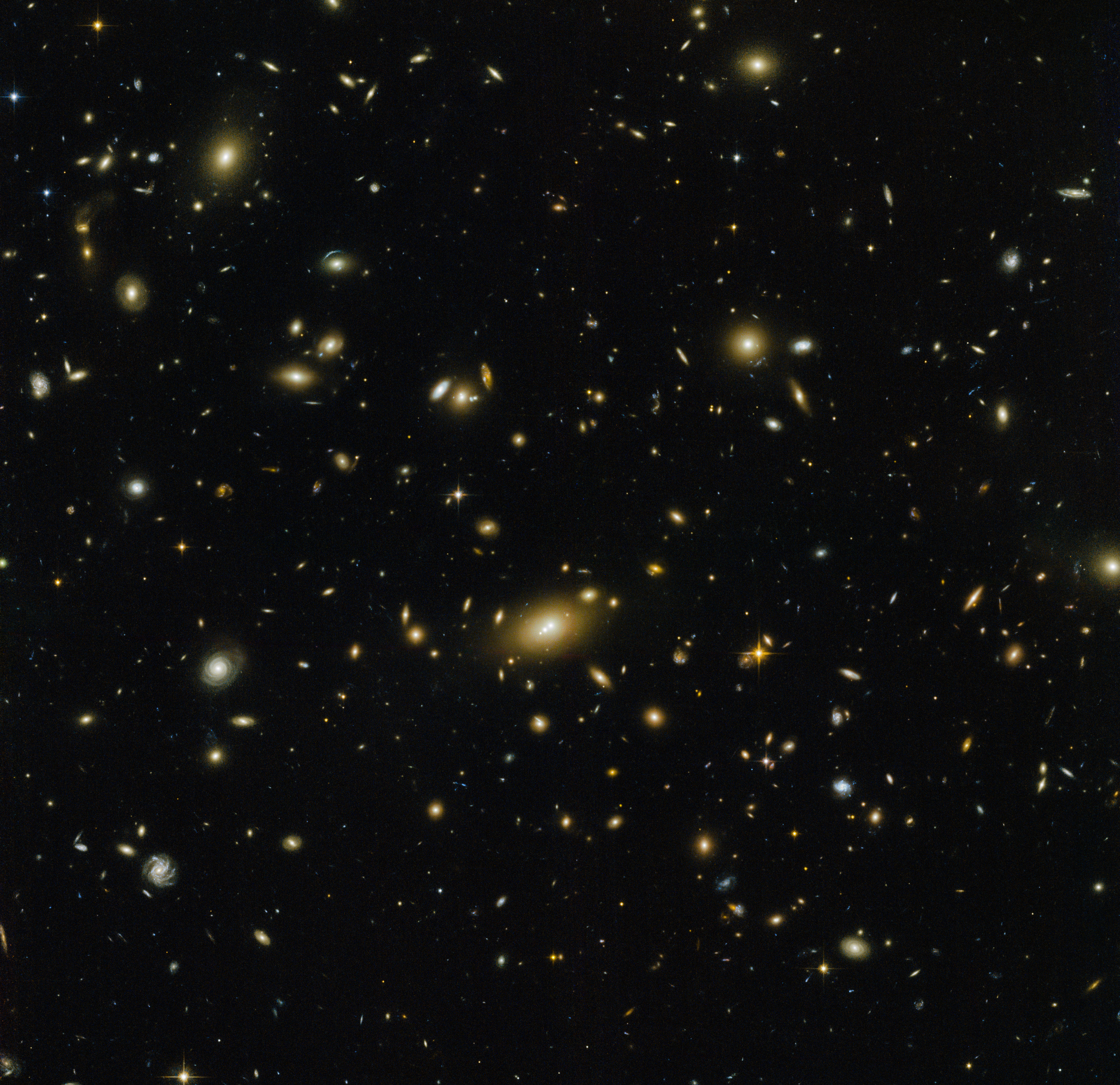
Abell 1300 acts like a lens, bending the very fabric of space around it.

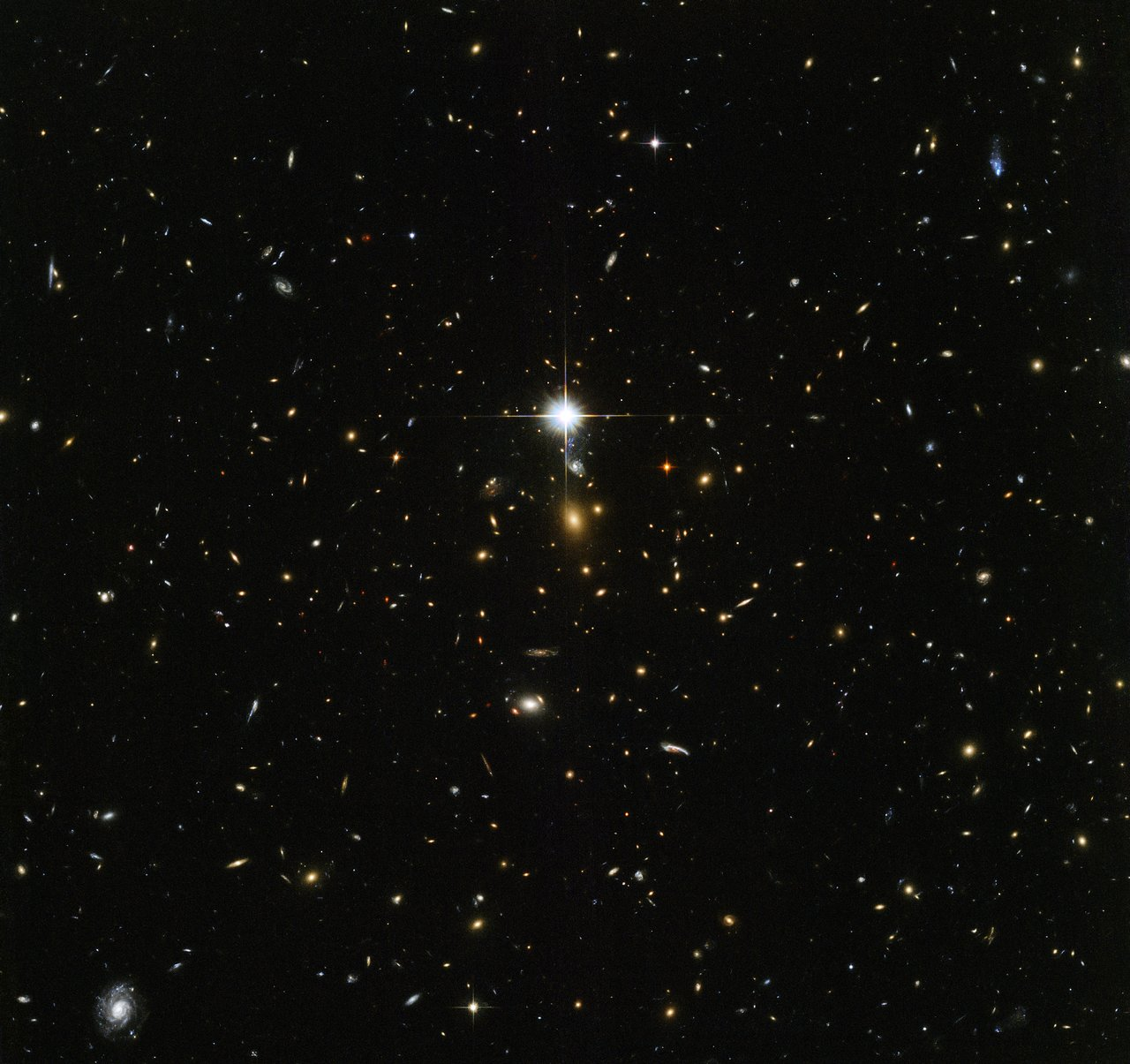
Galaxy cluster WHL J24.3324-8.477.

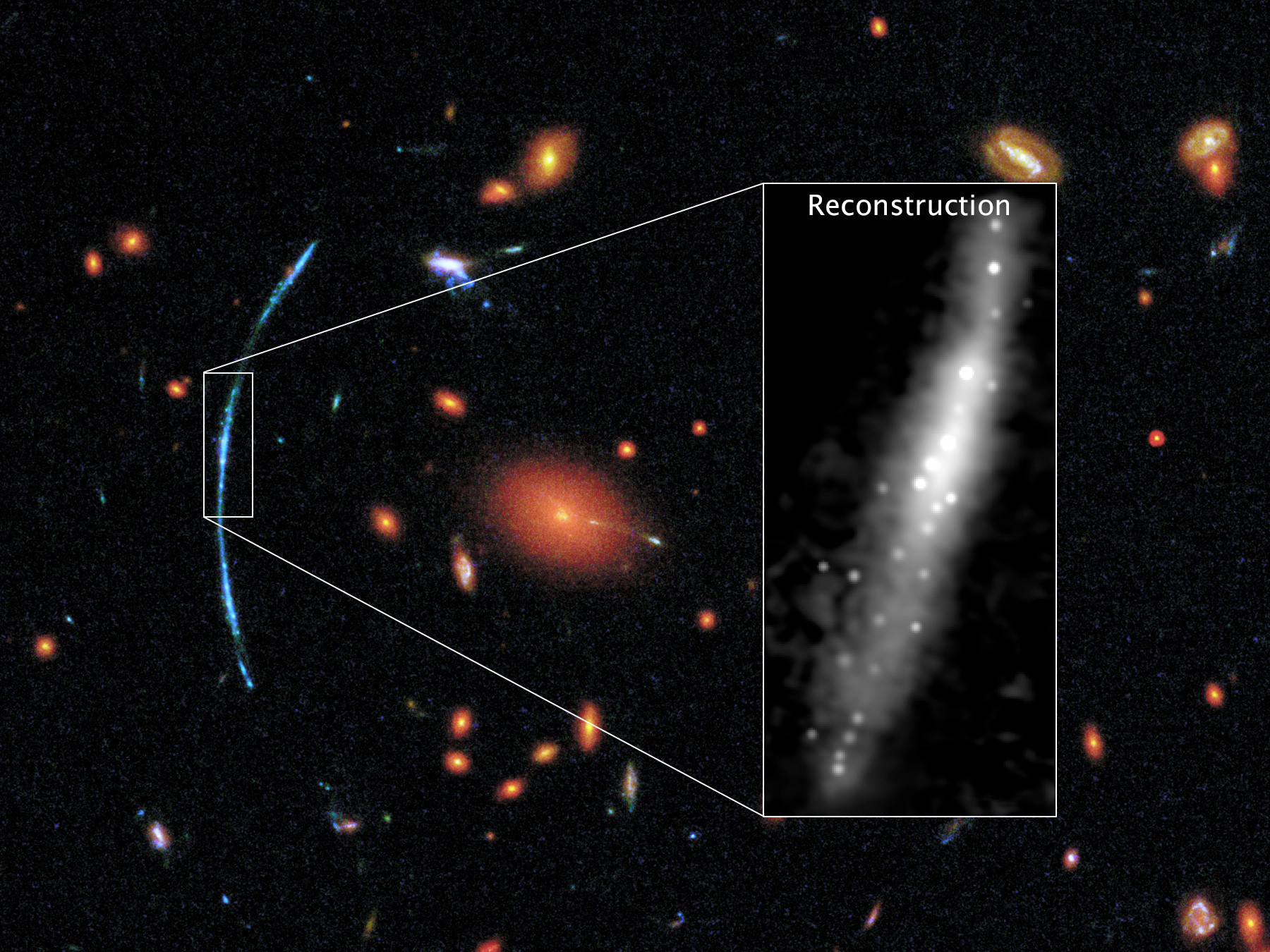
Background galaxy has been gravitationally lensed by the intervening galaxy cluster.

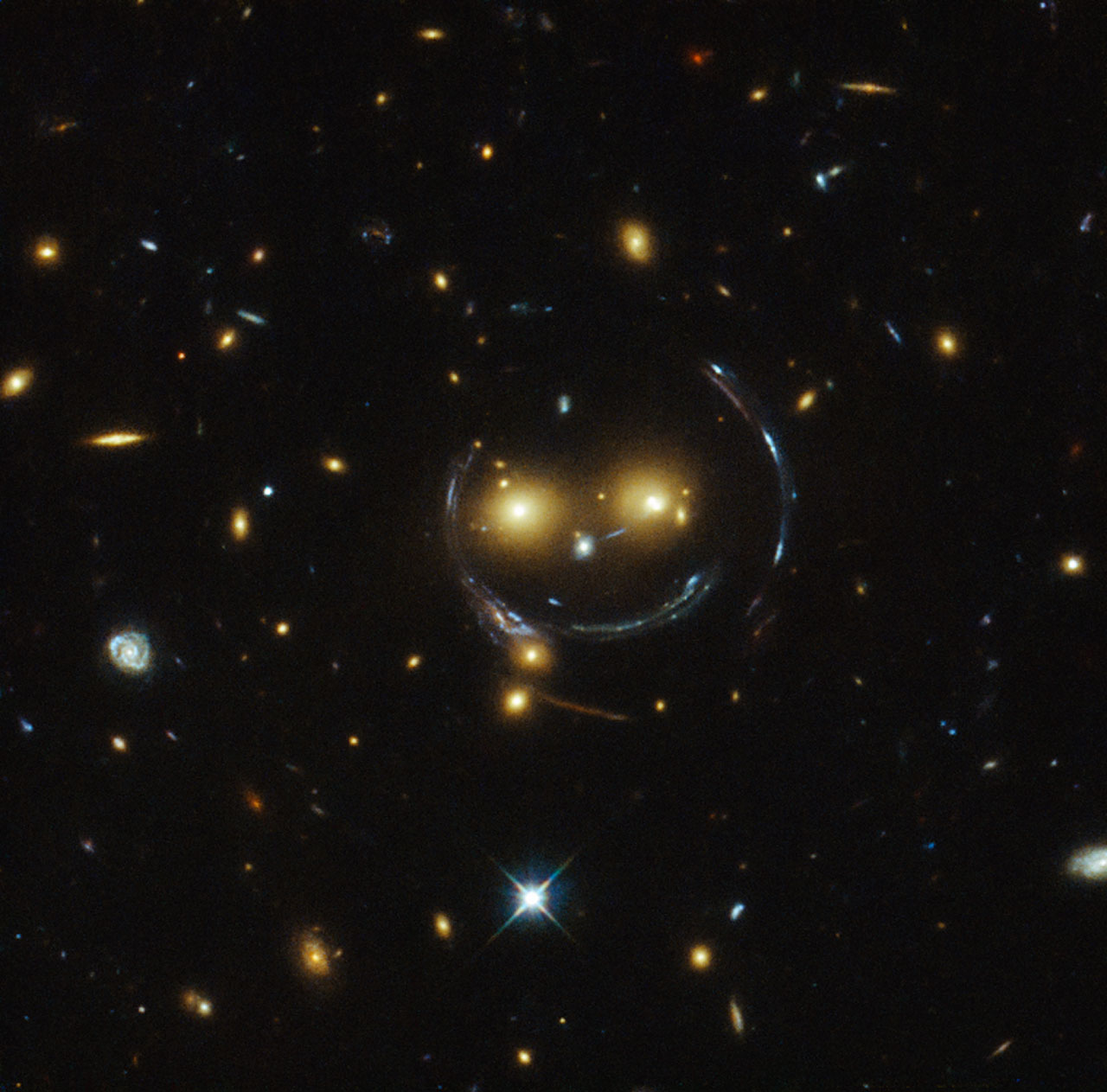
"Smiley" image – galaxy cluster (SDSS J1038+4849) & gravitational lensing (an Einstein ring) (HST).

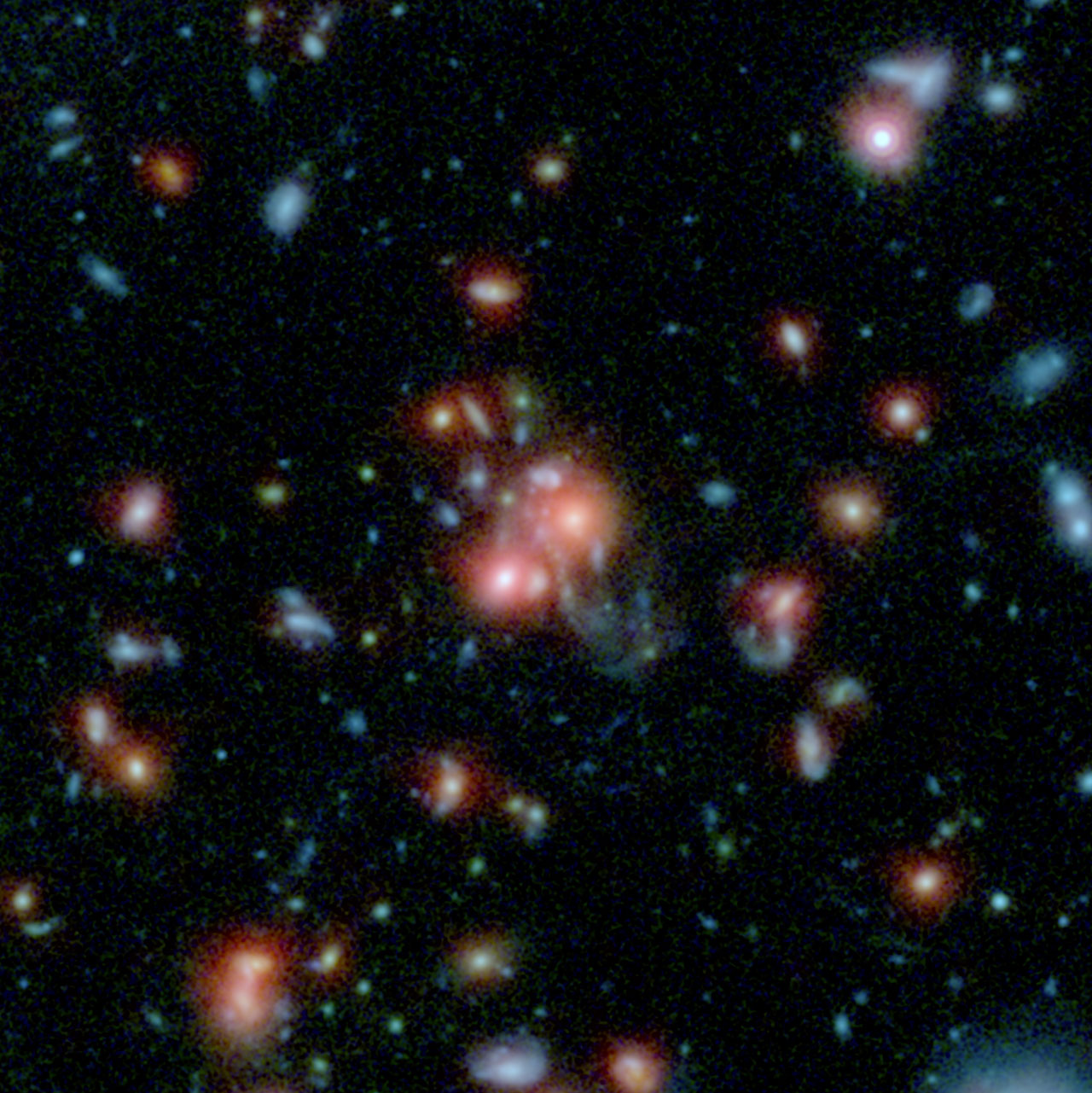
Galaxy cluster SpARCS1049 taken by Spitzer and the Hubble Space Telescope.

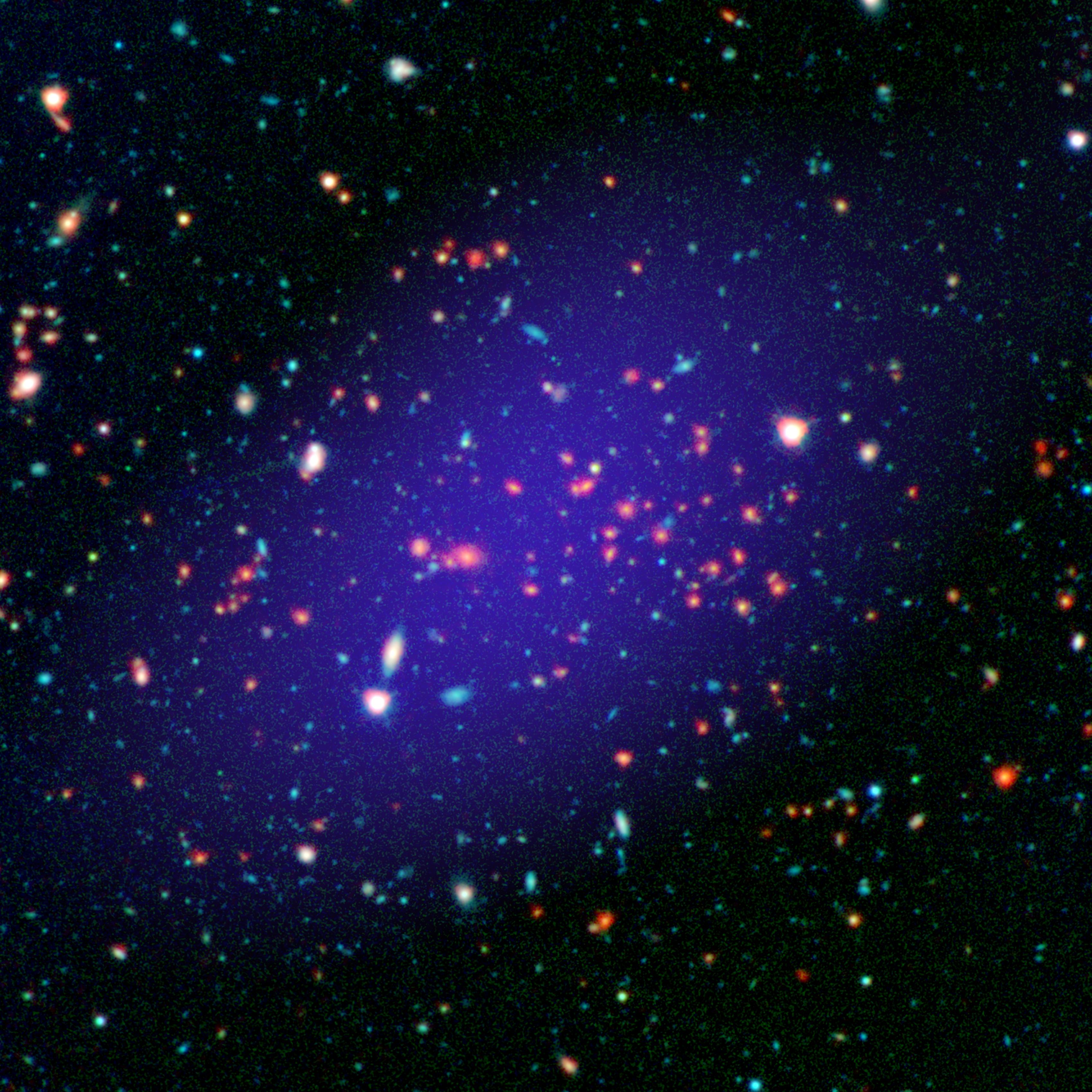
Galaxy cluster MOO J1142+1527 discovered by the MaDCoWS survey

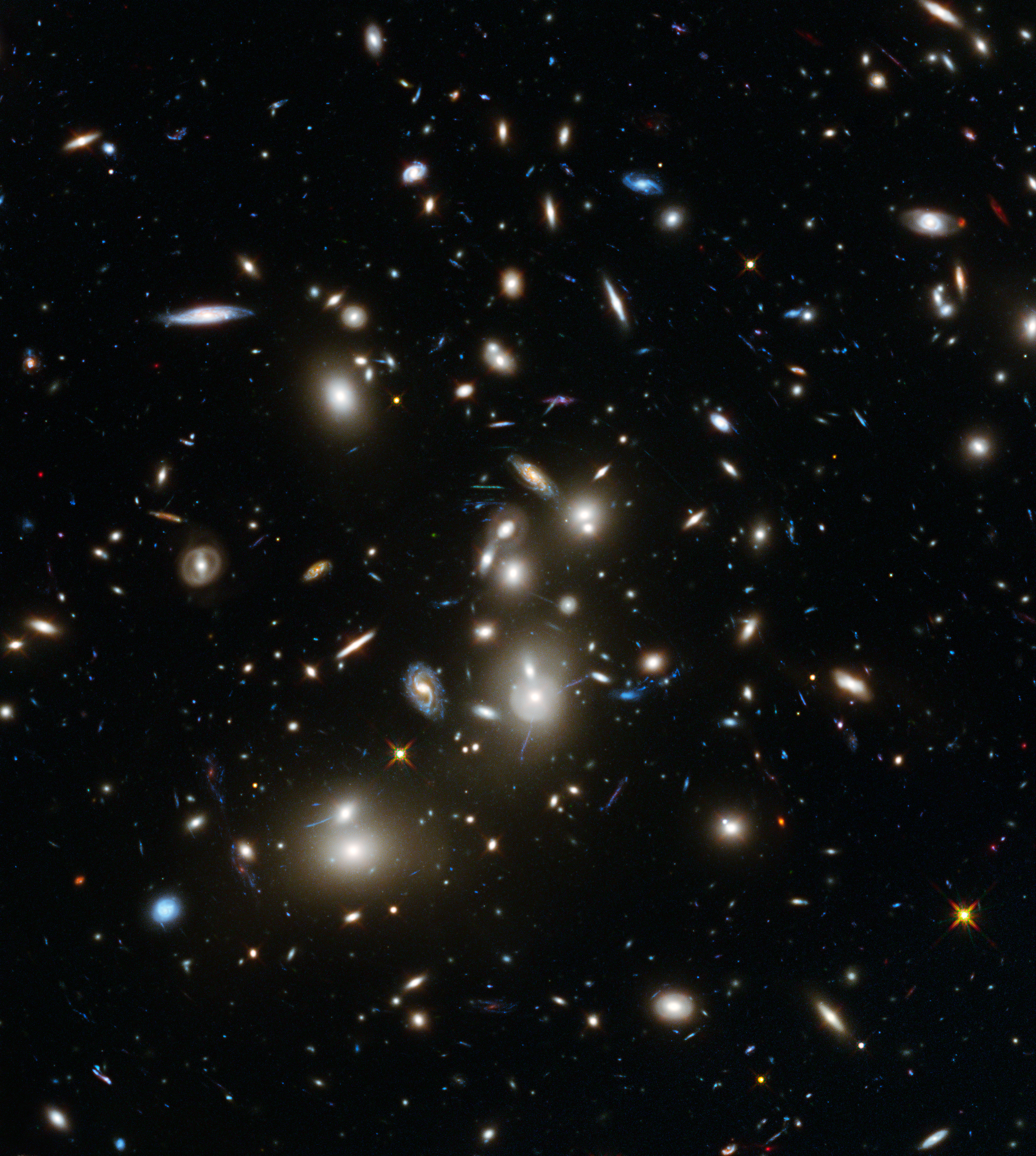
Abell 2744 galaxy cluster (HST).

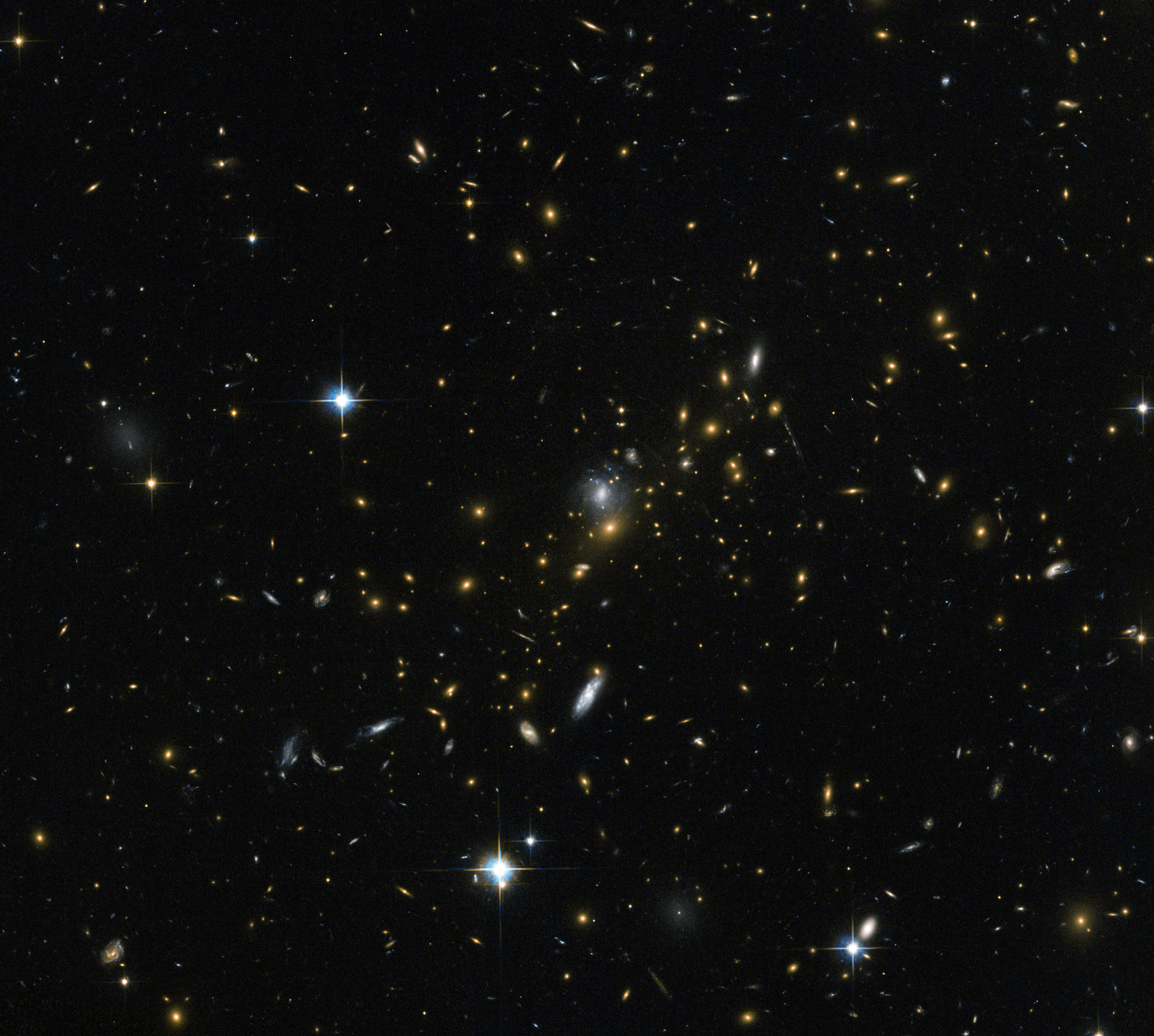
Magnifying the distant universe through MACS J0454.1-0300.

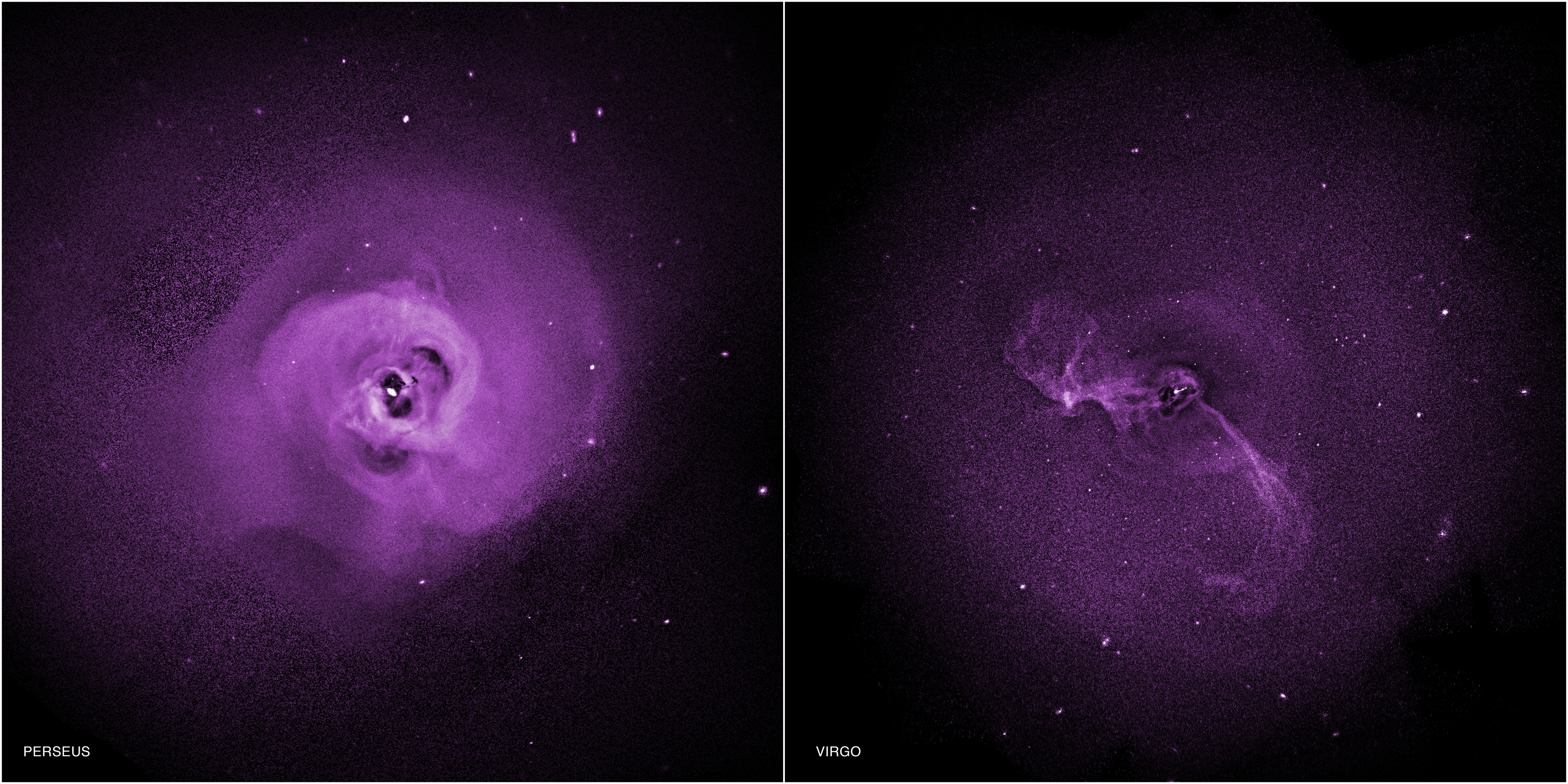
Turbulence may prevent galaxy clusters from cooling; illustrated: Perseus Cluster and Virgo Cluster (Chandra X-ray).

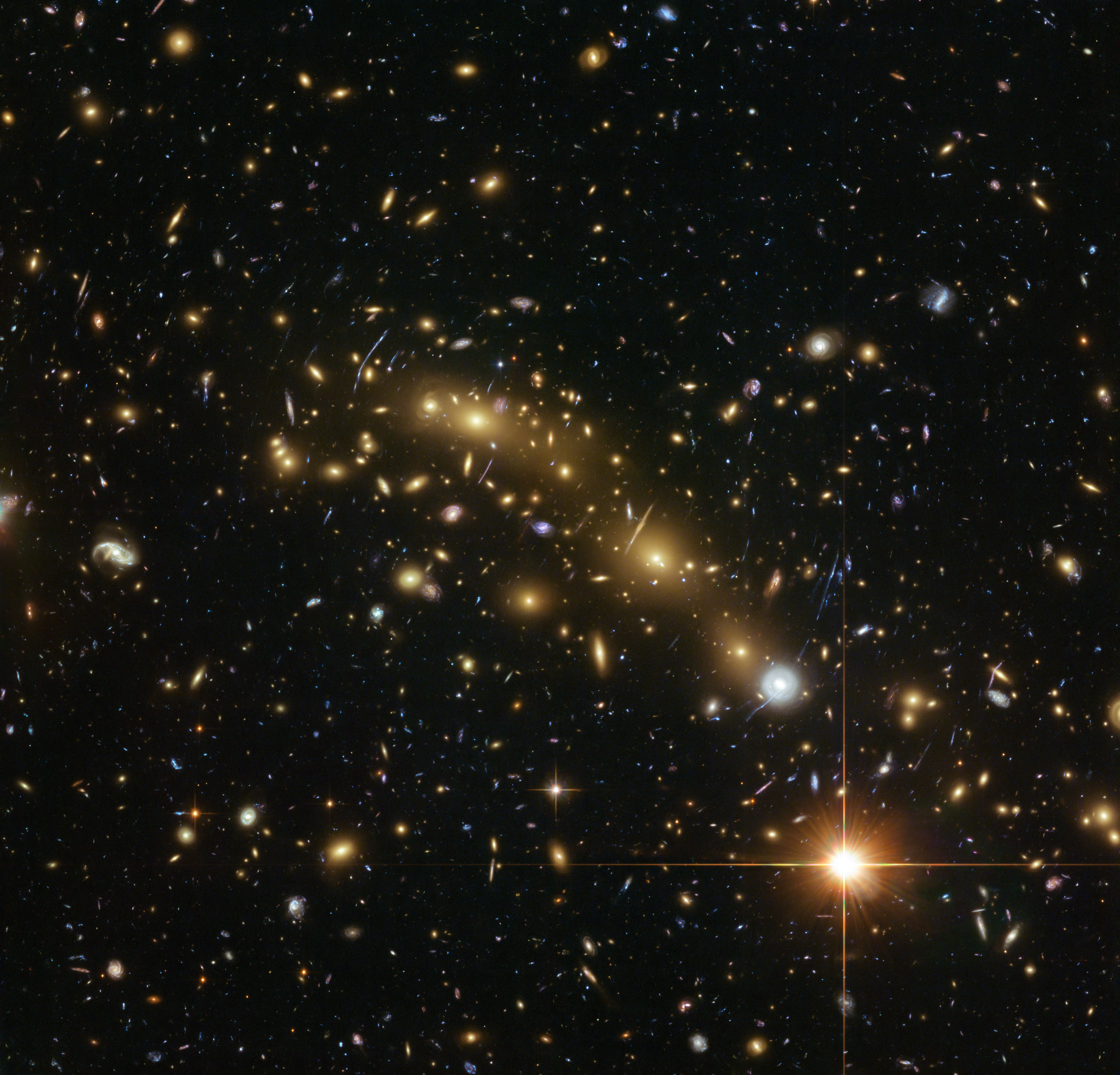
MACS0416.1-2403 imaged by the HST

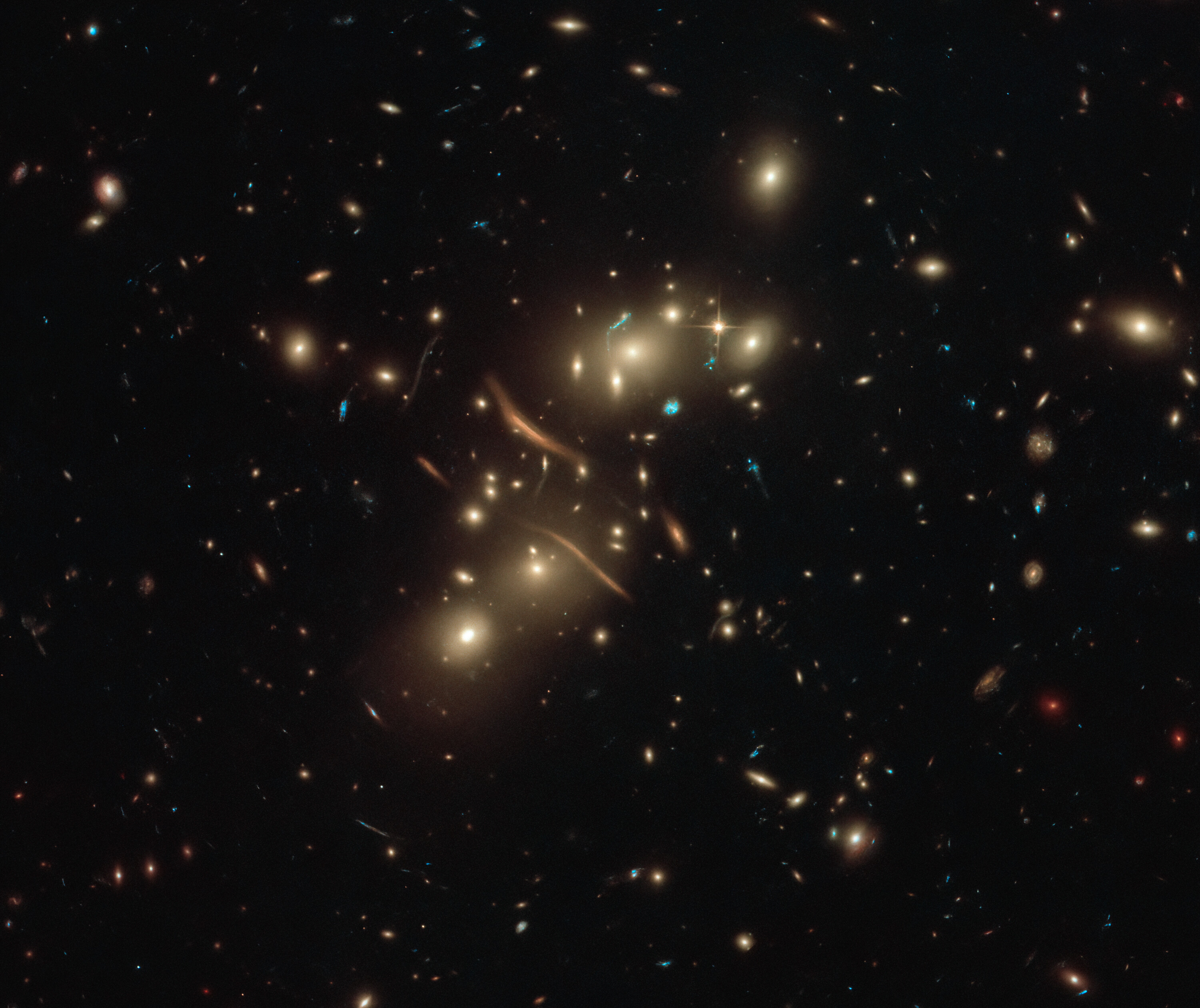
The galaxy cluster Abell 2813 (also known as ACO 2813) image from the NASA/ESA Hubble Space Telescope

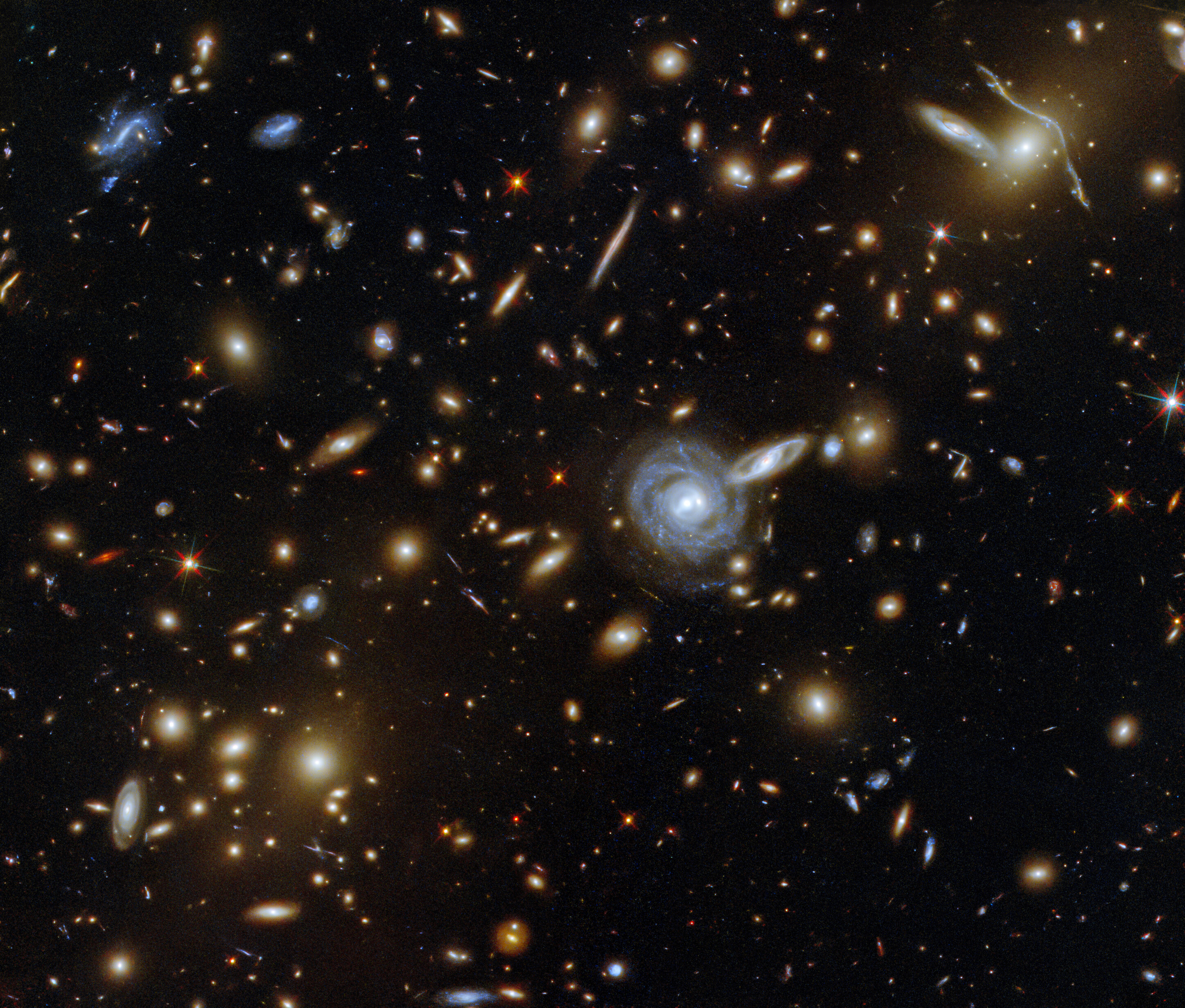
A menagerie of galaxies — the galaxy cluster ACO S 295

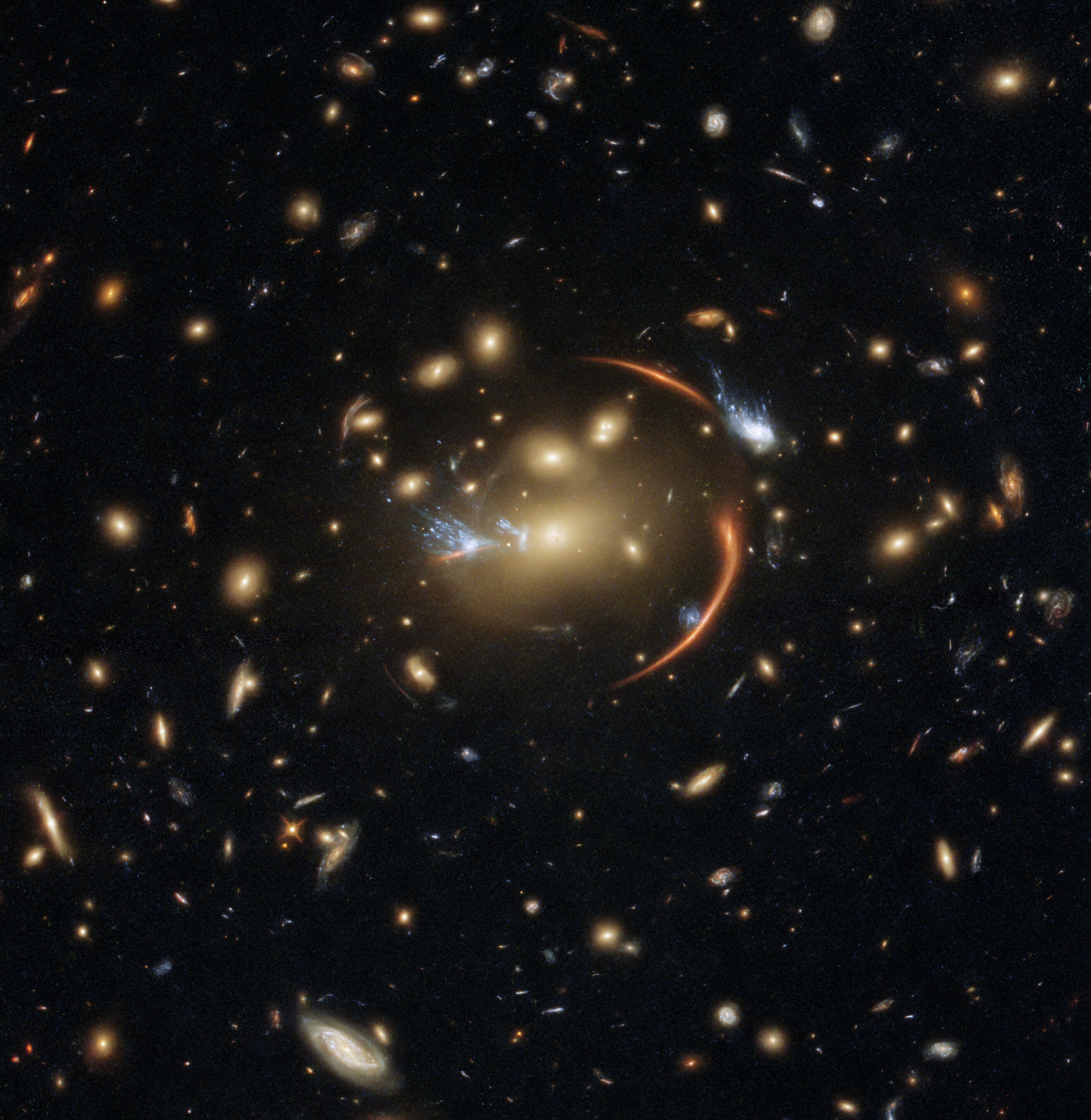
Cosmic lens flare

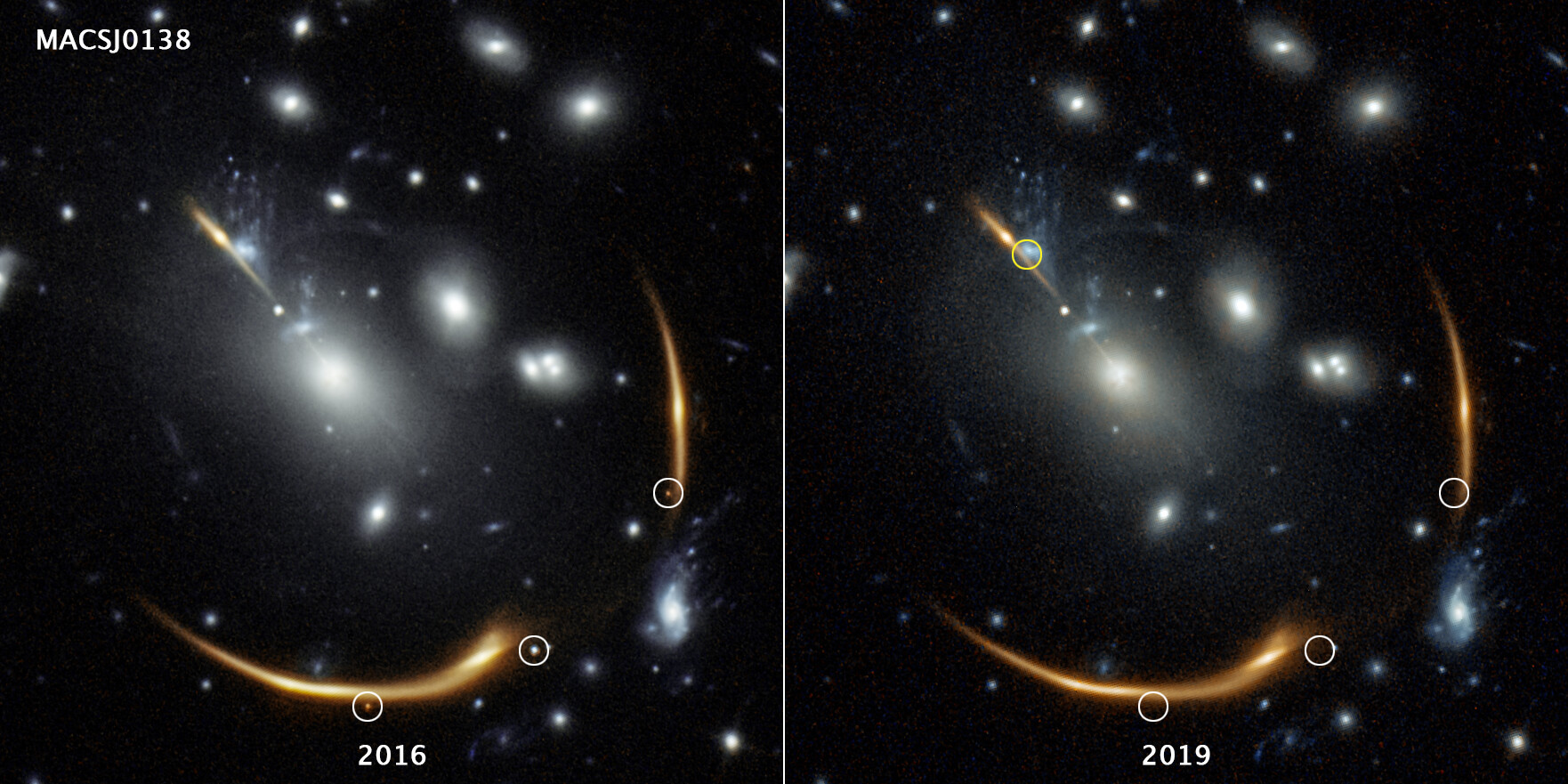
Hubble spots three images of a distant supernova

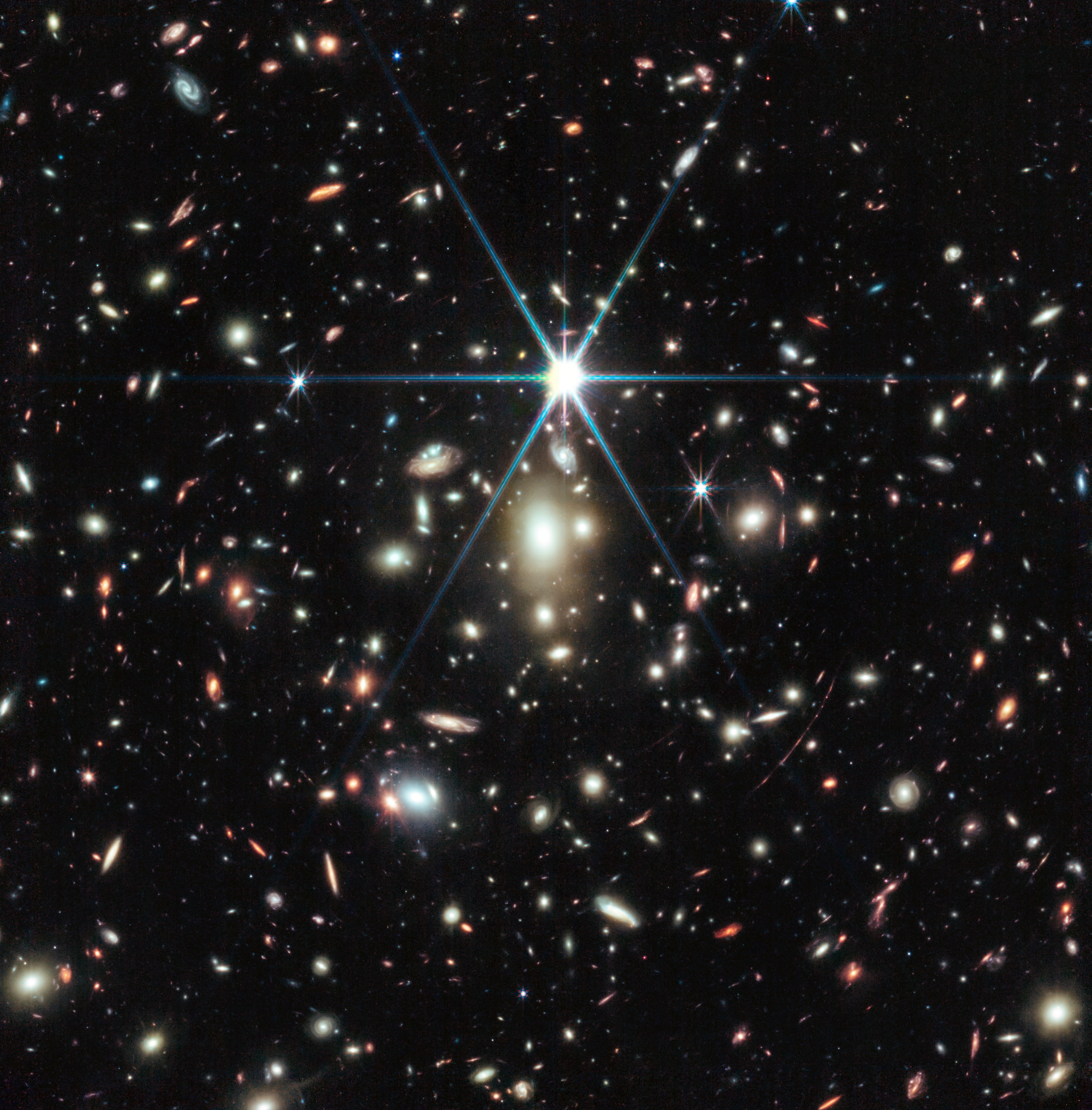
A massive galaxy cluster called WHL0137-08

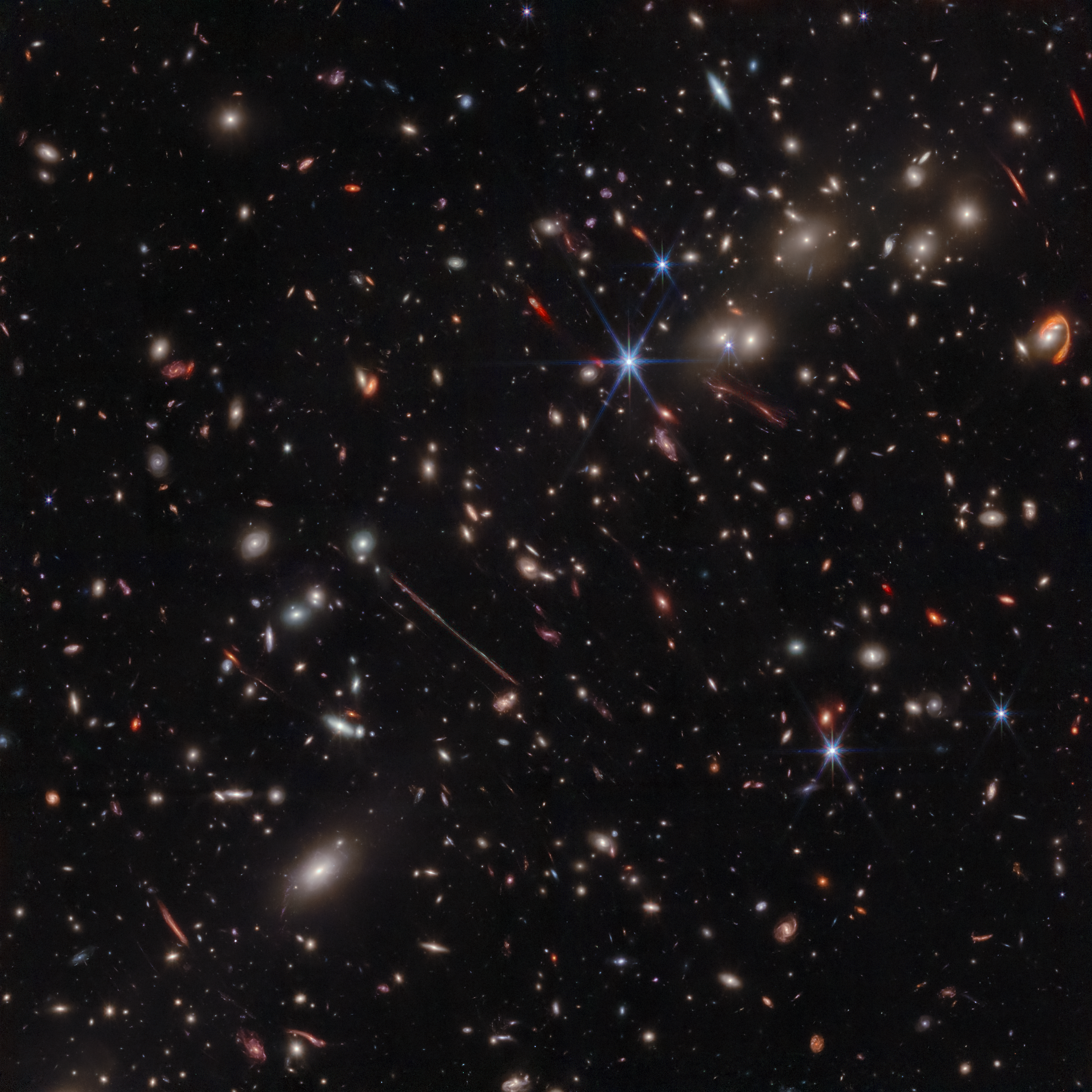
Galaxy cluster known as "El Gordo"

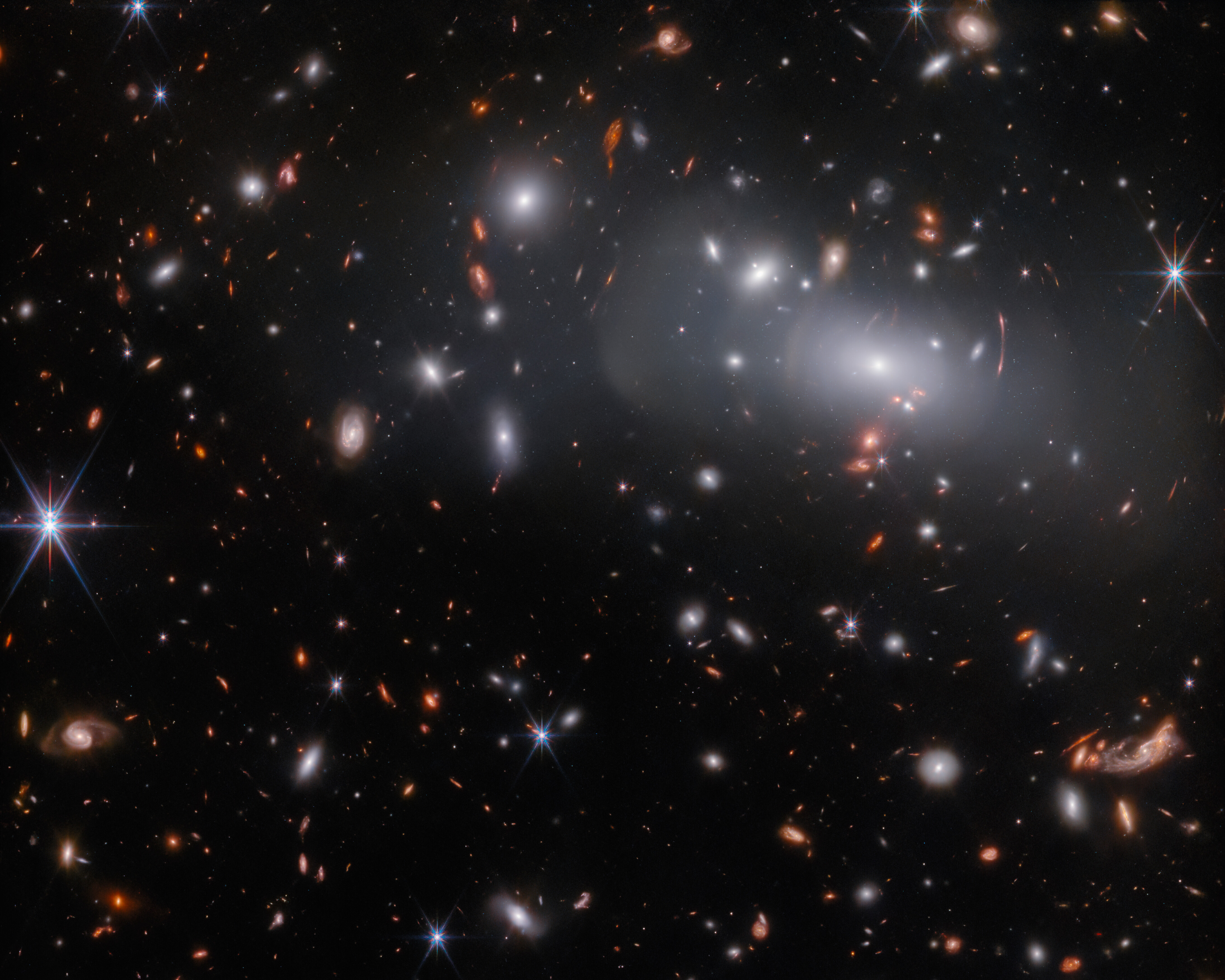
Observation from the James Webb Space Telescope the massive galaxy cluster RX J2129.

=== Videos ===
Video: Formation of galaxy cluster MRC 1138-262 (artist's concept).

== See also ==
- Abell catalogue
- Intracluster medium
- List of Abell clusters
