= SPT-CL J2106−5844 =

Galaxy in the constellation Indus

SPT-CLJ2106−5844 is a galaxy cluster located 7.5 billion light years from Earth. It was discovered by scientists from the South Pole Telescope Collaboration, using the South Pole Telescope. With a weight of about 1.27 × 10^{15} solar masses, it is the most massive distant object known, as of 2011. It is about 60% heavier than previously known object detected in 2008, SPT-CL J0546−5345.

This galaxy cluster was found in the South Pole Telescope Sunyaev-Zel'dovich (SPT-SZ) survey. This survey was done using the Advanced Camera for Surveys and Wide Field Camera 3 on the Hubble Space Telescope. There have been many observations completed in x-ray and infrared imaging to discover new observations about this massive cluster. Like how the central dump is resolved into two different substructures – northwestern and southeastern – which are separated by a distance of ~150 kpc. This distance is immense, considering the distance from Earth to the Galactic Center is only 7-10 kpc. To put this in perspective, the Milky Way galaxy could fit 20 times between these two substructures, the actual diameter of 'SPT-CLJ2106' is much bigger than just this gap.

The cluster has a redshift of z=1.132.

Preceded by SPT-CL J0546−5345	Most massive distant (z~>=1) galaxy cluster 2011 –	Succeeded by current
