= BoRG-58 =

Galaxy protocluster in the constellation Böotes

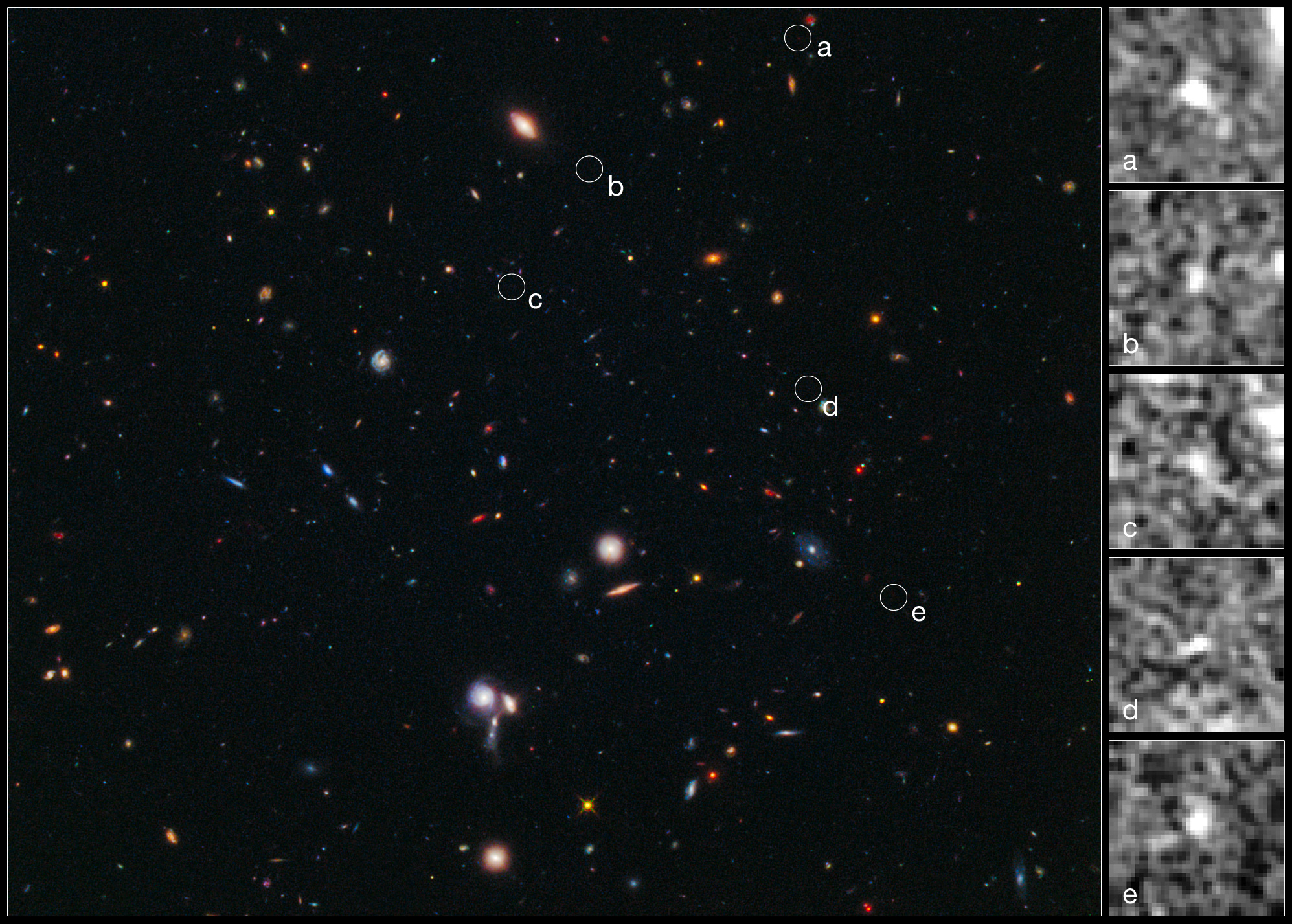
- Composite image of BoRG-58 from the Hubble Space Telescope and, on the right, details of five galaxies in the cluster

Observation data (Epoch J2000)
- Constellation: Boötes
- Right ascension: 14^{h} 36^{m} 55.11^{s}
- Declination: +50° 43′ 09.8″
- Number of galaxies: 5
- Redshift: ~ 8
- Distance: 13.1 billion light-years (Light travel distance)

BoRG-58 is a galaxy protocluster located in the constellation Boötes. It was discovered during a randomized infrared sky scan as part of the Brightest of Reionizing Galaxies (BoRG) program, using the Wide Field Camera 3 of the Hubble Space Telescope. BoRG-58 is located at a distance of 13.1 billion light-years (light-travel time).

In the cluster, five young galaxies have been identified whose images date back to an era corresponding to when the Universe was only 600 million years old from the Big Bang. This phase coincides with the epoch of reionization, the period during which the hydrogen of the gas present in the Universe passed from an almost completely neutral state to being almost completely ionized. These five galaxies were small in size, about 1/20 of the Milky Way, but nevertheless had a luminosity comparable to it.

== List of galaxies ==
Below it is a list of galaxies located in the BoRG-58 protocluster.

1. BoRG58_12071332
2. BoRG58_14061418
3. BoRG58_14550613
4. BoRG58_15140953
5. BoRG58_17871420
