= JADES-ID1 =

Galaxy protocluster in the constellation Fornax

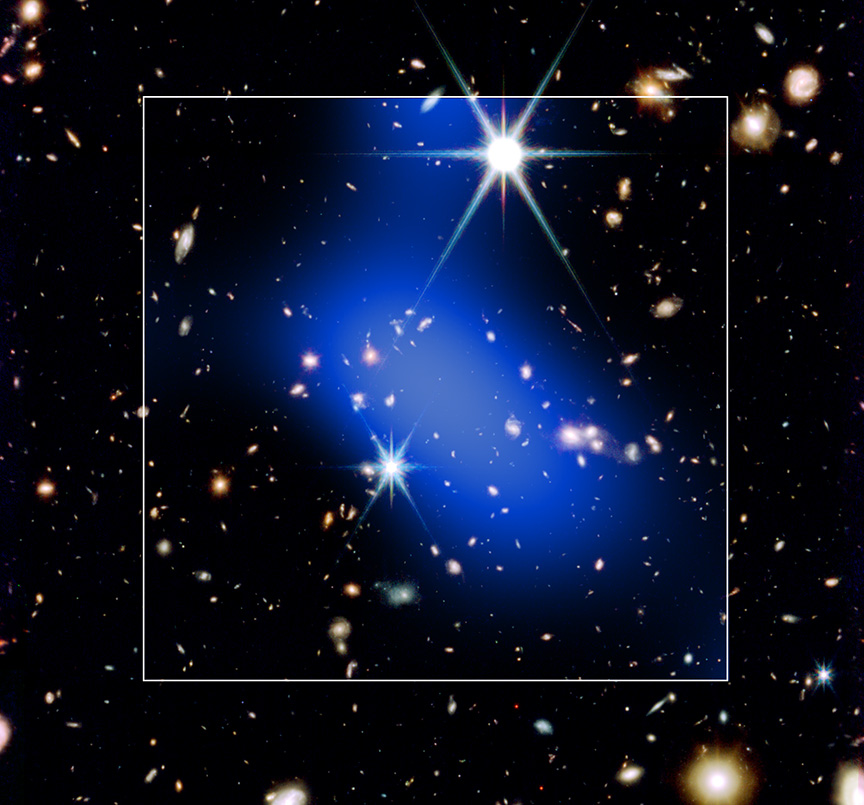
- Composite image of JADES-ID1 made by the Chandra Space Telescope.

Observation data (Epoch J2000)
- Constellation: Fornax
- Right ascension: 03^{h} 32^{m} 31.75^{s}
- Declination: −27° 46′ 51.5″
- Number of galaxies: ~66
- Redshift: ~5.68
- Distance: 12.7 billion light years (light travel distance)

JADES-ID1 is a galaxy protocluster located around 12.7 billion light-years away from the Milky Way galaxy, in the constellation Fornax. Its redshift indicates that it was formed only about 1 billion years after the Big Bang. The space satellite Chandra X-ray Observatory shows that it contains a massive cloud of hot gas. The James Webb Space Telescope found that JADES-ID1 contains a minimum of 66 potential galaxies.

JADES-ID1 lies within the Chandra Deep Field South. This field is part of a deep-sky survey studied by the Chandra X-ray Observatory's satellite.

It has the unusually high overdensity of z ≈ 5.7, indicating that JADES-ID1 a nascent protocluster.

JADES-ID1 emits X-rays and is the earliest protocluster found that has a hot intracluster medium. This stage of cluster formation has never been seen before while the universe was only 3 billion years old.

It has a gravitational mass of approximately 20 trillion solar masses, therefore much too big to be a single galaxy. So, it must contain many galaxies together, all sharing a single gravitational potential. It must have also been in existence long enough to heat up the intracluster gas and start emitting X-rays. This shows substantial gravitational collapse. JADES-ID1 appears to be a bound group that is mature. Models predict this sort of system should only be abundant much later after the Big Bang.

The name JADES-ID1 comes from the survey that observed it, the JWST Advanced Deep Extragalactic Survey (JADES).

== See also ==
- Farthest protoclusters
- Protogalaxy
