= SpARCS1049+56 =

Galaxy cluster

SpARCSJ1049+56
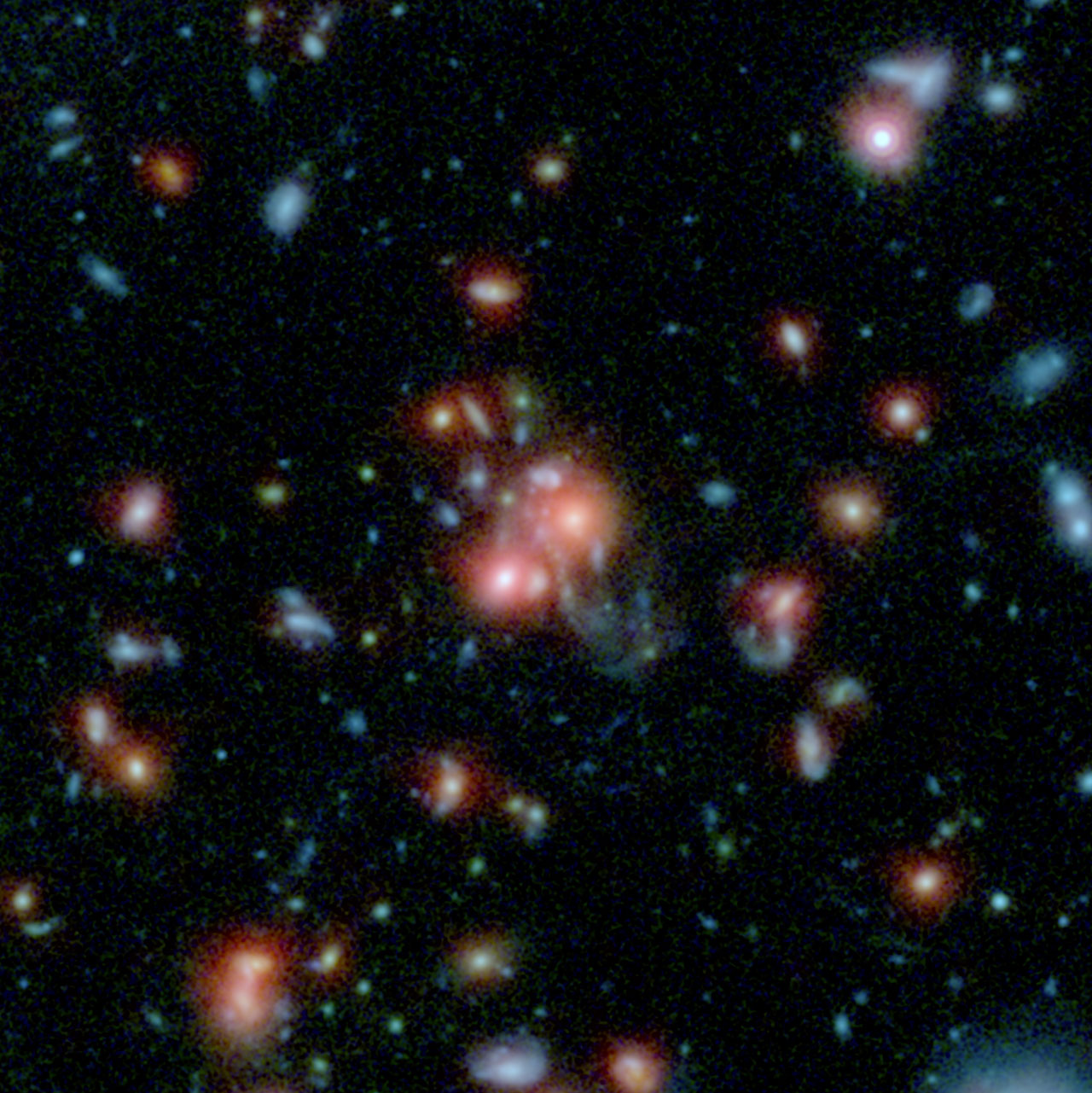
- Image, using data from Spitzer and the Hubble Space Telescope

Observation data (Epoch J2000)
- Right ascension: 10h 49m 22.6s
- Declination: +56° 40′ 33″
- Redshift: 1.7
- Binding mass: (3.5±1.2)×10^{14} M_{☉}

SpARCS1049+56 is a galaxy cluster whose heart is bursting with new stars and located at a distance of about 9.8 billion light-years away from Earth. It was discovered by NASA's Hubble and Spitzer space telescopes on 2015. The galaxy cluster has a redshift of 1.7 and a mass of (3.5±1.2)×10^{14} M_{☉} estimated from weak gravitational lensing.
