= SPT-CL J0546−5345 =

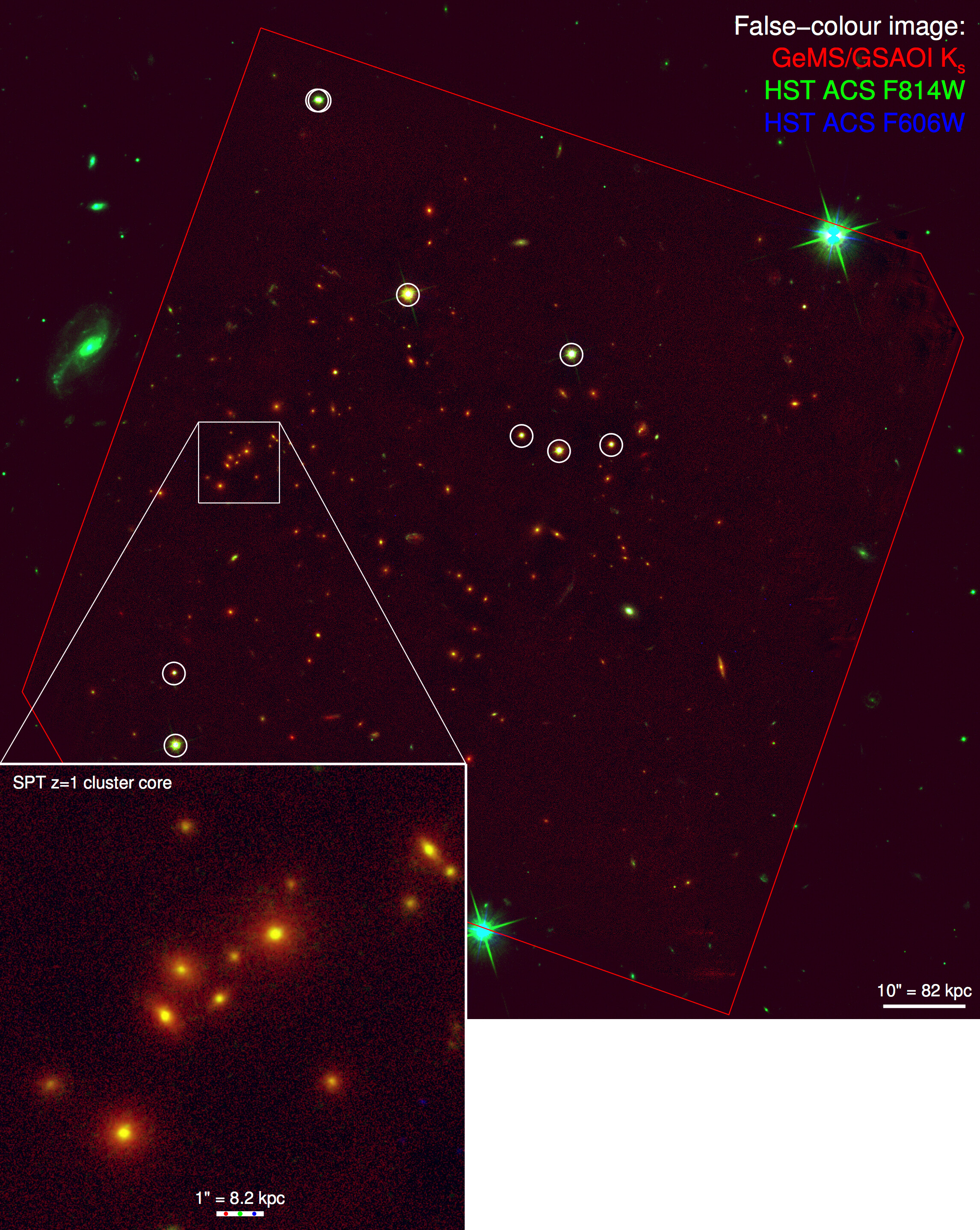
False-color image of the SPT-CL J0546−5345 galaxy cluster: Right ascension / 05^{h} 46^{m} 37^{s}; Declination / −53° 45′ 39.6″; Redshift / 1.067; Mass / 4.85 × 10^{14}$M_\odot$

SPT-CL J0546−5345 is a massive galaxy cluster discovered at the South Pole Telescope in 2008 and was the first galaxy cluster discovered at $z$ > 1 using the Sunyaev–Zeldovich effect. It is thought to be 7 billion light years away and has a redshift of $z$ = 1.067.

The cluster hosts 49 galaxy members and has an estimated total mass of 4.85 × 10^{14}$M_\odot$ based on the Sunyaev–Zel'dovich effect. The cluster field has a galaxy density of approximately $13.1$ galaxies per arcminute$^{-2}$, according to ACS data.

At the time of its discovery, SPT-CL J0546−5345 was the most massive galaxy cluster at $z$ > 1 until 2011 with the discovery of SPT-CL J2106−5844. Chandra observations measured the cluster's X-ray temperature as $T_X = {\displaystyle 6.7_{-0.9}^{+1.4}} ( k e V )$. Follow-up observations using the Spitzer, Chandra, and other optical telescopes have allowed for identification and redshift measurements of cluster members within the galaxy.

SPT-CL J0546−5345 formed early through major galaxy mergers and later experienced adiabatic expansion driven by AGN winds causing mass loss.

Out of 49 cluster members, 21 were studied, with 18 of them exhibiting spectral features of Ca H & K lines while 3 displayed singly ionized oxygen (O$_{II}$) lines. The cluster was also found to have a velocity dispersion of $\sigma = 1179_{-167}^{+232}$ km s$^{-1}$. At the time of its discovery, SPT-CL J0546−5345 was the most dynamically active high-massive cluster identified at $z$ > 1.

== See also ==
- SPT-CL J2106−5844
- SPT-CL J2344−4243
- SPT-CL J0102−4915

Preceded by XMMU J2235.3−2557	Most massive distant (z~>=1) galaxy cluster 2008 – 2011	Succeeded by SPT-CL J2106−5844
