= MRC 1138−262 =

Irregular galaxy in the constellation Hydra

Spiderweb Galaxy
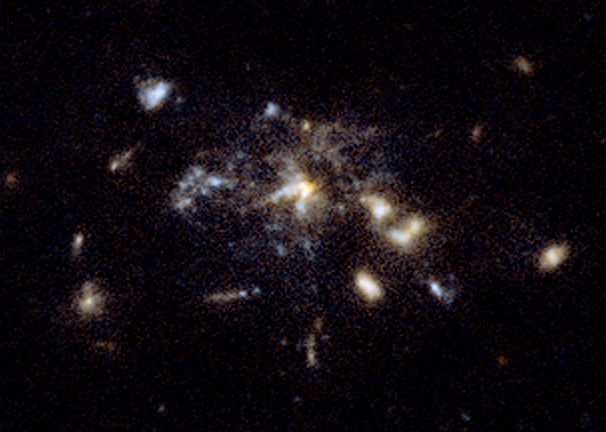
- HST image of the Spiderweb Galaxy

Observation data (J2000.0 epoch)
- Constellation: Hydra
- Right ascension: 11^{h} 40^{m} 48.3^{s}
- Declination: −26° 29′ 09″
- Redshift: 2.156
- Distance: 10.6 billion light-years (light travel distance); ~18 billion light-years (present comoving distance)
- Apparent magnitude (V): 22.00
- Apparent magnitude (B): 18.04

Characteristics
- Type: Irr-II

Other designations
- Spiderweb Galaxy, MRC 1138−262, PKS 1138−26, PGC 2826829
- References: MRC+1138−262

The Spiderweb Galaxy (PGC 2826829, MRC 1138−262) is an irregular galaxy located in the constellation Hydra, with a redshift of 2.156, which is 10.6 billion light years from the Milky Way. It was imaged by the Hubble Space Telescope on 12 October 2006. It was thoroughly studied through radio astronomy, but it was not until the Hubble Space Telescope took a mosaic of photographs from May 17 to May 22, 2005, that its true nature became known. This was documented for the first time on October 10, 2006, in The Astrophysical Journal Letters, volume 650, number 1. The photography was carried out using an advanced camera for surveys by a team led by George K. Miley of the Netherlands' Leiden Observatory.

== General Information ==
Radio-astronomical observations seem to indicate that this is a typical, massive elliptical galaxy, of the type that, with time, transforms into the center of a galactic cluster. However, observations in the band of ultraviolet light indicate that the galaxy possesses an irregular nucleus and a series of "knots" strongly emitting radiation in its interior.

Observations in the spectrum of visible light indicate that, in reality, this is a galaxy being formed through the fusion of galaxy groups and clusters, but in a continuous structure, like a spiderweb, with a massive central nucleus and various smaller ones on the periphery. Give that observations are from 2,000 million years after the Big Bang, this study is an important part of understanding galaxy formation and evolution.

== History ==
In 1948, The Council for Scientific and Industrial Research (now the Commonwealth Scientific and Industrial Research Organisation), part of the University of Sydney, created the Radiophysics Division, led by Bernard Yarnton Mills, who, the next year, began developing new tools and techniques for radio astronomy. The result was the Mills Cross radio telescope, installed in Fleurs (now Badgerys Creek), which began operating in 1964. Between 1958 and 1961, astronomers Bernard Mills, Bruce Slee, and Eric Hill published the Catalogue of Radio Sources (later known as the MSH Catalogue), in which some 2,200 radio sources were introduced. This work was the first study on this wavelength in the southern hemisphere.

This work classifies sources of radio emissions into lists that correspond to the time of right ascension, ordered by the minute. In the second part, titled, A Catalogue of Radio Sources Between Declinations –20° and –50°, in the list at 11:36, there appears a never-before-observed object, that has a spectral flux density of 28×10^{−26} W·m^{2}/Hz (equivalent to 28 fu, the unity of flux density used in astronomy).

Between 1964 and 1968, the astronomers at the Parkes Observatory, in operation since 1961, compiled the Parkes Catalogue, with the intention of expanding the findings of the MSH Catalogue. The first part included 297 sources of radio emissions with a declination between –60° and –90°, 51 of which were previously unknown. The Parkes Catalogue provides the first appearance of code 1138−26, in which 1138 corresponds to the hour and minute of the right ascension and –26 with the degrees of the declination, which are the same features identified in the MHS Catalogue in list 11, number 27. This entry corresponds with the Spiderweb Galaxy.

== Measurements ==
Source	Date	Code	Position		Annual Presecion		Flux Density				Spectral Index			Galactic Coordinates	
Source	Date	Code	Right Ascension	Declination	Δα	Δδ	87 MHz	408 MHz	1410 MHz	2650 MHz	from 87 to 408	from 408 to 1410	from 1410 to 2650	l	b
Mills, Slee, and Hill Catalogue	1960	table 1, list 11 Nº 7	11 h 38 m 01 s	-26º 18'	-	-	28	-	-	-	-	-	-	-	-
Parkes Catalogue	1964	1138−26	11 h 38 m 02 s	-26º 12' 54''	3,00''	-19,96''	28	4,1	0,9	0,4	1,2	1,2	1,3	284	34
Revised Parkes Catalogue	1969	1138−26	11 h 38 m 19,3 s	-26º 12' 48''	3,01''	-20,0''	-	2,9	0,7	0,4	-	-1,1	-0,9	284	34

== See also ==
- Galaxy merger
- Interacting galaxy
