= List of galaxy groups and clusters =

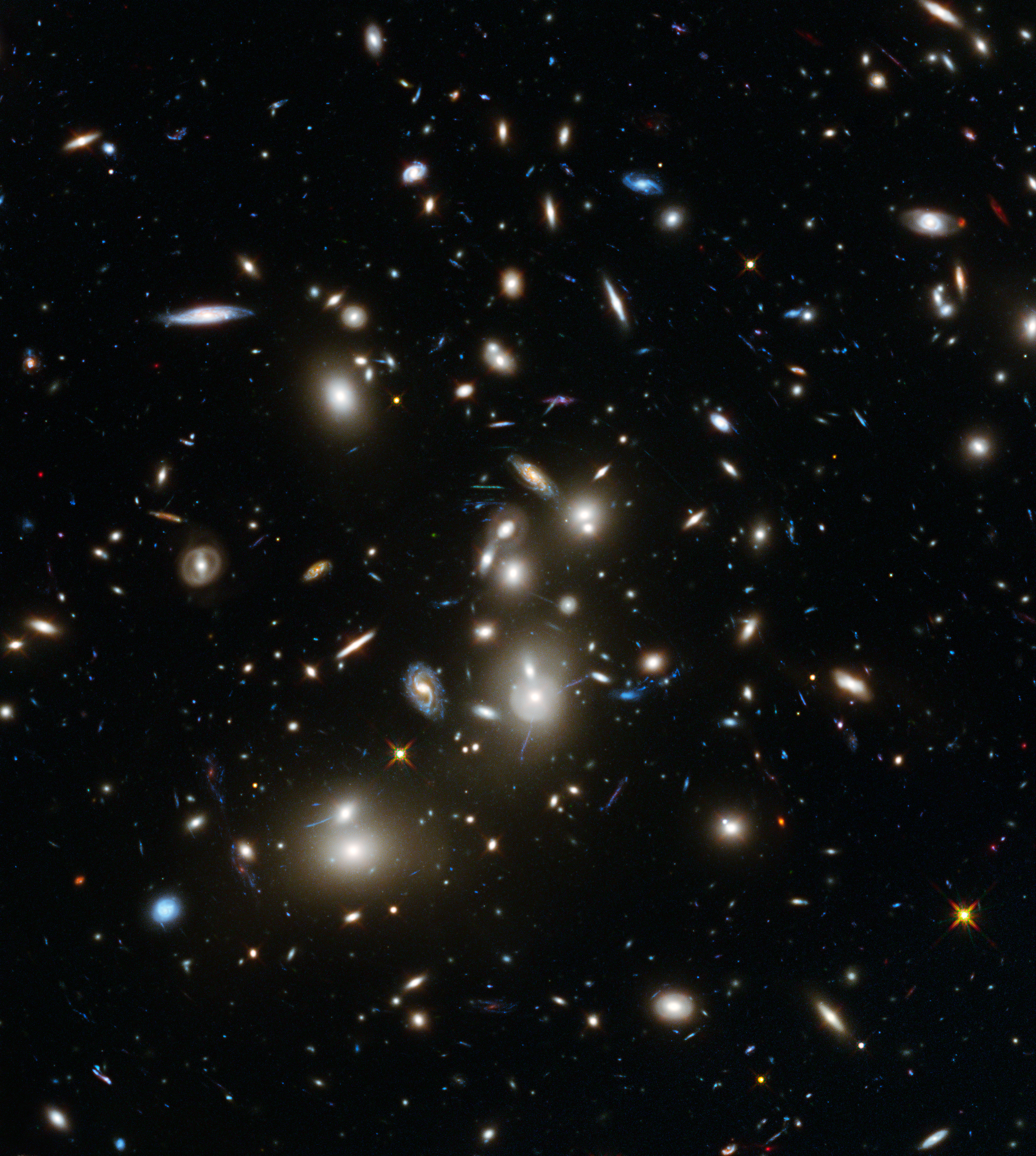
Abell 2744 galaxy cluster - Hubble Frontier Fields view (7 January 2014)

This article lists some galaxy groups and galaxy clusters.

Defining the limits of galaxy clusters is imprecise as many clusters are still forming. In particular, clusters close to the Milky Way tend to be classified as galaxy clusters even when they are much smaller than more distant clusters.

== Clusters exhibiting strong evidence of dark matter ==
Some clusters exhibiting strong evidence of dark matter.

Galaxy cluster	Notes
Bullet Cluster	In this collision between two clusters of galaxies, the stars pass between each other unhindered, while the hot, diffuse gas experiences friction and is left behind between the clusters. The gas dominates the visible mass budget of the clusters, being several times more massive than all the stars. Yet the regions with the stars show more gravitational lensing than the gas region, indicating that they are more massive than the gas. Some dark (since we don't see it), collision-less (or it would have been slowed, like the gas) matter is inferred to be present to account for the extra lensing around otherwise low-mass regions.
Abell 520	This is actually a collision between two galaxy clusters. The galaxies and the dark matter seems to have separated out into separate dark and light cores.
Abell 2142	A collision between two massive, X-ray luminous galaxy clusters.
Cl 0024+17 (ClG 0024+16, ZwCl 0024+1652)	This is a recently coalesced merger of galaxy clusters, which has resulted in a ring of dark matter around the galaxies, yet to be redistributed.

== Named groups and clusters ==
This is a list of galaxy groups and clusters that are well known by something other than an entry in a catalog or list, or a set of coordinates, or a systematic designation.

=== Clusters ===
Galaxy cluster	Origin of name	Notes
Bullet Cluster	The cluster is named for the merger of two clusters colliding like a bullet.	Also has a systematic designation of 1E 0657-56
El Gordo	Named for its size, El Gordo ("the fat one") is the biggest cluster found in the distant universe (at its distance and beyond), at the time of discovery in 2011, with a mass of 3 quadrillion suns. The second most massive galaxy cluster next to El Gordo is RCS2 J2327, a galaxy cluster with the mass of 2 quadrillion suns.	Also has a systematic designation of ACT-CL J0102-4915.
Musket Ball Cluster	Named in comparison to the Bullet Cluster, as this one is older and slower galaxy cluster merger than the Bullet Cluster.	Also has a systematic designation of DLSCL J0916.2+2951.
Pandora's Cluster	Named because the cluster resulted from a collision of clusters, which resulted in many different and strange phenomena.	Also has a catalogue entry of Abell 2744.

=== Groups ===
Galaxy group	Origin of name	Notes
Local Group		The galaxy group that includes the Milky Way.
Bullet Group	Named in comparison with the Bullet Cluster, being of similar formation, except smaller.	Also has a systematic catalogue name SL2S J08544-0121. As of 2014, it was the lowest mass object that showed separation between the concentrations of dark matter and baryonic matter in the object.
Burbidge Chain		
Copeland Septet	Discovered by British astronomer Ralph Copeland in 1874.	
Deer Lick Group	Coined by Tom Lorenzin (author of "1000+ The Amateur Astronomers' Field Guide to Deep Sky Observing") to honor Deer Lick Gap in the mountains of North Carolina, from which he had especially fine views of the galaxy group.	Also referred to as the NGC 7331 Group, after the brightest member of the group.
Leo Triplet	Named for the fact it contains only three galaxies.	This small group of galaxies lies in the constellation Leo.
Markarian's Chain		This stretch of galaxies forms part of the Virgo Cluster.
Robert's Quartet	It was named by Halton Arp and Barry F. Madore, who compiled A Catalogue of Southern Peculiar Galaxies and Associations in 1987.	This compact group of galaxies lies 160 million light-years away in the Phoenix constellation.
Seyfert's Sextet	Named after its discoverer, Carl Seyfert. At the time it appeared to contain six external nebulae. It is also called the NGC 6027 Sextet, after its brightest member.	There are actually only five galaxies in the sextet, and only four galaxies in the compact group. One of the galaxies is an ungravitationally bound background object. The other "galaxy" is instead an extension of the interacting system — a tidal stream caused by the merger. The group is, therefore, more properly called HCG 79; the name refers to the visual collection and not the group. HCG 79 lies 190 million light-years away in the Serpens Caput constellation.
Stephan's Quintet (Stephan's Quartet)	Named after its discoverer, Édouard Stephan.	There are actually only four galaxies in the compact group, the other galaxy is a foreground galaxy. The group is therefore more properly called HCG 92, because the name refers to a visual collection and not a group. Thus, the real group is also called Stephan's Quartet.
Wild's Triplet	Named after the British-born and Australia-based astronomer Paul Wild (1923–2008), who studied the trio in the early 1950s.	
Zwicky's Triplet		

The major nearby groups and clusters are generally named after the constellation they lie in. Many groups are named after the leading galaxy in the group. This represents an ad hoc systematic naming system.

== Groups and clusters visible to the unaided eye ==
The Local Group contains the largest number of visible galaxies with the naked eye. However, its galaxies are not visually grouped together in the sky, except for the two Magellanic Clouds. The IC342/Maffei Group, the nearest galaxy group, would be visible by the naked eye if it were not obscured by the stars and dust clouds in the Milky Way's spiral arms.

Galaxy group	Visible galaxies	Notes
Local Group	5	Apart from the Milky Way, only 4 galaxies are visible to the naked eye.
Centaurus A/M83 Group	2	The Centaurus A galaxy has been spotted with the naked eye by Stephen James O'Meara and M83 has also reportedly been seen with the naked eye.
M81 Group	1	Only Bode's Galaxy (M81, NGC 3031) is visible to the naked eye.

No galaxy cluster is visible to the unaided eye.

== Firsts ==
First discovered	Name	Date	Notes
Galaxy cluster	Virgo Cluster	1784	Discovered by Charles Messier.
Galaxy group			
Compact group	The four brightest members of Stephan's Quintet	1877	Discovered by Edouard Stephan.
Proto-cluster			
Double galaxy	Magellanic Clouds	antiquity	

== Extremes ==
Title	Name	Data	Notes	time
Most distant galaxy cluster	CL J1001+0220	redshift z=2.506	Announced August 2016.	
Nearest galaxy cluster	Virgo Cluster		The Virgo Cluster is at the core of the Virgo Supercluster. The Local Group is a member of the supercluster, but not the cluster.	
Most distant galaxy group				
Nearest galaxy group	Local Group	0 distance	This is the galaxy group that our galaxy belongs to.	
Nearest neighbouring galaxy group	IC 342/Maffei Group			
Most distant proto-cluster	A2744z7p9OD	z=7.88		
Nearest proto-cluster				
Most distant massive proto-cluster	z66OD	z=6.585	At time of discovery in 2019, the object had 12 members, including Himiko.	
Least massive galaxy group				
Most massive galaxy cluster	RX J1347.5-1145	mass= 2.0 ± 0.4 × 10^{15} M_{Sun}	distance: z= 0.451; L_{X-ray} = 6.0 ± 0.1 × 10^{45} erg/s in the [2-10] keV energy band; temperature: kT = 10.0 ± 0.3 keV	

== Closest groups ==
Galaxy groups closer than the Virgo Cluster
Galaxy group	Distance	Redshift (z)	Recession velocity (km/s)	Notes
Local Group	-	-	-	Our Galaxy, the Milky Way, belongs to the Local Group.
LGG 104 (IC 342/Maffei Group, IC 342 / Maffei 1 Group, IC 342 Maffei 1-2 Group)		0.000868	260	The IC 342/Maffei Group contains two subgroups, the IC 342 subgroup (IC 342 Group) and the Maffei 1 subgroup (Maffei subgroup, Maffei 1 Group, Maffei Group).
M81 Group (NGC 3031 Group)	3.5 Mpc (11.4 Mly)	0.001115	334	
Centaurus A/M83 Group (Centaurus A Group, M83 Group)	3.66 Mpc (11.9 Mly)	0.000999	299	The Centaurus A/M83 Group contains two subgroups, the Centaurus A subgroup (Centaurus A Group, NGC 5128 Group, LGG 344) and the M83 subgroup (M83 Group, NGC 5236 Group, LGG 355).
Sculptor Group (South Polar Group)	3.9 Mpc (12.7 Mly)			
Canes Venatici Group (Canes Venatici I Group, Canes I Group, M94 Group, NGC 4736 Group, LGG 291)	4 Mpc (13.0 Mly)	0.001612	483	
NGC 1023 Group (LGG 70)	6.12 Mpc (20.0 Mly)	0.002926	877	
M101 Group (NGC 5457 Group, LGG 371)	7.33 Mpc (23.9 Mly)	0.001288	386	
NGC 2997 Group (LGG 180)	7.66 Mpc (25.0 Mly)	0.002615	784	
Canes Venatici II Group (Canes II Group)	8 Mpc (26.1 Mly)			
M51 Group (NGC 5194 Group, LGG 347)	9.5 Mpc (31.0 Mly)	0.001850	555	
Leo Triplet (M66 Group, NGC 3627 Group, LGG 231)	10.75 Mpc (35.1 Mly)	0.002207	662	
Leo Group (Leo I Group, M96 Group, NGC 3379 Group, LGG 217)	11.66 Mpc (38.0 Mly)	0.002267	680	
Draco Group	12.25 Mpc (40.0 Mly)			
LGG 396 (NGC 5866 Group, NGC 5907 Group)		0.003020	905	
Ursa Major Group (Ursa Major I Group, M109 Group, NGC 3992 Group, NGC 3726 Group, LGG 258)	16.88 Mpc (55.1 Mly)	0.003388	1016	
Mly represents millions of light-years, a measure of distance.; Mpc represents millions of parsecs, a measure of distance (1 Mpc = 3.26 Mly).; z represents redshift, a measure of recessional velocity and inferred distance due to cosmological expansion. In this very nearby context, however, the observed redshift and recessional velocity are due to the Doppler shifting of the light.; Distances are measured from Earth, with Earth being at zero.

== Closest clusters ==
Closest clusters
Galaxy cluster	Distance	Redshift (z)	Recession velocity (km/s)	Notes
Virgo Cluster	18 Mpc (59 Mly)	0.0038	1139	The Virgo Cluster is at the core of the Virgo Supercluster. The Local Group is a member of the supercluster, but not the cluster.
Fornax Cluster (Abell S 373, AM 0336-353, MCL 52)	19 Mpc (62 Mly)	0.0046	1379	
Antlia Cluster (Abell S 636)	40.7 Mpc (133 Mly)	0.0087	2608	Also called the Antlia Group.
Centaurus Cluster (Abell 3526, Cl 1247-4102)	52.4 Mpc	0.0110	3298	
Hydra Cluster (Hydra I Cluster, Abell 1060, Cl 1034-2716)	58.3 Mpc	0.0114	3418	
Mly represents millions of light-years, a measure of distance.; Mpc represents millions of parsecs, a measure of distance.; z represents redshift, a measure of recessional velocity and inferred distance due to cosmological expansion.; Distances are measured from Earth, with Earth being at zero.

== Farthest clusters ==
Farthest clusters
Galaxy cluster	Distance	Notes
No entries yet
Mly represents millions of light-years, a measure of distance.; Mpc represents millions of parsecs, a measure of distance.; z represents redshift, a measure of recessional velocity and inferred distance due to cosmological expansion.; Distances are measured from Earth, with Earth being at zero.

Most remote cluster titleholder
Galaxy cluster	Date	Redshift (z)	Recession Velocity (km/s)	Notes
CL J1001+0220	2016 −	2.506		
CL J1449+0856 (ClG J1449+0856)	2011–2016	2.07		
JKCS 041	2009–2011	1.9		
XMMXCS 2215-1738 (XMMXCS 2215.9-1738)	2006–2009	1.45		XMM-XCS 2215-1738 was also the most massive early cluster so far discovered.
ISCS J143809+341419	2005–2006	1.41		
XMMU J2235.3-2557	2005	1.393		
RDCS 0848+4453 (RDCS0848.6+4453, RX J0848+4453, ClG 0848+4453 )	1997–	1.276		ClG 0848+4453 forms a double-cluster supercluster with RDCS J0849+4452
galaxy cluster around 3C 324 (3C 234 Cluster)	1984–	1.206		At the time, the BCG, 3C324 was the most distant non-quasar galaxy.
Cl 1409+524	1960–1975	0.461		The measurement of 3C295's redshift in 1960 also defined its cluster's position. 3C 295 was also the most distant galaxy of the time.
Abell 732 (fainter Hydra Cluster Cl 0855+0321)	1951–1960	0.2	61 000	Attempts at measuring the redshift of the brightest cluster galaxy of this Hydra Cluster had been attempted for years before it had been successfully achieved. The BCG was also the most distant galaxy of the time.
Abell 1930 (Bootes Cluster)	1936–1951	0.13	39 000	The BCG of this cluster was also the most distant galaxy of the time.
Gemini Cluster (Abell 568)	1932 − 1936	0.075	23 000	The BCG of this cluster was the most distant galaxy at the time.
WH Christie's Leo Cluster	1931–1932		19 700	The BCG of this cluster was the most distant galaxy known at the time.
Baede's Ursa Major Cluster	1930–1931		11 700	The BCG of this cluster was the highest redshift galaxy of the time.
Coma Cluster	1929–1930	0.026	7 800	This cluster's distance was determined by one of the NGC objects lying in it, NGC4860.
Pegasus Group (LGG 473, NGC 7619 Group)	1929	0.012	3 779	The BCG for this group was used to measure its redshift. Shortly after this was publicized, it was accepted that redshifts were an acceptable measure of inferred distance.
Cetus Group (Holmberg 45, LGG 27)	1921–1929	0.006	1 800	NGC 584 (Dreyer 584) was measured for the redshift to this galaxy group.
Virgo Cluster	1784–1921	59 Mly (18 Mpc) z=0.003	1 200	This was the first noted cluster of "nebulae" that would become galaxies. The first redshifts to galaxies in the cluster were measured in the 1910s. Galaxies were not identified as such until the 1920s. The distance to the Virgo Cluster would have to wait until the 1930s.
Mly represents millions of light-years, a measure of distance.; Mpc represents millions of parsecs, a measure of distance.; z represents redshift, a measure of recessional velocity and inferred distance due to cosmological expansion.; Distances are measured from Earth, with Earth being at zero.

- In 2003 RDCS 1252-29 (RDCS1252.9–2927) at z=1.237, was found to be the most distant rich cluster, which lasted until 2005.
- In 2000, a cluster was announced in the field of quasar QSO 1213-0017 at z=1.31 (the quasar lies at z=2.69)
- In 1999, cluster RDCS J0849+4452 (RX J0849+4452, RXJ0848.9+4452) was found at z=1.261
- In 1995 and 2001, the cluster around 3C 294 was announced, at z=1.786
- In 1992, observations of the field of cluster Cl 0939+4713 found what appears to be a background cluster near a quasar, also in the background. The quasar was measured at z=2.055 and it was assumed that the cluster would be as well.
- In 1975, 3C 123 and its galaxy cluster was incorrectly determined to lie at z=0.637 (actually z=0.218)
- In 1958, cluster Cl 0024+1654 and Cl 1447+2619 were estimated to have redshifts of z=0.29 and z=0.35 respectively. However, they were not spectroscopically determined.

== Farthest protoclusters ==
5 Farthest protoclusters
Galaxy protocluster	Distance	Notes
No entries yet
Mly represents millions of light-years, a measure of distance.; Mpc represents millions of parsecs, a measure of distance.; z represents redshift, a measure of recessional velocity and inferred distance due to cosmological expansion.; Distances are measured from Earth, with Earth being at zero.

Most remote protocluster titleholder
Galaxy protocluster	Date	Redshift (z)	Notes
BoRG-58	2012	~ 8	
COSMOS-AzTEC3	2011–	5.3	Located in Sextans, the cluster appears to contain 11 young small galaxies.
Protocluster around radio-galaxy TN J1338-1942	2002–	4.11	It was described as the most distant cluster.
Protocluster around 3C 368	1982–	1.13	
z represents redshift, a measure of recessional velocity and inferred distance due to cosmological expansion.; Distances are measured from Earth, with Earth being at zero.

In 2002, a very large, very rich protocluster, or the most distant protosupercluster was found in the field of galaxy cluster MS 1512+36, around the gravitationally lensed galaxy MS 1512-cB58, at z=2.724.

== False clusters ==
Sometimes clusters are put forward that are not genuine clusters or superclusters. Through the researching of member positions, distances, peculiar velocities, and binding mass, former clusters are sometimes found to be the product of a chance line-of-sight superposition.

Former cluster	Notes
Cancer Cluster	The Cancer Cluster was found to be a random assortment of galaxy groups, and not a true cluster.
Coma-Virgo Cloud	The early identification of the Coma-Virgo Cloud of Nebulae was actually a mistaken identification due to the superposition of the Virgo Supercluster and Coma Supercluster, and not a Coma-Virgo Supercluster

== See also ==
- Lists of astronomical objects
- Galaxy cluster
- Galaxy group
- Illustris project
- List of galaxies

=== Lists of groups and clusters ===
- Catalogue of Galaxies and of Clusters of Galaxies
- Hickson Compact Group
- List of Abell clusters
- List of galaxy superclusters
- Lyons Groups of Galaxies
- Virgo Supercluster
