= 2XMM J083026+524133 =

Large galaxy cluster 7.7 billion light-years away

Observation data (Epoch J2000)
- Constellation(s): Lynx
- Right ascension: 08^{h} 30^{m} 25.9^{s}
- Declination: +52° 41′ 32″
- Redshift: 0.99
- Distance: 3.3 Gpc (11 billion light-years)

Other designations
- X-CLASS 1649

2XMM J083026+524133 (2XMM J0830) is a very large galaxy cluster that lies 7.7 billion light-years away. It was discovered by chance by ESA's XMM Newton and the Large Binocular Telescope (LBT) in Arizona in 2008 while it was looking at the quasar APM 08279+5255.

As of 2008, it was the largest known galaxy cluster at red shift z ≧ 1, weighing in at an estimated 10^{15} solar masses. However, galaxy cluster XMMXCS 2215-1738 is several billion light years farther away.

== See also ==
- Galaxy cluster
- XMM Newton
- XMM Cluster Survey (XCS)

Preceded by	Most massive distant (z~>=1) galaxy cluster 2008 – 2009	Succeeded by XMMU J2235.3-2557
