= XMMXCS 2215−1738 =

Galaxy cluster in the constellation of Aquarius

XMXCS 2215−1738

Observation data (Epoch J2000)
- Constellation: Aquarius
- Right ascension: 22^{h} 15^{m} 58.5^{s}
- Declination: −17° 38′ 02″
- Redshift: 1.45
- Distance: 4.3 Gpc (14 billion light-years)

Other designations
- BLOX J2215.9−1738.1

XMMXCS 2215−1738 is a galaxy cluster that lies 10 billion light-years away and has a redshift value of z=1.45. It was discovered by the XMM Cluster Survey in 2006.

Discovered in 2006, XMMXCS 2215−1738 is one of the most distant galaxy clusters known. It is embedded in intergalactic gas that has a temperature of 10 million degrees. The estimated mass of the cluster is 500 trillion solar masses, most coming from dark matter. The cluster was discovered and studied using the XMM-Newton and Keck Telescopes. The cluster is surprisingly large and evolved for a cluster that existed when the universe was only 3 billion years old.

Led by University of Sussex researchers, part of the XMM Cluster Survey (XCS) used X-ray Multi Mirror (XMM) Newton satellite to find it, Keck Telescope to determine distance, and used the Hubble Space Telescope to further image it.

It contains hundreds of reddish galaxies surrounded by x-ray-emitting gas.

"The existence of the cluster so early in the history of the universe challenges ideas about how galaxies formed"

— Adam Stanford, research scientist at UC Davis and the Lawrence Livermore National Laboratory.

The galaxy is called XMMXCS 2215−1734 in many references, with some news sources listing both names. The source of the naming contradiction between XMMXCS 2215−1734 and XMMXCS 2215−1738 is not known. However, XMMXCS 2215−1738 seems to be the more accurate.

== See also ==
- 2XMM J083026+524133
- galaxy cluster
- XMM-Newton
- XMM Cluster Survey
- List of the most distant astronomical objects

Preceded by	Most massive distant (z~>=1) galaxy cluster 2006 –	Succeeded by
Preceded by	Most distant galaxy cluster 2006 –	Succeeded by
