= NGC 7061 =

Elliptical galaxy in the constellation Indus

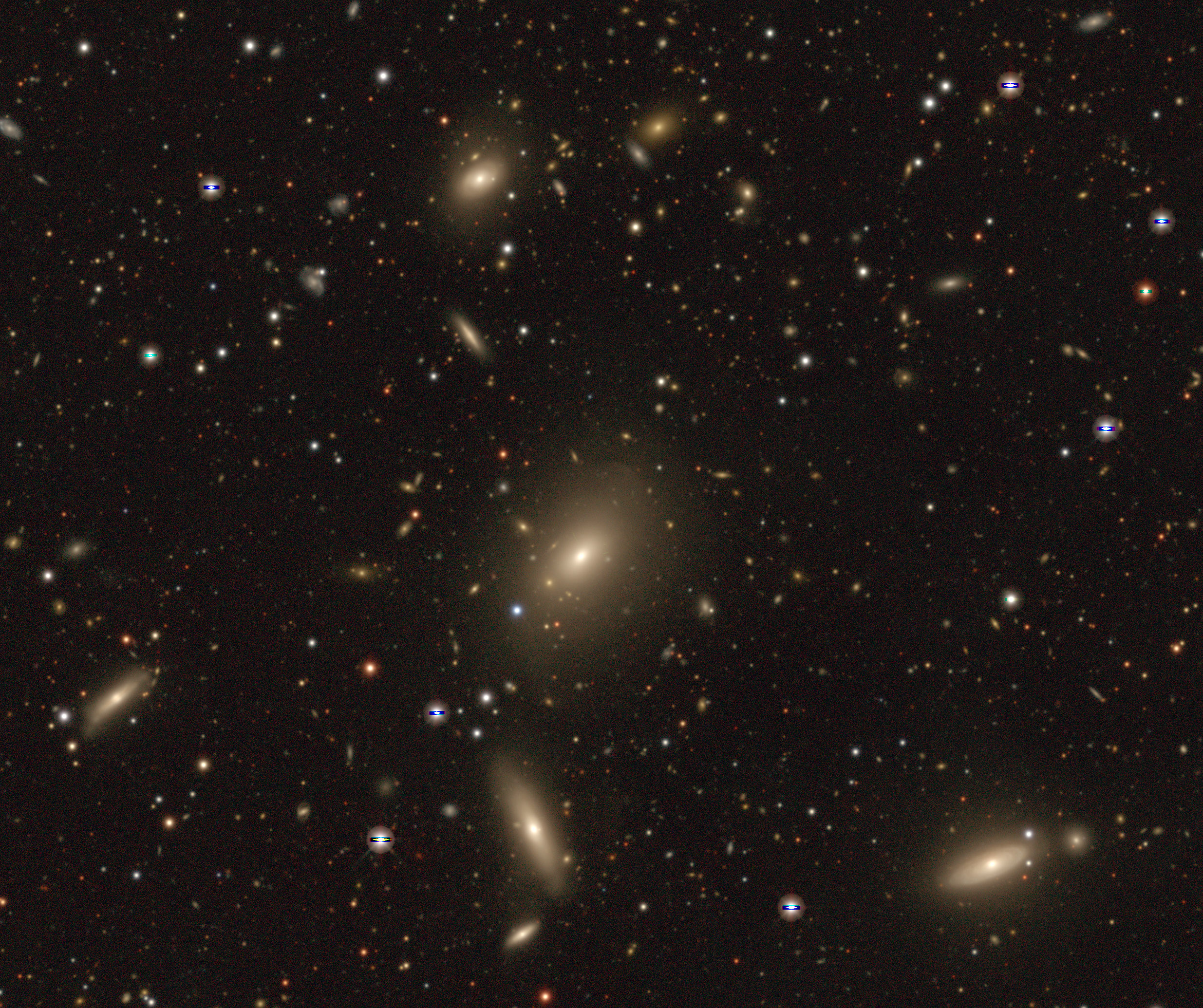
- The galaxy NGC 7061 (center) and surrounding galaxies.

Observation data (J2000 epoch)
- Constellation: Indus
- Right ascension: 21^{h} 27^{m} 26.8^{s}
- Declination: −49° 03′ 49″
- Redshift: 0.030037
- Heliocentric radial velocity: 9,005 km/s
- Distance: 390 Mly
- Apparent magnitude (V): 14.12

Characteristics
- Type: E4, cD4
- Apparent size (V): 1.2 x 0.7

Other designations
- ESO 236-13, AM 2123-491, PGC 66785

NGC 7061 is an elliptical galaxy located about 400 million light-years away in the constellation of Indus. NGC 7061 was discovered by astronomer John Herschel on September 30, 1834.

== See also ==
- NGC 7012
- List of NGC objects (7001–7840)
