= MACS J2211.7−0349 BCG =

Brightest cluster galaxy in the constellation Aquarius

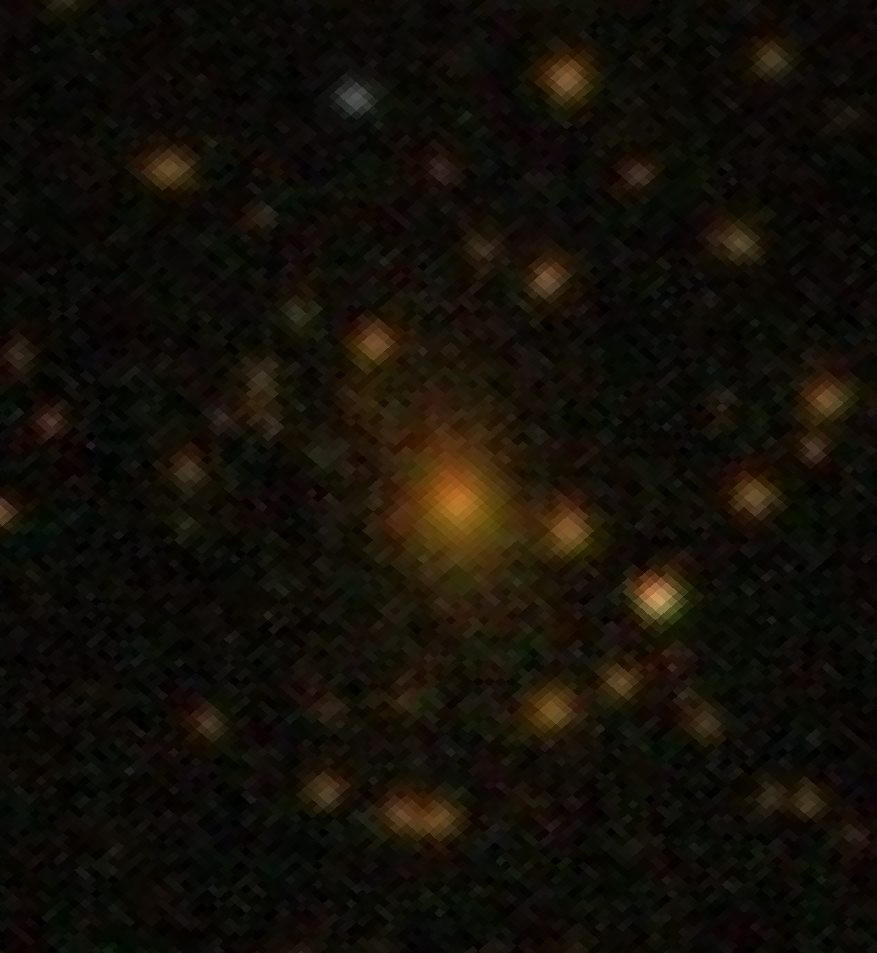
- SDSS image of MACS J2211.7-0349 BCG

Observation data (J2000.0 epoch)
- Constellation: Aquarius
- Right ascension: 22^{h} 11^{m} 45.90^{s}
- Declination: −03° 49′ 44.47″
- Redshift: 0.396000
- Heliocentric radial velocity: 118,718 ± 0 km/s
- Distance: 5,717.5 ± 400.2 Mly (1,753.00 ± 122.71 Mpc)
- Group or cluster: MACS J2211.7−0349 (RXC J2211.7−0350)
- Magnitude (J): 14.89

Characteristics
- Type: BrClG
- Size: ~796,000 ly (244.2 kpc) (estimated)

Other designations
- 2MASX J22114596−0349438, APMUKS(BJ) B220909.94−040434.6, SDSS J221145.91−034944.4, LEDA 3958078

MACS J2211.7−0349 BCG (Short for MACS J2211.7−0349 Brightest Cluster Galaxy) is a massive elliptical galaxy located in the constellation of Aquarius. The redshift of the galaxy is (z) 0.396 and it is the brightest cluster galaxy (BCG) of an X-ray luminous galaxy cluster, MACS J2211.7−0349, which is also known as RXC J2211.7−0350.

The total radio power of the galaxy is less than 23.71 W Hz^{−1}, while the total radio luminosity is less than 30.5 × 10^{38} keV s^{−1} Hz^{−1} at 1.4 GHz frequencies respectively. The estimated ellipticity of the BCG is e = 0.224 and it has a position angle of ɵ = 8.36. The BCG is also offset by 38.3 kiloparsecs from the X-ray cluster peak. The total flux density at 24 micrometer (ɥm) is 0.22 mJy, while the flux density at J-band is 0.87 mJy. The magnitude of the BCG is -26.35.

The total stellar mass of MACS J2211.7−0349 BCG is estimated to be 0.835 × 10^{12} M_{☉} based on a study of stellar masses of brightest cluster galaxies conducted in May 2016. Diffused radio emission originates from the BCG, with the source having a size of 220 kiloparsecs and a measured flux density of 0.58 ± 0.05 mJy.
