= XCS =

XCS may refer to:

- XMM Cluster Survey, a serendipitous X-ray galaxy cluster survey
- Cross-currency swap, an interest rate derivative
- XCS, the best known and best studied LCS algorithm
