= RXC J2211.7−0350 =

Galaxy cluster in the constellation Aquarius

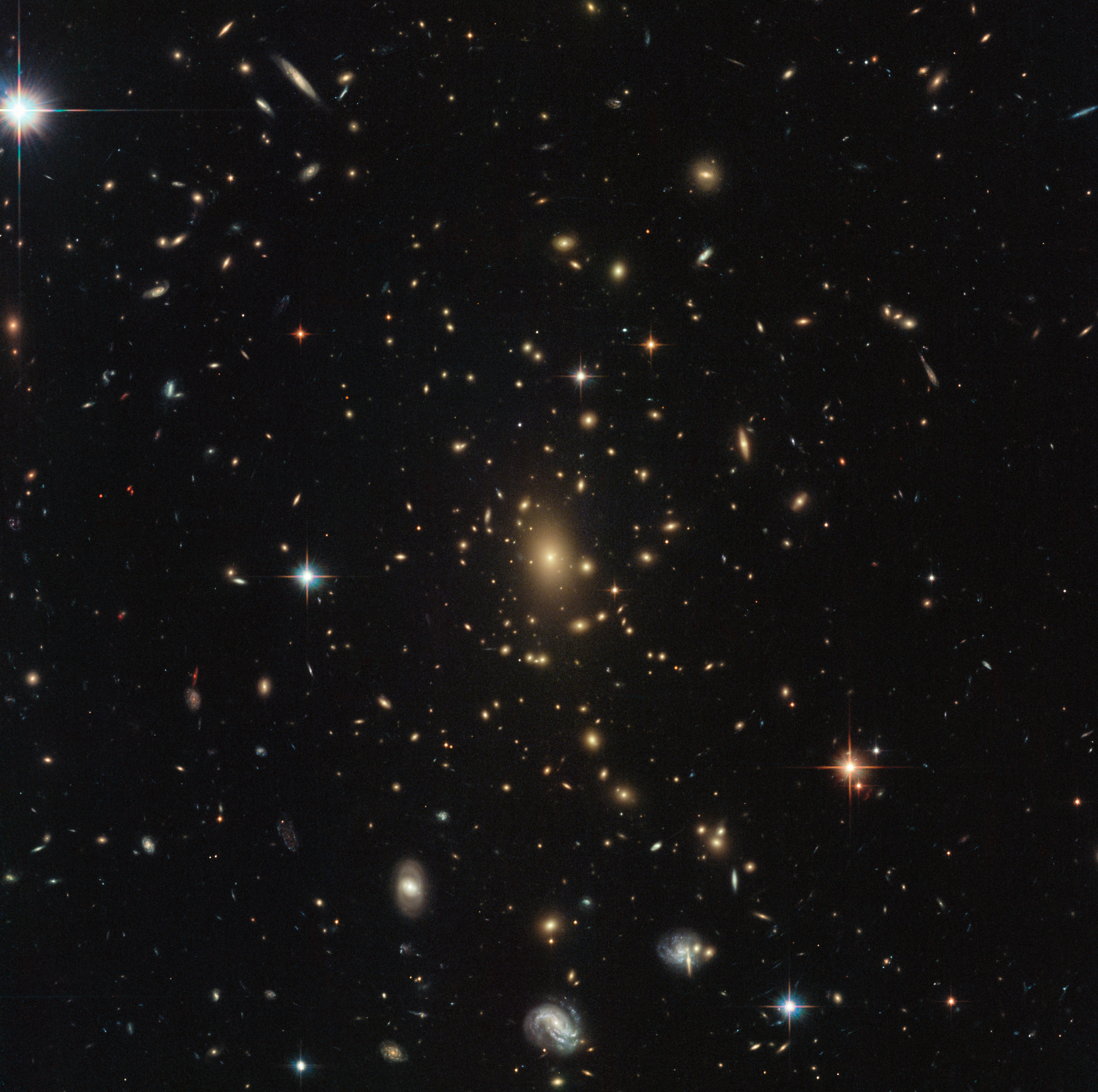
- RXC J2211.7−0350 taken by Hubble Space Telescope.

Observation data (Epoch J2000)
- Constellation: Aquarius
- Right ascension: 22^{h} 11^{m} 43.4^{s}
- Declination: −03° 50′ 07″
- Redshift: 0.3970

Other designations
- PSZ2 G057.25-45.34, MCXC J2211.7−0349, PSZ1 G057.28-45.37, RXC J2211.7−0349, MCS J2211.7−0349, PLCKESZ G057.26-45.35, [RRB2014] RM J221145.9−034944.5

RXC J2211.7−0350 is a cluster of galaxies. Galaxy clusters are the biggest objects in the Universe that are held together by gravity.

== See also ==
- Brightest cluster galaxy
- Galaxy groups
- Galaxy clusters
- List of galaxy clusters
