= NGC 600 =

Emission-line galaxy in the constellation Cetus

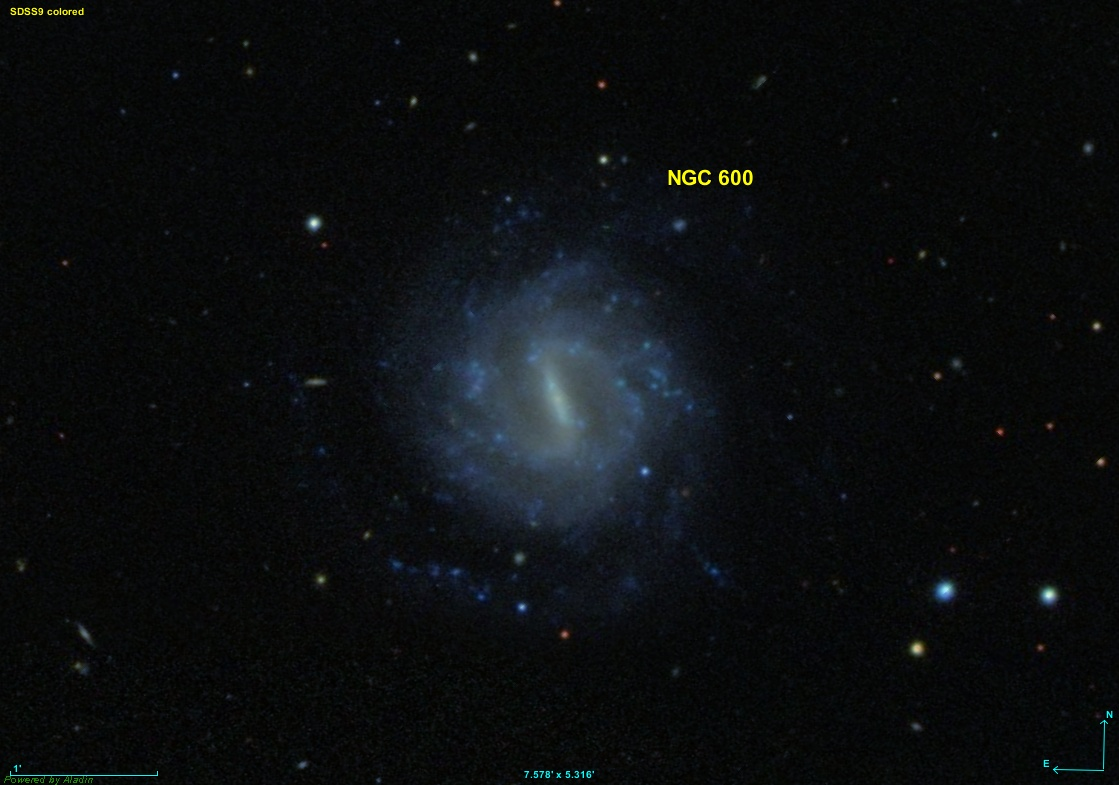
- SDSS image of NGC 600

Observation data (J2000 epoch)
- Constellation: Cetus
- Right ascension: 01^{h} 33^{m} 05.3^{s}
- Declination: −07° 18′ 41″
- Redshift: 0.006144 ± 0.000003
- Heliocentric radial velocity: 1842 km/s
- Distance: 92.7 Mly (28.41 Mpc)
- Group or cluster: [CHM2007] HDC 81, [T2015] nest 200207
- Apparent magnitude (V): 12.5±0.1
- Apparent magnitude (B): 13.1
- Absolute magnitude (V): −15.69

Characteristics
- Type: (R')SB(rs)d

Other designations
- MCG -01-05-007, PGC 5777

NGC 600 is an emission-line galaxy in the constellation Cetus. It was discovered by William Herschel on 10 September 1785. The galaxy has a diameter of 70,000 light-years. It is also approximately 90 million light-years from the Milky Way.

According to A.M. Garcia, NGC 600 belongs to LGG 27 or NGC 584 Group, which has 8 member galaxies, namely, NGC 586, NGC 584, NGC 596, NGC 615, NGC 636, MCG 1-4-44 and MCG 1-5-14.

== See also ==
- List of NGC objects
- List of NGC objects (1–1000)

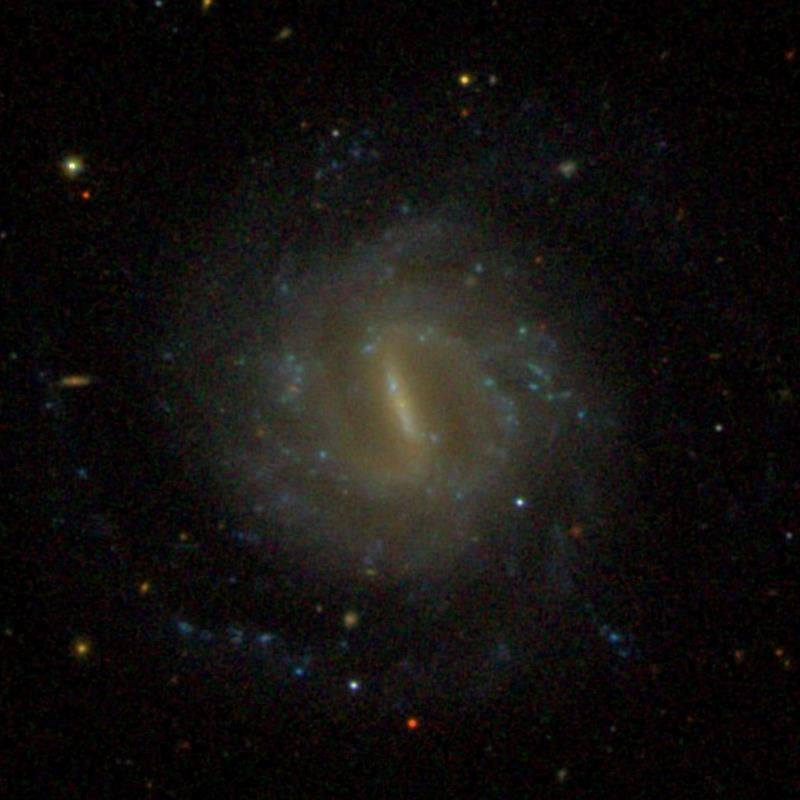
NGC 600 (SDSS DR14)
