= NGC 636 =

Elliptical galaxy in the constellation Cetus

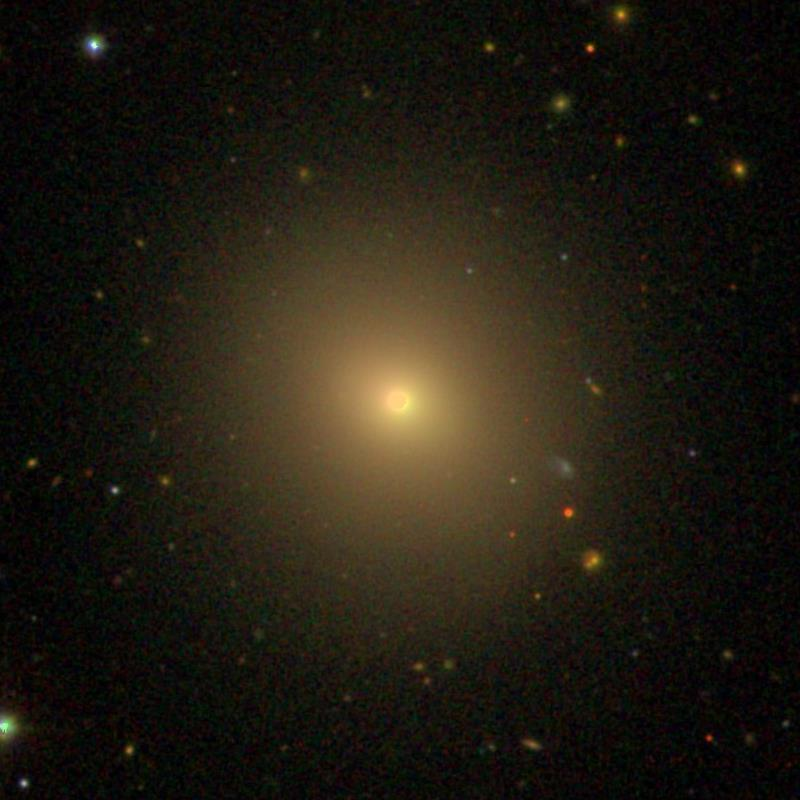
- SDSS image of NGC 636

Observation data (J2000 epoch)
- Constellation: Cetus
- Right ascension: 01^{h} 39^{m} 06.529^{s}
- Declination: −07° 30′ 45.37″
- Redshift: 0.006181
- Heliocentric radial velocity: 1847 km/s
- Distance: 95.8 Mly (29.38 Mpc)
- Apparent magnitude (B): 12.5

Characteristics
- Type: E3

Other designations
- MCG -01-05-013, PGC 6110

NGC 636 is an elliptical galaxy in the constellation Cetus. It is located about 96 million light-years from the Milky Way. It was discovered by the German–British astronomer William Herschel in 1785.

According to A.M. Garcia, NGC 636 belongs to LGG 27 or NGC 584 Group, which has 8 member galaxies, namely, NGC 586, NGC 596, NGC 600, NGC 615, NGC 584, MCG 1-4-44 and MCG 1-5-14.

== See also ==
- List of NGC objects (1–1000)
