= NGC 2997 =

Galaxy in the constellation Antlia

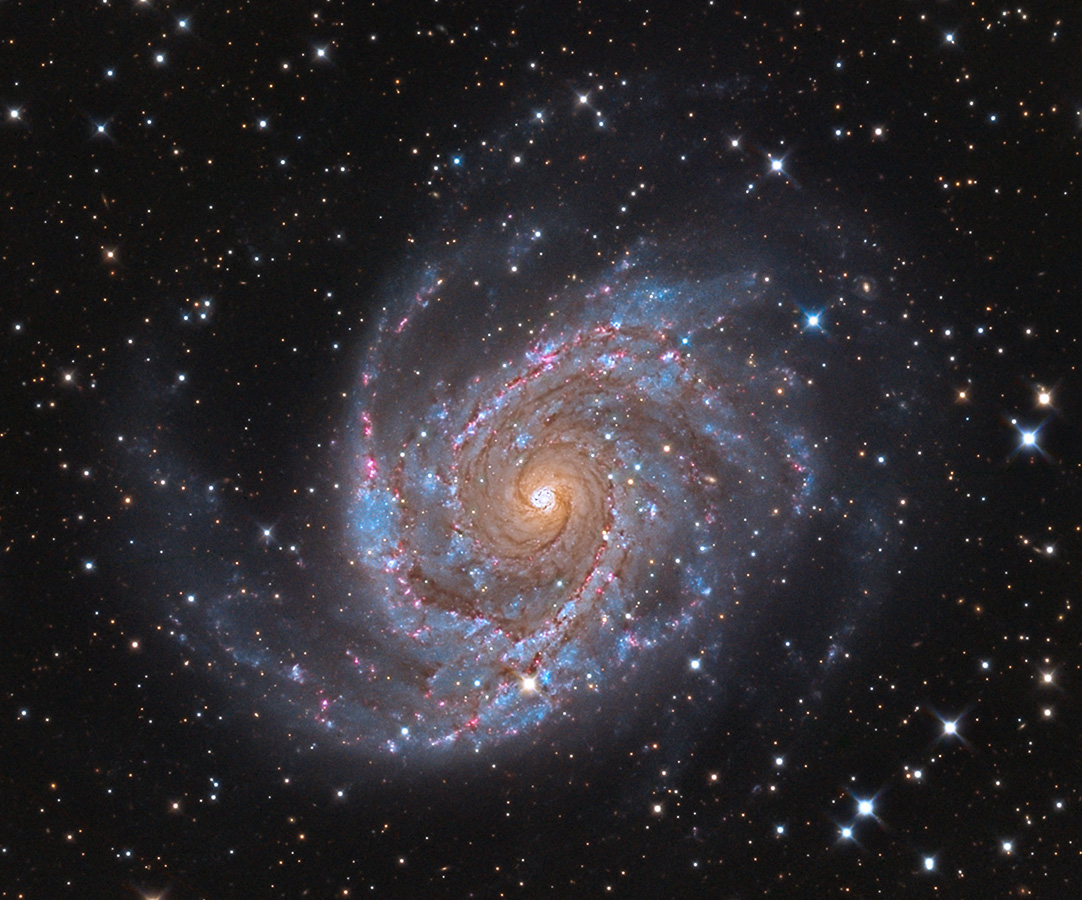
- NGC 2997

Observation data (J2000 epoch)
- Constellation: Antlia
- Right ascension: 09^{h} 45^{m} 38.75379^{s}
- Declination: −31° 11′ 27.3570″
- Heliocentric radial velocity: 1,088±2 km/s
- Distance: 39.8 megalight-years (12.2 Mpc)
- Group or cluster: NGC 2997 group
- Apparent magnitude (V): 10.1

Characteristics
- Type: SAB(rs)c or Sc(s)I.3
- Size: 120,000 ly (36.65 kpc) (estimated)
- Apparent size (V): 8′.9 × 6′.8

Other designations
- ESO 434-35, AM 0943-305, NGC 2997, UGCA 181, MCG -05-23-012, PGC 27978

NGC 2997 is a face-on unbarred spiral galaxy about 40 million light-years away in the faint southern constellation of Antlia. It was discovered by German-born astronomer William Herschel on 4 March 1793. J. L. E. Dreyer described it as, "a remarkable object, very faint, very large, very gradually then very suddenly bright middle and 4 arcsec nucleus. This is the brightest galaxy of the NGC 2997 group of galaxies, and was featured on the cover of the first edition of Galactic Dynamics by James Binney and Scott Tremaine.

This is a grand-design galaxy with a symmetrical, two-armed form. The morphological classification of NGC 2997 is SAB(rs)c, indicating a weakly-barred spiral galaxy (SAB) with an incomplete ring around the bar (rs) and loosely-wound spiral arms (c). It is inclined at an angle of 40° to the line of sight from the Earth, with the major axis aligned along a position angle of 110°. The arms host a series of dusty knots that are star-forming regions being generated through gas compression from density waves. At the core, the arms converge to form a circumnuclear ring with symmetrically-placed hot spots containing super star clusters.

== Supernovae ==
Two supernovae have been detected in NGC 2997.

- SN 2003jg (Type Ib/c, mag. 17) was discovered by the Perth Automated Supernova Search using CCD images taken on 24 October 2003. The supernova was positioned 11″ east and 6″ north of the galactic nucleus.
- SN 2008eh (type unknown, mag. 15.1) was discovered by Berto Monard on 21 July 2008, reaching maximum magnitude 15.0. It was positioned 123″ east and 34″ north of the galactic core.

== See also ==
- Pinwheel Galaxy
- Whirlpool Galaxy
- Fireworks Galaxy
