= NGC 7012 =

Galaxy in the constellation Microscopium

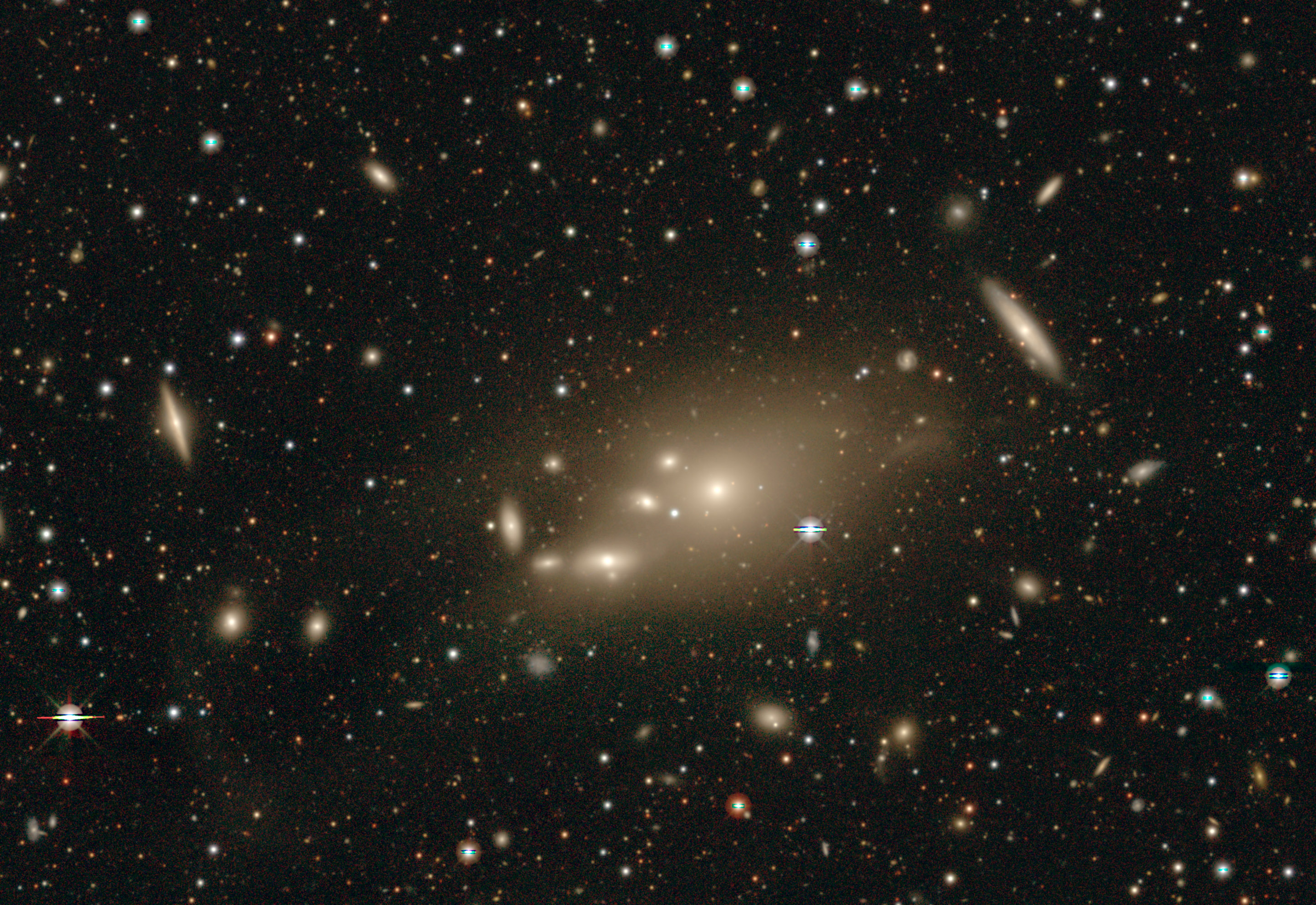
- In this picture by the legacy surveys, NGC 7012 is surrounded by smaller galaxies. The star TYC 7977-850-1 is also visible at the lower right.

Observation data (J2000 epoch)
- Constellation: Microscopium
- Right ascension: 21^{h} 06^{m} 45.5^{s}
- Declination: −44° 48′ 53″
- Redshift: 0.029347
- Heliocentric radial velocity: 8,798 km/s
- Distance: 380 Mly (117 Mpc)
- Apparent magnitude (V): 13.65
- Absolute magnitude (B): -23.53 ± 0.51

Characteristics
- Type: cD4 pec
- Size: ~540,600 ly (165.75 kpc) (estimated)
- Apparent size (V): 2.5 x 1.4

Other designations
- ESO 286-51, AM 2103-450, PGC 66116

NGC 7012 is a large, bright elliptical galaxy located about 380 million light-years away from Earth in the constellation Microscopium. NGC 7012 was discovered by astronomer John Herschel on July 1, 1834. NGC 7012 is host to a supermassive black hole with an estimated mass of 4.5 billion M_{☉}. NGC 7012 is very large galaxy, with an estimated diameter of nearly 550,000 light years.

== Abell S0921 ==
NGC 7012 is the brightest member in the center of a small compact group of interacting galaxies known as Abell S0921. Due to it also being the dominant member of the group, NGC 7012 is classified as a Cd galaxy. The group has about seven major galaxies with many other more distant, fainter galaxies that are probably also associated.

== See also ==
- Elliptical galaxy
- List of NGC objects (7001–7840)
- List of galaxy groups and clusters
- List of largest galaxies
