= NGC 615 =

Galaxy in the constellation Cetus

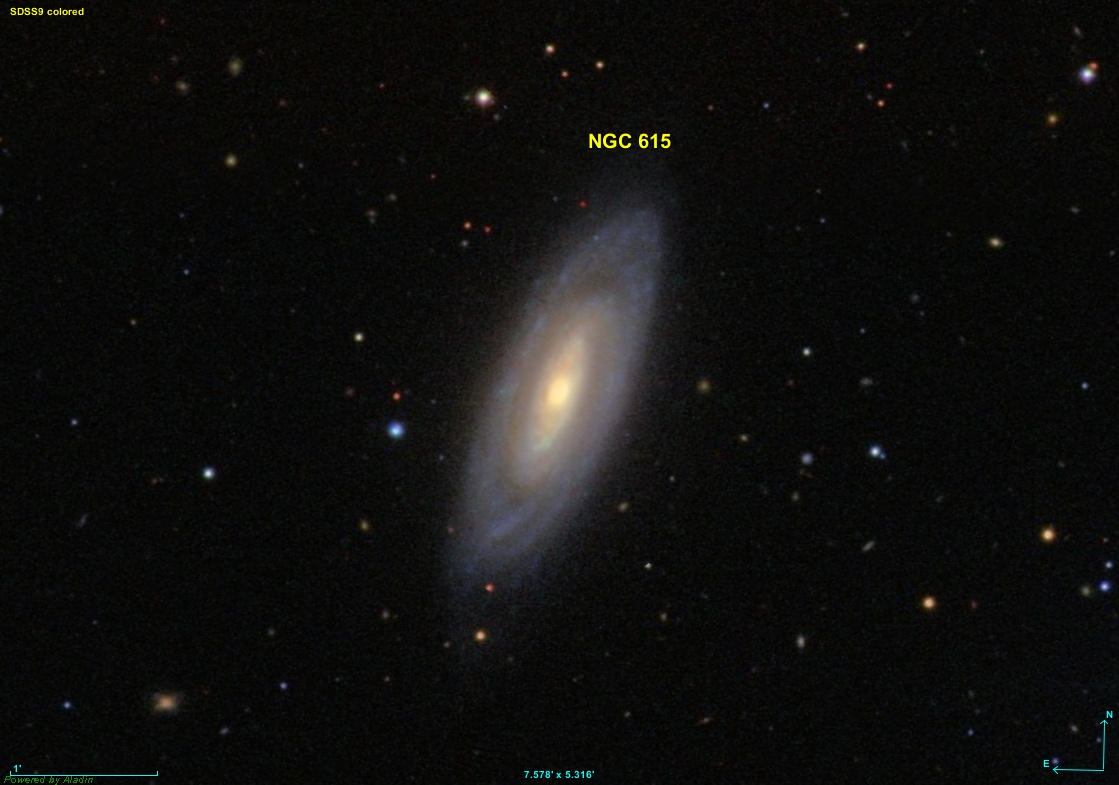
- NGC 615 as seen by SDSS

Observation data (J2000 epoch)
- Constellation: Cetus
- Right ascension: 01^{h} 35^{m} 05.7^{s} 0
- Declination: −07° 20′ 25″
- Redshift: 0.006164±0.000017
- Heliocentric radial velocity: 1,848±5 km/s
- Distance: 85 ± 11 Mly (26.1 ± 3.4 Mpc)
- Apparent magnitude (V): 11.7

Characteristics
- Type: SA(rs)b
- Apparent size (V): 2.7′ × 0.9′

Other designations
- MCG -01-05-008, PGC 5897

NGC 615 is an unbarred spiral galaxy seen at an angle of 60°, located in the constellation of Cetus. It is located at a distance of circa 70 million light years from Earth, which, given its apparent dimensions, means that NGC 615 is about 75,000 light years across. It was discovered by William Herschel on January 10, 1785.

The galaxy is included in the Herschel 400 Catalogue. It lies about three degrees northeast from Theta Ceti.

== Characteristics ==
The galaxy has been found to possess a chemically and dynamically decoupled nucleus. Further observations revealed two decoupled components, with the outer one identified as a disk. In the centre of the galaxy (<3" / 0.3 kpc) was found to exist an inclined circumnuclear disk. The stars in the circumnuclear disk have solar metallicity and their median age was determined at 5 billion years. In the bulge of NGC 615 (3"-6") was detected a counterrotating gaseous component.

Further away of the centre (8-30") lies the inner decoupled component, where stars and gas rotate together. The axis of the photometric component is turned and thus it was identified as a separate inner compact disk of oval shape. This disk contains HII regions, with the most prominent of them in Hα imaging being a pair located symmetrically with respect to the nucleus at the radius of 20"-23". The mean stellar age in the inner disk outside the HII regions is 5 billion years. The presence of a chemically decoupled nucleus and inner disk suggests a secondary burst of star formation, perhaps provoked by the close passage of another galaxy some gigayears ago.

The outer disk demonstrates a pair of low-contrast outer spiral arms or, more likely, a ring. Its inclination with respect to the line of sight is no more than 60°.

== Galaxy group and environment ==
According to A.M. Garcia, NGC 615 belongs to LGG 27 or NGC 584 Group, which has 8 member galaxies, namely, NGC 586, NGC 596, NGC 600, NGC 584, NGC 636, MCG 1-4-44 and MCG 1-5-14.

NGC 615 belongs to the NGC 584 galaxy group, which also includes the galaxies NGC 584, NGC 596, NGC 600, and NGC 636.
