= NGC 596 =

Elliptical galaxy in the constellation Cetus

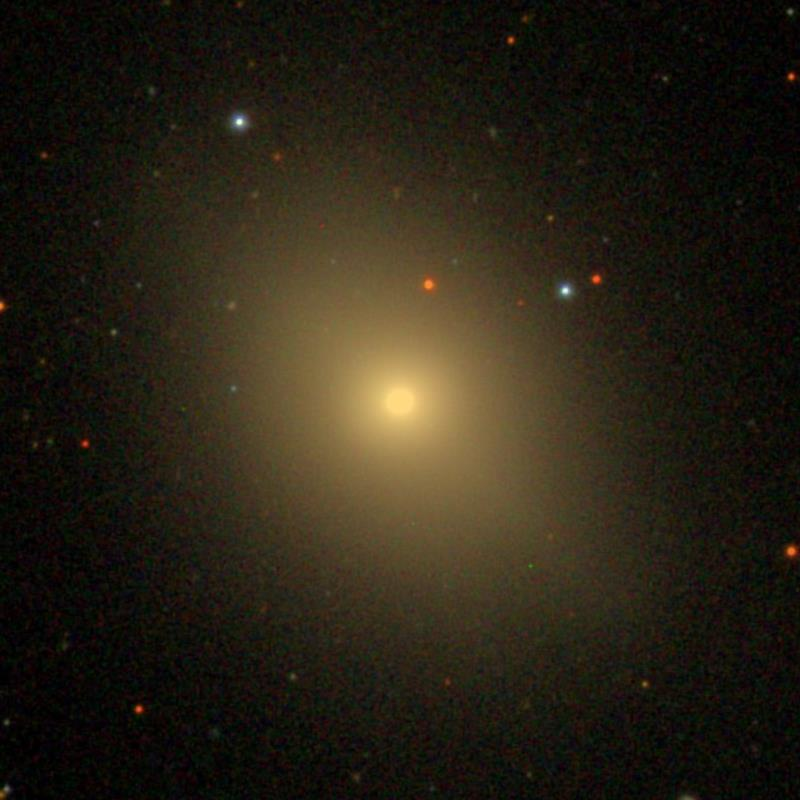
- SDSS image of NGC 596

Observation data (J2000 epoch)
- Constellation: Cetus
- Right ascension: 01^{h} 32^{m} 52.1^{s}
- Declination: −07° 01′ 55″
- Redshift: 1,876±11 km/s
- Distance: 67 ± 13 Mly (20.5 ± 4.0 Mpc)
- Apparent magnitude (V): 10.9

Characteristics
- Type: E+ pec
- Apparent size (V): 3.2′ × 2.0′

Other designations
- MCG -01-05-005, PGC 5766

NGC 596 is an elliptical galaxy in the constellation Cetus. The galaxy lies 65 million light years away from Earth, which means, given its apparent dimensions, that NGC 596 is approximately 60,000 light years across. The galaxy shows an outer envelope and is a merger remnant. The surface brightness profile is smooth and featureless. The galaxy hosts a supermassive black hole, whose mass is estimated to be 170 million (10^{8.24}) $\begin{smallmatrix}M_\odot\end{smallmatrix}$.

== Galaxy Group and Environment ==
NGC 596 belongs at the NGC 584 galaxy group, which also includes the galaxies NGC 584, which lies 25 minutes to the northwest, NGC 600, NGC 615 and NGC 636.

According to A.M. Garcia, NGC 596 belongs to LGG 27 or NGC 584 Group, which has 8 member galaxies, namely, NGC 586, NGC 584, NGC 600, NGC 615, NGC 636, MCG 1-4-44 and MCG 1-5-14.

The galaxy is included in the Herschel 400 Catalogue. It lies about 2 and half degrees northeast from theta Ceti.
