= A2744z7p9OD =

Galaxy protocluster in constellation Sculptor

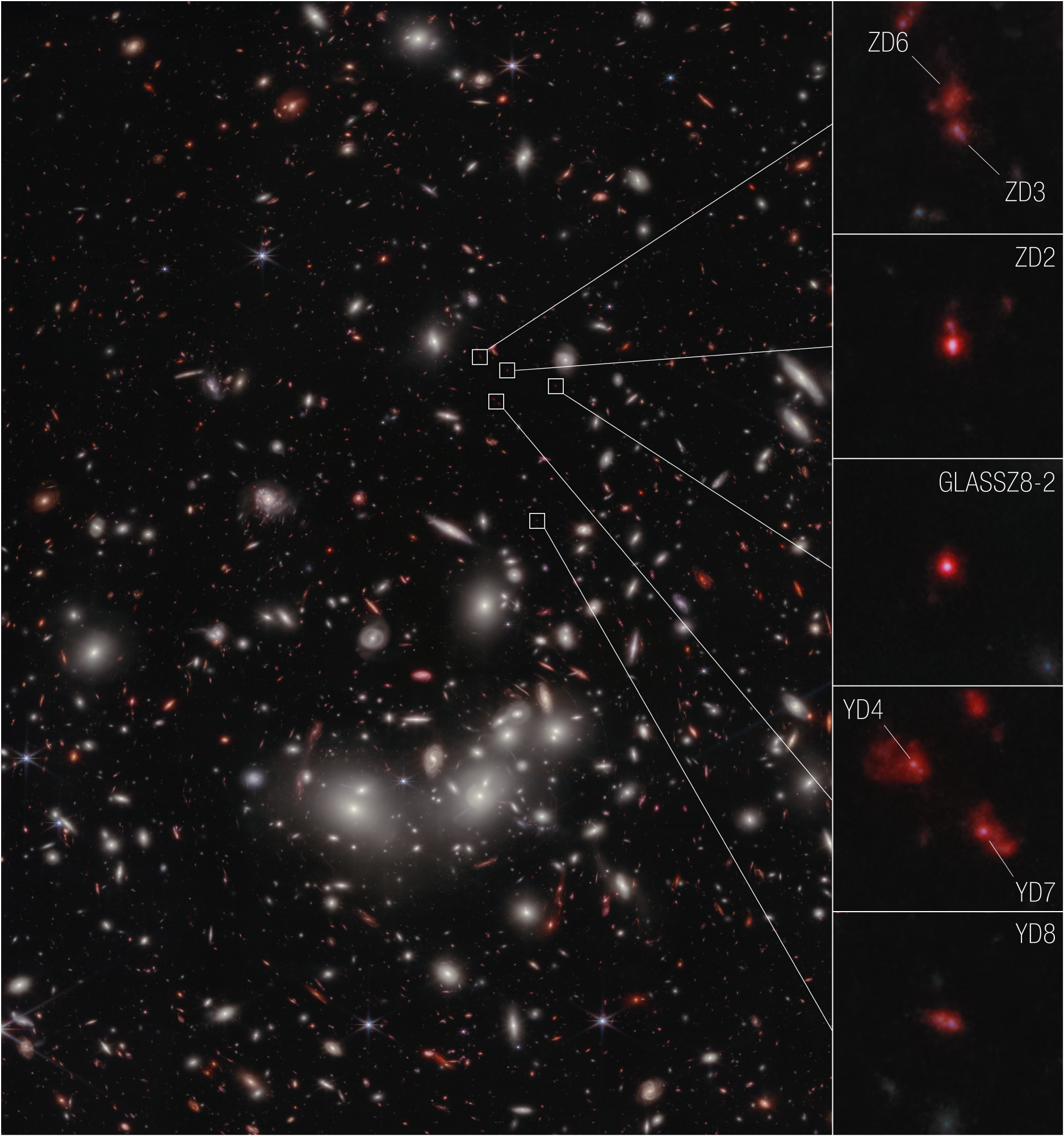

Observation data (Epoch )
- Constellation: Sculptor
- Right ascension: 00^{h} 14^{m} 18.25^{s}
- Declination: −30° 22′ 46″
- Number of galaxies: 7
- Redshift: 7.88
- Binding mass: 2x10^15 (halo mass) M_{☉}

A2744z7p9OD is the highest redshift spectroscopically confirmed galaxy protocluster discovered to date. The cluster is located behind the Abell 2744 cluster at a redshift distance of z=7.88. It has a radius of 60 kiloparsecs and within that lies seven currently discovered galaxies making it an overdense region of galaxies. It lacks any strong confirmed Lyman-Alpha emissions.

Theses protoclusters like A2744z7p9OD resemble what large clusters like the Coma cluster started out as, just with tens of galaxies instead of thousands of galaxies modern large clusters have. Theses clusters reveal how early clusters in the early universe evolved and changed over time.

== Environment ==
It is thought that A2744z7p9OD has a highly neutral environment. In such highly neutral environments, it is expected that large ionizing bubbles are extremely rare even in regions of high overdensity.

== List of galaxies ==
Below is a list of galaxies located in the A2744z7p9OD protocluster. Galaxies confirmed spectroscopically and photometriclly are included.

=== Spectroscopically confirmed ===
1. YD4
2. YD7
3. ZD6
4. YD8
5. ZD2
6. ZD3
7. GLASSZ8-2

=== Photometric sample ===
1. YD3
2. YD6
3. ZD1
4. ZD4
5. ZD5
6. ZD7
7. ZD9
8. ZD10
