= NGC 2997 Group =

Galaxy group in the constellation Antlia

NGC 2997 group of galaxies
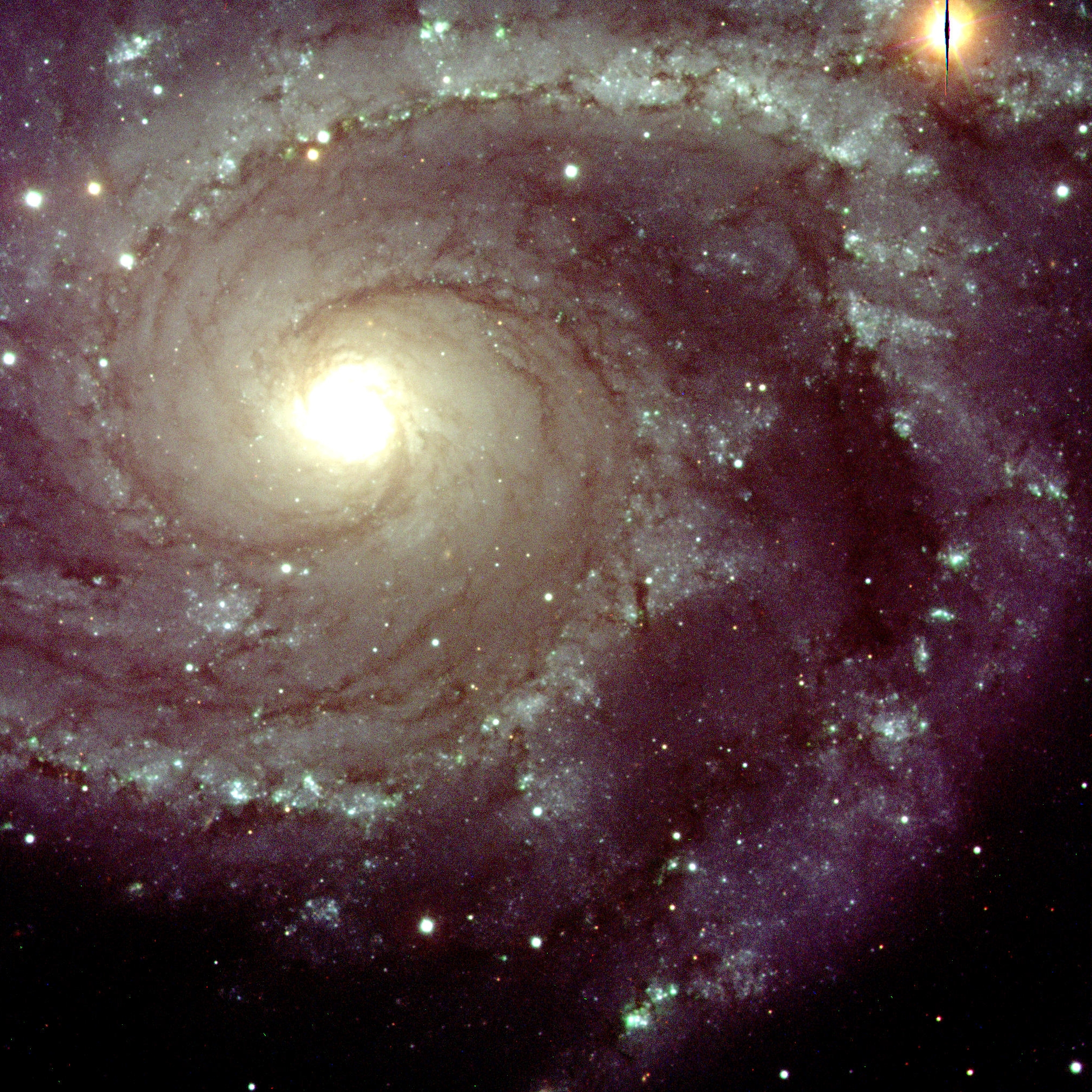

Observation data (Epoch )
- Constellation(s): Hydra / Antlia
- Right ascension: 09^{h} 43^{m} 54.7^{s}
- Declination: −31° 31′ 10″
- Distance: 24.8 million
- Notable features: NGC 2997

The NGC 2997 group is a group of galaxies about 24.8 million light-years from Earth containing NGC 2997 as a member. It is a group in the Local Supercluster along with the Local Group.
