= CL0024+17 =

Cluster of galaxies in the constellation of Pisces

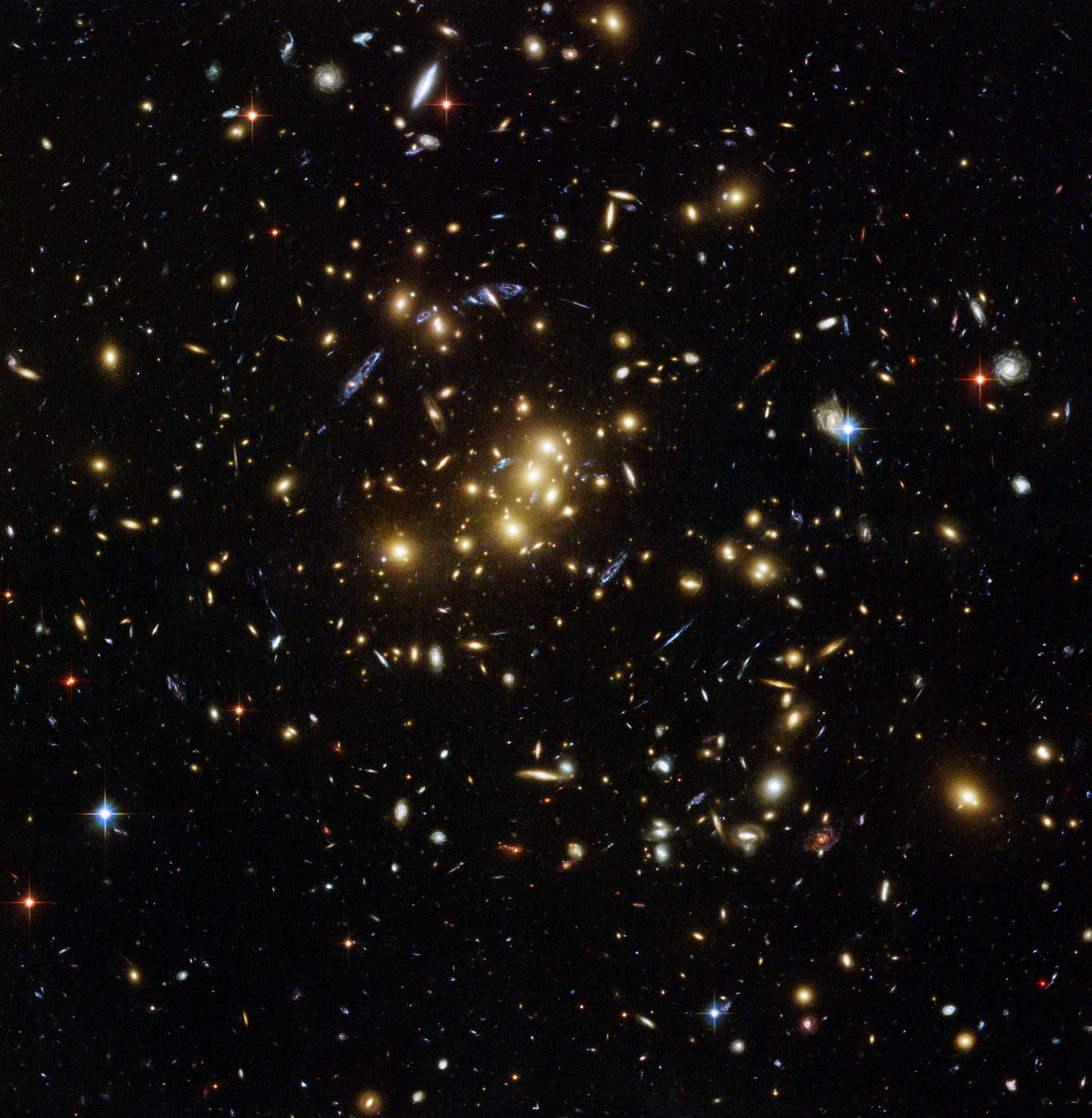
- The CL0024+17 cluster of galaxies Credit: NASA/ESA/HST

Observation data (Epoch J2000)
- Constellation: Pisces
- Right ascension: 0^{h} 26^{m} 35^{s}
- Declination: +17° 9′ 43″
- Redshift: 0.39
- Binding mass: 8.1×10^{14} M_{☉}

Other designations
- ZwCl 0024+1652

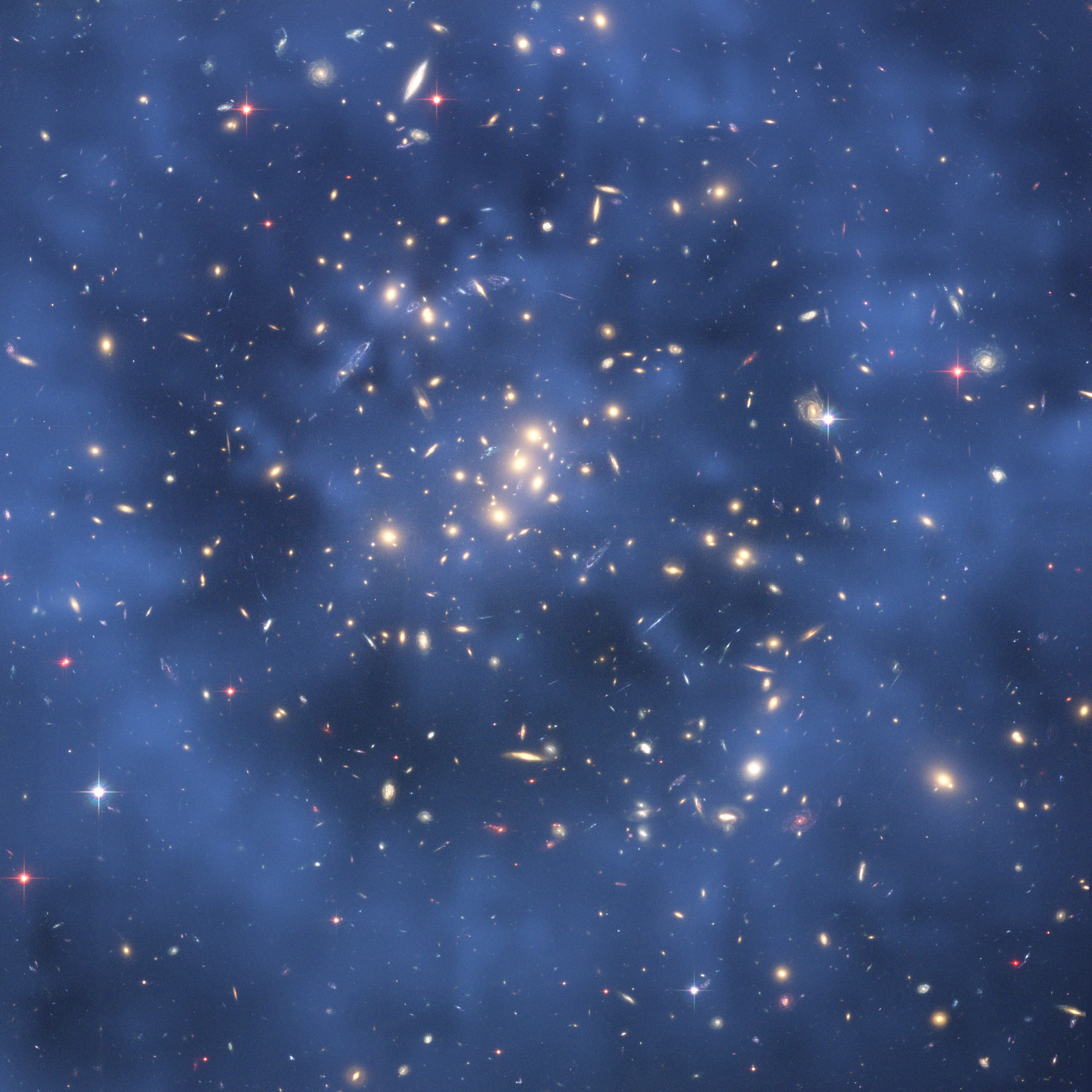
The gravity map is superimposed on a Hubble image of the cluster CL0024+17. Credit: NASA/ESA/HST

CL0024+17, or CL0024+1654, is a cluster of galaxies located in the constellation Pisces, and about 4 billion light years distant. It appears as a concentration of yellow elliptical and spiral type galaxies. It has a radius of 0.54 mpc and a mass of 8.1x10^14 solar masses. The cluster's large mass gravitationally lensed a background galaxy, creating eight well-resolved images of this galaxy.

Cl 0024+17 is allowing astronomers to probe the distribution of dark matter in space. The blue streaks near the center of the image are the smeared images of very distant galaxies that are not part of the cluster. The distant galaxies appear distorted because their light is being bent and magnified by the powerful gravity of Cl 0024+17, an effect called gravitational lensing.

Because dark matter does not shine or reflect light, it cannot be seen. Astronomers can only detect its influence by how its gravity affects light. By mapping the distorted light created by gravitational lensing, astronomers can trace how dark matter is distributed in the cluster. While mapping the dark matter, astronomers found a dark-matter ring near the cluster's center (although this is disputed by other independent studies). The ring's discovery is among the strongest evidence that dark matter exists.

Excluding mass concentrations centered on the visible galaxies, more than 98% of the remaining mass in the cluster is represented by dark matter. This dark matter is centered near the brightest galaxies of the cluster. The distribution of this dark matter far more smoother and symmetrical than predicted in CDM cosmologies such as Omega-1 and Omega-0.3.
