= CL J1001+0220 =

Galaxy cluster in the constellation Sextans

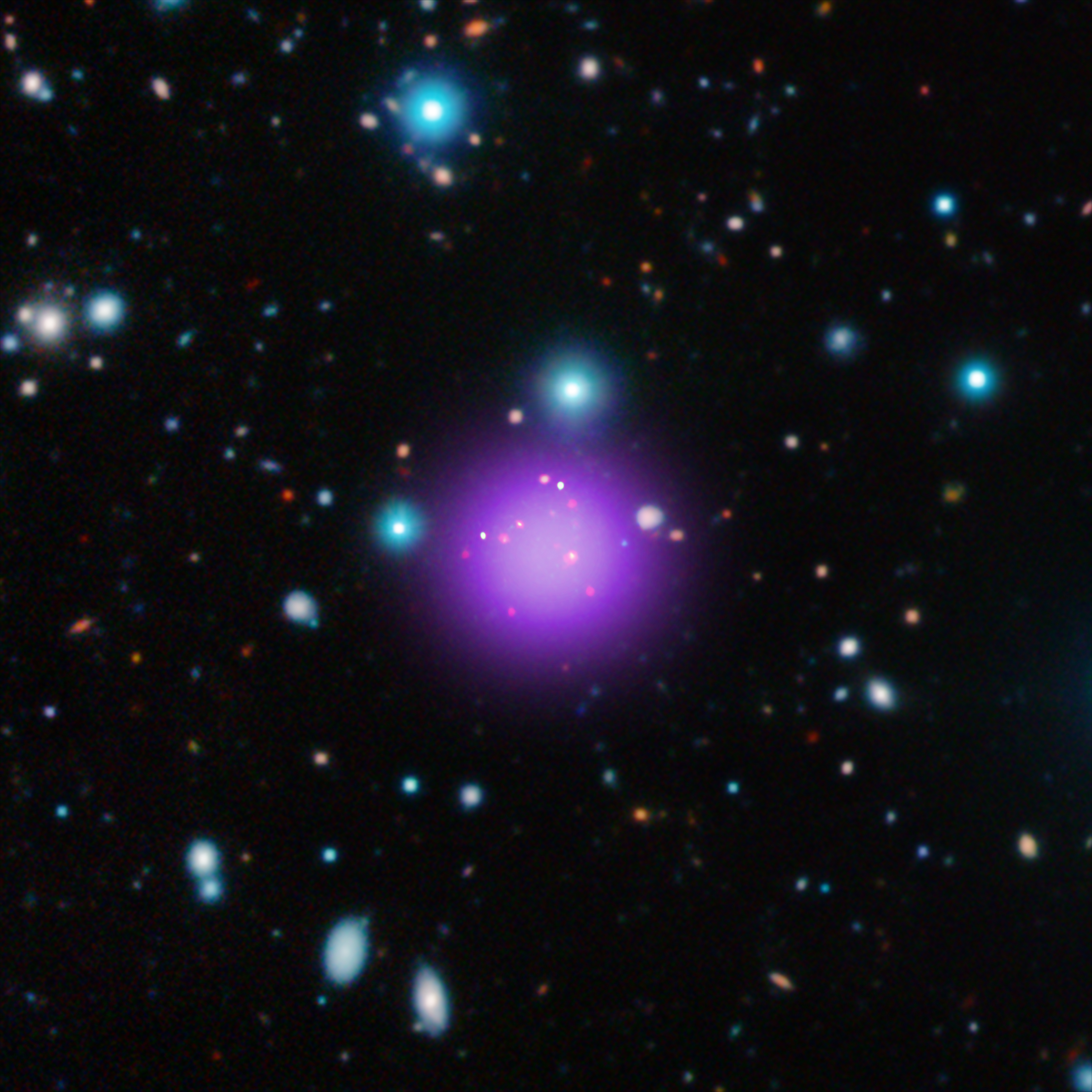
- Composite of X-ray imagery of CL J1001+0220 from Chandra X-ray Observatory (shown in purple), Infrared from UltraVISTA (shown in red), and radio from Atacama Large Millimeter Array (in blue and green)

Observation data (Epoch J2000)
- Constellation: Sextans
- Right ascension: 10^{h} 00^{m} 56.96^{s}
- Declination: +02° 20′ 09.32″
- Number of galaxies: 17
- Redshift: 2.506
- Distance: 3.40 Gpc (11.1 billion light-years).

CL J1001+0220 is, as of 2026, the most distant known galaxy cluster. Discovered in 2016 by the Chandra X-ray Observatory in conjunction with the ESO's UltraVISTA telescope and the Atacama Large Millimeter Array, it has a redshift of z=2.506, placing it at a distance of 11.1 billion light-years from Earth. The galaxy cluster appears to be undergoing the transformation from a galaxy cluster that is still forming, a proto-cluster, to a mature cluster, and it is the first such cluster observed in this stage of its evolution.

The cluster consists of seventeen galaxies, and nine of the eleven massive galaxies closest to its center are starburst galaxies which together are forming new stars at the rate of about 3,400 solar masses (M_{☉}) per year. In contrast, the Milky Way produces only the equivalent of one solar mass per year, so these galaxies at the core of the cluster are producing stars at a rate three thousand times greater than the Milky Way on average. Other galaxy clusters at ten billion light years and closer have far less star formation, and this suggests that star formation slows down in large galaxies within clusters after the galaxies have already come together during the development of a galaxy cluster.
