= NGC 584 =

Galaxy in the constellation Cetus

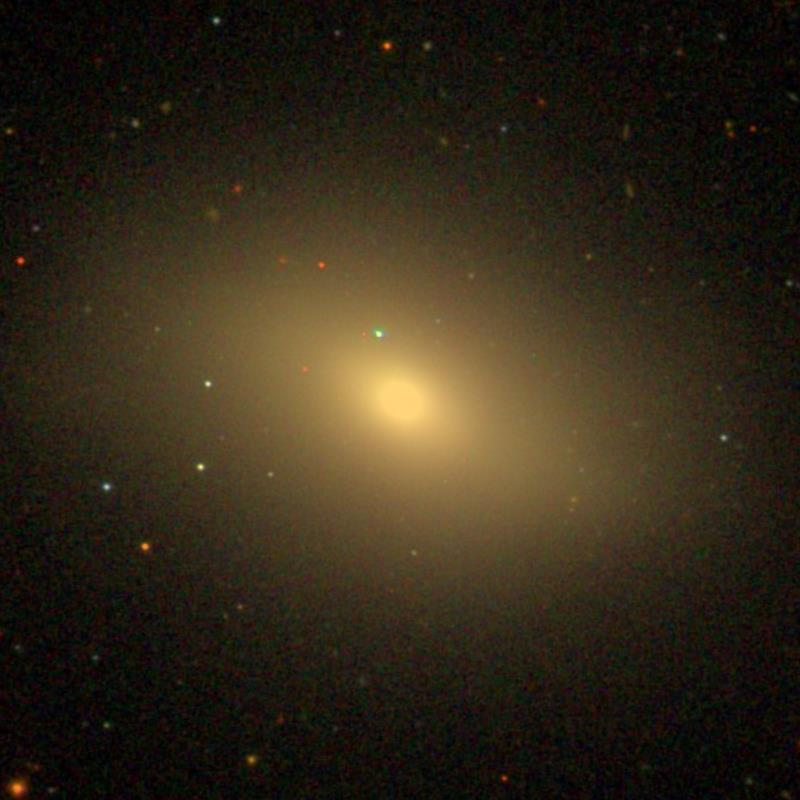
- SDSS image of NGC 584

Observation data (J2000 epoch)
- Constellation: Cetus
- Right ascension: 01^{h} 31^{m} 20.755^{s}
- Declination: −06° 52′ 05.02″
- Redshift: 0.006011
- Heliocentric radial velocity: 1802
- Distance: 62.28 ± 10.84 Mly (19.094 ± 3.323 Mpc)
- Apparent magnitude (V): 10.5
- Apparent magnitude (B): 11.44

Characteristics
- Type: E4
- Apparent size (V): 2.983' × 1.850'

Other designations
- IC 1712, MCG-01-04-060, PGC 5663

NGC 584 is an elliptical galaxy in the constellation Cetus. The galaxy was discovered on 10 September 1785 by the German-British astronomer William Herschel.

It is about 20 megaparsecs (60 million light-years) distant.

== Galaxy Group ==
NGC 584 belongs to the NGC 584 galaxy group, which also includes the galaxies NGC 596, NGC 600, NGC 615 and NGC 636.

According to A.M. Garcia, NGC 584 belongs to LGG 27 or NGC 584 Group, which has 8 member galaxies, namely, NGC 586, NGC 596, NGC 600, NGC 615, NGC 636, MCG 1-4-44 and MCG 1-5-14.

== See also ==
- List of galaxies
- Comet Galaxy
