= MS 1512-cB58 =

Galaxy in the constellation Boötes

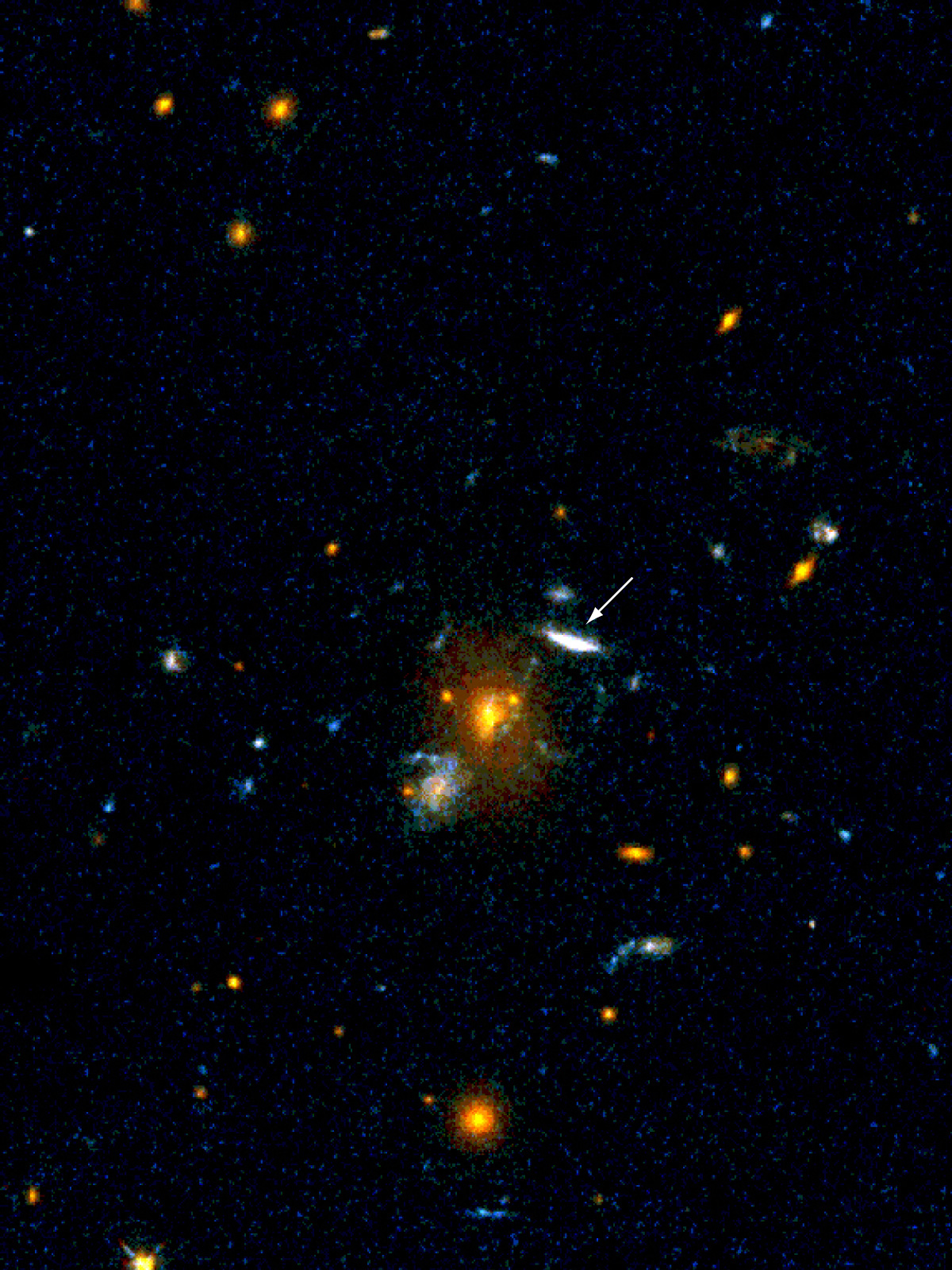
- MS 1512-cB58 indicated with an arrow as observed by the Hubble Space Telescope

Observation data (J2000 epoch)
- Constellation: Boötes
- Right ascension: 15^{h} 14^{m} 22.2751^{s}
- Declination: +36° 36′ 25.674″
- Redshift: 2.7233 ± 0.0005
- Distance: 10,925 Gly (3,349.6 Gpc) (Light travel distance) 19,580 Gly (6,003 Gpc) (Comoving distance)
- Apparent magnitude (V): 20.31

Characteristics
- Type: Sb-Sc
- Notable features: cD galaxy of the cluster ClG 1512+36

Other designations
- CNOC MS 1512 101094, FIRST J151422.4+363620, Galaxy 1512-cB58, Galaxy cB 58, Galaxy cB58, MS 1512-cB58, RGB J1514+366, RX J1514.4+3636, SHV2006 1259

MS 1512-cB58 is a galaxy in the constellation Boötes. It is a starburst galaxy that is being strongly gravitationally lensed, magnifying its apparent size by 30−50 times.
