= XMM Cluster Survey =

The XMM Cluster Survey (XCS) is a serendipitous X-ray galaxy cluster survey being conducted using archival data taken by ESA’s XMM-Newton satellite. Galaxy clusters trace the large scale structure of the universe, and their number density evolution with redshift provides a way to measure cosmological parameters, independent of cosmic microwave background experiments or supernovae cosmology projects.

The collaboration is based in the United Kingdom and this is also where the majority of researchers are based. However, there are members of the collaboration across Europe and the Atlantic.

== Science Goals ==
- Derivation of cosmological parameters
- Measurement of X-ray scaling relations and their evolution
- Galaxy evolution in dense environments
- Properties of unusual (non cluster) X-ray sources, such as high redshift quasars and isolated neutron stars.

== Achievements ==
The XCS collaboration have detected 503 clusters serendipitously in XMM-Newton observations.

== Publications ==
- Mehrtens, Nicola; Kathy Romer, A.; Lloyd-Davies, E. J.; Hilton, Matt; Miller, Christopher J.; Stanford, S. A.; Hosmer, Mark; Hoyle, Ben; Collins, Chris A.; Liddle, Andrew R.; Viana, Pedro T. P.; Nichol, Robert C.; Stott, John P.; Naomi Dubois, E.; Kay, Scott T.; Sahlen, Martin; Young, Owain; Short, C. J.; Christodoulou, L.; Watson, William A.; Davidson, Michael; Harrison, CraigD.; Baruah, Leon; Smith, Mathew; Burke, Claire; Deadman, Paul-James; Rooney, Philip J.; Edmondson, Edward M.; West, Michael; et al. (2011). "The XMM Cluster Survey: Optical analysis methodology and the first data release". Monthly Notices of the Royal Astronomical Society. 423 (2): 1024. arXiv:1106.3056. Bibcode:2012MNRAS.423.1024M. doi:10.1111/j.1365-2966.2012.20931.x.
- Lloyd-Davies, E. J.; Kathy Romer, A.; Mehrtens, Nicola; Hosmer, Mark; Davidson, Michael; Sabirli, Kivanc; Mann, Robert G.; Hilton, Matt; Liddle, Andrew R.; Viana, Pedro T. P.; Campbell, Heather C.; Collins, Chris A.; Naomi Dubois, E.; Freeman, Peter; Harrison, Craig D.; Hoyle, Ben; Kay, Scott T.; Kuwertz, Emma; Miller, Christopher J.; Nichol, Robert C.; Sahlen, Martin; Stanford, S. A.; Stott, John P. (2010). "The XMM Cluster Survey: X-ray analysis methodology". Monthly Notices of the Royal Astronomical Society. 418 (1): 14–53. arXiv:1010.0677. Bibcode:2011MNRAS.418...14L. doi:10.1111/j.1365-2966.2011.19117.x.
