= NGC 7319 =

Galaxy in the constellation Pegasus

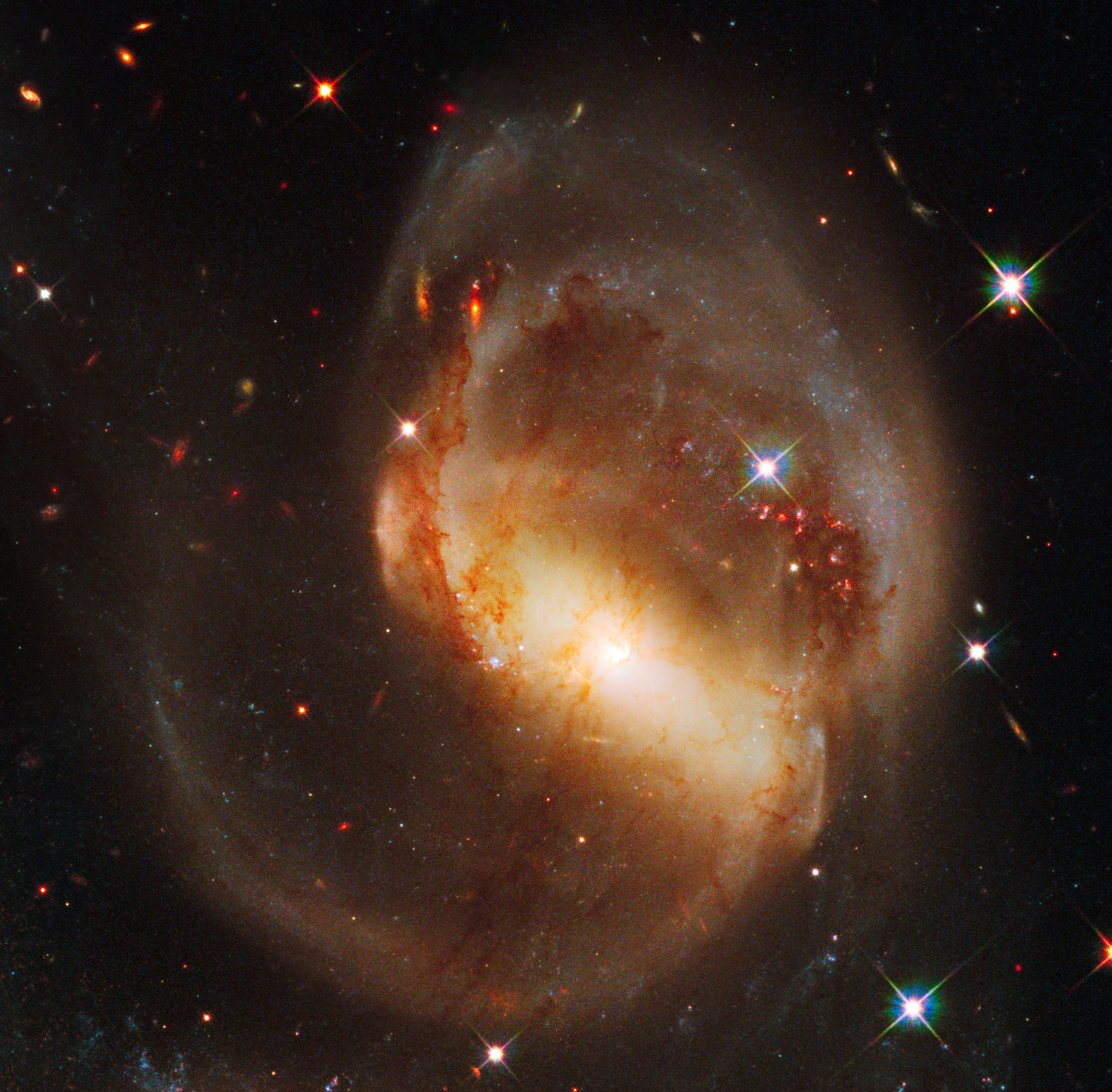
- NGC 7319 imaged by the Hubble Space Telescope

Observation data (J2000 epoch)
- Constellation: Pegasus
- Right ascension: 22^{h} 36^{m} 03.56^{s}
- Declination: +33° 58′ 32.7″
- Redshift: 0.022
- Heliocentric radial velocity: 6,740 km/s
- Distance: 311 Mly (95.3 Mpc)
- Apparent magnitude (V): 14.1
- Apparent magnitude (B): 14.1
- Absolute magnitude (V): −21.1
- Absolute magnitude (B): −20.8
- Magnitude (J): 12.1
- Magnitude (H): 10.4
- Magnitude (K): 10.1

Characteristics
- Type: SB(s)bc pec
- Mass: ~1.1×10^{11} M_{☉} M_{☉}
- Size: 25.09 kiloparsecs (81,800 light-years) (diameter; 25.0 mag/arcsec^{2} B-band isophote)
- Apparent size (V): 1′.7 × 1′.3

Other designations
- NGC 7319, UGC 12102, LEDA 69269, PGC 69269

NGC 7319 is a highly distorted barred spiral galaxy that is a member of the compact Stephan's Quintet group located in the constellation Pegasus, some 311 megalight-years distant from the Milky Way. It was discovered on 27 September 1873 by French astronomer Édouard Stephan.

The galaxy's arms, dust and gas have been highly disturbed as a result of the interaction with the other members of the Quintet. Nearly all of the neutral hydrogen has been stripped from this galaxy, most likely as a result of a collision with NGC 7320c some 100 million years ago. A pair of long, parallel tidal tails extend southward from NGC 7319 in the direction of NGC 7320c, and is undergoing star formation.

This is a type 2 Seyfert galaxy with one of the largest circumnuclear outflows known in galaxies of this type. This outflow reaches velocities of up to 500 km/s and spans 13 kly. The star formation rate appears normal for a spiral galaxy at 1.98±0.58 M_{☉} yr^{−1}, and the majority (68%) is occurring in the spiral arms. The core appears faint in the ultraviolet band, indicating heavy extinction within the active galactic nucleus. There is a three component radio source with an overall size of 5.5 kly that is straddling the nucleus. A strong X-ray source with a high redshift has been detected at a separation of 8″ from the galactic nucleus, a quasi-stellar object.

== Supernova ==
One supernova has been observed in NGC 7319: SN 1971P (type unknown, mag. 16.8) was discovered by Leonida Rosino on 19 August 1971.

== See also ==
- List of NGC objects (7001–7840)
