= NGC 7318 =

Pair of interacting galaxies in the constellation Pegasus

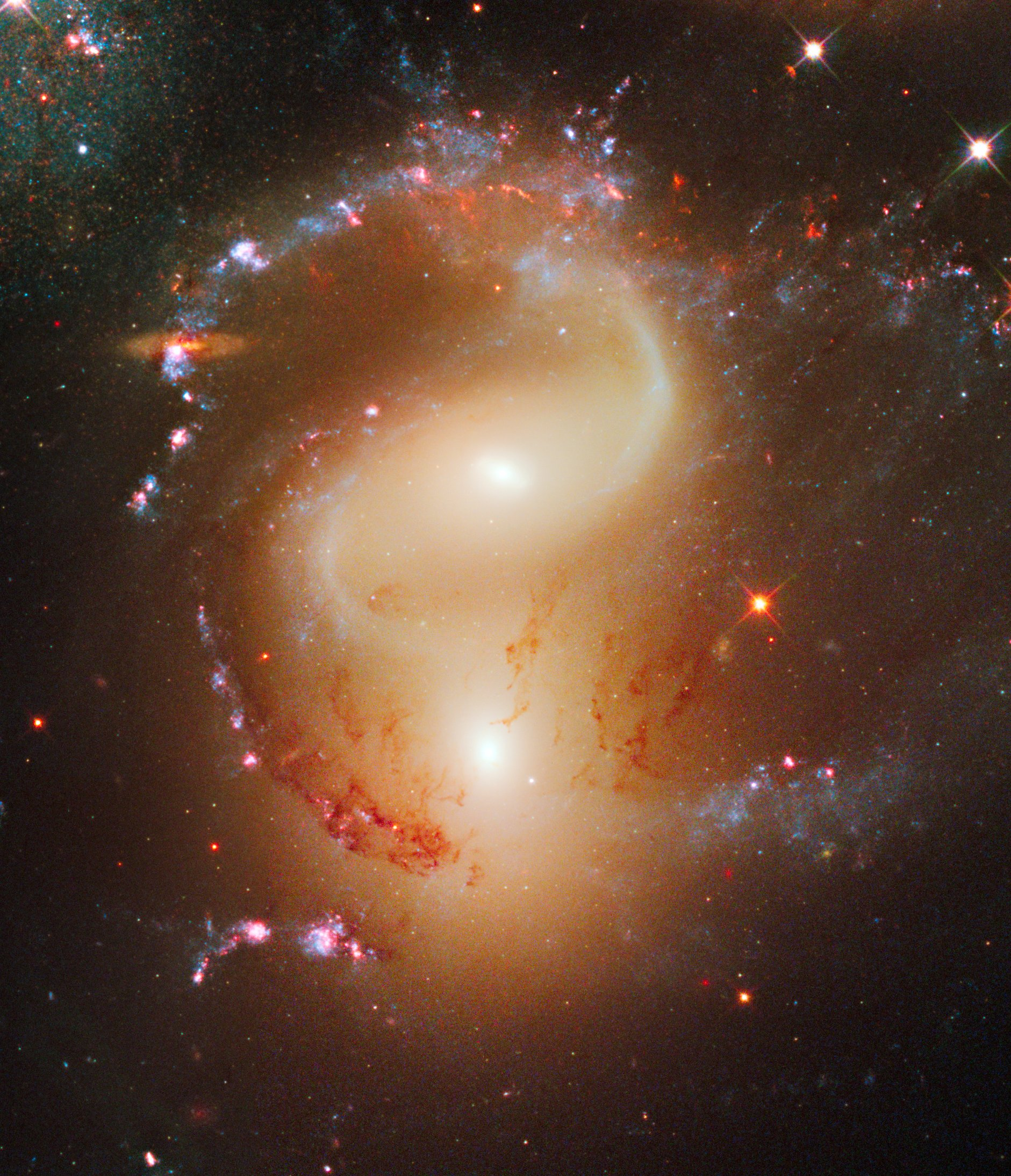
- NGC 7318 imaged by the Hubble Space Telescope. 8-micrometre infrared light = red, H-alpha = green, visible red light = blue. NGC 7318b is the upper galaxy, NGC 7318a is the lower galaxy.

Observation data (J2000 epoch)
- Constellation: Pegasus
- Right ascension: 22^{h} 35^{m} 56.7^{s} / 22^{h} 35^{m} 58.4^{s}
- Declination: +33° 57′ 56″ / +33° 57′ 57″
- Redshift: 6630 ± 23 / 5774 ± 24 km/s
- Distance: 85 Mpc
- Apparent magnitude (V): 14.4 / 13.9

Characteristics
- Type: E2 pec / SB(s)bc pec
- Apparent size (V): 0.9′ × 0.9′ / 1.9′ × 1.2′
- Notable features: Colliding galaxies

Other designations
- NGC 7318A / 7318B; UGC 12099 / 12100; Arp 319; PGC 69260 / 69263; HCG 92D / 92B

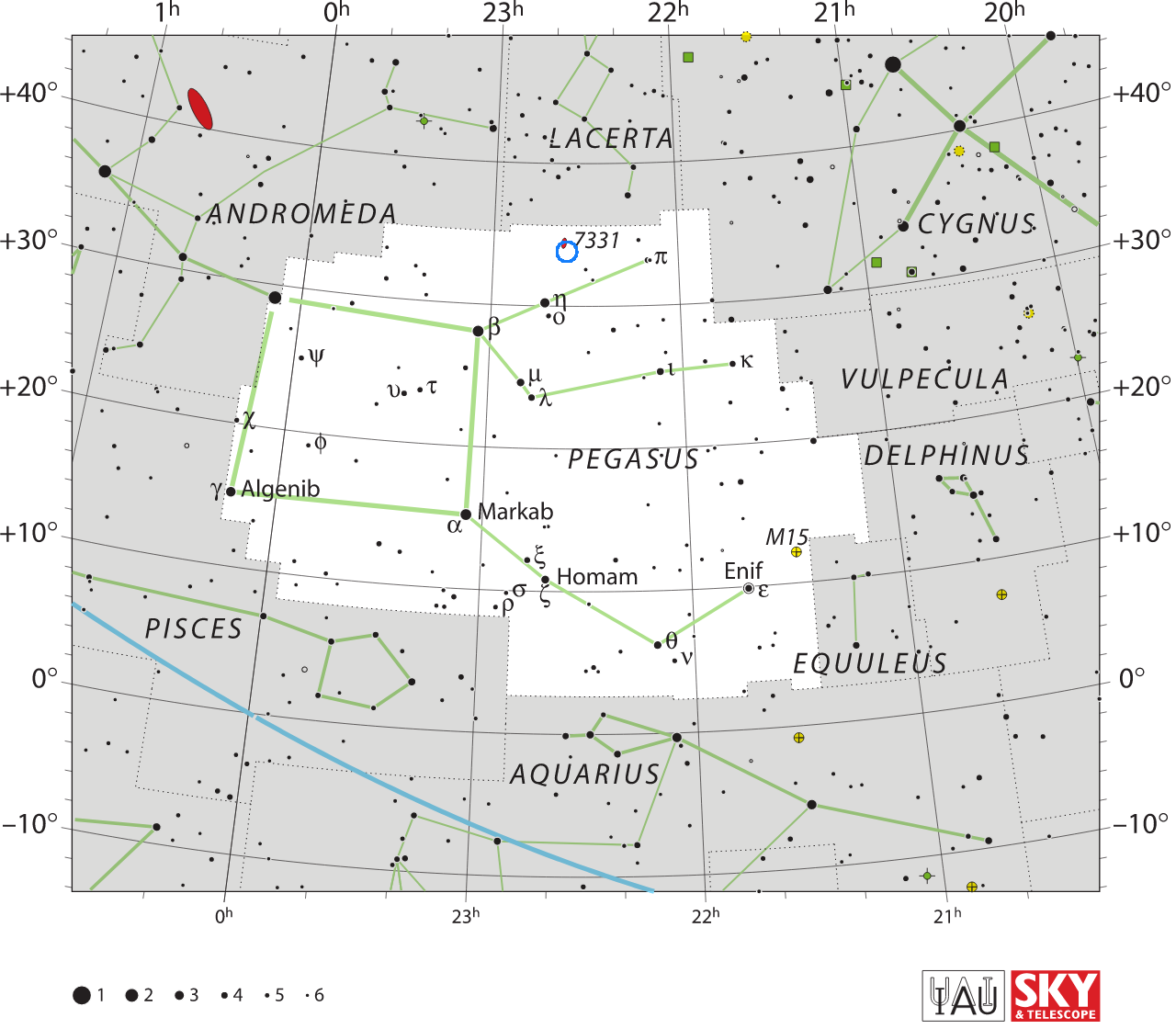
The location of NGC 7318 (circled in blue)

NGC 7318 (also known as UGC 12099/UGC 12100 or HCG 92d/b) is a pair of colliding galaxies about 280 million light-years from Earth. They appear in the constellation Pegasus and are members of Stephan's Quintet. They were discovered on 27 September 1873 by French astronomer Édouard Stephan.

The Spitzer Space Telescope revealed the presence of a large intergalactic shock wave, shown by an arc produced by NGC 7318b colliding with the group at ≥ 900 km/sec.

As NGC 7318b collides with NGC 7318a, atoms of hydrogen in the cluster's gas are heated by the shock wave, producing the green glow. The molecular hydrogen visible in the collision is one of the most turbulent forms known. This phenomenon was discovered by an international team of scientists of the Max Planck Institute for Nuclear Physics (MPIK) in Heidelberg. This collision can help provide a view into what happened in the early universe, around ten billion years ago.

== See also ==
- List of NGC objects (7001–7840)
