= Galaxy group =

Aggregation of galaxies with 50 or fewer members

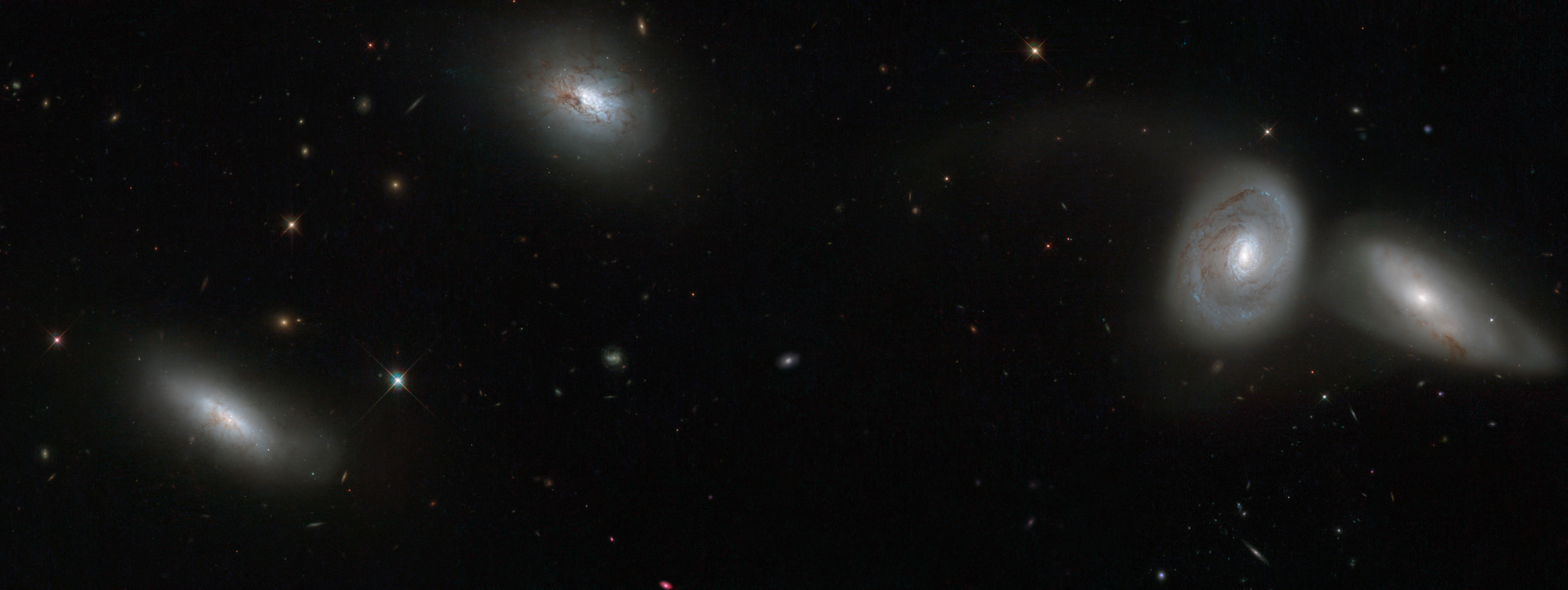
Four of the seven members of galaxy group HCG 16

A galaxy group or group of galaxies (GrG) is an aggregation of galaxies comprising about 50 or fewer gravitationally bound members, each at least as luminous as the Milky Way (about 10^{10} times the luminosity of the Sun); collections of galaxies larger than groups that are first-order clustering are called galaxy clusters. The groups and clusters of galaxies can themselves be clustered, into superclusters of galaxies.

The Milky Way galaxy is part of a group of galaxies called the Local Group.

== Characteristics ==
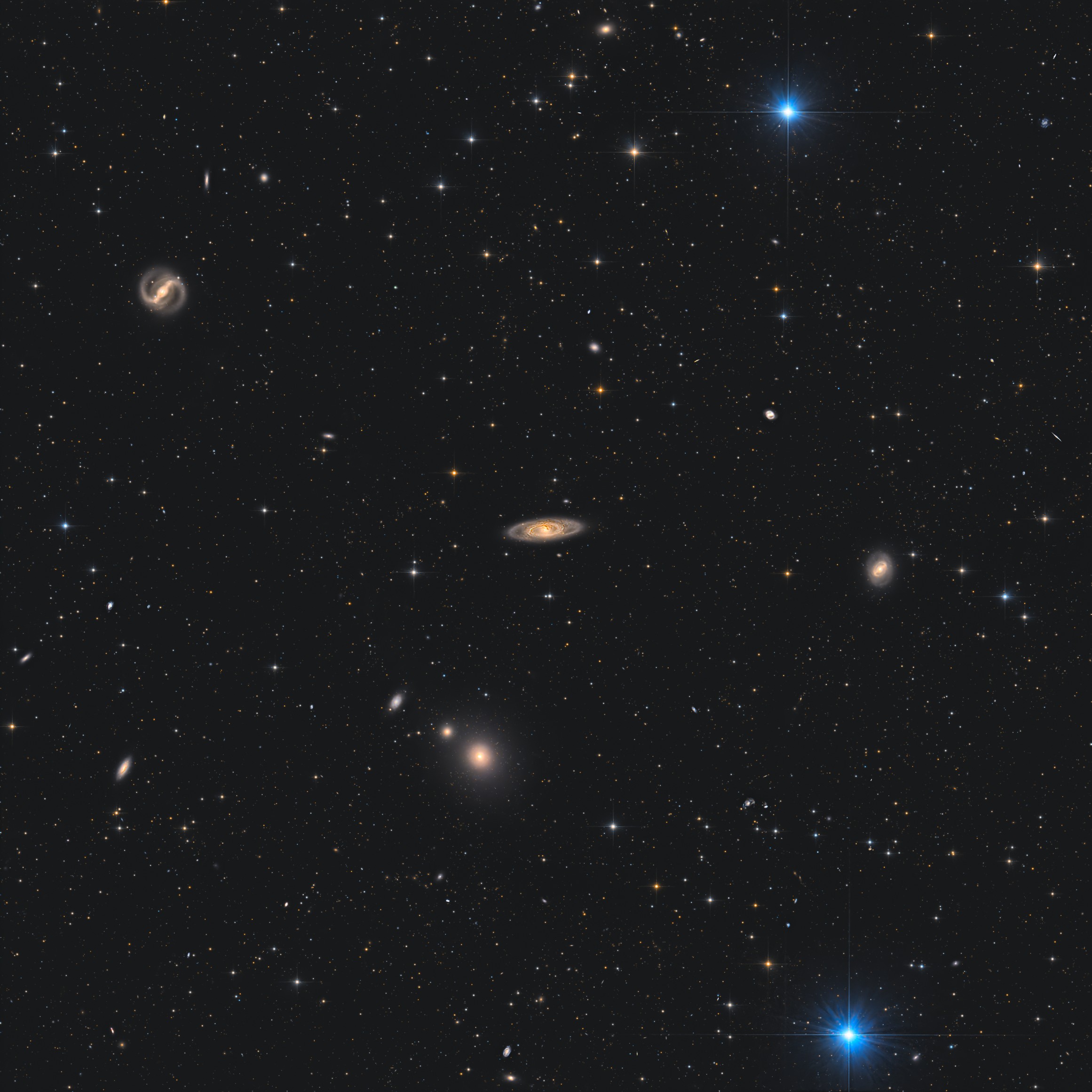
The NGC 4274 group with NGC 4274 as the foremost member at the center

Groups of galaxies are the smallest aggregates of galaxies. They typically contain no more than 50 galaxies in a diameter of 1 to 2 megaparsecs (Mpc). (Note: see 10^{22} m for distance comparisons) Their mass is approximately 10^{13} solar masses. The spread of velocities for the individual galaxies is about 150 km/s. However, this definition should be used as a guide only, as larger and more massive galaxy systems are sometimes classified as galaxy groups.

Groups are the most common structures of galaxies in the universe, accounting for at least 50% of the galaxies in the local universe. Groups have a mass range between those of the very large elliptical galaxies and clusters of galaxies. In the local universe, about half of the groups exhibit diffuse X-ray emissions from their intracluster media. Those that emit X-rays appear to have early-type galaxies as members. The diffuse X-ray emissions come from zones within the inner 10–50% of the groups' virial radius, generally 50–500 kpc.

== Types ==
There are several subtypes of groups.

=== Compact groups ===
A compact group consists of a small number of galaxies, typically around five, in close proximity and relatively isolated from other galaxies and formations. The first compact group to be discovered was Stephan's Quintet, found in 1877. Stephan's Quintet is named for a compact group of four galaxies plus an unassociated foreground galaxy. Astronomer Paul Hickson created a catalogue of such groups in 1982, the Hickson Compact Groups.

Compact groups of galaxies readily show the effect of dark matter, as the visible mass is greatly less than that needed to gravitationally hold the galaxies together in a bound group. Compact galaxy groups are also not dynamically stable over Hubble time, thus showing that galaxies evolve by merger, over the timescale of the age of the universe.

=== Fossil groups ===
Fossil galaxy groups, fossil groups, or fossil clusters are believed to be the end-result of galaxy merging within a normal galaxy group, leaving behind the X-ray halo of the progenitor group. Galaxies within a group interact and merge. The physical process behind this galaxy-galaxy merger is dynamical friction. The time-scales for dynamical friction on luminous (or L*) galaxies suggest that fossil groups are old, undisturbed systems that have seen little infall of L* galaxies since their initial collapse. Fossil groups are thus an important laboratory for studying the formation and evolution of galaxies and the intragroup medium in an isolated system. Fossil groups may still contain unmerged dwarf galaxies, but the more massive members of the group have condensed into the central galaxy. This hypothesis is supported by studies of computer simulations of cosmological volumes.

The closest fossil group to the Milky Way is NGC 6482, an elliptical galaxy at a distance of approximately 180 million light-years located in the constellation of Hercules.

=== Proto-groups ===
Proto-groups are groups that are in the process of formation. They are the smaller form of protoclusters. These contain galaxies and protogalaxies embedded in dark matter haloes that are in the process of fusing into group-formations of singular dark matter halos.

== List ==
Notable groups
Group	Notes
Local Group	The group where the Milky Way, including the Earth, is located
Stephan's Quintet	One of the most photogenic groups
Robert's Quartet	Another very notable group
Bullet Group	The merging group exhibits separation of dark matter from normal matter
This lists some of the most notable groups; for more groups, see the list article.

== See also ==
- Illustris project
