= Stephan's Quintet =

Visual grouping of five galaxies

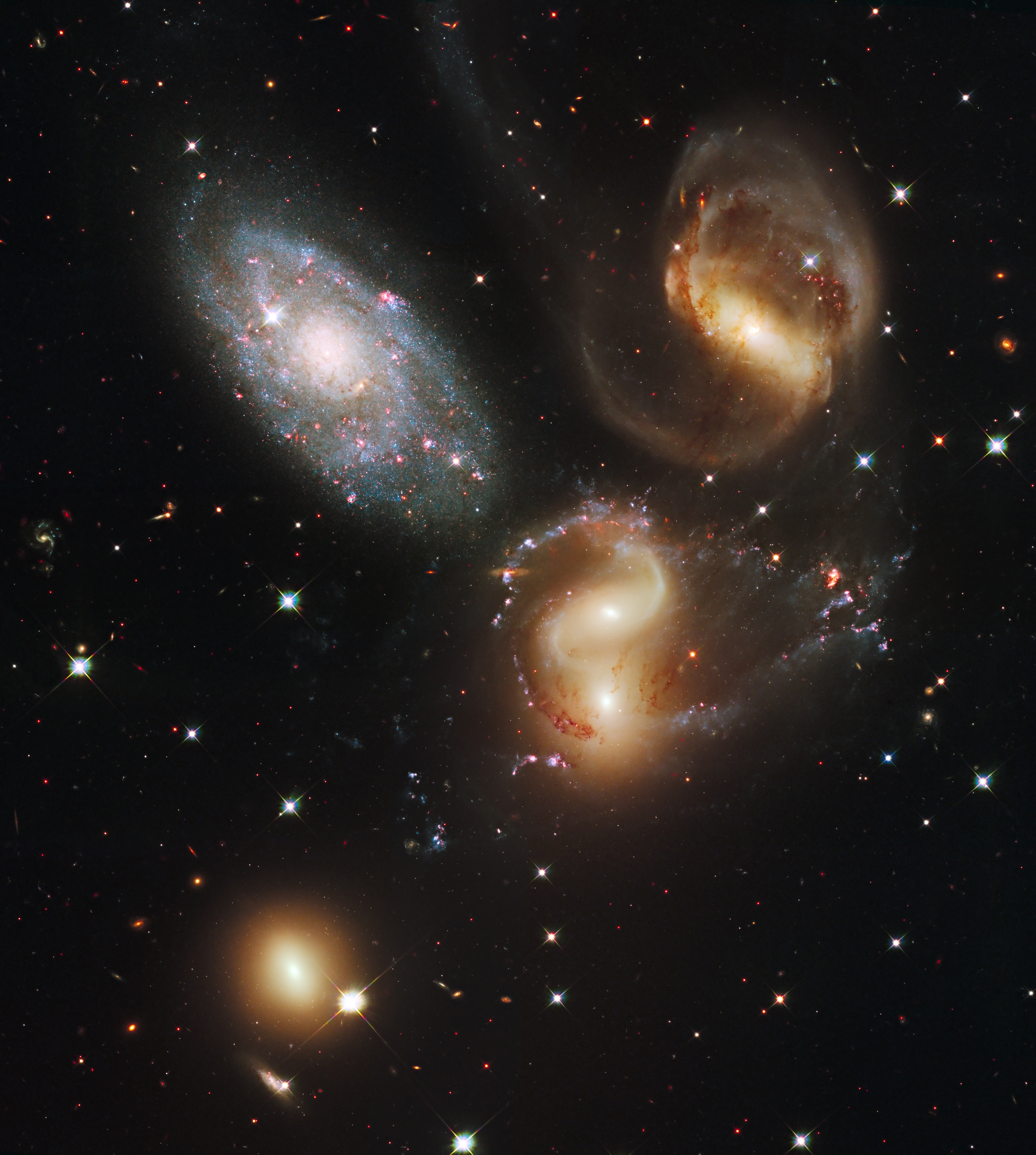
- Clockwise from upper left: NGC 7320, NGC 7319, NGC 7318 (a and b), NGC 7317

Observation data (Epoch J2000)
- Constellation: Pegasus
- Right ascension: 22^{h} 35^{m} 57.5^{s}
- Declination: +33° 57′ 36″
- Brightest member: NGC 7318B
- Number of galaxies: 5
- Velocity dispersion: 337 km/s
- Redshift: 0.021500
- Distance: 90.25 ± 6.33 Mpc

Other designations
- HCG 92, Arp 319, VV 288, SQ, UGC 12101

Stephan's Quintet is a visual grouping of five galaxies in the constellation Pegasus, four of which form a physical associated compact group designated Hickson Compact Group 92. It was the first compact galaxy group to be discovered and one of the most well studied systems of its kind. The group was discovered by Édouard Stephan in 1877 using the 80 cm reflector telescope at the Marseille Observatory. The brightest member of the apparent grouping is NGC 7320, while the brightest member of the physical association is NGC 7318B.

Radio observations in the late 1970s revealed a filament of emission between the galaxies in the group. Observations with modern space telescopes identified the filament as a shock wave, caused by the high-speed intruder (NGC 7318B) colliding with the intragroup medium (IGrM) at approximately 850–1,000 kilometers per second. Stephan's Quintet contains at least 13 candidate tidal dwarf galaxies, with several located in the tidal tail connecting to NGC 7319. A nearby galaxy, NGC 7320C, has been proposed as an earlier intruder responsible for the formation of the inner and outer tidal tails of NGC 7319.

High-sensitivity observations by the FAST and MeerKAT revealed a massive diffuse reservoir of neutral hydrogen (H I) surrounding the group, indicating that its galaxies have undergone substantial gas stripping. NGC 7319 hosts the only confirmed active galactic nucleus in Stephan's Quintet, while NGC 7317 and NGC 7320 may also host AGNs, but their presence remains unconfirmed.

Stephan's Quintet was selected as one of the five cosmic objects observed by the James Webb Space Telescope as part of the release of its first official science images. Observations of the field have enabled studies of distant background galaxies, allowing astronomers to investigate galaxy evolution in the early universe. It has been featured several times on Astronomy Picture of the Day.

== Members ==
The spiral fraction of the physical association has been estimated to range from 0.25 to 0.75, depending on whether NGC 7319 and NGC 7318A are classified as spiral or elliptical galaxies. NGC 7318A has an optical appearance of an ordinary elliptical galaxy.

HCG	Name	Type	R.A.	Dec	Radial velocity (km/s)	Apparent Magnitude	Classification
92A	NGC 7320	SA(s)d	22^{h} 36^{m} 03.38^{s}	+33° 56′ 53.2″	786 ± 20	+13.2	Foreground
92B	NGC 7318B	SB(s)bc pec	22^{h} 35^{m} 58.4^{s}	+33° 57′ 57″	5,774 ± 24	+13.9	Group member
92C	NGC 7319	SB(s)bc pec	22^{h} 36^{m} 03.5^{s}	+33° 58′ 33″	6,747 ± 7	+14.1	Group member
92D	NGC 7318A	E2 pec	22^{h} 35^{m} 56.7^{s}	+33° 57′ 56″	6,630 ± 23	+14.3	Group member
92E	NGC 7317	E4	22^{h} 35^{m} 51.9^{s}	+33° 56′ 42″	6,599 ± 26	+14.6	Group member
	NGC 7320C	(R)SAB(s)0/a	22^{h} 36^{m} 20.4^{s}	+33° 59′ 6″	5985 ± 9	+16.7	Associated

== Environment ==
=== Foreground ===
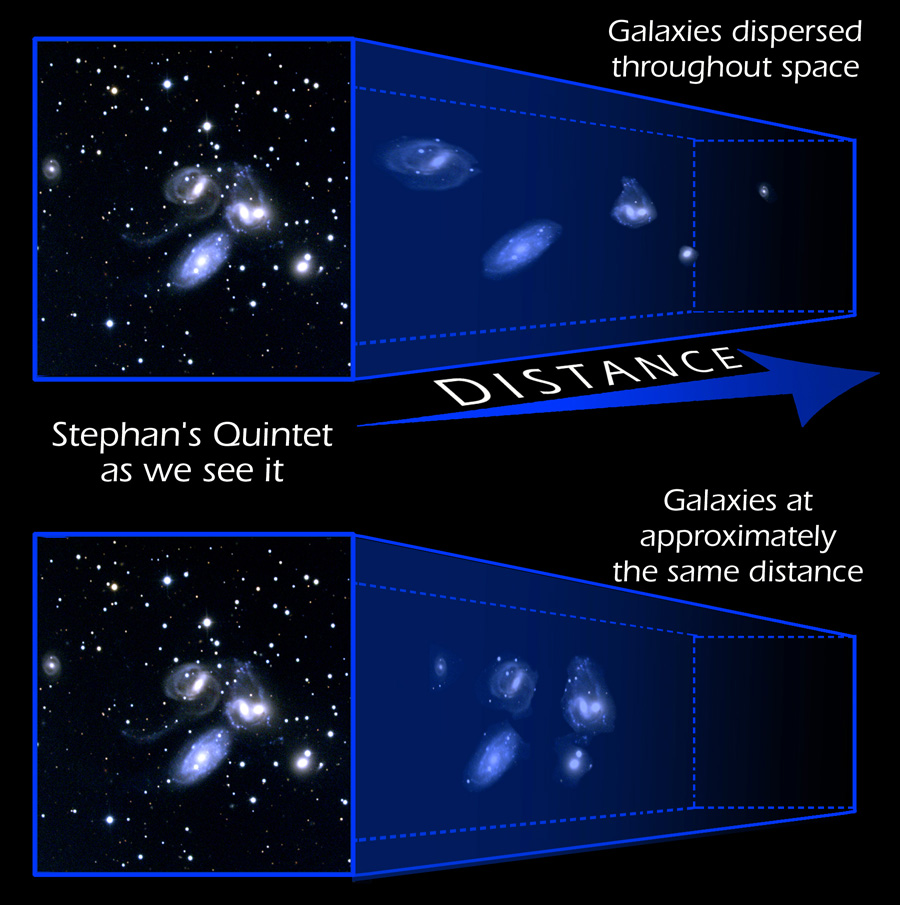
Stephan's Quintet: Optical Alignment or Physical Association?

In 1973, astronomer Halton Arp conducted a radio survey of the surrounding field of Stephan's Quintet using the Jet Propulsion Laboratory's 210-foot telescope. The survey identified NGC 7331, Anon and NGC 7363. NGC 7320 is a foreground galaxy at a distance of approximately ~44 million light-years (13.49 megaparsecs) and has a recessional velocity of approximately 790 kilometers per second (km/s), making it closer to Earth than the other four galaxies. NGC 7320 is considered to be one of four companion galaxies of NGC 7331, a member of the NGC 7331 Group also designated LGG 459 Group. Earlier observations suggested NGC 7331 and NGC 7320 were connected by a faint radio bridge but subsequent 100–m radio surveys found no evidence of such a structure.

Observations using the Canada-France-Hawaii Telescope (CFHT) suggested that the faint filaments in the field of Stephan's Quintet might be Galactic cirrus, diffuse dust structures in the Milky Way. Radio detections detected a detached magnetized cloud located in the foreground void space between the Milky Way and Stephan's Quintet, with a rotation measure of approximately +240 rad m^{−2}.

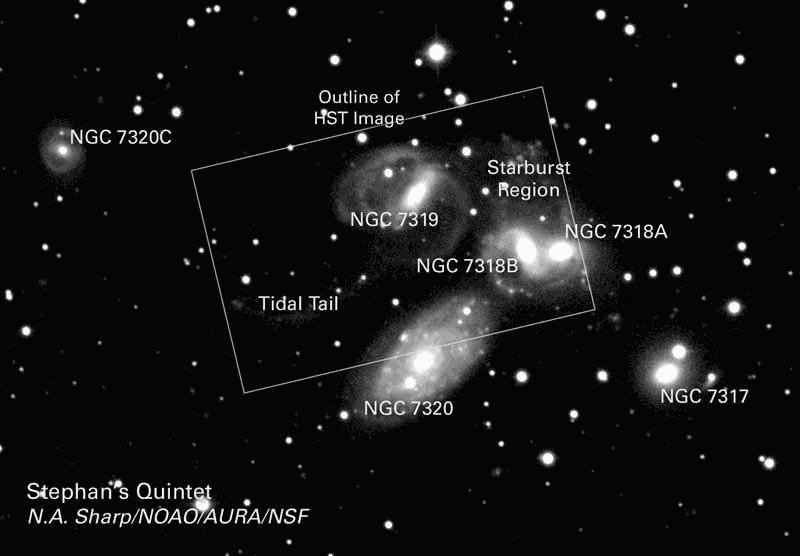
The galaxies in the vicinity of Stephan's Quintet. The rectangle indicates the area covered by the 1998–99 Hubble Space Telescope image

=== Local environment ===
Stephan's Quintet and its neighboring galaxies labeled taken by Newton telescope.

The field surrounding Stephan's Quintet contains 21 galaxies, comprising four ellipticals, one lenticular and 16 spirals. Stephan's Quintet is located in a relatively low galaxy surface density environment, but it contains an unusually high number of elliptical early-type galaxies. Stephan's Quintet has a field density of 0.28±0.05 object arcmin^{-2}. Several HI-emitting galaxies were detected in the surrounding field of Stephan's Quintet, known as Anon 1 through 9.

On a larger scale, Stephan's Quintet is considered to be in an extended region called Zwicky 8719 or Zwicky 2231.2+3732, which is estimated to have 782 members. Zwicky & Kowal described it as "open" and "near". In the catalog's terminology, an "open" galaxy cluster lacks a pronounced concentration of galaxies, while a "near" cluster belongs to a distance class defined by a recession velocity below 15,000 km/s. NGC 7335, NGC 7337 and NGC 7340, form a loose group or "poor cluster" with Stephan's Quintet.

The redshift of the brightest member of Stephan's Quintet, NGC 7318, places Stephan's Quintet within the Perseus–Pisces Supercluster.

=== Background ===
A survey found a quasar only 8′′ away from the Seyfert 2 nucleus of NGC 7319. Its optical counterpart was identified with a redshift of 2.114. It is classified as an ultraluminous X-ray source with an X-ray luminosity (L_{X}) of 1.5 ×10^{40} erg sec^{-1}. The quasar's spectrum contains absorption features at a redshift of 0.022, attributed to the intervening gas in NGC 7319. The intervening lines are caused by the quasar's light crossing the interstellar medium (ISM) of NGC 7319.

Although the background quasar is located approximately 8′′ from the nucleus of NGC 7319, XMM observations reveal that it contributes only 5% of the total X-ray photons in the region. The remaining 95% originates from the Seyfert nucleus NGC 7319 itself and is modeled as a complex system with a double power law, a redshifted Fe Kα line from the accretion disk and a thermal plasma component (approximately 0.6 kiloelectronvolt (keV)) from the surrounding hot gas.

Another double radio source (SQ–R) was identified without any optical counterpart in the surrounding field of Stephan's Quintet. A more distant galaxy cluster, designated as 2XMMi J223546.4+335304, is located in the same field as Stephan's Quintet. It contains a type-cD galaxy, SDSS J223546.31+335303.8, located at a redshift of 0.3854. This galaxy cluster has an intracluster gas temperature of 1.34 keV, an X-ray luminosity of 2.28 ×10^{35} Watts.

=== Deep field observations ===
The field surrounding Stephan's Quintet was chosen as a "public field" for JWST's Early Release Observations (ERO), making its JWST observations immediately available to the community. JWST observations have been used to search for quiescent galaxies in the early universe (z = 2–5). In 2024, astronomers identified Quintet-z12-9091, a galaxy that has a redshift of z = 12.2 with an absolute magnitude of −21.44.

Astronomers also identified other candidate deep-field galaxies, such as S5-z12-1 and S5-z16-1 at photometric redshift of 16.41 and 12.58, respectively. S5-z16-1 has an absolute ultraviolet magnitude of (M_{UV}) of −21.62 and an effective radius (r_{e}) of 0.15 kpc. ALMA Band 7 observations detected a spectral-line feature of S5-z16-1 at 338.726 GHz, which may correspond to either [O III] 52 μm emission at z = 16.01 or [C II] 158 μm emission at z ~4.61, but neither has been confirmed.

== Interactions and dynamical history ==
=== Earlier Interactions ===
NGC 7320C, known as the "first collider" or "old intruder", is proposed to have undergone several encounters with NGC 7319 approximately 500 million years ago and produced parallel tidal tails known as the "young" tail and "old" tail. The "young" tail extends for more than 100 kiloparsecs (kpc), while the "old" tail is the oldest identified tidal structure in Stephan's Quintet, is approximately 100 kpc long and is connected to the shock zones by a compact H I cloud. The interaction of NGC 7320C and NGC 7319 contributed a significant mass of stripped stars to the common halo of the group.

H I observations with MeerKAT associated with NGC 7320C provide further information about its proposed interaction with NGC 7319. H I observations revealed approximately 2×10^{8} M_{⊙} of atomic gas, distributed across approximately 20 kpc. Studies found no detectable H I connection between NGC 7320C and tidal tails of Stephan's Quintet. Because NGC 7320C has a redshift and low relative velocity similar to NGC 7319, astronomers suggest that NGC 7320C made a relatively slow passage.

=== Collision involving NGC 7318B ===
Stephan's Quintet's shock wave caused by NGC 7318A colliding with the intragroup medium.

ROSAT's High Resolution Imager (HRI) revealed an elongated structure in the intragroup medium (IGrM) between NGC 7319 and NGC 7318B. This structure appears sharply bounded, extends approximately 40 kpc and was identified as a shock front. This structure is thought to have formed when NGC 7318B collided with the stripped gas of Stephan's Quintet at approximately 850–1000 km/s. Astronomers consider the collision to be at an early stage because NGC 7318B still retains most of its neutral hydrogen (H I) gas and several H II regions. IGrM is filled with hot, low-density gas, which exist between the spaces of galaxies in a galaxy group. Shock front is a boundary where the physical conditions undergo an abrupt change because of a shock wave. Shock fronts heat the gas and produce discontinuities in temperature and density, which are mainly observed in the X-ray wavelength.

By analyzing the spectral aging of relativistic electrons, astronomers determined that the high-speed collision began at the northern end of the shock ridge approximately 20 million years ago and propagated southward, finishing its impact ~5-6 million years ago.

The geometry of the collision suggests that the intruder galaxy NGC 7318B struck the tidal filaments at a shallow angle of approximately 15°. The collision is inferred to occur at an angle of approximately 58° relative to the line of sight. This geometry lowers the shock velocity and explains the observed gas temperature that is approximately 0.6 keV rather than the approximately 2 keV predicted from a head-on collision. The radio data also exclude the possibility of weak shocks (M ≈ 2–4) propagating through the hot X-ray gas, as the weak shocks are unable to produce the flat spectral indices and their expected radio luminosity is low. Astronomers suggest that the shock must be driven directly into the cold, dense H I gas, producing a shock with a high-Mach-number (Mach 40–100). Astronomers also suggest that adiabatic compression of a preexisting electron population is implausible, as no seeds (fossil electrons) have been observed and the Mach numbers conflict with the X-ray observations.

=== Numerical Simulations ===
Collisionless N-body simulations suggested that a single encounter by a companion galaxy was less likely to account for the formation of both "inner" and "outer" tidal tails of NGC 7319. Researchers proposed three scenarios, one in which NGC 7320C made successive passes by NGC 7319; another in which NGC 7320C formed both tails during a single encounter; and a third in which NGC 7320C produced the "old" tail, while a subsequent encounter by NGC 7318A formed the "young" tail. The authors noted that reproducing the third scenario was particularly challenging because the later passage would occur in a system that is already disturbed.

By contrast, hydrodynamic simulations support the view that two tidal tails extending from NGC 7319 formed simultaneously during a high-speed encounter with the companion galaxy NGC 7320C, rather than during separate passes. The different star formation histories do not result from their formation at different times, but rather due to the environment in which the tails evolved.

Simulations of the collision of NGC 7318B with the IGrM reveal that the collision created a "gas bridge" within which clouds are predicted to continue colliding for millions of years. Although NGC 7318B is known as the "new intruder" entering the group for the first time, the heavily stripped state of its gas disk and the presence of tidal tail-like features around the NGC 7318 pair suggest that it may have undergone earlier interactions.

Further hydrodynamic modeling using Smoothed-particle hydrodynamic (SPH) simulations of Stephan's Quintet reveal the complex dynamics of the group. Two primary simulation models have been developed: Model A assumes more massive progenitor galaxies and models NGC 7318A as an elliptical, resulting in a violent collision that reproduces the observed strength of the radio synchrotron emission. Model B uses less massive galaxies and models NGC 7318A as a gas-rich spiral. This model reproduces the spatial distribution and structure of the observed radio emission more accurately. A comparison of the two models showed that Model B provides a better fit, particularly in reproducing the current positions of the NGC 7318 pair and the formation of the parallel tidal tails. However, Model B fails to correctly reproduce the small-scale features and the position of NGC 7318A. The simulations support the interpretation that the large-scale shock wave amplifies the magnetic fields and powering the synchrotron radio ridge.

== Physical properties and dynamics ==
=== Morphology and general properties ===
James Webb Space Telescope, Hubble Space Telescope and Subaru Telescope composite image of Stephan's Quintet.

Using the moment-of-inertia method and Monte-Carlo simulations, the projected axial ratio of the fitted spheroid of Stephan's Quintet and nearby galaxies, excluding the foreground galaxy NGC 7320, is q = 0.53. Deep multi-band imaging revealed a massive, diffuse, reddish halo of old stars surrounding the early-type galaxy NGC 7317. This halo extends up to 60 kpc from the galaxy and is offset from the galaxy's core.

Stephan's Quintet has a median projected galaxy-galaxy separation of 28.2 kpc. It also has a dimensionless crossing time (H_{0}t_{c}) of 0.0054. It provides insight into the group's dynamical state, while its reciprocal approximates the maximum number of times a galaxy could have crossed the group's center over the age of the universe. Stephan's Quintet's mass-to-light ratio (M_{⊙}/L_{⊙}) is estimated at 43.7 solar units, based on its adopted mass and total blue luminosity.

NGC 7319 is proposed to be undergoing morphological transformation from a spiral to an elliptical galaxy. The lack of H I gas in NGC 7319, which is primarily used for forming stars, is consistent with the gas-poor characteristics of an elliptical galaxy. The H I is proposed to have been stripped or removed from the disk of NGC 7319 during earlier interactions. This interpretation is supported by the H I filaments seen around the main body of NGC 7319.

=== Neutral hydrogen ===
==== Early observations ====
Neutral atomic hydrogen (H I) is the least gravitationally bound component of galaxies and is the component most easily stripped off and spread around during interactions between galaxies. Early 21–cm radio observations reported no detection of H I for NGC 7318B. Astronomers presumed that NGC 7318B is not part of Stephan's Quintet as H I is crucial for determining a galaxy's distance and redshift. Follow-up research using the Arecibo Telescope in the 1980s found that Stephan's Quintet has a very complex velocity structure, with the gas split into three distinct velocity components, 5,700, 6,000, and 6,600 km/s.

Additional studies in 1983 found low-velocity H I gas that appeared displaced from NGC 7320's center. Because NGC 7320 appears H I-deficient for its morphological type, astronomers thought NGC 7320 was physically interacting with the high-redshift members. An H I survey using the VLA found that the H I is not detected in any core galaxies of Stephan's Quintet, but is found in the tidal debris, outside of the galaxies. Follow-up studies detected four H I clouds located on the tidal tails that extend eastward. Two H I clumps were found to be luminous infrared and bright Hα sources. A study using the Green Bank Telescope revealed that Stephan's Quintet is a tidal-debris-dominated system. Stephan's Quintet has a total H I mass significantly higher than ISM-dominated systems.

==== Recent observations ====
Recent observations with FAST identified a compact cloud northwest of NGC 7319, which is coincident with the IGrM starburst of NGC 7318A, an inner and an outer tail of NGC 7319. Two additional H I sources, NGC 7320A and Anon 7, near Stephan's Quintet were identified without any stellar counterparts. Researchers discovered a diffuse H I structure of approximately 0.6 Mpc (1.957 million light years) in size. Two hypotheses were proposed. The first suggests that NGC 7320A passed through the center of Stephan's Quintet, causing the formation of a tidal tail. Over approximately 1.5 billion years, the tidal tail has become the diffuse cloud we see today. The second hypothesis is that a nearby galaxy had a high-speed head-on collision with one of the core members of Stephan's Quintet. Follow-up studies revealed a total H I mass of (3.48 ± 0.35) × 10^{10} M_{⊙} and suggested the diffuse 0.6 Mpc feature was likely caused by gas ejected from a core galaxy during an interaction with an early intruder more than 1 billion years ago. Follow-up studies also resolved the H I emission in Stephan's Quintet into five distinct velocity components (5,700, 6,000, 6,300, 6,600, 6,900 km/s).

A composite image by MeerKAT, JWST's Mid Infrared and Near Infrared and optical imaging by Pan-STARRS

Complementary 21–cm mapping with MeerKAT estimated an H I mass of (3.5 ± 0.4) × 10^{10} M_{⊙}. The MeerKAT observations uncovered new H I structures, including the first detections of residual gas within NGC 7319 and NGC 7320C, a high-velocity H I component associated with the SQ–A starburst and a new northern gas bridge connecting NGC 7319 to SQ–A. Two distinct gas bridges connecting NGC 7319 to SQ–A have been found, and the southern bridge exhibits a coherent multi-wavelength structure, a strong velocity gradient and a tidal feature. The northern bridge has no velocity gradient and its gas components follow divergent paths. The total H I integrated flux density of Stephan's Quintet is 17.2 ± 2.0 Jy km/s corresponding to an atomic gas mass of M_{HI} = 3.5 ± 0.4 × 10^{10} M_{⊙}.

The H I observations also provide constraints on the gas distribution and dynamics of NGC 7318B. The H I distribution associated with NGC 7318B is ellipsoidal and broadly consistent with its optical morphology, suggesting a disk inclined significantly to the line of sight. Adopting an optical inclination of 58.4°, the disk's rotational velocity was estimated at approximately 175 km/s. The low-velocity (5,800-6,300 km/s) component exhibits shocked gas with approximately solar metallicity and H II regions that survived the shock. The H I in the low-velocity components 5,700 and 6,000 km/s is 6.9 × 10^{9} M_{⊙}, about 53% of the amount expected for a galaxy of its luminosity.

=== Molecular gas ===
Early observations using the Owens Valley Millimeter Array (OVMA) revealed that only NGC 7319 is detected and the molecular gas is concentrated in a single region approximately eight kpc from its nucleus. With a molecular gas mass of 8.6 × 10^{8} M_{⊙}, NGC 7319 is considered to have one-third of the molecular gas detected in the Milky Way.

Observations using IRAM 30m Telescope and Spitzer reveal that the velocity dispersion of the giant molecular cloud (GMC) in the shock region is an order of magnitude larger than that observed in the Milky Way. The PAH-to-Carbon Monoxide (CO) luminosity ratio is up to 75 times lower than that measured in star-forming galaxies. Observations reveal a tail of warm, diffuse molecular gas extending from NGC 7317 toward the NGC 7318 pair. Astronomers suggest that NGC 7317 could have passed through the center of Stephan's Quintet in the past, experiencing an episode of "galaxy harassment".

==== Carbon monoxide ====
Using the Atacama Large Millimeter Array (ALMA) and Combined Array for Research in Millimeter-wave Astronomy (CARMA), the highest gas excitation was found in the central region of NGC 7319 (r_{21} = 1.36 ± 0.64) that is comparable to values observed in barred spiral galaxies (r_{21} ≈ 0.7). Young super star clusters (SSCs) in the starburst region (SQ–A) and the Left Arc coincide spatially with peaks in CO emission, while the Right Arc contains many young clusters but no detectable CO emission.

Follow-up studies using ALMA and the Atacama Compact Array (ATA) identified four discrete CO clumps, with masses ranging from 2.7 ± 0.6 to 11.5 ± 1.8 × 10^{7} M_{⊙} and radial velocities of 6598–6628 km/s. Three of the CO clumps were found to have associated H I emission, whereas the fourth showed no evidence of associated H I emission or other counterparts. The highest star formation efficiency (SFE) was measured in Clump 1 (+0.59+0.01
−0.16 Gyr^{-1}). In contrast, the lowest SFE regions were measured in the ridge, bridge and NGC 7319-N (North of NGC 7319), which had SFEs as low as −1.61+0.04
−0.06 Gyr^{-1}, indicating turbulence suppresses formation of giant molecular clouds. The molecular gas kinematics comprised three distinct components, a low-velocity component associated with NGC 7318B, an intermediate-velocity component connecting NGC 7318B with NGC 7319 and a high-velocity component, distributed throughout NGC 7319, the tidal tail and SQ–A.

==== Molecular hydrogen ====
===== Early observations =====
The first detection of massive warm molecular hydrogen (H_{2}) in the IGrM of Stephan's Quintet was made by the Spitzer Space Telescope in 2006. The observations found the first nearly pure H_{2} line spectrum in an extragalactic object, with extended emission over 24 kpc along the X-ray-emitting shock front. This warm H_{2} gas was found to have a surface luminosity approximately ten times greater than the soft X-rays, resembling the emission from shocked gas seen in galactic supernova remnants, but on a galaxy-wide scale. Astronomers suggest a possible connection between galaxy-scale shock waves and broad H_{2} emission lines, as seen in the spectra of ultraluminous infrared galaxies (ULIRGs).

===== Turbulent cascade =====
Follow-up studies in 2010 found that the H_{2} in Stephan's Quintet emits strongly in pure rotational transitions, with a luminosity exceeding 9.7 × 10^{41} erg/s. The main shock region itself contains approximately 5 × 10^{8} M_{⊙} of warm H_{2} spread over an area of approximately 480 kpc². The shock region exhibits little star formation, indicating that the turbulent energy is radiated away by the H_{2} before gas can collapse gravitationally and form stars. Researchers suggest that this H_{2} cooling in fast galaxy-scale shocks could play a role in galaxy formation in the early universe. The H_{2} luminosity in Stephan's Quintet exceeds the X-ray luminosity of the hot gas by approximately a factor of three. This could not be explained by models of recombining gas, as the observed emission falls short by approximately a factor of 25.

A two-dimensional map of warm H_{2} covering 212 regions across Stephan's Quintet reveals over one billion solar masses of warm molecular hydrogen, with temperatures ranging from ~120 K in the star-forming SQ–A to over 1,000 K in the core of the shock ridge. When the high-speed shock front (1,000 km/s) propagates through a cloudy medium, it cascades into a network of low-velocity magnetohydrodynamic micro-shocks (4–25 km/s). These low-velocity shocks allow the molecular hydrogen to survive. These shocks are a mixture of slow continuous magnetohydrodynamic shocks (C-shocks) and faster jump shocks (J-shocks).

The massive shock wave in Stephan's Quintet has substantially reshaped the gas in the region. The energy was dominated by the bulk kinematic motion of the hot plasma and H_{2} gas. The collision dissipated this bulk energy, converting it into thermal energy in the hot plasma (4 × 10^{55} erg) and turbulent kinetic energy within the H_{2} gas (≥ 1.2 × 10^{56} erg). The total energy released by the collision (~ 10^{56} erg) is equivalent to the energy injected by every supernova in the Milky Way over the same timescale.

===== Shock cycle =====
Astronomers propose that the observed gas results from a cycle of magnetohydrodynamic shocks, turbulent mixing and continuous cyclic mass exchange driven by the shock wave. When a shock wave impacts the molecular clouds, the H_{2} gas is heated, excited and glows brightly in the infrared wavelengths. A more energetic shock may dissociate the H_{2} molecules into other less dense particles such as neutral hydrogen (H I) and ionized hydrogen (H^{+}). After the H_{2} molecules cool down and expand, the hydrogen atoms will recombine back into new H_{2} molecules.

Evidence for this comes from the high "ortho-to-para" ratio, which is a quantum signature that indicates the molecules were recently reformed shortly after the shock. The transfer of kinetic energy within the shock is driven by fluid instabilities, specifically Kelvin–Helmholtz and Rayleigh-Taylor instabilities. As the fast-moving hot plasma moves past the slower cold clouds, these instabilities shred the clouds into tiny fragments, mixing the hot, warm and cold gas on a small scale.

Recent sub-arcsecond observations using the James Webb Space Telescope (JWST) and ALMA have provided a detailed view of the shocked, turbulent H_{2} gas in Stephan's Quintet. Observations revealed "head-tail" structures in which dense, cold molecular clouds are being stripped and destroyed by the fast-moving shock. While the leading edge of the cloud is being stripped and disrupted, the stripped gas flows downstream, cools and collapses. At the outer edge of this shocked region, the recycled gas is observed forming a candidate dwarf galaxy. Further studies uncovered a region with a "triangular head" of warm H_{2} trailing behind a shell of cold H_{2} with a mass of approximately 4 × 10^{6} M_{⊙}. In another region, an "arrow-shaped" stream of warm H_{2} is found to connect two high-velocity cold clouds.

=== Cold dust ===
Analysis of data from the Herschel Space Observatory found that NGC 7318B and NGC 7319 show significant dust deficits of 70% and 56%, respectively, indicating that their dust has been stripped into the stellar debris. Observations show that 98% of NGC 7318B infrared flux originates from dust extending well beyond the galaxy's own stellar disk (dust radius 55″ versus stellar radius 22″), indicating that its dust has been stripped and redistributed into the surrounding debris field.

Far-infrared observations by the AKARI satellite revealed that the cold dust in the shock region has a color temperature of ~20 K. The single-peak emission in the 160 µm band was found to contain a significant contribution from [C II] 158μm emission, suggesting the ionized carbon originates from warm molecular gas. The gas-to-dust ratio in the shock region is consistent with the measured baseline of the Milky Way.

=== Magnetic field ===
Stephan's Quintet is one of the few compact groups in which polarized radio emission has been detected, allowing its magnetic field to be studied. The energy density of the magnetic field in the shock region is comparable to its thermal component. Using radio detections from the Very Large Array (VLA), researchers found that there is a ridge of intergalactic polarized emission originating from NGC 7318B, with a total magnetic field strength of 11.0 ± 2.2 μG and an ordered component of 2.6 ± 0.8 μG.

Further modeling of the shock region as an isotropic cylinder with a radius of six kpc and a height of 35 kpc, with an integrated flux of 136 millijansky (mJy) at 144 MHz, yields an equipartition magnetic field strength of B_{eq} = 9.5 μG. The radio emission of the shock region of Stephan's Quintet is not primarily produced by diffusive shock acceleration. The Mach number of the shock in the hot gas (M ≈ 3.8) is low, making it inefficient at accelerating cosmic-ray electrons to relativistic energies. The theoretical boost in radio emission from adiabatic compression is compatible with the observed increase, supporting the compression model.

On a larger scale, broadband radio polarimetry using the Westerbork Synthesis Radio Telescope has revealed that Stephan's Quintet hosts an extensive and relatively regular magnetic field spanning at least 60 × 40 × 20 kpc and has a strength comparable to that found in individual large spiral galaxies. Using the Rotation Measure Synthesis, the magnetic field in Stephan's Quintet is estimated to be 6 μG and 11 μG in the shock region. On the eastern side of Stephan's Quintet, the ordered magnetic field follows the morphology of the H I gas tail, suggesting that the magnetized matter and H I gas are being stripped and expelled from the group together through the same tidal outflow, which carries the magnetic field into the surrounding IGrM.

Chandra observations revealed that the magnetic field influences the stability of the shocked gas. Observations reveal a sharp boundary on the western edge of the shock front, which corresponds to the Hα emission. This sharp interface is interpreted as a contact discontinuity, separating regions of gas with distinct physical properties. Such sharp boundaries are generally susceptible to Kelvin–Helmholtz instabilities. The survival of this sharp edge in Stephan's Quintet suggests that the group's large-scale magnetic field is dynamically suppressing these instabilities and the magnetohydrodynamic forces are actively stabilizing the gas.

== Emissions ==
=== X-rays ===
==== Early observations ====
Stephan's Quintet was among the first compact groups detected in X-rays. In 1984, astronomers used the Einstein Observatory and detected soft X-ray emission centered on the group. The emission was slightly extended and was initially attributed to thermal bremsstrahlung from a hot IGrM with a temperature of approximately 7 million K. ROSAT observations found that Stephan's Quintet has an X-ray luminosity (log(L_{X})) of 42.16 ± 0.04 erg/s and a hot intragroup gas temperature of 0.75 ± 0.08 keV (approximately 9 million K). Stephan's Quintet exhibits extended X-ray emission characterized by a core radius of less than 0.1 arcmin and a β parameter of 0.43.

In 1997, the Japanese Advanced Satellite for Cosmology and Astrophysics (ASCA) detected two X-ray components: a soft, extended component associated with the hot intragroup gas and a hard, compact component associated with the nucleus of NGC 7319. Astronomers applied the Raymond-Smith plasma emission model and found the metallicity of the hot gas to be low (<0.08 solar). The hot gas in Stephan's Quintet appears to be thermally stable; calculations indicated that it would take approximately 7 billion years for the plasma to cool down. The hot gas has a total mass equivalent to approximately 10% of the total mass of the galaxies, making Stephan's Quintet unusually gas-poor compared to other compact groups.

==== Recent studies ====
Stephan's Quintet seen by Chandra X in the X-ray wavelength.

An analysis of data from the Chandra X-ray Observatory, XMM-Newton (XMM), Giant Metrewave Radio Telescope and the Neil Gehrels Swift Observatory found that star formation and supernovae were not the dominant energy sources of the X-ray emission. While the hard X-ray emission suggests that it originates from high-mass X-ray binaries (HMXBs), the starburst region (SQ–A), which has a similar SFR to the ridge, was faint in X-rays. Hence, astronomers suggested that star formation alone could not account for the X-ray emission from the ridge. XMM observations also revealed a far more diffuse X-ray component spanning roughly 130–150 kpc. This diffuse X-ray component cannot be explained by the shock wave alone. Instead, astronomers proposed that the hot intragroup gas mixed with the diffuse emission from a halo of stripped stars. The complex and asymmetrical shape of this structure suggests that this group is not dynamically relaxed.

Chandra resolved 14 X-ray sources in Stephan's Quintet. The brightest source was the nucleus of NGC 7319 with an intrinsic luminosity of 1.1 × 10^{43} erg/s. The foreground galaxy NGC 7320 was found to contain three X-ray sources, in which none was identified with an optical counterpart, suggesting possible X-ray binaries. Researchers also found an ultraluminous X-ray source (ULX) designated as NGC 7319-X4 that is located within the galaxy NGC 7319. Deep HST imaging found no optical counterparts down to an absolute magnitude of −8.7. Astronomers suggested that this source could be a supernova remnant, a stellar-mass or intermediate-mass black hole (IMBH).

In modeling the shock, researchers found that an incoming flow angle of 30° could reconcile the expected and observed post shock temperatures, assuming an upstream H I temperature of 100 K. Based on the upstream H I temperature, the velocity of the intruder galaxy NGC 7318B is hypersonic (approximately 1,400 km s^{-1}), resulting in an upstream Mach number in the galaxy's rest frame was estimated to be approximately 930, implying a relatively narrow Mach cone and bow shock. The elliptical galaxy NGC 7318A exhibits extended X-ray emission lying directly in the path of the ongoing collision. Researchers propose that the disk of NGC 7318B passed directly through NGC 7318A in an "inverse cartwheel" scenario, although this interpretation remains uncertain.

==== Lyman-alpha ====
The Lyman-alpha emission line of Stephan's Quintet exhibits broad velocity widths of approximately 2000 km/s. This broadening is caused by the resonant scattering of photons within the clumpy, turbulent gas, which traps the radiation and allows only ~10–30% of the Lyα photons to escape. The energies radiated by the X-ray gas at ~10 million K, warm Lyα gas at ~10,000 K and the cold molecular gas at ~100 K are in close agreement, consistent with the turbulent cascade, where the mechanical energy is dissipated across the different phases of the interstellar medium. The Lyα luminosity is comparable to that of the warm molecular hydrogen and hot X-ray gas, with the Lyα flux amounting to 40% of the total H_{2} cooling emission. The data also reveal that, in regions with high-velocity gas, the Lyα emission is heavily absorbed, producing deep absorption features that suppress the high-velocity components seen in lines such as Hβ and [C II].

=== Hα emission ===
A 1998 Hα survey by the Isaac Newton Telescope, the Jacobus Kapteyn Telescope and the IAC80 Telescope revealed distinct patterns in the distribution of the star formation among the group members. NGC 7318B and NGC 7318A contain several scattered star-forming regions and diffuse Hα emission. NGC 7319 has nuclear emission and scattered star-forming regions with 71% of its star formation taking place at its nucleus. The stripped stellar debris in Stephan's Quintet extends as far as the companion galaxy NGC 7320C.

An Hα survey in 2019 using CFHT cataloged 209 individual star-forming regions scattered throughout the tidal debris of Stephan's Quintet. Analysis also found that 22 regions have double-peaked velocity profiles, providing evidence of the cloud-to-cloud collision. Imaging Fourier Transform Spectrometer for the Study of Emission Lines in 2D (SITELLE) at the CFHT revealed that Stephan's Quintet has a diffuse halo of ionized gas, extending far beyond the group's member galaxies.

Spectroscopic analysis of 175 Hα-emitting regions has identified 91 normal H II regions, 17 composite regions and seven "AGN-like" regions using the Baldwin–Phillips–Terlevich diagram. Baldwin–Phillips–Terlevich diagram is used to determine the power source of galaxies or ionized clouds of gas based on [O III]λ5007/Hβ versus [N II]λ6584/Hα. The seven "AGN-like" regions are consistent with fast radiative shocks (175–300 km/s) propagating through the low-density gas. The study also found that the high-radial-velocity strand (>6160 km/s) is metal-poor. In contrast, the low-radial-velocity strand (<6160 km/s) is metal-rich. The most metal-poor region (59b) has an oxygen abundance of 10% of solar metallicity. The most actively star-forming region is Region 26 (2.69 M⊙ yr^{-1}).

More recent observations combining optical spectroscopy from the WHT's Enhanced Area Velocity Explorer (WEAVE) instrument with low-frequency radio data from the Low-Frequency Array (LOFAR), revealed no detectable flux from the cores of NGC 7318A and NGC 7318B after accounting for [N II] contribution. In the region surrounding the shock, there is a clear association of Hα intensity and 144 MHz radio flux density, suggesting an excitation mechanism called shock ionization. However, in the southeast and south-western regions, clusters with intense Hα emission appear with no associated radio emission.

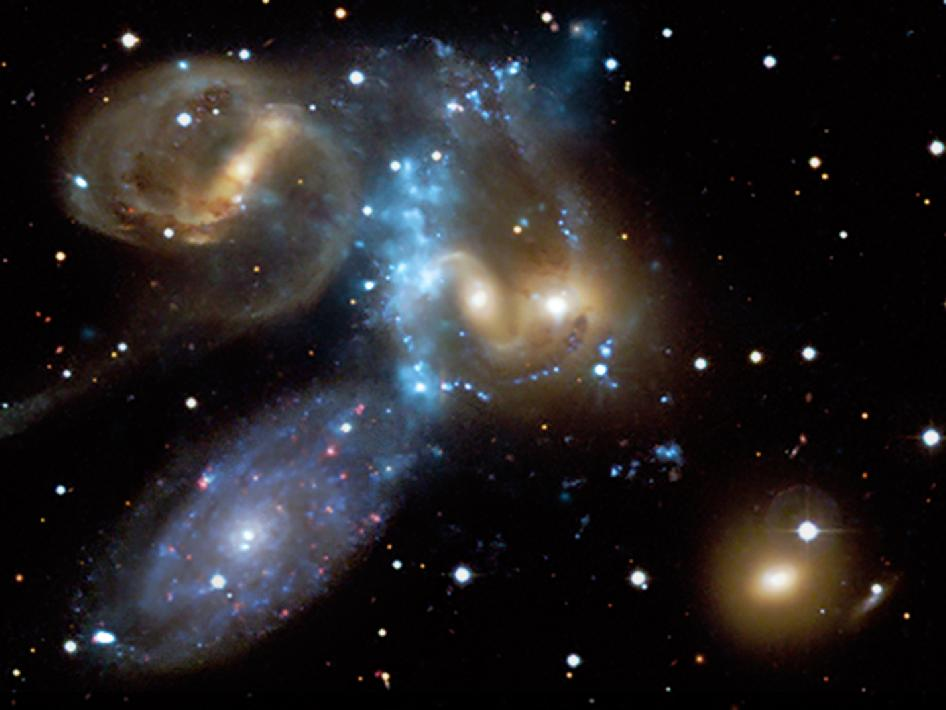
Stephan's Quintet. The blue arc across the top center is a shock caused by colliding intergalactic gas. Image Credits: X-ray (blue): NASA/CXC/CfA/E. O'Sullivan Optical (brown): Canada-France-Hawaii-Telescope/Coelum

=== Infrared ===
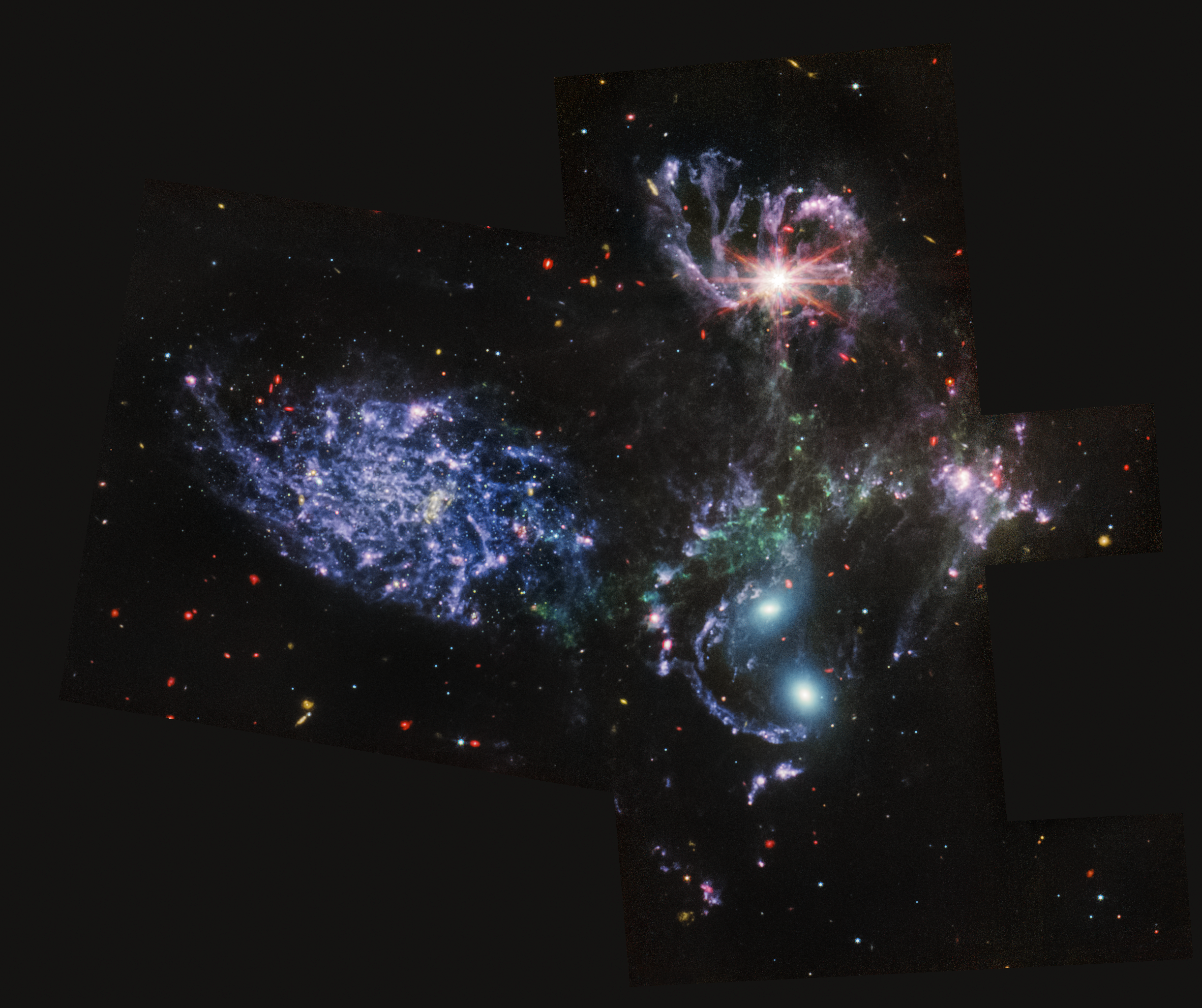
Taken by Mid-Infrared Instrument (MIRI) on the James Webb Space Telescope shows Stephan's Quintet and its surroundings.

==== Infrared emission of the member galaxies ====
Early observations by the Infrared Astronomical Satellite (IRAS) only detected NGC 7319. Mid-infrared observations by the Wide-field Infrared Survey Explorer (WISE) revealed that NGC 7319 dominates the group's mid-infrared emission. The other members (NGC 7318B, NGC 7318A and NGC 7320) have low mid-infrared flux densities and are classified as "Quiescent". NGC 7317 was not detected and only placed an upper limit.

In a survey of Hickson Compact Groups, Spitzer found that several groups exhibit anomalous H_{2} excitation similar to that observed in Stephan's Quintet. Astronomers suggest that shock heating and gas stripping in Stephan's Quintet may rapidly quench star formation in compact groups, potentially moving them into an infrared color-space known as the "canyon". Stephan's Quintet is classified as a Type II Compact Group and intermediate class ( 0.9 > log(M_{HI})/log(M_{dyn}) ≥ 0.8).

Using Infrared Array Camera (IRAC) and Multiband Imaging Photometer (MIPS) aboard Spitzer, Infrared Camera (IRC) aboard AKARI and Photodetector Array Camera and Spectrometer (PACS) and Spectral and Photometric Imaging Receiver (SPIRE) aboard Herschel Space Observatory, Ikeuchi et al. (2026) performed spectral energy distribution modeling of Stephan's Quintet. The dust properties and star formation rates are derived using amorphous carbon (AC) dust composition model. The properties are stated below.

Infrared Properties of Stephan's Quintet
Name	q_{PAH}	ln (M_{dust} [M_{⊙}])	SFR (M_{⊙} yr^{-1})
NGC 7317	(1.61 ± 0.637) × 10^{−1}	13.6 ± 0.53	0.01
NGC 7318A/B	(7.84 ± 0.27) × 10^{−2}	17.2 ± 0.25	0.59
NGC 7319	(4.5 ± 0.83) × 10^{−2}	16.5 ± 0.15	0.78
NGC 7320	(5.24 ± 0.16) × 10^{−2}	14.8 ± 0.24	0.06
SQ–A	(6.84 ± 0.17) × 10^{−2}	16.5 ± 0.19	0.46
SQ–B	(1.08 ± 0.121) × 10^{−1}	15.4 ± 0.25	0.13

Dust masses are presented in their natural logarithms in solar mass units. The PAH-to-dust-mass ratio (q_{PAH}) represents the fraction of dust mass contributed by PAH. The far-infrared (FIR) based star formation rate (SFR) estimates are derived using the amorphous carbon (AC) dust composition model. The highest FIR-based SFR is NGC 7319, while the lowest is NGC 7317. The data analysis reveals that most of the SFR estimates of the galaxies and star-forming region in Stephan's Quintet are below the local star formation main sequence, indicating that the star formation is suppressed within compact groups compared to field galaxies.

==== Dust and Shock emission ====
GALEX, Spitzer and Herschel found that the PAH and dust grain abundances in the shock region are similar to those in the Milky Way's diffuse interstellar medium. Astronomers proposed that the surviving dust was originally located in pre-shocked gas clumps. Because of their high densities, these clumps slowed the shock to approximately 200 km/s, which was insufficient for substantial dust destruction. Furthermore, the UV radiation field in the shock region is approximately 1.4 times the strength of the standard interstellar radiation field.

==== Far-infrared Spectroscopy ====
Far-infrared observations with Herschel have revealed that the massive 35 × 15 kpc shock filament is energized by a turbulent cascade. Analysis revealed that the ionized carbon [C II]-to-PAH emission ratio is unusually high, which cannot be adequately explained by ultraviolet heating by young stars. Researchers conclude that the emission is driven by dissipation of kinetic energy from the high-speed collision. The [C II] and [O I] 63 μm emission lines in the filament are unusually broad, with velocities exceeding 1,000 km/s. The gas has a large velocity spread ranging from the intruder galaxy (5774 km/s) to the IGrM (6700 km/s). Chemical models matching the observed line ratios revealed that the gas is warm (90–200 K) and moderately dense (~10^{3} cm^{-3}). The absence of [N II] emission, together with unusually broad [C II]/PAH_{tot} and [C II]/FIR emission-lines, excludes heating by H II regions, and the X-ray luminosity is insufficient to explain the observed [C II] and H_{2} emission.

Far-infrared photometry revealed emission from water vapor (H_{2}O). The detection of a para-H_{2}O line indicates extremely dense gas clumps (>10^{3} cm^{-3}) within the filament, heated to approximately 80–100K. Spectroscopic detections with Herschel detected NGC 7319 at 1,113 GHz but no emission was detected at other OH^{+} lines. While this could be attributed to highly ionized water (ortho-H_{2}O^{+}), this scenario was ruled out due to the non-detection of other expected ionized molecules, such as OH^{+}.

=== Radio ===
==== Early observations ====
Early radio observations using Mullard Radio Astronomy Observatory found that Stephan's Quintet has a radio luminosity of P_{1421} = 10^{23} W Hz^{-1} sr^{-1}. Further observations of the shock ridge in Stephan's Quintet using VLA in 1981 sparked a debate over the origin of the relativistic electrons producing synchrotron emission. Astronomers proposed two scenarios: one in which electrons are accelerated alongside the compression of the magnetic fields in the shock wave, and another in which electrons were injected by supernovae associated with a massive burst of star formation triggered by the collision. The unusually large width of the radio ridge (approximately 2 kpc) and steep radio spectral index suggested that the electrons might be aging.

Two unusual emission-line filaments in the tidal arm of NGC 7318B were detected by the Kiso Observatory in 1998 and were found to exhibit a high [S II]/Hα ratio and velocity widths of approximately 900 km/s, leading researchers to identify them as complexes of supernova remnants (SNRs). Astronomers proposed that 100,000 to 1,000,000 of supernovae must have exploded nearly simultaneously in this region 1 million years ago. The opposing spiral arms of NGC 7318B resemble the tidal tails of the Antennae Galaxies, suggesting that NGC 7318B may have undergone a major merger. Numerical simulations suggest that NGC 7318B was involved in an earlier merger on a "retrograde orbit", in which both galaxies rotated in opposite directions when they collided.

==== Recent observations ====
Radio spectral index is used for classifying cosmic radio sources and understanding the origin of the sources. Spectral analysis of the radio ridge reveals that the main ridge exhibits a relatively flat radio spectrum ($\alpha^{6 GHz}_{144 MHz}$ ≈ −1.00), which is usual for synchrotron emission from relativistic electrons. The region immediately southwest of SQ–A and northwestern extension show a steeper spectrum ($\alpha^{6 GHz}_{144 MHz}$ ≈ −1.2), which is generally associated with aging cosmic-ray electrons. A spectral curvature gradient is observed along the ridge, with the northern section showing high curvature (older electrons) and the southern section showing no curvature (younger electrons). By comparing the velocity of the intruder galaxy NGC 7318B (5774 km/s) with the extended H I gas (6,600 km/s), astronomers estimate the collision velocity to be approximately 825–895 km/s. The diffuse radio filament associated with the large-scale shock region exhibits a boomerang-like shape, extending 25 kpc to the northwest and 60 kpc in the north-south direction, terminating near the foreground galaxy NGC 7320.

Stephan's Quintet exhibits an unusually low far-infrared-to-radio-ratio (q = 1.23 ± 0.27). In the radio ridge itself, the q value drops below 0.59, making it more than 50 times "radio-loud" for its infrared luminosity. If this radio emission were produced by a starburst, it would require a SFR of at least 30 M⊙ yr^{-1}, for which no equivalent optical or Hα emission was detected. The nucleus of the intruder galaxy NGC 7318B is radio-quiet. Synchrotron radiation is produced by the lightest charged particles (electrons) that are accelerated to kinetic energies far greater than m_{e}c^{2}.

Standard Diffusive Shock Acceleration (DSA) models, which are used to explain 'radio relics' seen in massive galaxy clusters, predict a steep radio spectrum, which is hardly ever observed in low-mass groups. However, the southern end of the SQ shock ridge reveals an unusually flat spectral index (α > −1.00), and its radio power is several orders of magnitude higher than expected for a group of its mass (~10^{13} M_{⊙}). To explain this, astronomers propose that the shock wave is not accelerating new particles, but re-accelerating existing cosmic-ray electrons (via first-order Fermi acceleration) from the H I gas.

== Active Galactic Nucleus ==
Composition of the gas around NGC 7319's Seyfert nucleus.

=== NGC 7319 ===
==== Nuclear properties ====
NGC 7319 hosts a Seyfert 2 nucleus. A massive nuclear wind has been observed blowing southwest of NGC 7319's nucleus at a blueshifted velocity of approximately 500 km/s. Emission-line-diagnostic supports its classifications as an active galactic nucleus, with a log([N II]/Hα) of +0.16 and a strong [O III]/Hβ ratio (log = 1.000). NGC 7319 has a steeply rising red continuum and a prominent silicate absorption at 9.7 μm. This indicates that NGC 7319's AGN is buried within a thick screen of cold silicate dust. NGC 7319 has an AGN fraction (f_{AGN}) of 1.00 ± 0.101, an optical luminosity of (5.68 ± 0.81) × 10¹⁰ L⊙ and an infrared luminosity of (4.45 ± 0.663) × 10^{11} L⊙. Faint UV emission from the nucleus of NGC 7319 indicates a substantial dust extinction, consistent with its classification as an obscured Seyfert galaxy. Emission-line diagnostic diagrams indicate that ionization of gas in NGC 7319 is driven by both AGN photoionization and shock excitation. Radio continuum data from the VLA identified NGC 7319 as a strong source with a total flux of 24.74 mJy, of which 19.99 mJy originates from the nucleus, indicating an AGN-dominated radio source.

==== Ionized gas outflows ====
Observations by Apache Point Observatory and Kitt Peak Ohio State Multi-Object Spectrograph have been used to investigate the kinematics of the ionized gas. These observations provided the basis for the first biconical outflow model of the narrow-line region of NGC 7319, with outflow radial velocities up to 550 km/s peaking approximately 2.6 kpc from the central supermassive black hole. A transition from AGN-powered outflows to gravitationally powered tidal flows was observed at a projected distance between 2.4 and 6.3 kpc. The gas shows Seyfert-like ionization out to 6.3 kpc, beyond which the emission is predominantly powered by tidal flows. Analysis shows that NGC 7319 has a more variable rotation curve than those observed in normal spiral galaxies and its kinematics are disturbed. The AGN in NGC 7319 has outflows of ionized gas similar to those observed in Seyfert galaxies outside compact groups. The outflows have a biconical outflow structure in which velocities increase to a turnover point and then decrease towards the systemic velocity over scales of hundreds to thousands of parsecs. Along the major axis, the ionized gas in the nuclear region clearly shows Seyfert-like ionization, while two locations toward the tidal bridge show low-ionization nuclear emission region (LINER)-like ionization.

Aoki et al. stated that the AGN of NGC 7319 drives one of the largest ionized gas outflows observed for a Seyfert galaxy. Observations measured an outflow velocity of 500 km/s extending roughly four kpc from its nucleus.

==== X-ray variability ====
NGC 7319 is considered to be a changing-look AGN candidate. By comparing X-ray observations of XMM-Newton (XMM) and Chandra X-ray Observatory taken at different epochs, astronomers found variations in NGC 7319's X-ray emission. Over a period of approximately seven years, the NGC 7319 X-ray emission varied significantly, with flux changes of up to 38% in both soft (0.5–2 keV) and hard (2–10 keV) energy bands. NGC 7319 was observed to transition between Compton-thick and Compton-thin states, indicating the dense gas surrounding the AGN is changing rapidly. Compton-thick is defined by hydrogen column density (N_{H} ≥ 1.5 × 10^{24}), which indicates the AGN is heavily obscured by a dense column of gas and dust. In contrast, Compton-thin is defined by N_{H} < 1.5 × 10^{24} cm^{-2}, which indicates the gas column is thin enough for hard X-ray radiation, though the source may still be obscured.

=== Radio jets ===
NGC 7319 hosts low-power radio jets (L_{1.4GHz} = 3.3 × 10^{22} W Hz^{-1}) associated with two asymmetric radio hotspots, extending 430 pc to the north and 1.5 kpc to the south. The JWST observations show that the jets are slowed as they interact with dense dust lanes in the galaxy's disk, producing an accumulation of warm and hot molecular hydrogen at the inner hotspot (N2). In contrast, the outer hotspot (S2) is a highly ionized bow shock (~220–300 km/s), suggesting the low-power radio jets have propagated into a more diffuse medium. The [Ne V]/[Ne II] ratio of the Southern lobe is 0.60, compared with 0.22 for the Northern lobe, indicating a higher degree of ionization in the Southern lobe. The spectrum of the active nucleus and its northern hotspot contains lines of highly ionized iron ([Fe VII]) and neon ([Ne V]).

Xanthopoulos et al. suggested that NGC 7319 is the first candidate of jet-induced star formation in a Seyfert galaxy. Ultraviolet imaging by the Hubble Space Telescope (HST) revealed a chain of young, hot star-forming regions extending along the path of the galaxy's northern radio jet. This UV emission is aligned with the radio plasma and has sharp boundaries and knotty morphology characteristic of star formation. Because the X-ray emission is tightly focused on the nucleus and no polarized AGN continuum is found in the extended UV regions, astronomers proposed that the relativistic jets are colliding with the dense ambient gas, creating a bow shock that triggers star formation.

High-resolution imaging from the MERLIN array revealed a complex, triple-component radio structure in NGC 7319, consisting of a central core and two asymmetrical lobes. The northern lobe appears significantly brighter than the southern lobe, likely because the relativistic jet is colliding with an over-dense cloud of ambient material. The VLA detected extended radio emission aligned with the optical bar, suggesting either back-flow from the radio jets or ongoing star formation within the bar itself, which is estimated to be forming stars at a rate of approximately 8.4 M⊙ yr^{-1}.

Observations with the Infrared Space Observatory (ISO) and VLA reveal that the radio jets emanating from the nucleus of NGC 7319 have closely aligned with the extended Hα and [N II] emission-line region, indicating the jets are compressing and brightening the line-emitting gas in the galaxy. NGC 7319 is a bright radio source with Fanaroff–Riley class II (FR II)-like lobes.

NGC 7319's Active Galactic Nucleus, a supermassive black hole 24 million times the mass of the Sun and electromagnetic radiation worth of 40 billion Suns

=== Other nuclear activity ===
Astronomers propose that NGC 7320C hosts an active galactic nucleus, as it exhibits Hα emission with a broad [N II]λ6584 emission line, which is a signature of a Seyfert nucleus. A large-scale spectroscopic survey identified an active galactic nucleus in NGC 7317.

== Star formation and tidal structures ==
=== Star formation ===
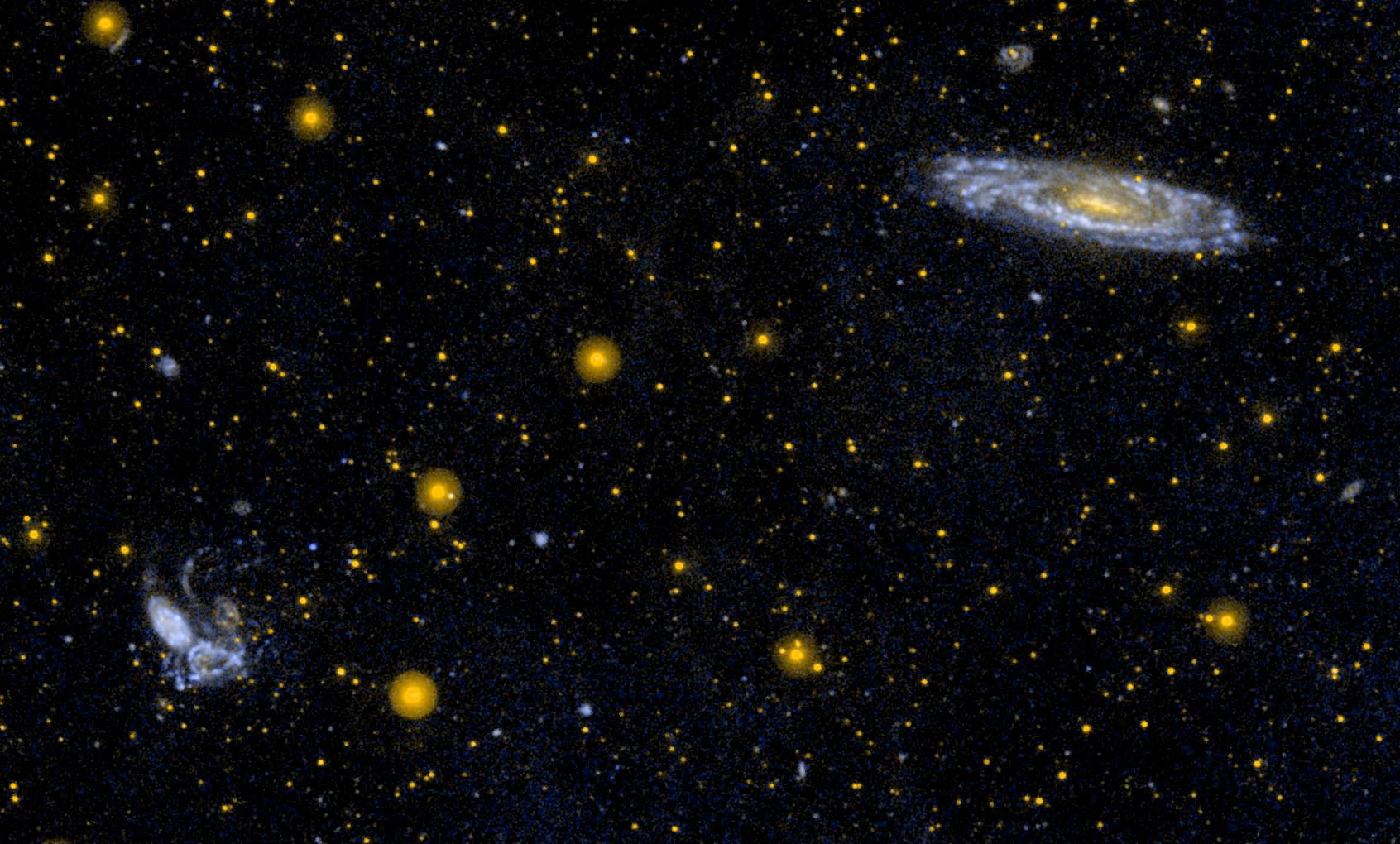
Image of Stephan's Quintet by GALEX

A study reported a total SFR_{total}(FUV) of ~3.41 M⊙ yr^{-1}, with 20.8% occurring in the IGrM (SFR_{IGrM}(FUV)/SFR_{total}(FUV)). The total ultraviolet SFR of Stephan's Quintet is 6.69 ± 0.65 M⊙ yr^{-1}, with 1.34 ± 0.16 M⊙ yr^{-1} contributed by SQ–A, approximately 1.98 M⊙ yr^{-1} by NGC 7319 and approximately 3.37 M⊙ yr^{-1} by NGC 7318B. Despite their unusual ultraviolet (UV) morphology, NGC 7319 and NGC 7318B have SFR equivalent to a typical spiral galaxy. Observations with the Gemini South Observatory and the GALEX found that there are 12 star-forming regions in the H I tail of NGC 7319. Their ages are 2-100 million years.

Studies found that the "young tail" from NGC 7319 contributes about 15% of the NGC 7319's SFR, while the "old tail" contains a single stellar population with an estimated age of 320 million years. The UV-emitting structure associated with NGC 7318B forms an approximately 80 kpc UV disk that is located between NGC 7318A and NGC 7318B. The UV disk belongs almost entirely to NGC 7318B, as the contribution by NGC 7318A is insignificant.

In a UV survey of the Hickson Compact Groups, 36 UV-bright regions were identified, and 78% of the intragroup star-forming regions have extremely blue far-ultraviolet to near-ultraviolet (FUV-NUV) colors, indicating that they are dominated by young and massive stars. These intragroup star-forming regions have ages below 40 million years. Of 36 regions, four regions are intergalactic H II Regions (IHII) and 10 tidal dwarf galaxies. Observations of carbon monoxide using the Berkeley-Illinois-Maryland Association (BIMA) array detected a substantial reservoir of (3.6–8.0) × 10^{8} M_{⊙} of CO gas with a SFE of 8.6 L_{⊙}/M_{⊙} in the IGrM of Stephan's Quintet.

=== Intergalactic Star formation ===
A 2004 study using the Gemini Multi-Object Spectrograph (GMOS) identified four isolated intergalactic H II regions. All four regions were found to be located more than 25 kpc from their parent galaxy NGC 7319. All four regions have average ages of 3.2–5.6 million years and masses of approximately 10^{4} M_{⊙}. They have metallicities that match the stripped gas, indicating that they formed outside of their parent galaxy, directly in the IGrM.

SQ-5 is a very blue, compact star-forming complex located towards a gaseous tidal tail and has an absence of any evolved stellar population. Its spectral energy distribution (SED) closely resembles the low-metallicity starburst galaxy Markarian 930. Based on the UV-to-IR ratio of SQ-5, SQ-5 have a young stellar population typical of a blue compact galaxy, but the mid-IR emission is highly consistent with solar metallicity galaxies.

SQ-2 is an intergalactic star forming region located on the tip-tail region of NGC 7319's "young tail". Stellar population modeling gives SQ-2 a best-fit age of approximately 30 million years (for a short starburst) and up to 100–200 million years (for a continuous star formation), though these values are upper-limits depending on the presence of older stars. SQ-2 has a total stellar mass of 1.78 × 10^{8} M_{⊙}. When comparing the SED of SQ-2 with known galaxies, the closest match is the metal-rich, dusty spiral Whirlpool Galaxy.

=== H II regions ===
In the 1970s, astronomers used instruments such as the Jet Propulsion Laboratory's Joyce-Loebl isodensity tracer and the 200-inch Hale Telescope to study H II regions in the field of Stephan's Quintet and NGC 7331. The surveys identified 24 high-velocity H II regions and 18 low-velocity H II regions. Integral-field spectroscopy by Potsdam Multi-Aperture Spectrophotometer (PMAS) and its PPAK fiber bundle at the Calar Alto Observatory revealed a compact emission-line region southwest of NGC 7317. Using its Hα luminosity, researchers estimated the mass of the ionizing stellar cluster to be 2.2 × 10^{4} M_{⊙}.

GMOS observations identified ~40 individual H II Regions. The H II Regions have SFRs ranging from 0.001 to 0.027 M⊙/yr and stellar mass of approximately 0.8–6.1 × 10^{6} M⊙. Two knots, K-10006 and K-30109, are considerably more luminous than other regions, with Hα luminosities approximately 0.65 and 0.33 times of 30 Doradus, respectively.

=== Star clusters ===
An analysis of observations obtained from the HST Wide Field Planetary Camera 2 in 2001 identified 175 star cluster candidates in Stephan's Quintet. Most of the star cluster candidates were detected in the tidal debris outside the member galaxies of Stephan's Quintet. Analysis also found that 20 clusters had absolute magnitude brighter than −12.0. By comparison, the brightest globular clusters in the Milky Way are only M_{V} = −11.0. This indicates that the star clusters candidates in Stephan's Quintet are more luminous than the brightest globular clusters in the Milky Way. A subsequent HST study published in 2011 found that there are 495 star cluster candidates (SCCs). The "old tail" is estimated to have formed 400 million years ago and consists of 33 SCCs. The "young tail" is estimated to have formed 150-200 million years ago and has 25 SCCs. The elliptical galaxy NGC 7317 is known to host SCCs over 2 billion years.

A blue, visual and infrared (BVI) survey conducted by HST has identified 5,391 sources, of which 29.4% were classified as super star cluster candidates (SSCs). A population of intermediate-age clusters (100–500 million years old) is thought to have formed during the earlier interactions among NGC 7319, NGC 7320C and NGC 7318A. High-resolution imaging from HST and JWST of Stephan's Quintet found 1,588 high-confidence point sources. The cluster population exhibits a bimodal age distribution, with peaks at approximately 0-10 million years and 100 million–1 billion years, and a deficit of intermediate-age clusters (10–100 million years). Most SSCs are low-mass (m < 10^{4.5} M_{⊙}), although a small number of older SSCs have higher masses (m > 10^{5} M_{⊙}).

Location of star clusters candidates in Stephan's Quintet by Gemini Observatory and HST. T118, T111a-d and T112 are among the clusters identified.

Spectroscopic surveys of the tidal debris have identified 21 young massive clusters and one candidate tidal dwarf galaxy. One particularly massive cluster, T118, is extended, with a radius of 12-15 parsecs, an age of approximately 125 million years and an absolute magnitude of -13.2. The estimated mass of T118 (~2 × 10^{6} M⊙) substantially exceeds the estimated masses of RSGC 1 and RSGC 2. However, it is still less massive than W3 in NGC 7252, whose mass is 8 × 10^{7} M⊙. Researchers have suggested that T118 could be an ultra-compact dwarf (UCD). T114 and several others in the Southern Debris region exhibit super-solar metallicities. These high metallicities were attributed to their formation from metal-enriched tidal debris originating from a spiral galaxy. Out of 21 clusters, 14 have estimated to be younger than 6.8 million years. Clusters such as T111a–d and T112 have velocities consistent with the galaxy NGC 7318B, suggesting they formed from gas stripped from its spiral arms during the collision. The region southwest of NGC 7318A contains a mix of old globular clusters likely belonging to the elliptical NGC 7317, alongside young clusters T113–116 that are less than seven million years.

=== Candidate tidal dwarf galaxies ===
Tidal Dwarf Galaxies are formed from the material stripped off the parent galaxies during a collision between massive galaxies. TDGs are mainly observed through molecular gas which is detected through carbon monoxide emission, as molecular gas play a crucial role in the formation of galaxies. The authors noted that TDGs require no dark matter. In contrast, most of the dwarf galaxies are dark matter rich, indicating they are not formed in a tidal tail.

Nikiel-Wroczynski et al. suggested Stephan's Quintet hosts at least 13 candidate tidal dwarf galaxies (TDGs) in Stephan's Quintet. In another survey, astronomers identified seven candidate TDGs in Stephan's Quintet. They have an absolute magnitude ranging from −15.3 to −12.6 and estimated masses ranging from 2.4 × 10^{8} M_{⊙} to 1.38 × 10^{10} M_{⊙}. They have magnitudes (M_{B} = −16.1 to −12.6), sizes (~ 3.5 $h^{-1}_{75}$ kpc) and gas velocity gradients (~8–26 h_{75} km s^{-1} kpc^{-1}) that are typical TDGs. Out of seven candidates, two are located at the edge of the tidal tail, one lies within it and four are isolated, with no optical bridge connecting them to their parent galaxies. Researchers suggest that at least two candidates may form self-gravitating dwarf galaxies and potentially become new members of Stephan's Quintet.

==== SQ–A ====
SQ–A (also known as the starburst region) is an extranuclear star-forming region, located north of the interacting pair NGC 7318. It is produced by a high-speed collision between two massive gas systems that have three distinct velocity components: the gas associated with the intragroup medium (IGrM) (~6,900 km/s) is colliding with the gas stripped from intruding galaxy NGC 7318B (~6,000 km/s), creating a bridge of intermediate-velocity gas (~6,600 km/s). This head-on cloud-to-cloud collision compresses the gas, triggering intense star formation in a region approximately 2 kpc across with a SFR of 1.34 M⊙ yr^{-1}. SQ–A has an age of approximately 10 million years. When both clouds collide, the denser intragroup gas is decelerated and compressed, while the less dense ~6,000 km/s gas is dispersed and swept aside, creating an approximately 5 kpc gap in the gas distribution. SQ–A (~6,600 km/s) has an SFE of +0.51+0.07
−0.07 Gyr^{-1}. The CO in SQ-A has the highest velocity of gas structures in Stephan's Quintet, at approximately 6864 km/s.

Research carried out using JWST and ALMA found that the most intense star formation occurs in the intermediate-velocity "bridge" (6,600 km/s) where both clouds collide. In the intermediate-velocity bridge, the gas clouds have low angular momentum, allowing gravity to overcome centrifugal forces and collapse into stars. This is evidenced by the relatively short gas depletion time (~0.95 million years). In contrast, the intragroup gas possesses high angular momentum, which provides a centrifugal barrier that suppresses star formation. This is indicated by the depletion time of approximately 19.5 million years and the lowest SFR (0.07 M_{⊙} yr^{-1}) of the three components, but it has the largest reservoir of molecular gas (1.4 × 10^{8} M_{⊙}). This rotation is likely generated by localized torques from the shocks rather than large-scale rotation of the galaxies. Gas depletion time (t_{dep}) is a timescale where a galaxy or star-forming region would deplete its molecular gas in forming stars.

Further observations using IRAM revealed that ~80–90% of the molecular gas in SQ–A is warm, indicating the shock wave has heated most of the gas. SQ–A is an infrared-bright region within the IGrM of Stephan's Quintet. It has a dust temperature of 22–24 K. It is classified as a collision-triggered starburst in the IGrM, while its classification as a tidal dwarf galaxy is uncertain. Spitzer observations indicated that SQ–A has a dust mass of 0.6 × 10^{7} M_{⊙} and an infrared luminosity of 1.4 × 10^{43} erg/s. SQ–A has a [Si II]/[S III] ratio of only approximately 1.49, indicating SQ–A is dominated by star formation. The extinction estimated from the mid-infrared-to-UV ratio (A_{FUV} = 0.76 ± 0.06) is lower than the value inferred from the Balmer decrement (A_{Hα} ~0.6–2). Ultraviolet and infrared colors indicate the presence of two distinct stellar populations, with estimated ages of 10^{7.4±0.6} and 10^{8.7±0.3} years.

Multiwavelength data analysis revealed that SQ–A has a metallicity slightly higher than the solar value, along with radio and optical signatures of an ordinary star-forming region. A discrepancy between star formation rates derived from the Hα and infrared observations led researchers to suggest that SQ–A may possess a "top-heavy" initial mass function (IMF), producing an unusually high number of massive stars.

==== SQ–B ====
SQ–B is an extranuclear tidal star-forming knot located southwest of NGC 7319, in the dust lanes of its inner "young" H I tidal tail. SQ–B has a mass of (75.5 ± 5.5) × 10^{7} M_{⊙}. SQ–B has a dust mass of 0.37 × 10^{7} M_{⊙} and an infrared luminosity of 0.7 × 10^{43} erg/s. Far-infrared detections revealed a massive, extended region of cold dust surrounding SQ–B, with a broad wing beyond the tidal tail. The diffuse infrared emission is attributed to young stars formed within the tail. TD 92a (SQ–B), located at the tip of NGC 7319's tidal tail, contains a Seyfert 2 nucleus, a prominent bar and shell structures, but no strong Hα emission.

SQ–B is a magnetized tidal dwarf-galaxy candidate, as radio polarimetric observations reveal a high polarization fraction of ~30%, suggesting that its magnetic field is being amplified by a dynamo mechanism. The magnetic field strength of SQ–B is approximately 4.5 ± 0.8 μG, comparable to a normal spiral galaxy. SQ–B has an estimated gas mass of 4.7 × 10^{8} M_{⊙} and a virial mass of 2.0 × 10^{8} M_{⊙}. Based on the virial theorem, SQ–B has a gas mass and virial mass that are roughly comparable, suggesting it has sufficient self-gravity to resist tidal disruption by its parent galaxy.

== Significance ==
Stephan's Quintet seen by Sloan Digital Sky Survey (SDSS).

Stephan's Quintet serves as a laboratory for understanding galaxy evolution in the early universe. Because galaxy interactions are thought to have been more common in the early universe, nearby systems such as Stephan's Quintet provide valuable opportunities to study the physical processes involved in these interactions. Its active dynamical history has been studied across a broad range of wavelengths, from radio to X-ray wavelengths, but not in gamma-ray. These interactions can be divided into two categories: non-impulsive, quasi-continuous interactions between gravitationally bound members, and episodic, highly energetic intrusion by neighboring galaxies and surrounding large-scale structure. Trinchieri et al. (2005) consider Stephan's Quintet to be a textbook example for extragalactic observers studying galaxy evolution. Sulentic et al. suggested that Stephan's Quintet is one of the best "active" compact groups in the southern hemisphere.

Stephan's Quintet has become a natural laboratory for studying the physical processes governing galaxy evolution in groups. Galaxy groups are the building blocks of the universe's large-scale structure and contain roughly 50% of all stellar mass. However, the high temperatures of the intragroup medium prevent the accretion of cold gas onto galaxies. Galaxy interactions strip the interstellar gas from galaxies and mix it into the IGrM. There are three possible fates of this stripped gas: some gas may eventually fall back onto their parent galaxies under their gravitational pull; some low-density gas encounters the hot IGrM and evaporates, becoming ionized and invisible; a significant fraction of the gas will be recycled within the IGrM. Some of the recycled material may collapse under its own gravity and form tidal dwarf galaxies, becoming new members of the group. The ongoing collisions in Stephan's Quintet provide a detailed view of the gas recycling and processing mechanism in the intermediate-mass dark-matter halos.

Astronomers use Stephan's Quintet as an opportunity for understanding the circumgalactic medium of galaxies in the early universe. The broad, shock-powered Lyα emission seen in Stephan's Quintet is similar to the emission observed in high-redshift galaxies and giant Lyα nebulae, such as the Slug Nebula and Spiderweb Galaxy (MRC 1138-262). Whereas the Lyα emission seen in these distant objects is mostly powered by quasars or extreme starbursts, the emission seen in Stephan's Quintet is primarily driven by the dissipation of the mechanical energy released by the collision.

In most normal star-forming galaxies, the [C II]-to-far-infrared (L_{[C II]}/L_{FIR}) ratio rarely exceeds 1%. However, in shock-dominated systems such as Stephan's Quintet, observations have revealed regions with ratios exceeding this usual ceiling, a phenomenon that relates closely to shock-driven turbulence. High-redshift galaxies (z > 1) are known to be turbulent, clumpy, and dominated by gas inflows and collisions. Models predict that gas falling into early dark-matter halos generates shocks, similar to those observed in Stephan's Quintet. Observations indicate that warm molecular hydrogen (H_{2}) dominates the cooling of the shock, contributing ten times more than other individual coolants such as [Si II] 34.82 μm emission-line, even in metal-rich environments. This indicates that H_{2} plays a crucial role in the star formation and cooling of the gas in the early universe.

== In popular culture ==
The angelic figures at the beginning of the 1946 holiday film It's a Wonderful Life are based on images of Stephan's Quintet. The group has also been featured several times as NASA's Astronomy Picture of the Day.

Images of JWST's first images (including Stephan's Quintet) was displayed in Times Square.

== See also ==
- Wild's Triplet
- Zwicky's Triplet
- NGC 7331 Group (Deer Lick Group, about half a degree northeast of Stephan's Quintet)
- Robert's Quartet
- Seyfert's Sextet
- Copeland's Septet
