= NGC 7317 =

Galaxy in the constellation Pegasus

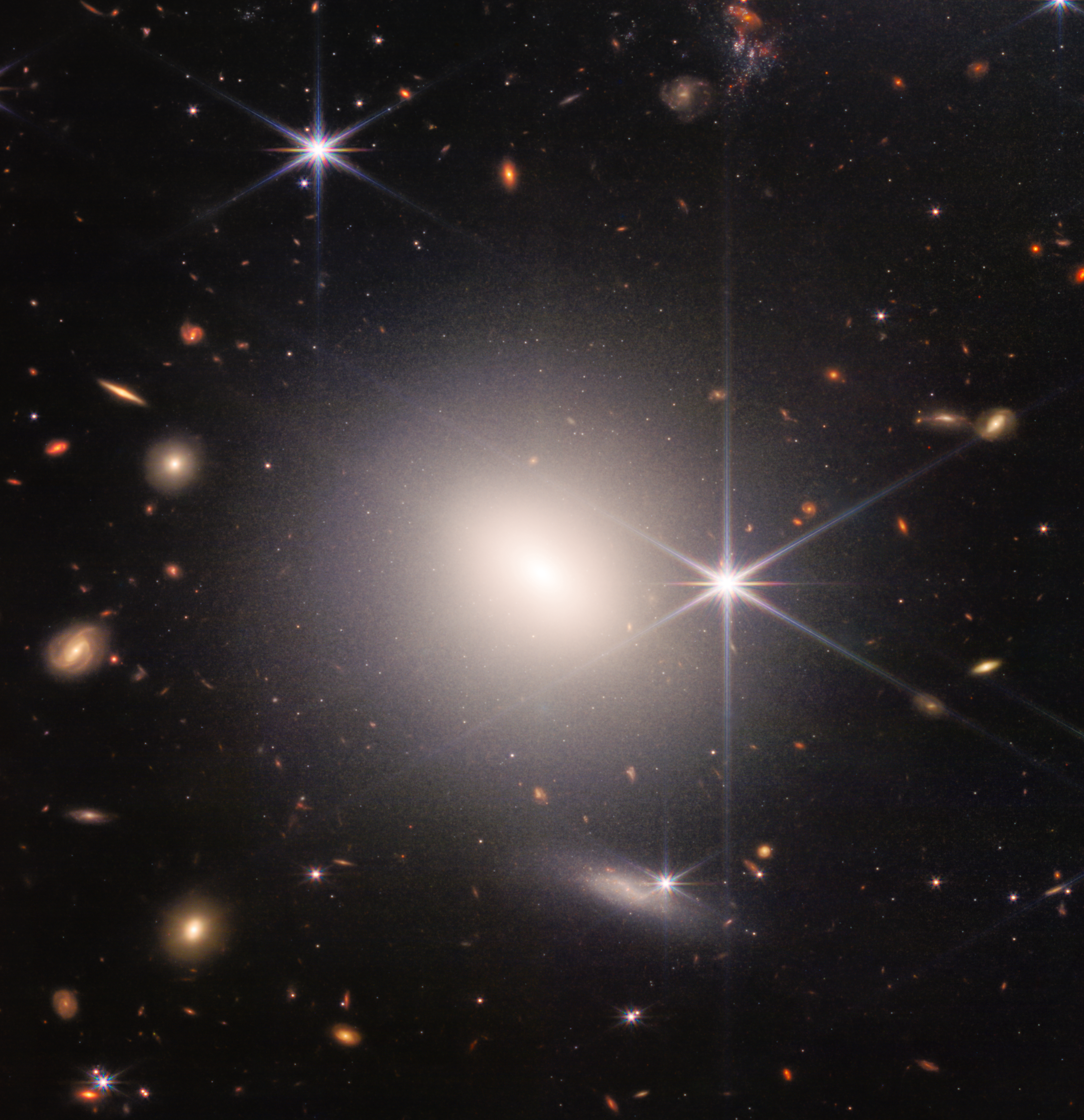
- NGC 7317 imaged by the James Webb Space Telescope

Observation data (J2000 epoch)
- Constellation: Pegasus
- Right ascension: 22^{h} 35^{m} 51.8674^{s}
- Declination: +33° 56′ 41.765″
- Redshift: 0.022012
- Heliocentric radial velocity: 6599 ± 26 km/s
- Distance: 301.7 ± 21.2 Mly (92.51 ± 6.51 Mpc)
- Apparent magnitude (V): 14.57

Characteristics
- Type: E4
- Size: ~107,700 ly (33.03 kpc) (estimated)
- Apparent size (V): 0.4′ x 0.4′

Other designations
- Stephan's Quintet NED01, HCG 92E, HOLM 792D, Arp 319, UGC UGC 12100, MCG +06-49-038, PGC 69256, CGCG 514-060, VV 288d

NGC 7317 is an elliptical galaxy that is a member of Stephan's Quintet in the constellation Pegasus. Its velocity with respect to the cosmic microwave background is 6272 ± 35 km/s, which corresponds to a Hubble distance of 301.7 ± 21.2 Mly (92.51 ± 6.51 Mpc). In addition, four non-redshift measurements give a distance of 294.27 ± 34.22 Mly (90.225 ± 10.491 Mpc). It was discovered on 27 September 1873 by French astronomer Édouard Stephan.

The SIMBAD database lists NGC 7317 as a Seyfert II Galaxy, i.e. it has a quasar-like nucleus with very high surface brightnesses whose spectra reveal strong, high-ionisation emission lines, but unlike quasars, the host galaxy is clearly detectable.

The James Webb Space Telescope photographed it as part of Stephan's Quintet; the image was released on 12 July 2022.

== See also ==
- List of NGC objects (7001–7840)
