= NGC 7320c =

Ring galaxy in the constellation Pegasus

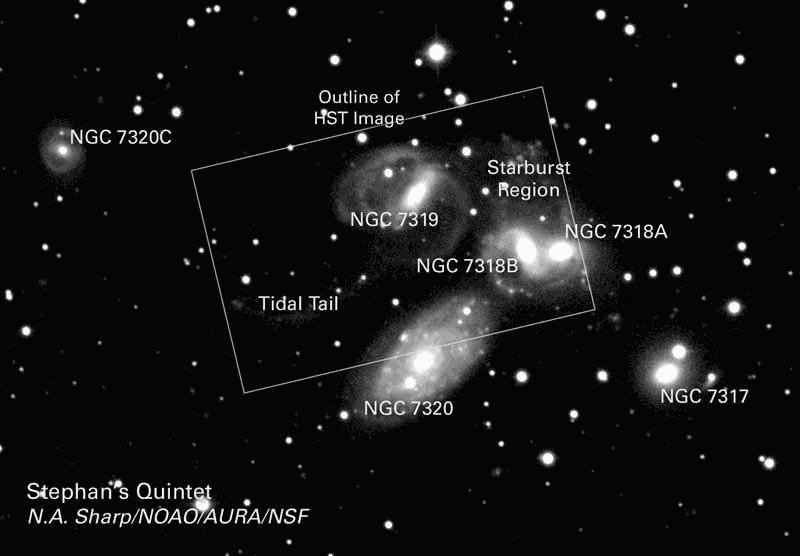
- Stephan's Quintet (NGC 7320c at top left corner)

Observation data (J2000 epoch)
- Constellation: Pegasus
- Right ascension: 22^{h} 36^{m} 20.4^{s}
- Declination: +33° 59′ 6″
- Redshift: 5985 ± 9 km/s
- Heliocentric radial velocity: 6520 km/s
- Distance: 35 Mly
- Apparent magnitude (V): 16.7
- Apparent magnitude (B): 17
- Magnitude (J): 13.525
- Magnitude (H): 12.760
- Magnitude (K): 12.523

Characteristics
- Type: (R)SAB(s)0/a
- Size: 37.44 kiloparsec
- Apparent size (V): 0′.7 × 0′.6

Other designations
- PGC 69279

NGC 7320c is a galaxy member of Hickson Compact Group 92, the four other members of which are also part of the visual group Stephan's Quintet. It is located in the constellation Pegasus.
