= NGC 7331 Group =

Visual grouping of galaxies in the constellation Pegasus

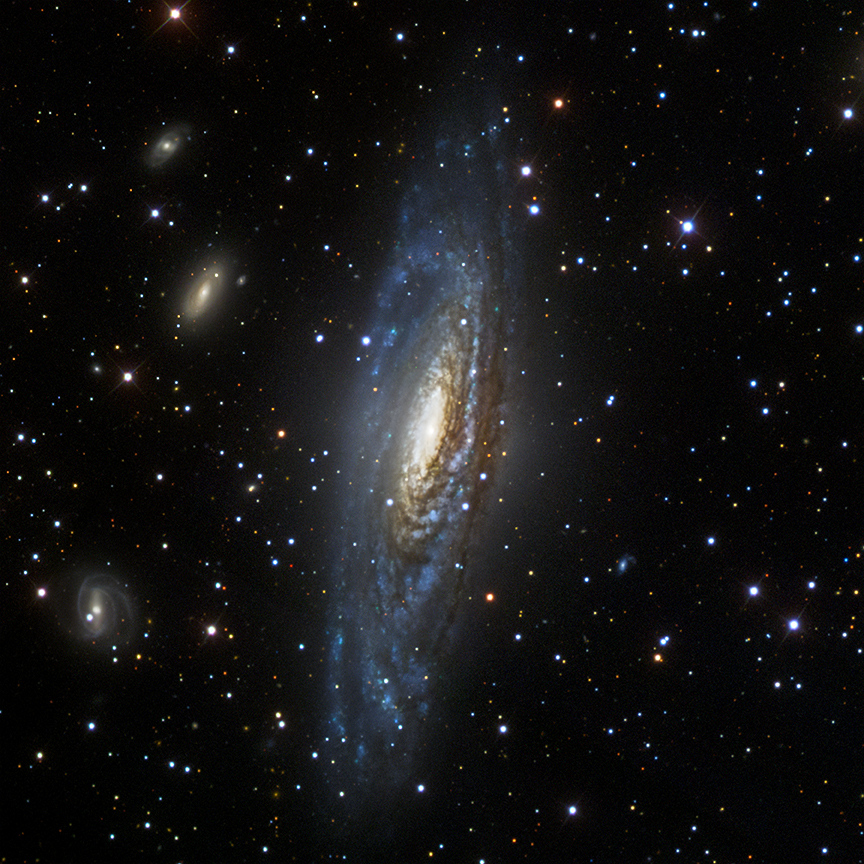
- NGC 7331, along with NGC 7335, 7336, 7337 and 7340

Observation data (Epoch J2000)
- Constellation: Pegasus
- Right ascension: 22^{h} 37^{m}
- Declination: +34° 25′
- Brightest member: NGC 7331
- Number of galaxies: 5
- Parent structure: Perseus–Pisces Supercluster

Other designations
- NGC 7331 Group, LGG 459, Deer Lick Group, Holm 795

The NGC 7331 Group is a visual grouping of galaxies located in the constellation Pegasus. The system is anchored by its largest member, NGC 7331, which lies approximately 40 million light-years (12.3 Mpc) from Earth.

Apparent directly northeast of NGC 7331 are four smaller and much fainter galaxies, known as "the fleas":

- NGC 7335: A lenticular galaxy located 290 million light-years (89 Mpc) away
- NGC 7336: A spiral galaxy located 370 million light-years (113 Mpc) away
- NGC 7337: A barred spiral galaxy located 300 million light-years (92 Mpc) away
- NGC 7340: An elliptical galaxy located 290 million light-years (89 Mpc) away

== Physical vs. visual association ==
Although historical catalogs grouped these objects together due to their visual close proximity, spectroscopic measurements from the NASA/IPAC Extragalactic Database (NED) confirm that the group is an optical grouping caused by line-of-sight alignment rather than a gravitationally bound cluster.

While NGC 7331 sits in the foreground at a heliocentric radial velocity of 816 km/s (redshift 0.002722), the four background companion galaxies exhibit recessional velocities between 6,200 km/s and 8,800 km/s (redshift 0.021 to 0.029 Z). As a result, the four companion galaxies sit at distances ranging from 290 to 370 million light-years.

Image of NGC 7331 Group with Stephan's Quintet on the lower right side

The true physical group bound to NGC 7331 consists of several satellite dwarf galaxies at matching distances, NGC 7363 and NGC 7320 (which visually overlaps Stephan's Quintet), UGC 1206), and UGC 12160.

== Nomenclature and history ==
NGC 7331 was discovered by astronomer William Herschel on September 6, 1784. Swedish astronomer Erik Holmberg cataloged the visual system as Holm 795 in his 1937 study of multiple galaxies.

The popular informal name "Deer Lick Group" was coined in the 1980s by American amateur astronomer Tom Lorenzin to commemorate an exceptional viewing session at the Deerlick Gap Overlook along the Blue Ridge Parkway in North Carolina, where he observed NGC 7331 along with its faint background companion galaxies.

== See also ==
- Stephan's Quintet
- Wild's Triplet
- Zwicky's Triplet
- Robert's Quartet
- Seyfert's Sextet
- Copeland Septet
- NGC 7337
- NGC 7320
