= Muriel Mussells Seyfert =

American astronomer, human computer

Muriel M. Seyfert
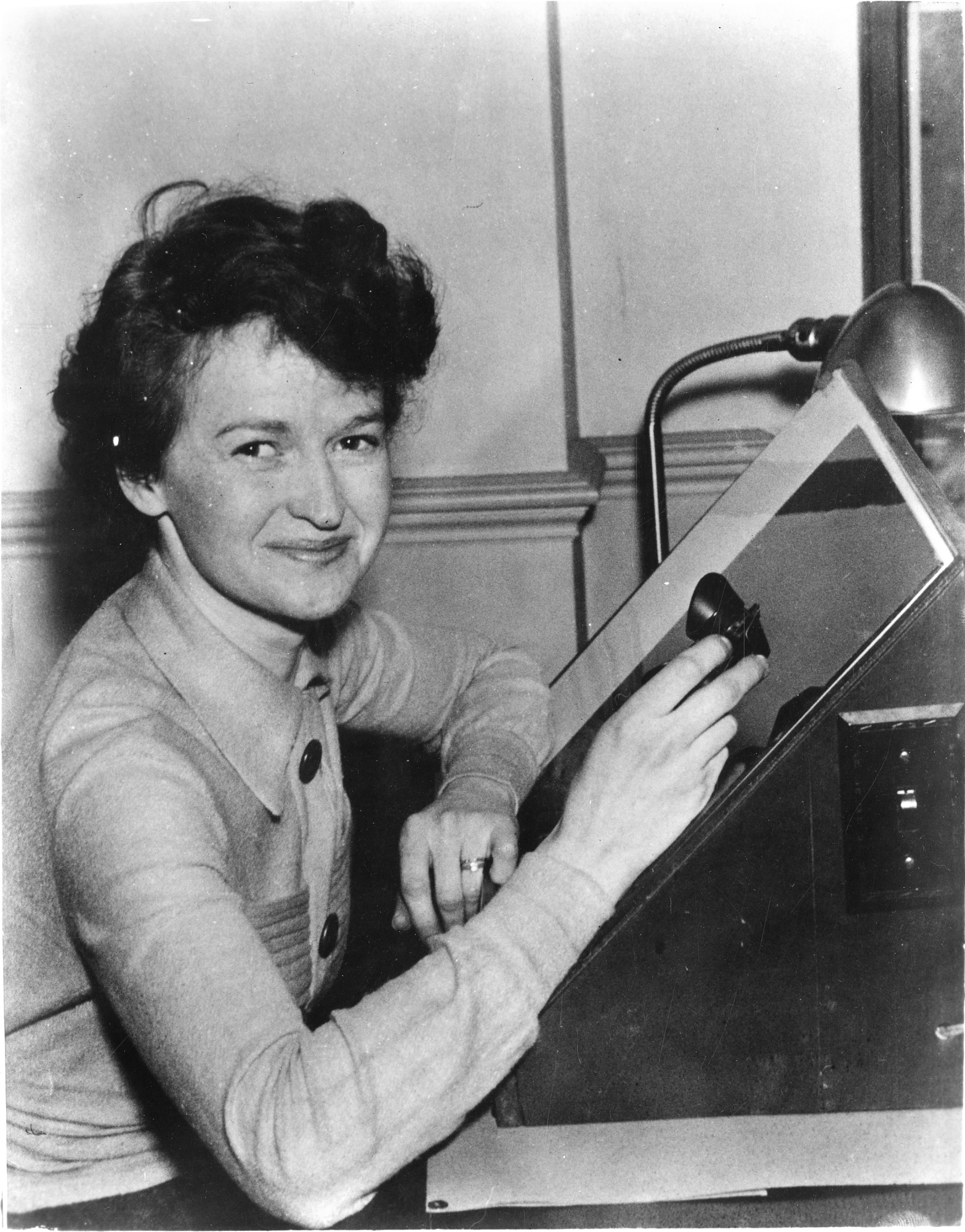
- Born: February 3, 1909; Danvers, Massachusetts
- Died: November 9, 1997 (aged 88); Gainesville, Georgia
- Resting place: Hall County Memorial Park, Gainesville, GA; 34.26833°N 83.86278°W
- Scientific career
- Fields: Astronomer, Portrait artist

Muriel E. Mussells Seyfert (born Muriel Elizabeth Mussells, February 3, 1909 – November 9, 1997) was an American astronomer best known for discovering three "ring nebulae" (planetary nebulae) in the Milky Way while working at the Harvard College Observatory as a human Computer from 1927-1936. The discovery was picked up by the newswires and reported in newspapers across the country. Articles described the objects as "tremendous rings of star-dust" and that "each is believed to be hundreds of times larger than our entire solar system." She is credited for identifying over 100,000 previously unknown galaxies during her time at Harvard "being uniquely skilled at identifying faint galaxies that were difficult to detect." The idea that there were any other galaxies in the universe was only a few years old; her diligent work made a significant impact on the scientific community's understanding of the cosmos.

== Early life ==
Muriel was born on February 3, 1909, in Danvers, Massachusetts, the daughter of George and Stella Mussells. She attended Radcliffe College for her undergraduate degree, graduating in 1931.

== Scientific contributions ==
Mussells Seyfert was employed as a human computer at the Harvard College Observatory. By examining photographic plates taken at Harvard's astronomical station at Bloemfontain, South Africa, she discovered three new ring nebulae in the Milky Way galaxy in the mid-1930s.

== Artist ==
After moving to Nashville, Tennessee with her husband, Muriel continued astronomical research, raised two children, and pursued her passion for painting, maintaining an art studio in the observatory residence (which has since become known as Muriel's Retreat in her honor). Two of her portraits, one of observatory namesake Arthur Dyer and another of her husband, the first observatory director Carl Keenan Seyfert, are located in the Dyer Observatory in a stairway leading up to the Seyfert Telescope. Muriel had other artistic talents, including construction, such as the pool she built outside the observatory's residence. The pool also had a practical purpose; fire suppression. The house was on a mountaintop with a windy, steep road which would be difficult for fire trucks to climb. The pool was connected to a large underground cistern into which the observatory gutters drained.

On March 18, 1952, a one-night art show of her art work was held at the Ryman Auditorium in downtown Nashville.

== Personal life ==
On May 20, 1935, Muriel married Carl Keenan Seyfert who was the founder and first director of Vanderbilt University's Dyer Observatory in Nashville, Tennessee, and the Seyfert galaxies and Seyfert's Sextet would later be named after him. The couple had two children.

Muriel's sister, Sylvia Mussells Lindsay, also worked as a Harvard computer and discovered the first dwarf galaxy, the Sculptor system. She married astronomer Eric Mervyn Lindsay.
