= Carl K. Seyfert =

American astronomer

Carl Keenan Seyfert
- Born: February 11, 1911; Cleveland, Ohio, U.S.
- Died: June 13, 1960 (aged 49); Nashville, Tennessee, U.S.
- Education: Harvard University (Ph.D. 1936)
- Spouse: Muriel E. Mussels (m. 1935)
- Children: Gail and Carl
- Scientific career
- Fields: Astronomy
- Institutions: McDonald Observatory; Mount Wilson Observatory; Case Institute; Dyer Observatory
- Thesis: Studies of the External Galaxies (1936)
- Doctoral advisor: Harlow Shapley

Carl Keenan Seyfert (February 11, 1911 – June 13, 1960) was an American astronomer. He is best known for his 1943 research paper on high-excitation line emission from the centers of some spiral galaxies, which are named Seyfert galaxies after him. Seyfert's Sextet, a group of galaxies, is also named after him.

== Biography ==
Seyfert was born and raised in Cleveland, Ohio, then attended Harvard University, starting in 1929. He earned his B.S. and M.S. degrees in 1933, and his Ph.D. in astronomy in 1936. His thesis was "Studies of the External Galaxies", supervised by Harlow Shapley. The thesis dealt with colors and magnitudes of galaxies.

In 1935 Seyfert married astronomer Muriel Elizabeth Mussels, who was a former Harvard computer who made contributions to the study of ring nebulae. They had two children, daughter Gail Carol and son Carl Keenan Seyfert, Jr.

In 1936 Seyfert joined the staff of the new McDonald Observatory in Texas, where he helped get the observatory started. He stayed until 1940, working with Daniel M. Popper on the properties of faint B stars and continuing his work on colors in spiral galaxies.

In 1940 Seyfert went to Mount Wilson Observatory as a fellow with the National Research Council. He stayed until 1942, studying a class of active galaxies now called Seyfert galaxies. In 1942 he returned to Cleveland, at Case Institute of Technology, where he taught navigation to military personnel and participated in secret military research. He also carried out some astronomical research at the Warner and Swasey Observatory of the Case Institute.

In 1946 Seyfert joined the faculty of Vanderbilt University in Nashville, Tennessee. The astronomy program at Vanderbilt was very small at the time. The university had only a small observatory, equipped with a 6-inch (150 mm) refractor, and only a modest teaching program. Seyfert worked diligently to improve the teaching program and to raise funds to build a new observatory. Within a few years, he had obtained significant public support from the Nashville community. As the result, the Arthur J. Dyer Observatory with its 24-inch (610 mm) reflector was completed in December 1953. Seyfert became director of the new observatory, a position he held until his death. Seyfert was also the local weatherman for WSM-TV, Nashville's NBC affiliate, during the 1950s.

Seyfert died in an automobile accident in Nashville on June 13, 1960; a residential street near the Dyer Observatory was subsequently renamed "Carl Seyfert Memorial Drive" in his honor. A 1949 oil portrait of Seyfert by his wife Muriel Mussels Seyfert, who was a former Harvard computer, hangs in the Dyer Observatory.

== Contributions to astronomy ==
Carl Seyfert published many papers in the astronomical literature, on a wide variety of topics in stellar and galactic astronomy, as well as on observing methods and instrumentation.

In 1943 he published a paper on galaxies with bright nuclei that emit light with emission line spectra with characteristically broadened emission lines. The prototype example is Messier 77 (NGC 1068). It is this class of galaxies that is now known as Seyfert galaxies, in his honor.

During his time at the Case Institute, he and Jason John Nassau obtained the first good color images of nebulae and stellar spectra. In 1951 he observed and described a group of galaxies around NGC 6027, now known as Seyfert's Sextet. He was an active innovator in instrumentation, being involved in new techniques such as the astronomical use of photomultiplier tubes and television techniques, and electronically controlled telescope drives.

The lunar crater Seyfert is named in his honor (29.1N, 114.6E, 110 km diameter). The 24-inch (610 mm) telescope at Dyer Observatory was renamed after him.

== Bibliography ==
- Seyfert, Carl K. (January 1943). "Nuclear Emission in Spiral Nebulae". Astrophysical Journal. 97: 28–40. Bibcode:1943ApJ....97...28S. doi:10.1086/144488.

== See also ==
- Active galactic nucleus
