= NGC 7337 =

Galaxy in the constellation Pegasus

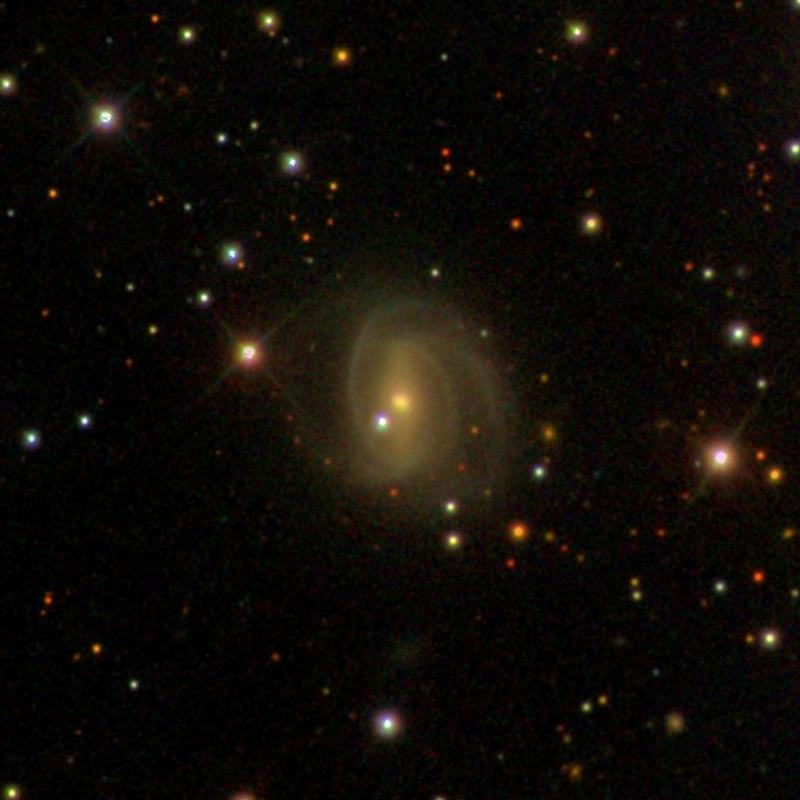
- NGC 7337 imaged by SDSS

Observation data (J2000 epoch)
- Constellation: Pegasus
- Right ascension: 22^{h} 37^{m} 26.6991^{s}
- Declination: +34° 22′ 26.423″
- Redshift: 0.021952±0.0000500
- Heliocentric radial velocity: 6,581±15 km/s
- Distance: 300.9 ± 21.1 Mly (92.26 ± 6.47 Mpc)
- Apparent magnitude (V): 15.24

Characteristics
- Type: SB(rs)b
- Size: ~182,700 ly (56.03 kpc) (estimated)
- Apparent size (V): 1.1′ × 0.9′

Other designations
- HOLM 795B, 2MASX J22372663+3422275, UGC 12120, MCG +06-49-050, PGC 69344, CGCG 514-071

NGC 7337 is an barred spiral galaxy in the constellation of Pegasus. Its velocity with respect to the cosmic microwave background is 6,255±27 km/s, which corresponds to a Hubble distance of 300.9 ± 21.1 Mly (92.26 ± 6.47 Mpc). It was discovered by Irish physicist George Stoney and William Parsons, 3rd Earl of Rosse, on 10 September 1849.

NGC 7337 has a possible active galactic nucleus, i.e. it has a compact region at the center of a galaxy that emits a significant amount of energy across the electromagnetic spectrum, with characteristics indicating that this luminosity is not produced by the stars.

== Galaxy Groups ==
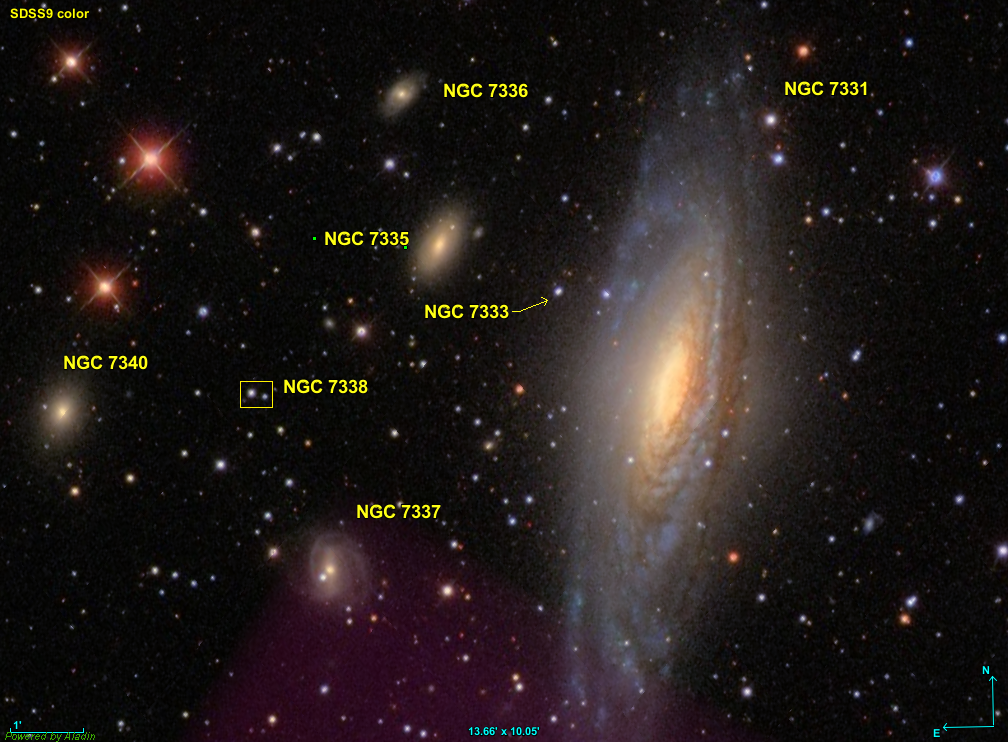
The Deer Lick Group

NGC 7337 is a member of a visual grouping known as the NGC 7331 Group of galaxies (also known as the Deer Lick Group). The members of the group, NGC 7335, NGC 7336, NGC 7337, and NGC 7340, lie far in the background at distances of approximately 300–350 million light years, compared to the group's main galaxy NGC 7331, which is much closer at a distance of approximately 44 million light years.

All of the members of the NGC 7331 Group, along with NGC 7325, NGC 7326, NGC 7327, NGC 7333, NGC 7338, are listed together as Holm 795 in Erik Holmberg's A Study of Double and Multiple Galaxies Together with Inquiries into some General Metagalactic Problems, published in 1937.

== Possible supernova ==
One possible supernova has been observed in NGC 7337:

- SN 1973O (type unknown, mag. 19) was discovered by Kormendy on 4 September 1973. However, a study published in 2013 concluded that this object is actually a foreground galactic variable star.

== See also ==
- List of NGC objects (7001–7840)
- NGC 7331 Group
- NGC 7331
- NGC 7337
- NGC 7320
