= NGC 92 =

Interacting spiral galaxy in Robert's Quartet

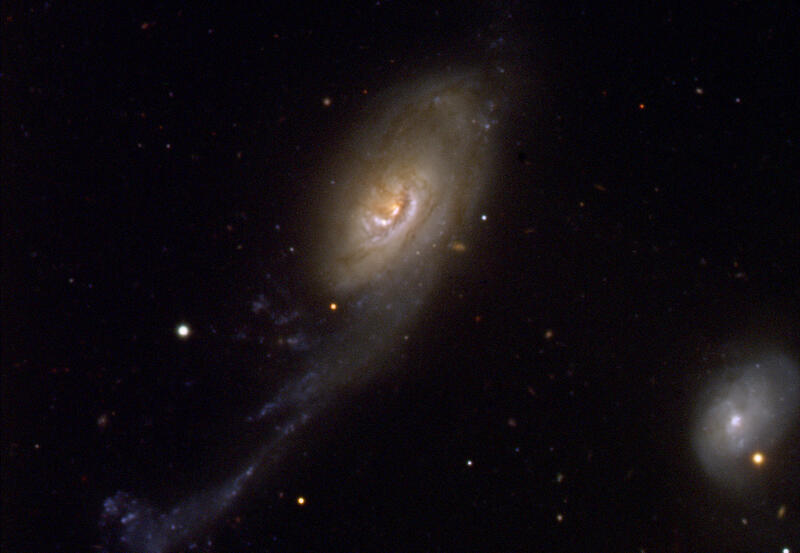
- NGC 92 Imaged by European Southern Observatory, NGC 88 can be seen in lower left side

Observation data (J2000 epoch)
- Constellation: Phoenix
- Right ascension: 00^{h} 21^{m} 31.713^{s}
- Declination: −48° 37′ 29.23″
- Redshift: 0.011278 ± 0.000037
- Distance: 141 Mly (43.2 Mpc)
- Apparent magnitude (V): 13.81

Characteristics
- Type: SAa: pec
- Apparent size (V): 1.9′ × 0.9′

Other designations
- ESO 194-G012, PGC 1388

NGC 92 is an unbarred, interacting spiral galaxy located approximately 141 million light-years away in the southern constellation of Phoenix. It was discovered on September 30, 1834, by the English astronomer John Herschel.

== Physical characteristics ==
NGC 92 is the largest and visually dominant member of its local environment. Classified morphologically as an unbarred spiral galaxy, its structure shows extensive tidal disruption caused by gravitational encounters with neighboring galaxies.

The galaxy features a highly warped disk and an asymmetrical spiral arm structure. Gravitational interactions have pulled out a tidal tail spanning roughly 50,000 to 60,000 light-years in length. This tail is lined with bright, blue star-forming knots containing young OB associations triggered by gravitational tidal forces.

== Group membership ==
NGC 92 is the largest component of Robert's Quartet, a compact galaxy group that also includes NGC 87, NGC 88, and NGC 89. The group members lie within a region spanning approximately 150,000 light-years across and display ongoing tidal interactions. Faint tidal bridges of gas and stars thread between NGC 92 and its neighboring members as they reshuffle material during their gravitational encounters.

== See also ==
- Robert's Quartet
- NGC 87
- NGC 88
- NGC 89
