= NGC 6027c =

Galaxy in the constellation Serpens

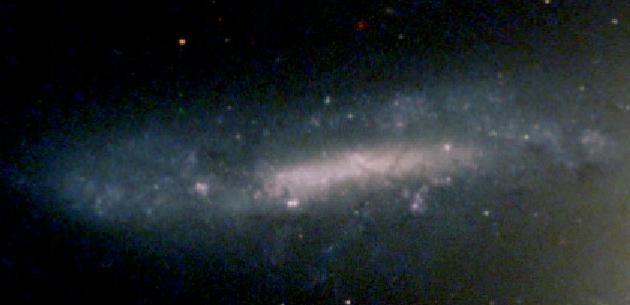
- A Hubble Space Telescope (HST) image of NGC 6027c

Observation data (J2000 epoch)
- Constellation: Serpens
- Right ascension: 15^{h} 59^{m} 11.8^{s}
- Declination: +20° 44′ 49″
- Redshift: 4,620 ± 3 km/s
- Distance: 190 million ly (58 Mpc)
- Apparent magnitude (V): 16.7

Characteristics
- Type: SB(S)c
- Apparent size (V): 0′.9 × 0′.2

Other designations
- UGC 10116 NED04, PGC 56578

NGC 6027c is an interacting peculiar spiral galaxy (type SB(s)c pec) located approximately 190 million light-years (58 Mpc) away in the constellation Serpens. It is a physical member of Seyfert's Sextet (HCG 79), a compact galaxy group undergoing intense gravitational encounters. The galaxy has an apparent visual magnitude of 16.0.

== Physical Characteristics and Environment ==
NGC 6027c is located within the interacting core of Seyfert's Sextet alongside NGC 6027, NGC 6027a, and NGC 6027b. Strong tidal interaction between NGC 6027c and the neighboring group members has caused structural warping in its spiral arms and stripped dust and gas into the intergalactic space of the cluster.

High-resolution imaging from the Hubble Space Telescope shows that despite the severe gravitational disruption affecting its arms, NGC 6027c exhibits relatively low levels of active star formation compared to other compact interacting galaxy systems. Dynamical models predict that NGC 6027c will eventually merge with the other three physical core members of the group over the next several billion years to form a single giant elliptical galaxy.

== See also ==
- NGC 6027
- NGC 6027a
- NGC 6027b
- NGC 6027d
- NGC 6027e
- Seyfert's Sextet
