= NGC 7331 =

Galaxy in the constellation Pegasus

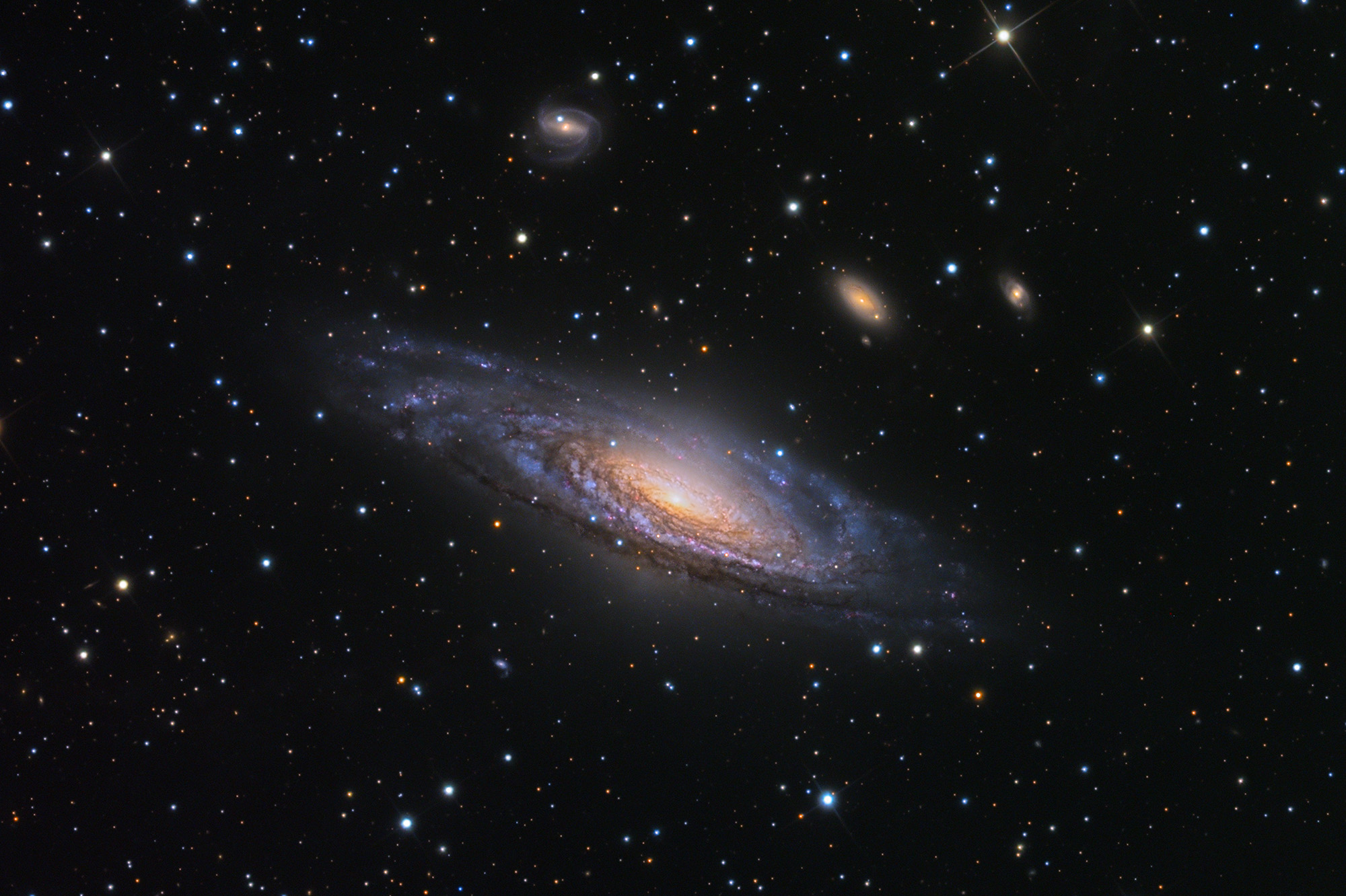
- NGC 7331 imaged by the Phillips 24-inch RCOS Telescope at the Mount Lemmon SkyCenter

Observation data (J2000 epoch)
- Constellation: Pegasus
- Right ascension: 22^{h} 37^{m} 04.0624^{s}
- Declination: +34° 24′ 56.72″
- Redshift: 0.002722±0.000003
- Heliocentric radial velocity: 816±1 km/s
- Galactocentric velocity: 1,030±9 km/s
- Distance: 43.79 ± 8.800 Mly (13.427 ± 2.698 Mpc)
- Apparent magnitude (V): 10.4

Characteristics
- Type: SA(s)b; HII LINER
- Size: 146,250 ly (44.84 kpc) (diameter; 25.0 B-mag arcsec^{−2}) (Note: The quick-look major axis physical diameters given by NED were based on distance estimates of 13.427 ± 2.698 Mpc (43.79×10^{6} ± 8.800×10^{6} ly) using a scale of 65.1 parsec/arcsec multiplied with given angular diameters.); 112,920 ly × 55,316 ly (34.62 kpc × 16.96 kpc) (diameter; "total" magnitude)
- Apparent size (V): 10.5′ × 3.7′

Other designations
- Caldwell 30, HOLM 795A, IRAS 22347+3409, UGC 12113, MCG +06-49-045, PGC 69327, CGCG 514-068

NGC 7331, also known as Caldwell 30, is an unbarred spiral galaxy about 13.427 megaparsecs (43.79 million light-years) away in the constellation Pegasus. It was discovered by William Herschel on 6 September 1784.

The galaxy appears similar almost in size and structure to the Milky Way, and is sometimes referred to as "the Milky Way's twin". However, discoveries in the 2000s regarding the structure of the Milky Way may call this similarity into doubt, particularly because the latter is now believed to be a barred spiral, compared to the unbarred status of NGC 7331. In spiral galaxies the central bulge typically co-rotates with the disk but the bulge in the galaxy NGC 7331 is rotating in the opposite direction to the rest of the disk. In both visible light and infrared photos of the NGC 7331, the core of the galaxy appears to be slightly off-center, with one side of the disk appearing to extend further away from the core than the opposite side.

Using the Wide-field Infrared Survey Explorer's data, NGC 7331 is known to host an Active Galactic Nucleus (AGN) and is bright in all four WISE bands.

== Galaxy Groups ==
NGC 7331 is the brightest galaxy in the field of a visual grouping known as the NGC 7331 Group of galaxies. In fact, the other members of the group, NGC 7335, NGC 7336, NGC 7337 and NGC 7340, lie far in the background at distances of approximately 300–350 million light years.

All of the members of the NGC 7331 Group, along with NGC 7325, NGC 7326, NGC 7327, NGC 7333, NGC 7338, are listed together as Holm 795 in Erik Holmberg's A Study of Double and Multiple Galaxies Together with Inquiries into some General Metagalactic Problems, published in 1937.

It is also catalog in the Lyons Groups of Galaxies as the main member of LGG 459 Group, which consists of 5 members, UGC 12082, NGC 7320, NGC 7363 and UGC 12060. NGC 7331 lies in a region of the sky near the Lacerta I Stellar Association, located 3.6° to its north.

== Supernovae ==
Five supernovae have been observed in NGC 7331:

- SN 1959D (Type II-L, mag. 13.4) was discovered by Milton Humason and Howard S. Gates in a survey at Palomar Observatory on 28 June 1959.
- SN 2013bu (Type II, mag. 16.6) was discovered by Kōichi Itagaki on 21 April 2013.
- SN 2014C was discovered by the Lick Observatory Supernova Search (LOSS) on 5 January 2014. The supernova underwent an unusual "metamorphosis" from a hydrogen-poor Type Ib to a hydrogen-rich Type IIn over the course of a year.
- SN 2025rbs (Type Ia, mag. 17.07) was discovered by GOTO on 14 July 2025. It got as bright as magnitude 11.9, making it the brightest supernova of 2025. By the end of August 2025, the supernova was still around magnitude 14.4.
- SN 2026aaiv (Type Ia, mag. 17.3) was discovered by ATLAS on 1 September 2026. By the end of September 2026, the supernova was starting to dim.
- In addition to the confirmed supernovae, a 1903 photographic plate from Yerkes Observatory shows a magnitude 16.6 candidate transient that may have also been a supernova.
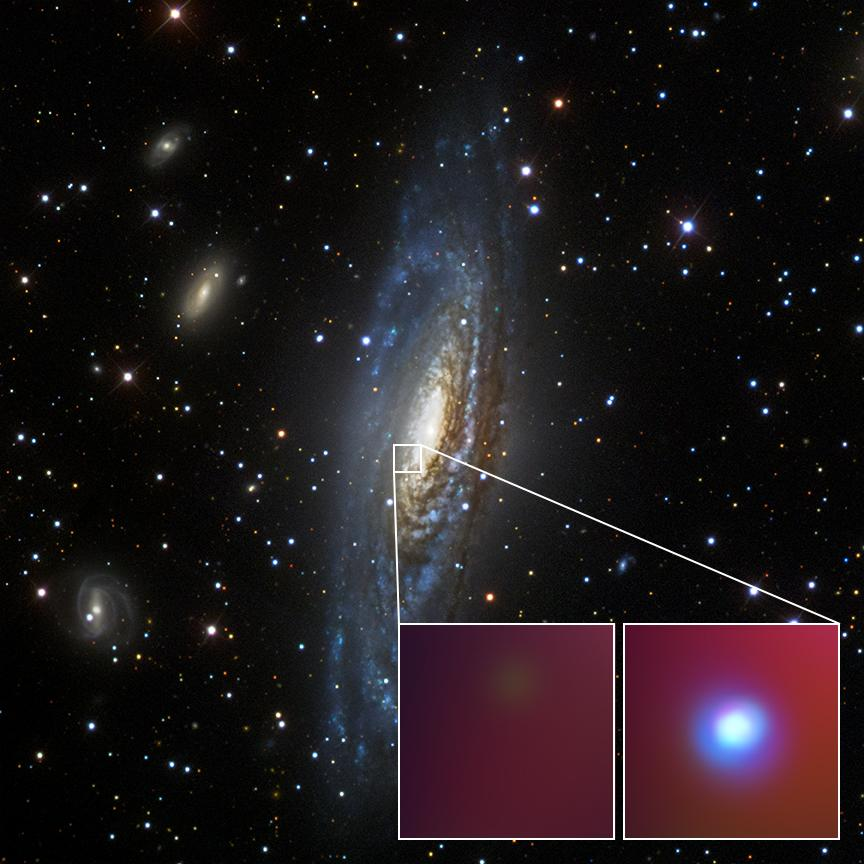
Image of SN 2014C. The inset images are from NASA's Chandra X-ray Observatory, showing a small region of the galaxy before the supernova (left) and after it (right).

Plot of the declining magnitude of SN 2026aaiv in October 2026.

== See also ==
- M94 – another galaxy with a prominent starburst ring
- NGC 1512 – another galaxy with a prominent starburst ring
- Flocculent spiral galaxy
- List of NGC objects (7001–7840)
- List of NGC objects
