= NGC 87 =

Irregular galaxy in the constellation Phoenix

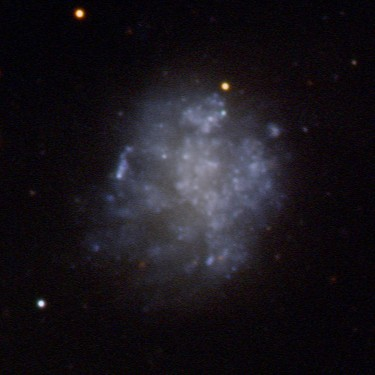
- NGC 87, a warped galaxy in Robert's Quartet

Observation data (J2000 epoch)
- Constellation: Phoenix
- Right ascension: 00^{h} 21^{m} 14.2133^{s}
- Declination: −48° 37′ 42.81″
- Redshift: 0.011391
- Heliocentric radial velocity: 3415 ± 23 km/s
- Distance: 154.7 ± 11.0 Mly (47.44 ± 3.36 Mpc)
- Apparent magnitude (V): 14.1

Characteristics
- Type: IBm pec
- Size: ~51,500 ly (15.80 kpc) (estimated)
- Apparent size (V): 0.9′ × 0.7′

Other designations
- ESO 194-G008, PGC 1357

NGC 87 is a diffuse, irregular galaxy located approximately 155 million light-years away in the southern constellation of Phoenix. It was discovered on September 30, 1834, by the English astronomer John Herschel.

== Physical characteristics ==
NGC 87 is classified morphologically as a diffuse irregular galaxy, displaying a lack of a distinct central nucleus or organized spiral structure. At its distance of 155 million light-years, its angular size corresponds to a physical diameter of roughly 42,000 light-years, making it about 40% the size of the Milky Way.

Unlike its spiral and lenticular companions, NGC 87 contains significant reservoirs of cold neutral hydrogen gas and active H II regions. Its asymmetric appearance and chaotic star-forming areas are driven by tidal interactions with nearby galactic companions.

== Group membership ==
The galaxy is a member of Robert's Quartet, a compact galaxy group located in Phoenix that also includes NGC 88, NGC 89, and NGC 90. The four member galaxies reside within a region spanning roughly 150,000 light-years across and exhibit active gravitational interactions.

== Supernova ==
One supernova has been observed in NGC 87:

- SN 1994Z (Type II, mag. 14.6) was discovered Alexander Wassilieff on 2 October 1994.

== See also ==
- Robert's Quartet
- NGC 88
- NGC 89
- NGC 92
- List of NGC objects (1–1000)
