= NGC 6027b =

Galaxy in the constellation Serpens

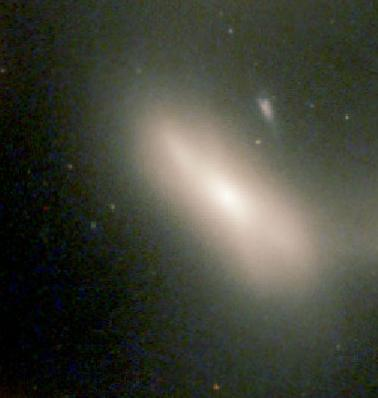
- A Hubble Space Telescope (HST) image of NGC 6027b.

Observation data (J2000 epoch)
- Constellation: Serpens
- Right ascension: 15^{h} 59^{m} 10.8^{s}
- Declination: +20° 45′ 43″
- Redshift: 4053 ± 8 km/s
- Distance: 190 million ly (58 Mpc)
- Group or cluster: Seyfert's Sextet
- Apparent magnitude (V): 15.3

Characteristics
- Type: S0 pec
- Apparent size (V): 0′.4 × 0′.2

Other designations
- UGC 10116, PGC 56584, HCG 79B, VV 115b

NGC 6027b is an interacting peculiar lenticular galaxy located approximately 190 million light-years (58 Mpc) away in the constellation Serpens. It is a physical member of Seyfert's Sextet (HCG 79), a compact galaxy group undergoing strong gravitational interactions. The galaxy has an apparent visual magnitude of 15.3 and an angular size of 0′.4 × 0′.2 arcminutes.

== Physical Characteristics and Environment ==
NGC 6027b sits near the center of Seyfert's Sextet alongside NGC 6027, NGC 6027a, and NGC 6027c. Tidal forces from nearby group members have distorted its structure and stripped dust and interstellar gas from its disk into the intergalactic medium.

Observations by the Hubble Space Telescope show that despite these tidal disruptions, NGC 6027b and the other physical group members currently display low rates of active star formation compared to other compact galaxy groups. Dynamical simulations suggest that NGC 6027b will eventually merge with its physical companions over the next several billion years to form a single giant elliptical galaxy.

== See also ==
- NGC 6027
- NGC 6027a
- NGC 6027c
- NGC 6027d
- NGC 6027e
- Seyfert's Sextet
