= Zwicky's Triplet =

Minor galaxy cluster in the constellation Hercules

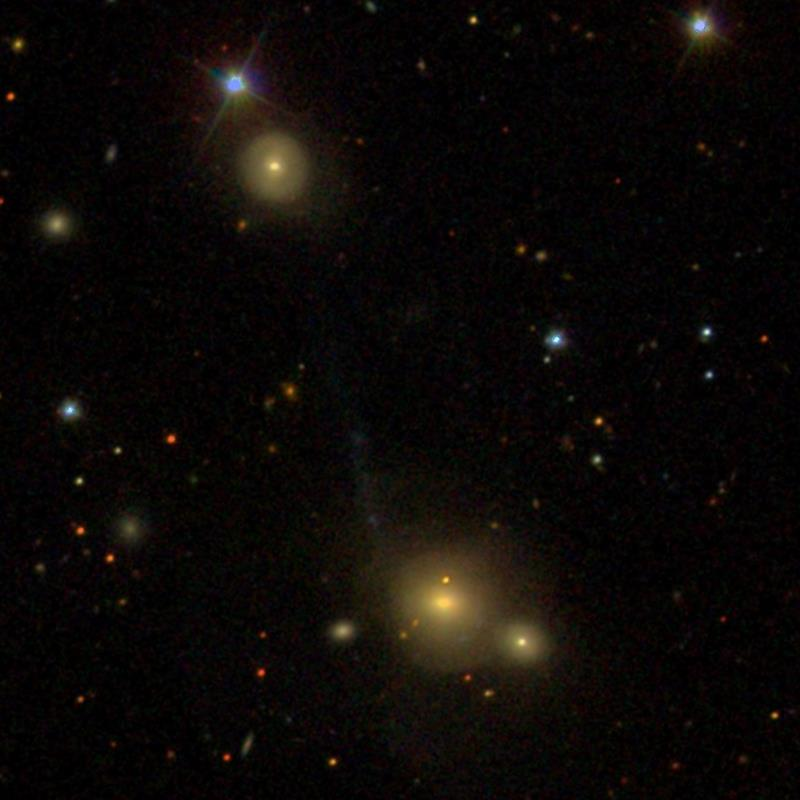
- Zwicky's triplet, imaged by the Sloan digital sky survey

Observation data (Epoch J2000)
- Constellation: Hercules
- Right ascension: 16^{h} 49^{m} 28.3^{s}
- Declination: +45° 27′ 40″
- Brightest member: PGC 59061
- Number of galaxies: 3
- Redshift: 0.03140
- Distance: 425 million ly

Other designations
- Arp 103, UGC 10586, VV 712, KPG 481

Zwicky's Triplet is an interacting system of three galaxies located approximately 425 million light-years (130 Mpc) away in the constellation Hercules. The system is named after astronomer Fritz Zwicky, who along with Milton L. Humason first detailed its structural anomalies and confirmed that the components are physically bound together by streams of intergalactic matter.

The triplet is morphologically divided into a tight, overlapping southern pair and a third member situated roughly 2.5 arcminutes to the north. The largest and brightest component is the southern unbarred lenticular galaxy PGC 59061 (UGC 10586B). Partially superimposed on the southwestern flank of PGC 59061 is PGC 59062 (UGC 10586A), a significantly smaller and fainter companion galaxy. Located to the north of this primary pair is PGC 59065, a lenticular galaxy that forms the final component of the system.

== Structural features and star formation ==
The defining characteristic of Arp 103 is a long, luminous, and narrow tidal bridge of stars and gas that extends continuously between the northern galaxy (PGC 59065) and the core southern galaxy (PGC 59061). The southern overlapping pair is also enshrouded by a broad, diffuse outer envelope of stars ejected during their close passage.

== Catalog classification ==
Halton Arp cataloged the system in 1966 within his Atlas of Peculiar Galaxies under the category "Elliptical and elliptical-like galaxies connected to spirals." While early historical observations notes described an "incomplete connection" due to the limitations of photographic plates at the time, modern deep spectroscopic and imaging datasets confirm the tidal plume is fully cohesive. Spectroscopic analysis shows that all three components share closely matching redshift profiles, confirming an active physical group rather than an optical line-of-sight alignment.

== NGC 6241 and 52 Herculis ==
Immediately southeast of Zwicky's Triplet is the location of galaxy NGC 6241. Half a degree north of Zwicky's Triplet, the double star 52 Herculis (magnitude + 4) could act as guidestar to try to find Zwicky's Triplet and NGC 6241.

== See also ==
- Wild's Triplet
- Robert's Quartet
- Stephan's Quintet
- NGC 7331 Group (also known as the Deer Lick Group, about half a degree northeast of Stephan's Quintet)
- Seyfert's Sextet
- Copeland's Septet
