= NGC 6027a =

Galaxy in the constellation Serpens

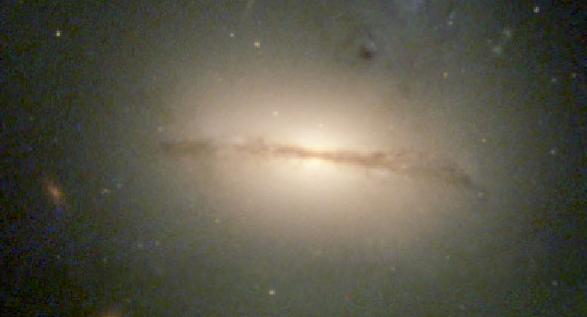
- A Hubble Space Telescope (HST) image of NGC 6027a.

Observation data (J2000 epoch)
- Constellation: Serpens
- Right ascension: 15^{h} 59^{m} 11.1^{s}
- Declination: +20° 45′ 16″
- Redshift: 4560 ± 8 km/s
- Apparent magnitude (V): 14.9

Characteristics
- Type: Sa pec
- Apparent size (V): 0.5′ × 0.4′

Other designations
- UGC 10116 NED02, PGC 56576

NGC 6027a is a spiral galaxy that is part of Seyfert's Sextet, a compact group of galaxies, which is located in the constellation Serpens. In optical wavelengths, it has a strong resemblance to Messier 104, the Sombrero Galaxy, with which it shares a near equivalent orientation to observers on Earth.

== See also ==
- NGC 6027
- NGC 6027b
- NGC 6027c
- NGC 6027d
- NGC 6027e
- Seyfert's Sextet
