= NGC 7363 =

Galaxy in the constellation Pegasus

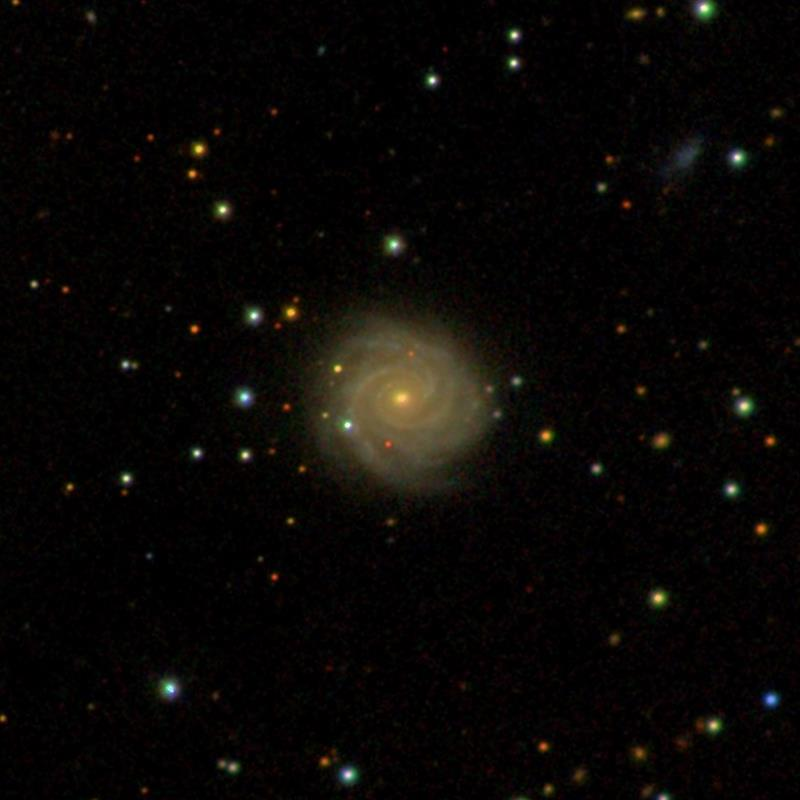
- The barred spiral galaxy NGC 7363

Observation data (J2000 epoch)
- Constellation: Pegasus
- Right ascension: 22^{h} 43^{m} 19.9401^{s}
- Declination: +34° 00′ 05.522″
- Redshift: 0.022419
- Heliocentric radial velocity: 6721 ± 6 km/s
- Distance: 307.5 ± 21.6 Mly (94.29 ± 6.61 Mpc)
- Group or cluster: NGC 7331 Group (LGG 459)
- Apparent magnitude (V): 13.8

Characteristics
- Type: SAB(s)d?
- Size: ~23,700 ly (7.28 kpc) (estimated)
- Apparent size (V): 1.1′ × 0.9′

Other designations
- IRAS 22409+3344, 2MASX J22431991+3400052, MCG +06-49-078, PGC 69580, CGCG 514-102

NGC 7363 is a barred spiral galaxy in the constellation of Pegasus. Its velocity with respect to the cosmic microwave background is 6393 ± 24 km/s, which corresponds to a Hubble distance of 94.29 ± 6.61 Mpc (~308 million light-years). It was discovered by German astronomer Heinrich d'Arrest on 27 August 1865.

== NGC 7331 Group ==
According to A. M. Garcia, NGC 7363 is part of the five member NGC 7331 group (also known as LGG 459). The other galaxies in the group are: NGC 7320, NGC 7331, UGC 12082, and UGC 12060.

== Supernova ==
One supernova has been observed in NGC 7363.

- SN 2023abdq (Type II, mag. 18.69) was discovered by the Gaia Photometric Science Alerts on 22 December 2023.

== See also ==
- List of NGC objects (7001–7840)
