= NGC 89 =

Galaxy in the constellation Phoenix

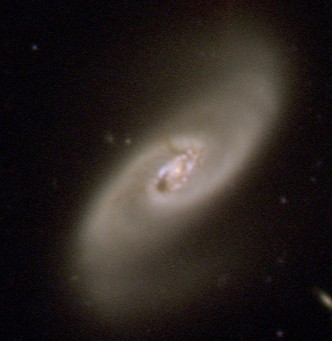
- NGC 89 (bottom) surrounded by the other galaxies in Robert's Quartet

Observation data (J2000 epoch)
- Constellation: Phoenix
- Right ascension: 00^{h} 21^{m} 24.355^{s}
- Declination: −48° 39′ 55.28″
- Redshift: 0.011074 ± 0.000067
- Distance: 144 ± 10 Mly (44.1 ± 3.1 Mpc)
- Apparent magnitude (V): 14.18

Characteristics
- Type: SB0/a pec
- Apparent size (V): 0′.957 × 0′.459

Other designations
- PGC 1374, ESO 194-G011

NGC 89 is an unbarred spiral galaxy located approximately 150 million light-years away in the southern constellation of Phoenix. It was discovered on September 30, 1834, by the English astronomer John Herschel.

== Physical characteristics ==
NGC 87 is classified morphologically as a barred or intermediate spiral galaxy with peculiar features induced by tidal perturbation. At its distance of 150 million light-years, its angular diameter corresponds to a physical size of roughly 50,000 light-years across.

The galaxy features an active galactic nucleus (AGN) classified as a Seyfert 2 nucleus. High-resolution imaging reveals a prominent dust lane crossing the central region and asymmetric spiral arms displaying star-forming regions triggered by interaction with its neighbors.

== Group membership ==
NGC 89 is a member of Robert's Quartet, a compact galaxy group located in Phoenix that also includes NGC 87, NGC 88, and NGC 92. The four member galaxies reside within a region spanning roughly 150,000 light-years across and exhibit active gravitational interactions.

== See also ==
- Robert's Quartet
- NGC 87
- NGC 88
- NGC 92
