= Wild's Triplet =

Visual grouping of three spiral galaxies

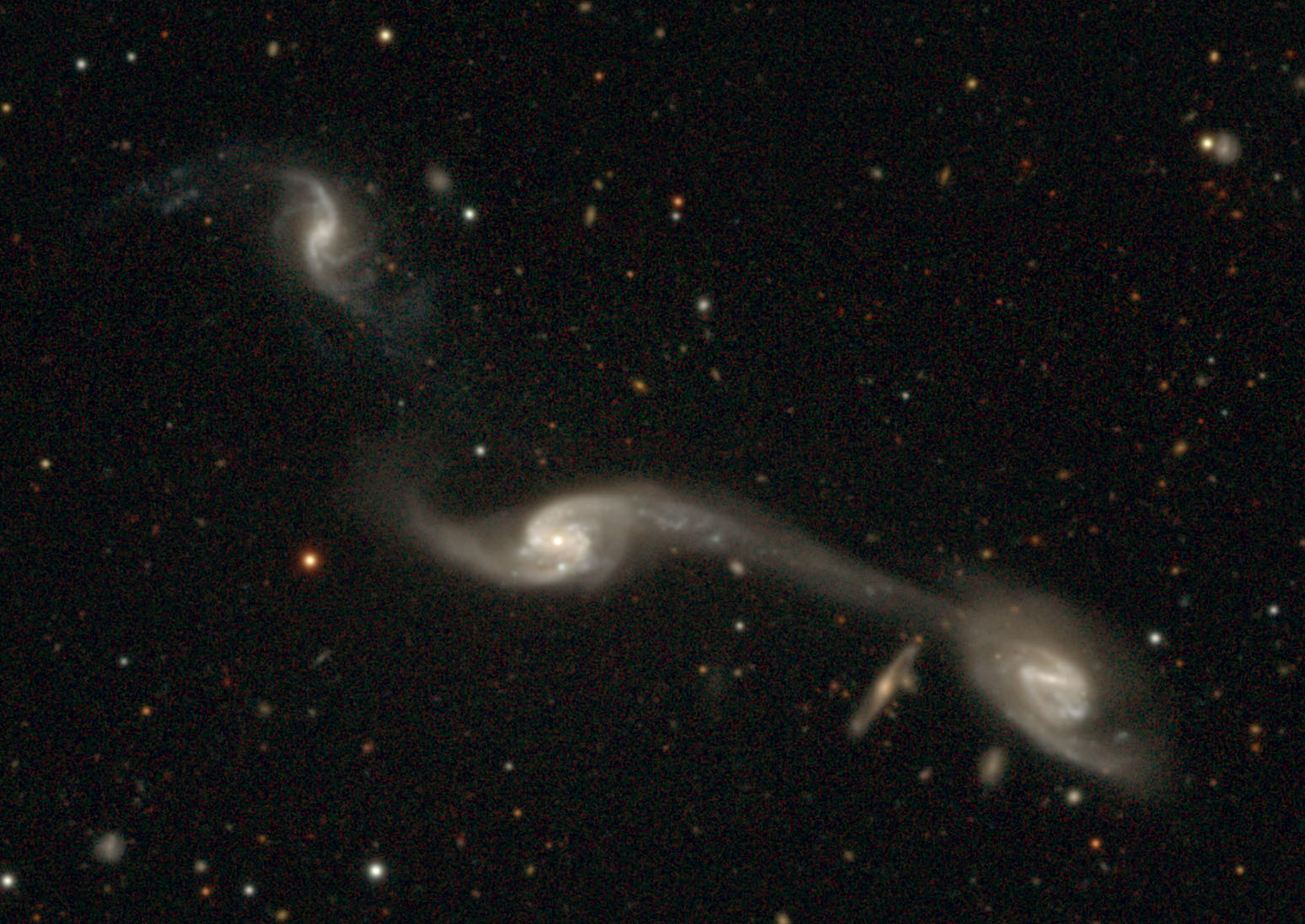
- Wild's Triplet with legacy surveys

Observation data (Epoch J2000)
- Constellation: Virgo
- Right ascension: 11^{h} 47^{m} 45.2^{s}
- Declination: -03° 50′ 53″
- Number of galaxies: 3
- Redshift: 0.01501 (PGC 36733; eastern member) 0.01724 (PGC 36723; western member) 0.01655 (PGC 36742; northern companion)
- Distance: 200–245 million ly

Other designations
- Arp 248, VV 851

Wild's Triplet (cataloged as Arp 248 and VV 851) is a visual grouping of three spiral galaxies located approximately 200 million light-years (~61 Mpc) away in the constellation Virgo. The group consists of a physically interacting foreground pair—the eastern/central spiral PGC 36733 and the western spiral PGC 36723—alongside a third, more distant northern companion galaxy cataloged as PGC 36742.

The defining structural feature of Arp 248 is an intergalactic tidal bridge that stretches across space to link the two foreground galaxies. This cosmic structure is an elongated stream composed of stars, gas, and interstellar dust pulled out of the outer stellar disks due to mutual gravitational tidal forces during a close encounter. These regions of displaced gas actively host new star formation, visibly highlighted by bright blue star clusters within the tail.

== Dynamical context ==
Halton Arp originally included the system in his 1966 Atlas of Peculiar Galaxies under the category "Appearance of Fission." While historically studied as a true three-galaxy merger event, modern redshift and spatial data indicate that the system's dynamics are more accurately described as a dual merger with an unlinked optical companion. The northern companion (PGC 36742) sits at a different line-of-sight distance and does not participate in the core physical collision shaping the main system.

The active, intense infrared signatures detected in the interacting nuclei of PGC 36733 and PGC 36723 indicate interstellar dust heating caused by strong starburst activity triggered by their ongoing interaction.

A small, edge-on spiral galaxy appears visually situated directly between the two interacting foreground galaxies in high-resolution imaging, but redshift surveys confirm it is an unrelated background object positioned billions of light-years further along the line of sight.

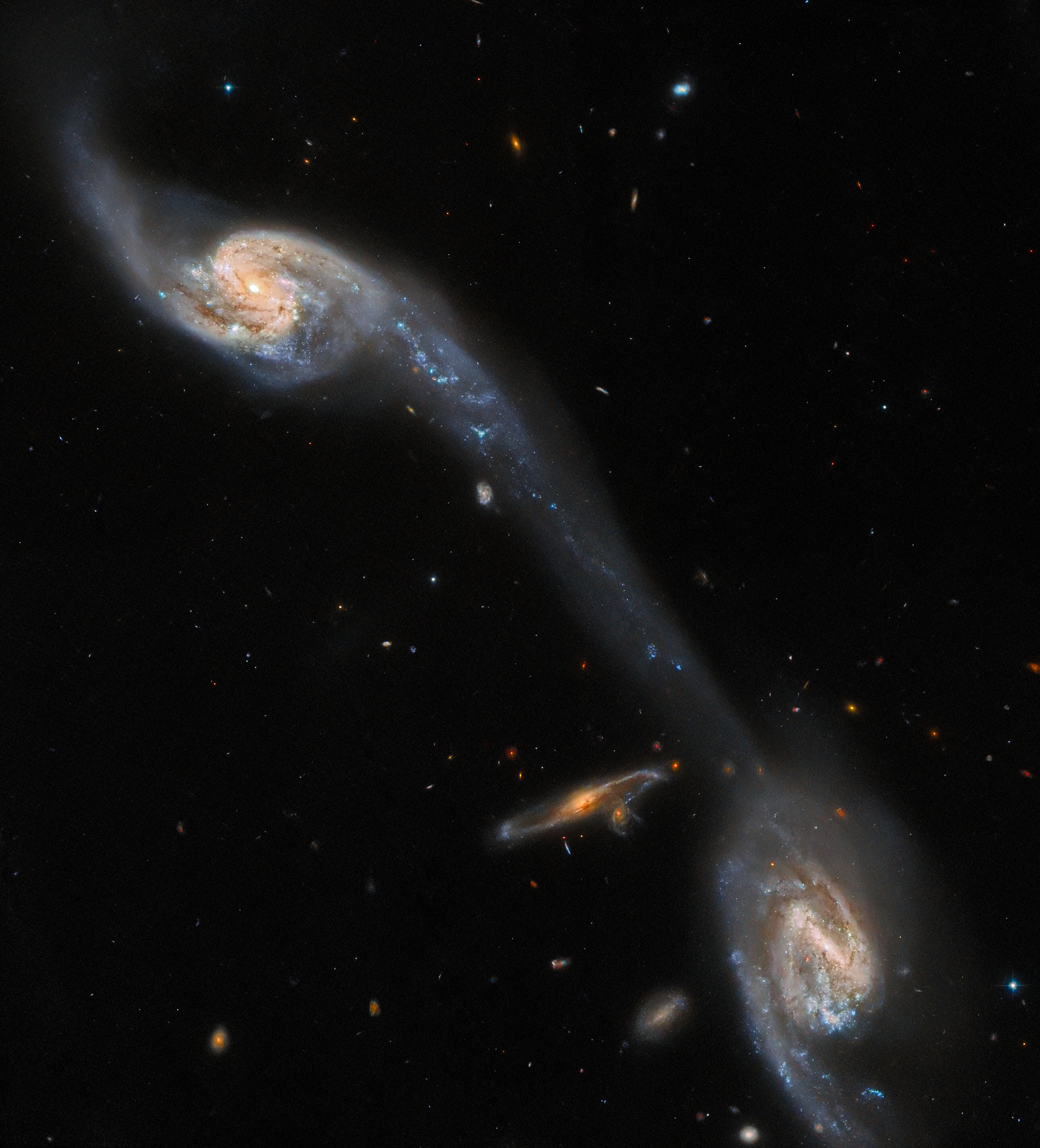
Part of Wild's Triplet with Hubble

== See also ==
- Zwicky's Triplet
- Robert's Quartet
- Stephan's Quintet
- NGC 7331 Group (also known as the Deer Lick Group, about half a degree northeast of Stephan's Quintet)
- Seyfert's Sextet
- Copeland's Septet
