= NGC 6027d =

Galaxy in the constellation Serpens

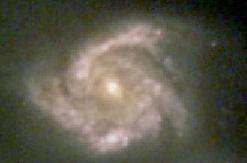
- NGC 6027d imaged by the Hubble Space Telescope

Observation data (J2000 epoch)
- Constellation: Serpens
- Right ascension: 15^{h} 59^{m} 12.9156^{s}
- Declination: +20° 45′ 35.535″
- Redshift: 0.066089
- Heliocentric radial velocity: 19813 ± 35 km/s
- Distance: 957.5 ± 67.1 Mly (293.58 ± 20.56 Mpc)
- Apparent magnitude (V): 16.5

Characteristics
- Type: SB(s)bc
- Size: ~181,600 ly (55.68 kpc) (estimated)
- Apparent size (V): 0′.2 × 0′.2

Other designations
- UGC 10116 NED05, MCG +04-38-009, PGC 56580, CGCG 137-010 NED05, VV 115d

NGC 6027d is a face-on barred spiral galaxy located approximately 877 million light-years (269 Mpc) away in the constellation Serpens. Although it appears visually within Seyfert's Sextet (HCG 79), high-resolution spectroscopy demonstrates that NGC 6027d is an unassociated background galaxy located nearly five times further away than the core interacting group. The galaxy has an apparent visual magnitude of 16.5.

== Physical Characteristics ==
NGC 6027d exhibits a recessional velocity of approximately 19,813 km/s, significantly higher than the 4,350 km/s mean velocity of the interacting cluster core. Because it lies in the far background along the same line of sight, NGC 6027d does not experience gravitational interactions or tidal disruptions from the members of Seyfert's Sextet.

== Supernovae ==
One supernova has been recorded in NGC 6027d. Supernova SN 1998fe was detected on July 19, 1998, by the Lick Observatory Supernova Search. Its type is unknown, and it reached a peak visual magnitude of 18.

== See also ==
- NGC 6027
- NGC 6027a
- NGC 6027b
- NGC 6027c
- NGC 6027e
- List of NGC objects (6001–7000)
