= NGC 6027e =

Tidal tail of NGC 6027 in the constellation Serpens

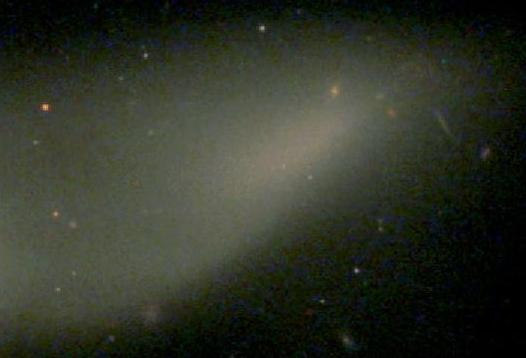
- A Hubble Space Telescope (HST) image of NGC 6027e.

Observation data (J2000 epoch)
- Constellation: Serpens
- Right ascension: 15^{h} 59^{m} 14.5^{s}
- Declination: +20° 45′ 57″
- Redshift: 4095 ± 41 km/s
- Distance: 190 million ly (58 Mpc)
- Apparent magnitude (V): 16.7

Characteristics
- Type: SB:0?
- Apparent size (V): 0.8′ × 0.4′

Other designations
- UGC 10116 NED06, PGC 56579

NGC 6027e is a tidal tail located approximately 190 million light-years (58 Mpc) away in the constellation Serpens. Although originally cataloged as a distinct member galaxy of Seyfert's Sextet (HCG 79), high-resolution imaging by the Hubble Space Telescope confirmed that NGC 6027e is not an independent galaxy, but rather an extended plume of stars and gas ejected into intergalactic space by gravitational interactions. The feature has an apparent visual magnitude of 16.7.

== Formation and Structure ==
NGC 6027e formed as strong tidal gravitational forces from nearby group members stripped stellar material from the primary lenticular galaxy NGC 6027. The feature extends roughly 35,000 light-years across the cluster field, consisting of stars and neutral hydrogen gas pulled from the disk of its host galaxy.

== See also ==
- NGC 6027
- NGC 6027a
- NGC 6027b
- NGC 6027c
- NGC 6027d
