= Dyer Observatory =

Vanderbilt University observatory in Brentwood, Tennessee

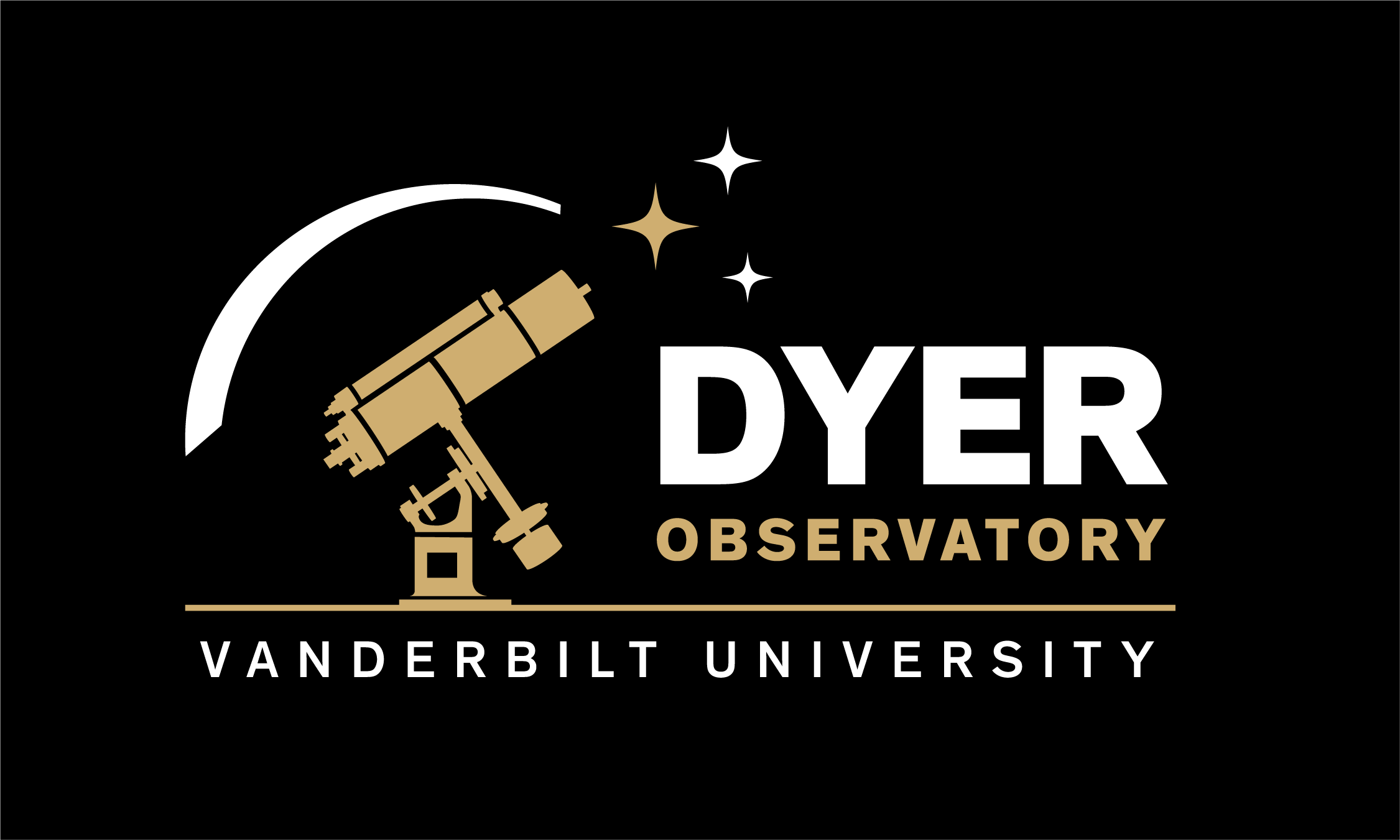
- Dyer Observatory logo
- Alternative names: Arthur J. Dyer Observatory
- Organization: Vanderbilt University
- Observatory code: 759
- Location: Nashville, Tennessee
- Coordinates: 36°03′08″N 86°48′18″W
- Altitude: 345 metres (1,132 ft)
- Established: 1953
- Website: Dyer Observatory

Telescopes
- Seyfert: 24-inch reflector
- Arthur J. Dyer Observatory
- U.S. National Register of Historic Places
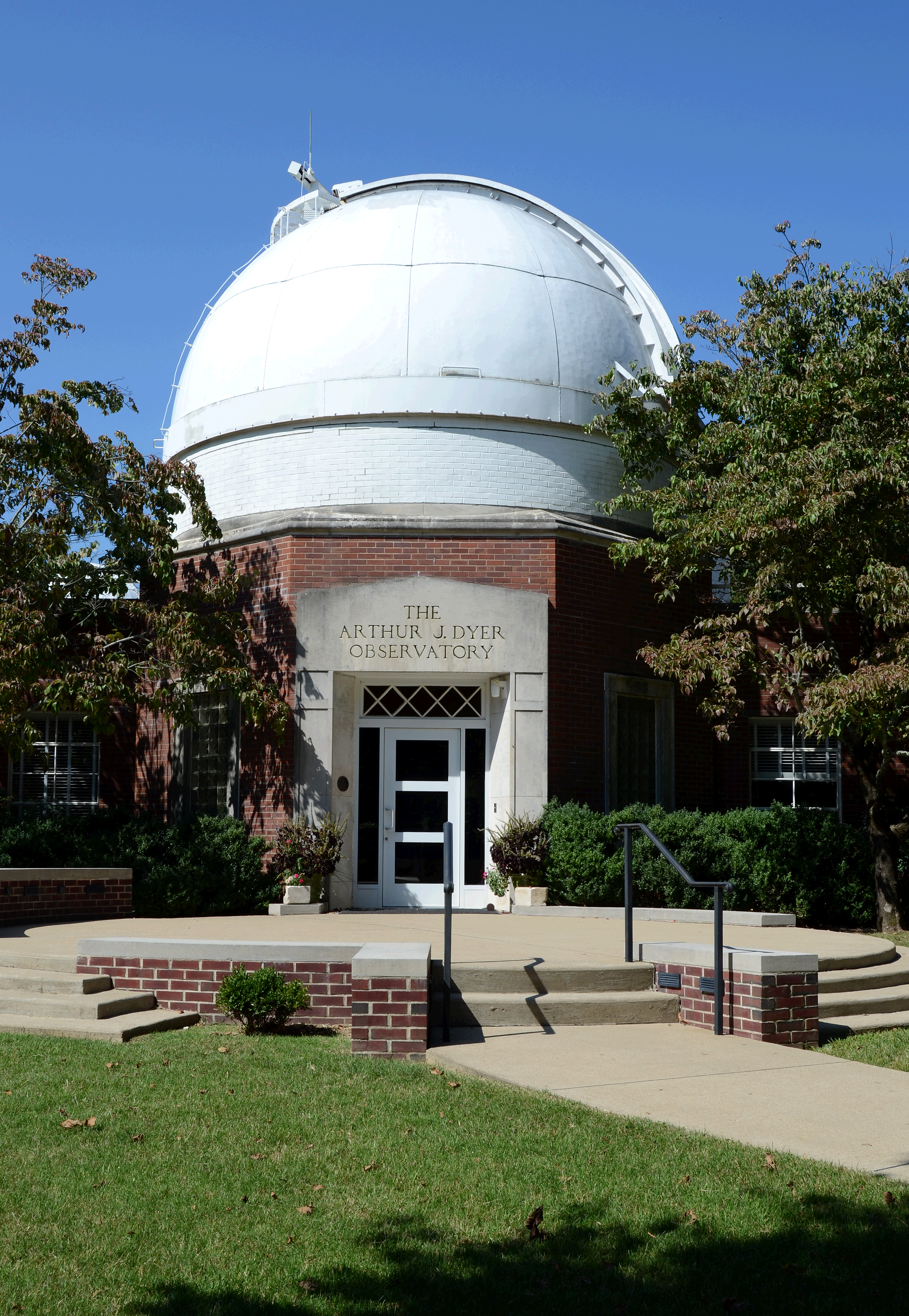

- Location within Tennessee
- Location: 1000 Oman Dr., Nashville, Tennessee
- Coordinates: 36°03′08″N 86°48′18″W
- Area: 9 acres (36,000 m^{2})
- Built: 1953
- NRHP reference No.: 09000114
- Added to NRHP: March 6, 2009

The Dyer Observatory, also known as the Arthur J. Dyer Observatory, is an astronomical observatory owned and operated by Vanderbilt University. Built in 1953, it is located in Nashville, Tennessee, and is the only university facility not located on the main campus in Nashville. The observatory is named after Arthur J. Dyer, who paid for the observatory's 24-foot (7.3 m)-wide dome, and houses a 24-inch (610 mm) reflecting telescope named for astronomer Carl Seyfert. Today, the observatory primarily serves as a teaching tool; its mission is to interest the public in the fields of astronomy, science and engineering. The observatory was listed on the National Register of Historic Places on March 6, 2009.

== History ==
Vanderbilt's first observatory was housed on the campus itself. It was equipped with a 6-inch (150 mm) refracting telescope and was the site of E. E. Barnard's earliest astronomical work. Barnard would eventually discover 16 comets and the fifth moon of Jupiter, receive the only honorary degree Vanderbilt has ever awarded, and have the on-campus observatory named in his honor. However, that on-campus observatory would eventually prove insufficient for the university's needs.

When Seyfert joined the university's faculty in 1946, he lobbied for increasing the astronomy department's modest course offerings and for a new observatory. He solicited donations from over 80 Nashville businesses to outfit the new observatory and convinced Dyer, owner of Nashville Bridge Company, to donate the funds for and to install the observatory's dome. When the observatory opened in December 1953, Seyfert was named its director, and, after his death, the 24-inch (610 mm) telescope was named in his honor.

The dome was originally painted aluminum, but this caused problems with observations before midnight while the telescope dome cooled. It was subsequently painted white in 1963, which significantly reduced the temperature of the dome and improved observations.

== See also ==
- List of astronomical observatories
