= Erik Holmberg =

Erik Holmberg may refer to:

- Erik Holmberg (footballer) (1922–1998), Norwegian football defender
- Erik Holmberg (singer) (born 1970), musician in the Swedish band Dive
- Erik Holmberg (astronomer) (1908–2000), Swedish astronomer and cosmologist

== See also ==
- Holmberg (disambiguation)
