= Seyfert's Sextet =

Group of galaxies in the constellation Serpens

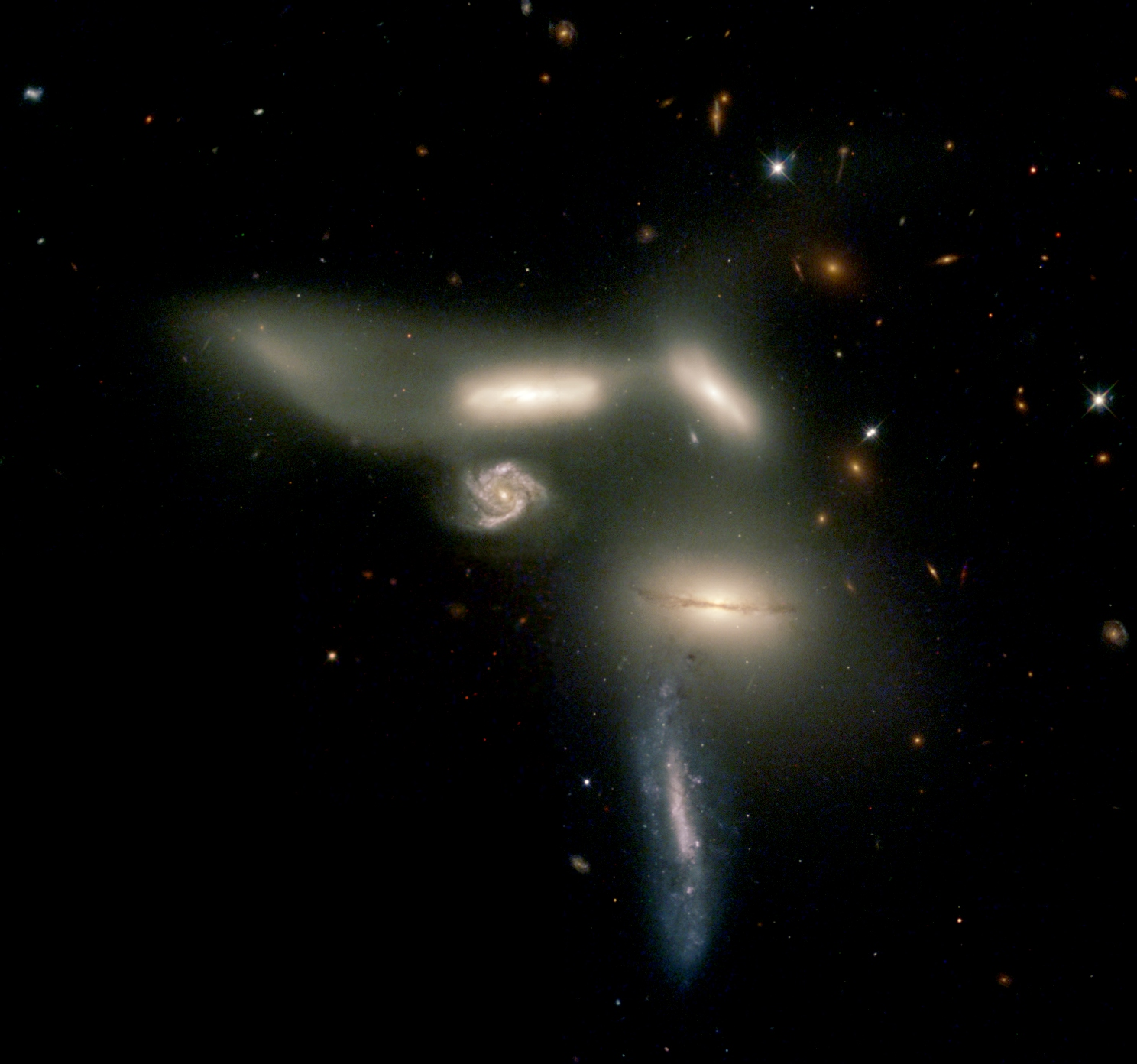
- A Hubble Space Telescope (HST) image of Seyfert's Sextet. All galaxies (left to right): NGC 6027e, NGC 6027, NGC 6027d (below NGC 6027), NGC 6027c (bottommost galaxy), NGC 6027a (Lenticular galaxy with a dust lane above NGC 6027c), NGC 6027b (above NGC 6027a). Credit: HST/NASA/ESA.

Observation data (Epoch J2000)
- Constellation: Serpens
- Right ascension: 15^{h} 59^{m} 11.9^{s}
- Declination: +20° 45′ 31″
- Brightest member: NGC 6027
- Number of galaxies: 6
- Redshift: Z = 0.0145
- Distance: 190 million ly

Other designations
- Serpens Sextet, HCG 79, UGC 10116, VV 115, VII Zw 631

Seyfert's Sextet is a compact group of galaxies located approximately 190 million light-years (58 Mpc) away in the constellation Serpens. The core interacting group spans approximately 35,000 light-years across, making the system smaller than the disk of the Milky Way. The members exhibit an average recessional velocity of 4,350 km/s. High-resolution imaging by the Hubble Space Telescope confirmed that the group consists of four physically interacting galaxies, one prominent tidal stream, and one background spiral galaxy positioned along the same line of sight.

== Member components ==
The six components associated with Seyfert's Sextet represent distinct physical structures. The core member is NGC 6027, a lenticular galaxy around which the other group members are distributed. Three spiral galaxies undergo strong gravitational interaction with the core: NGC 6027a exhibits tidal distortion from encounters with NGC 6027, NGC 6027b undergoes heavy tidal shear from surrounding members, and NGC 6027c displays warped structural features from close physical encounters within the group.

The remaining two designated catalogue components are not independent interacting galaxies. NGC 6027d is an unassociated background spiral galaxy located at a distance of approximately 877 million light-years (269 Mpc) with a recessional velocity of 19,815 km/s, appearing within the group purely due to line-of-sight alignment. NGC 6027e is a luminous tidal tail formed by a plume of stars and gas ejected from NGC 6027 during past interactions.

=== Gravitational Interactions and evolution ===
Gravitational interactions among the four physical members have stripped dust and neutral hydrogen gas from their disks into intergalactic space. Seyfert's Sextet shows a low rate of current starburst activity and lacks a population of young star clusters. N-body simulations indicate that the four interacting galaxies will continue to undergo orbital decay and eventually merge into a single giant elliptical galaxy.

== Discovery and history ==
French astronomer Édouard Stephan first observed the visual group on June 17, 1876, using a 31-inch Foucault reflector at the Marseille Observatory, cataloging the cluster under the single designation NGC 6027.

American astronomer Carl Seyfert identified the system as a compact grouping of six distinct optical components in 1948 using photographic plates taken at Vanderbilt University. Seyfert published the finding in 1951 in the Publications of the Astronomical Society of the Pacific, describing it as the most compact group of galaxies known at the time.

== See also ==
- Wild's Triplet
- Zwicky's Triplet
- Robert's Quartet
- Stephan's Quintet and NGC 7331 Group (also known as the Deer Lick Group); about half a degree northeast of Stephan's Quintet
- Copeland's Septet
