= Robert's Quartet =

Compact galaxy group in the constellation of Phoenix

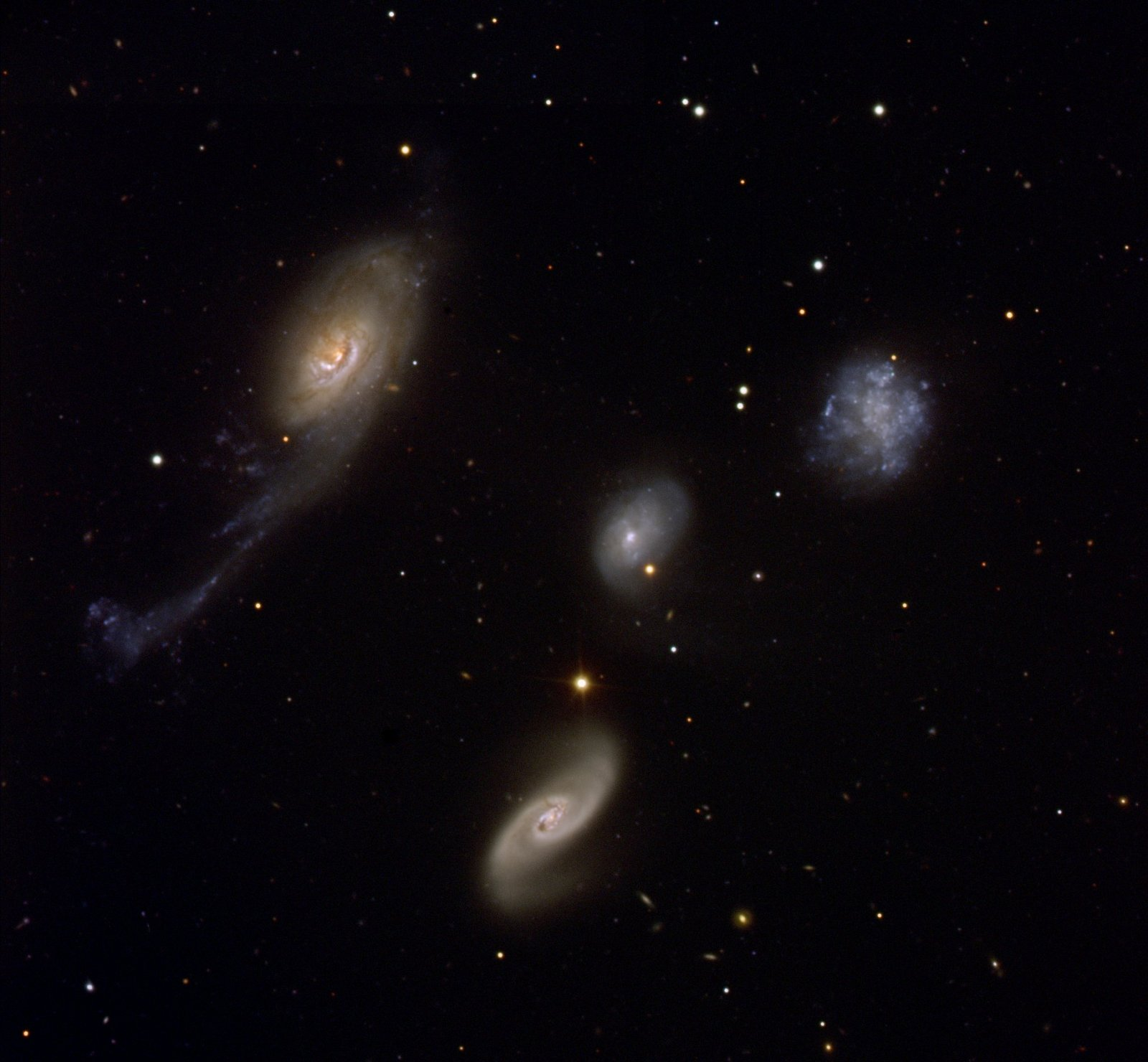
- Robert's Quartet, taken by the European Southern Observatory

Observation data (Epoch J2000)
- Constellation: Phoenix
- Right ascension: 0^{h} 21^{m} 23.075^{s}
- Declination: −48° 37.75′ 39.5″
- Brightest member: NGC 92
- Number of galaxies: 4
- Redshift: 0.01762
- Distance: 160 million ly

Other designations
- AM 0018-485, NGC 92 Group, Rose 34

Robert's Quartet is a compact interacting galaxy group located approximately 160 million light-years (49 Mpc) away in the southern constellation Phoenix. The four member galaxies occupy a radius of roughly 75,000 light-years. This makes the entire group smaller across than the disk of the Milky Way. The system has a combined visual magnitude of 13.0. Extreme physical proximity causes severe gravitational disruptions among the members, driving structural distortion and starting a starburst formation within the individual galaxies.

== Morphology and interactions ==
The system consists of four primary galaxies undergoing tidal disruption. NGC 87 is an irregular, gas-rich galaxy containing at least 56 distinct H II regions scattered across its disk. Adjacent to it sits NGC 88, a barred spiral galaxy encased in a diffuse outer gas envelope that has been stripped away by the gravitational pull of its neighbors.

NGC 89 operates as an active galaxy, powered by a Seyfert 2 active galactic nucleus. Classified as a barred spiral, it displays heavily distorted spiral arms. The largest component of the group is NGC 92, an unbarred spiral containing over 200 massive H II regions spanning 500–1,500 light-years in diameter. Gravitational shearing forces have drawn out a tail of dust and stars extending over 100,000 light-years away from NGC 92 into the surrounding intergalactic medium.

== Discovery and cataloging ==
English astronomer John Herschel discovered the four galaxies on September 30, 1834, during a southern sky survey conducted from the Cape of Good Hope. Astronomers Halton Arp and Barry F. Madore cataloged the system as AM 0018-485 in 1987 in A Catalogue of Southern Peculiar Galaxies and Associations. They named the group "Robert's Quartet" after Robert Freedman, the astronomer who calculated and updated the positional data for the catalog's peculiar galaxy systems.

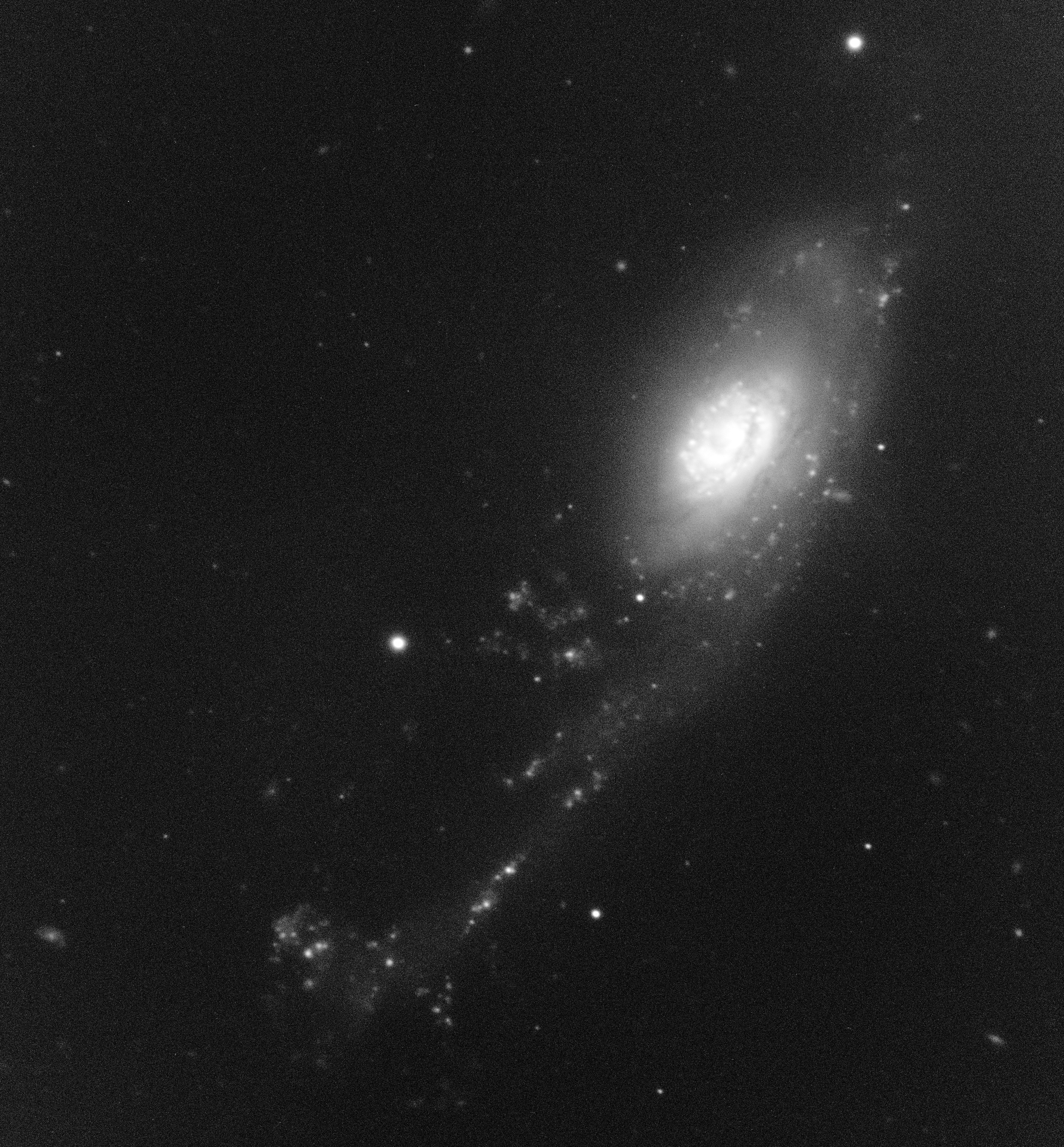
The largest member of the galaxy group known as Roberts Quartet is NGC 92, a spiral Sa galaxy with an unusual appearance.

== See also ==
- Wild's Triplet
- Zwicky's Triplet
- Grus Quartet
- Stephan's Quintet
- Seyfert's Sextet
- Copeland's Septet
