= NGC 88 =

Galaxy in the constellation Phoenix

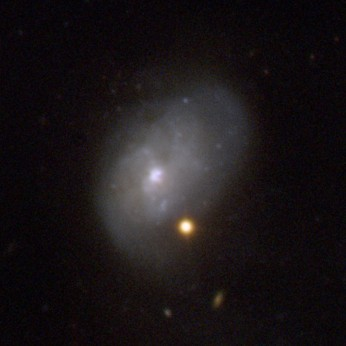
- NGC 88 (center) surrounded by the other galaxies in Robert's Quartet

Observation data (J2000 epoch)
- Constellation: Phoenix
- Right ascension: 00^{h} 21^{m} 21.8^{s}
- Declination: −48° 38′ 25″
- Redshift: 0.011408
- Distance: 160 Mly
- Apparent magnitude (V): 14.1

Characteristics
- Type: SB(s)a pec
- Apparent size (V): 0.8′ × 0.5′

Other designations
- PGC 1370, ESO 194-G010

NGC 88 is an interacting peculiar spiral galaxy located approximately 160 million light-years (49 Mpc) away in the constellation Phoenix. It is a physical member of Robert's Quartet (HCG 92), a compact group of four interacting galaxies. The galaxy has an apparent visual magnitude of 14.1.

== Physical Characteristics and Environment ==
NGC 88 features a faint, diffuse outer envelope of gas and dust that has been tidally extended due to ongoing gravitational interactions with its neighboring group members, particularly NGC 87 and NGC 89. High-resolution imaging obtained by the Very Large Telescope demonstrates that these interactions have induced mild star-forming regions within its distorted spiral arms. The galaxy has an apparent angular size of 0′.8 × 0′.5 arcminutes, which at its light-travel distance of 160 million light-years translates to a physical diameter of approximately 35,000 light-years.

== Discovery ==
NGC 88 was discovered by English astronomer John Herschel on September 30, 1834, using an 18.7-inch reflecting telescope at the Cape of Good Hope.
