= NGC 6027 =

Galaxy in the constellation Serpens

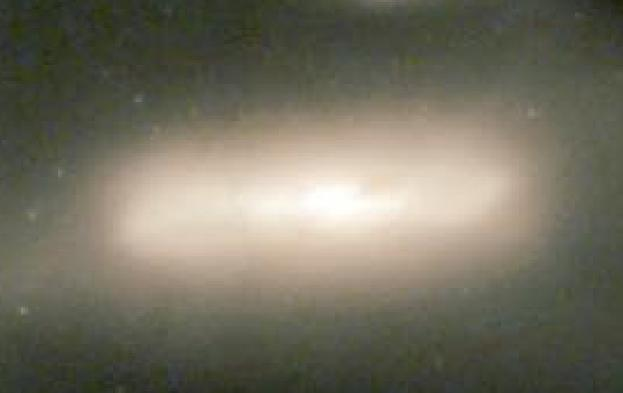
- NGC 6027 imaged by the Hubble Space Telescope

Observation data (J2000 epoch)
- Constellation: Serpens
- Right ascension: 15^{h} 59^{m} 12.5^{s}
- Declination: +20° 45′ 48″
- Redshift: 4447 ± 11 km/s
- Distance: ~190 Mly
- Apparent magnitude (V): 14.7

Characteristics
- Type: S0 pec.
- Apparent size (V): 0′.4 × 0′.2

Other designations
- UGC 10116 NED01, MCG +04-38-008, PGC 56575, CGCG 137-010 NED01

NGC 6027 is an interacting peculiar lenticular galaxy (type S0 pec) located approximately 190 million light-years (58 Mpc) away in the constellation Serpens. It is the primary and brightest galaxy member of Seyfert's Sextet (HCG 79), a compact interacting group of galaxies. The galaxy has an apparent visual magnitude of 14.7.

== Physical Characteristics and Environment ==
NGC 6027 acts as the central gravitational anchor of Seyfert's Sextet, surrounded closely by NGC 6027a, NGC 6027b, and NGC 6027c. Ongoing gravitational tidal forces between NGC 6027 and its neighboring spiral companions have ejected a tidal tail of stars and interstellar gas into intergalactic space, cataloged separately as NGC 6027e.

High-resolution imaging obtained by the Hubble Space Telescope reveals that while tidal collisions have distorted the galaxy, star formation within NGC 6027 remains relatively low compared to other compact interacting systems. Dynamical modeling indicates that the core members of the group, including NGC 6027, will undergo orbital decay and eventually merge into a single giant elliptical galaxy.

== Discovery ==
French astronomer Édouard Stephan discovered NGC 6027 on March 20, 1882, using an 80 cm (31.5 in) Foucault reflecting telescope at the Marseille Observatory.

== See also ==
- NGC 6027a
- NGC 6027b
- NGC 6027c
- NGC 6027d
- NGC 6027e
- Seyfert's Sextet
- List of NGC objects (6001–7000)
