= NGC 7320 =

Galaxy in the constellation Pegasus

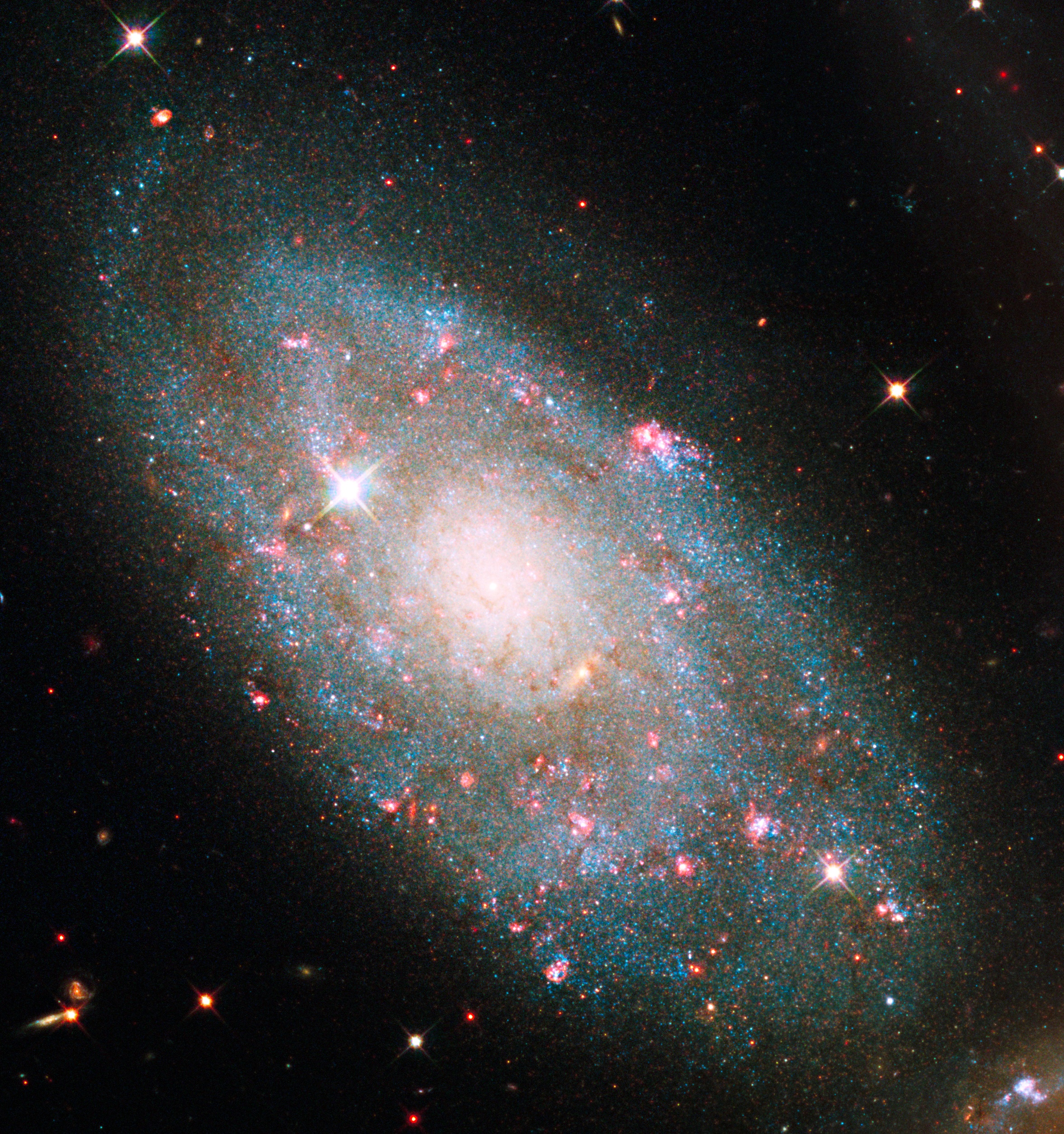
- NGC 7320 imaged by the Hubble Space Telescope

Observation data (J2000.0 epoch)
- Constellation: Pegasus
- Right ascension: 22^{h} 36^{m} 03.4^{s}
- Declination: +33° 56′ 53″
- Redshift: 786 ± 20 km/s
- Distance: 39 million ly (12 Mpc)
- Apparent magnitude (V): +13.2
- Apparent magnitude (B): 13.8
- Absolute magnitude (V): −17.8
- Absolute magnitude (B): −16.6
- magnitude (J): 11.2
- magnitude (H): 9.8
- magnitude (K): 9.5

Characteristics
- Type: SA(s)d
- Size: 9.56 kiloparsecs (31,170 light-years) (diameter; 25.0 mag/arcsec^{2} B-band isophote)
- Apparent size (V): 2.2′ × 1.2′
- Notable features: Foreground projection on Stephan's Quintet

Other designations
- UGC 12101, PGC 69270, Arp 319, HCG 092A

NGC 7320 is an unbarred spiral galaxy located approximately 39 million light-years away in the constellation Pegasus. It was discovered on 27 September 1873 by the French astronomer Édouard Stephan.

While visually grouped as the brightest apparent member of Stephan's Quintet (Hickson Compact Group 92), NGC 7320 is not gravitationally associated with the core interacting cluster. It is instead a foreground projection positioned along the same line of sight from Earth, lying at roughly one-seventh the distance of the background group.

== Observational history ==
Historically, the spatial location of NGC 7320 was a central point of contention in the mid-20th century cosmic distance scale debate. Spectroscopic observations obtained by Geoffrey and Margaret Burbidge in 1961 revealed a discordant heliocentric redshift of 786 km/s for NGC 7320, contrasted against the ~6,600 km/s velocities of the surrounding members. Anomalous redshift proponents argued this indicated physical proximity with non-cosmological redshift factors. However, high-resolution imaging from the Hubble Space Telescope successfully resolved individual population I stars and localized interstellar dust within NGC 7320—confirming its proximity as a foreground silhouette.

== Group membership ==
Based on its distance and spatial velocity, NGC 7320 is classified as a physical member of the nearby NGC 7331 Group (Deer Lick Group), centered around the isolated unbarred spiral galaxy NGC 7331.

== Physical characteristics ==
NGC 7320 is classified morphologically as an SA(s)d intermediate-to-late type spiral galaxy under the De Vaucouleurs profile. Unlike the structurally stripped background members of Hickson 92, NGC 7320 maintains an unperturbed interstellar medium. High-resolution infrared imaging from the James Webb Space Telescope's Mid-Infrared Instrument (MIRI) demonstrates extensive, active H II regions embedded along its outer spiral filaments, tracing massive ongoing stellar assembly cycles driven by its native cold gas reservoirs.

== Image gallery ==
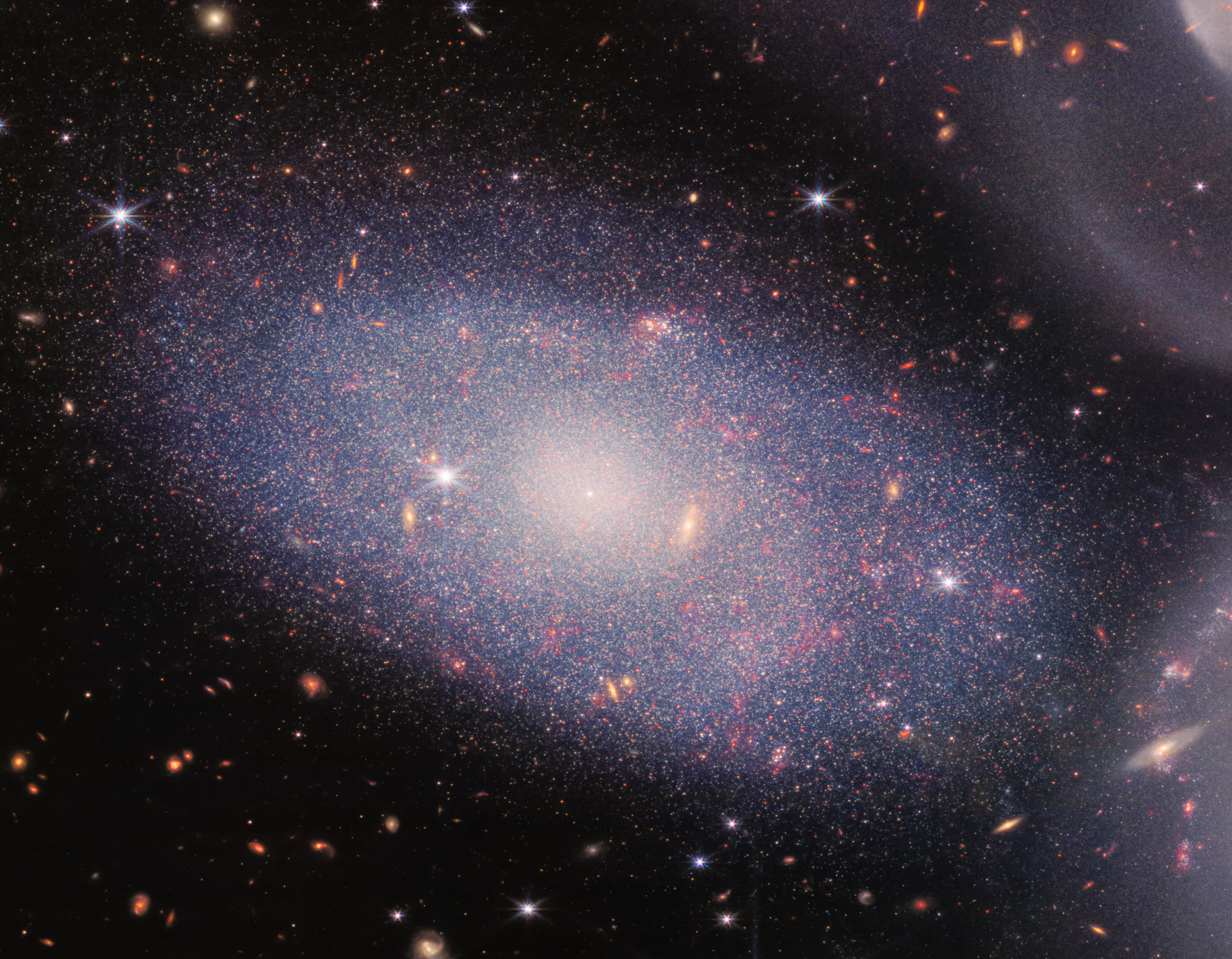
NGC 7320 imaged by the James Webb Space Telescope.

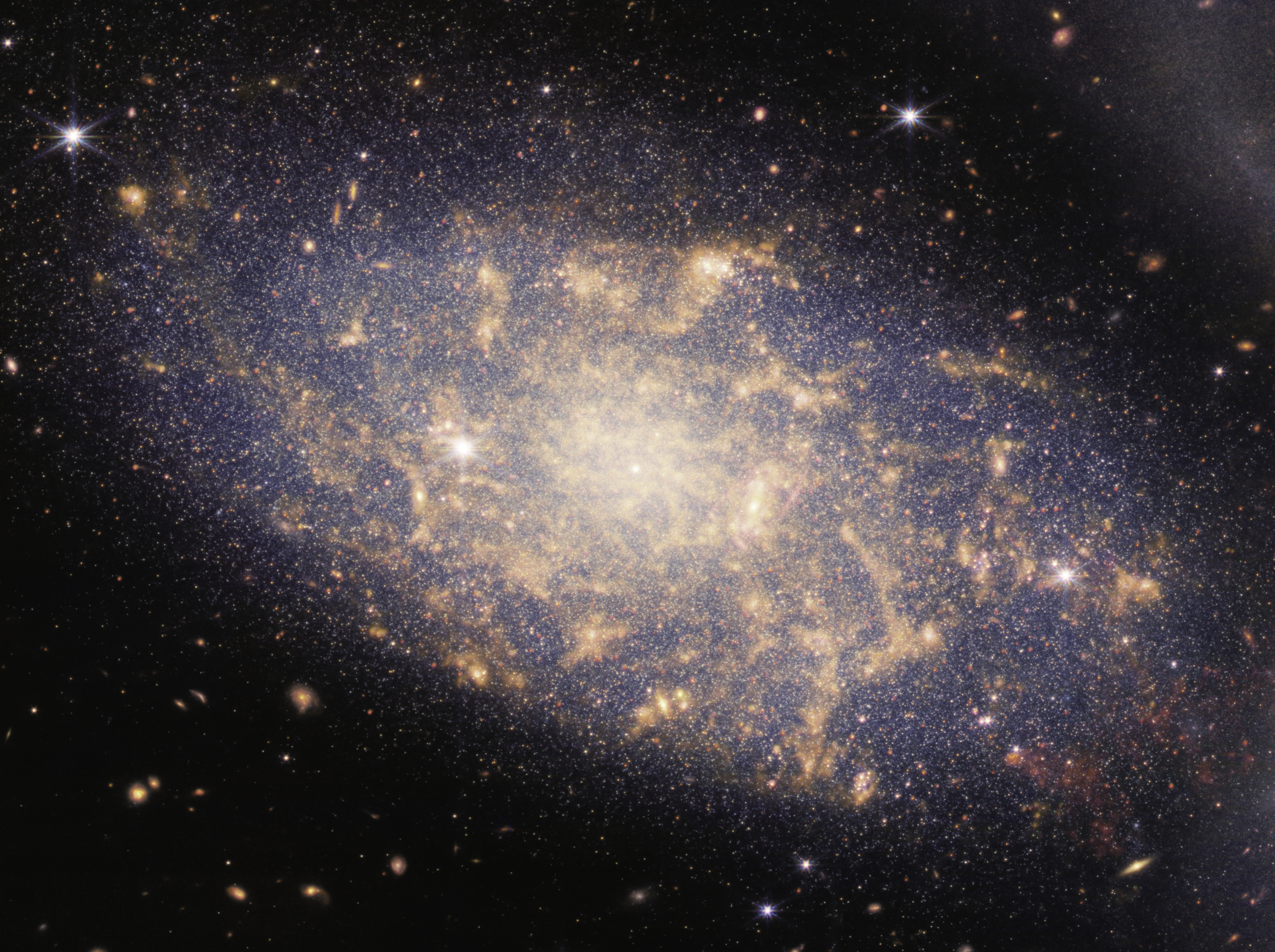
NGC 7320, taken by the James Webb Space Telescope

== See also ==
- List of NGC objects (7001–7840)
