= SN 2023rve =

Supernova event inside the galaxy NGC 1097 in the constellation Fornax

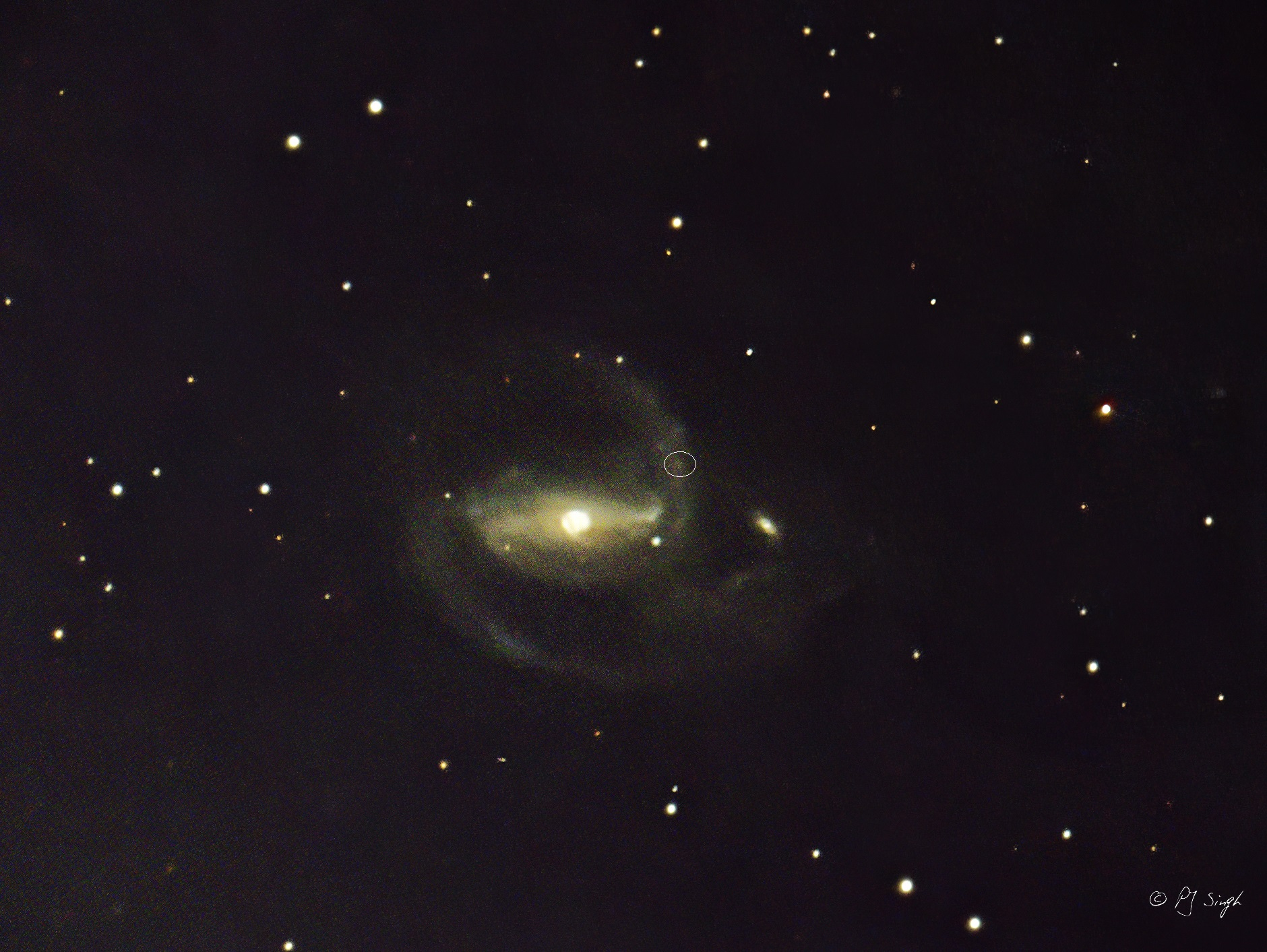
- SN 2023rve on 19 January 2024
- Event type: Supernova
- Type II
- Date: detected 8 September 2023 by Mohammad Odeh
- Constellation: Fornax
- Right ascension: 02^{h} 46^{m}18.13^{s}
- Declination: -30° 14' 22.2"
- Epoch: J2000.0
- Distance: ~45 million ly
- Host: NGC 1097
- Peak apparent magnitude: +13.9

SN 2023rve is a Type II supernova that happened in the 10th magnitude barred spiral galaxy NGC 1097. It was discovered on 8 September 2023 by Mohammad Odeh in the United Arab Emirates, using Al-Khatim Observatory (M44) maintained by the International Astronomical Center (IAC). Scientists from the McDonald Observatory Texas, United States, have observed the supernova and conducted photometric measurements, they described it to be the brightest supernova in the sky as of 12 September 2023.

A dedicated page for this supernova was created on the "Bright Supernovae" website, which contains several images and light curves for this supernova.

It was added to the International Variable Star Index (VSX), maintained by the American Association of Variable Star Observers (AAVSO).

== See also ==
- SN 1992bd
- SN 1999eu
- SN 2006X
- NGC 1097
