= NGC 7300 =

Galaxy in the constellation Aquarius

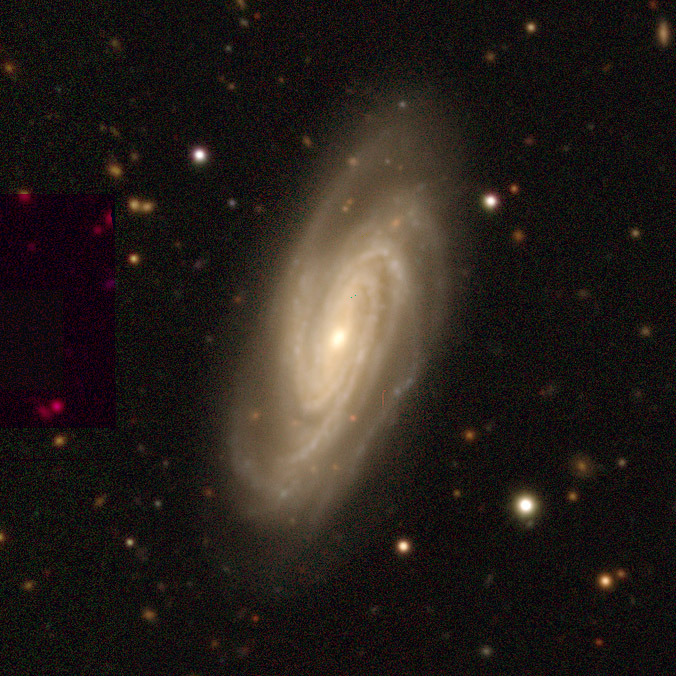
- NGC 7300 imaged by Legacy Surveys

Observation data (J2000 epoch)
- Constellation: Aquarius
- Right ascension: 22^{h} 30^{m} 59.9137^{s}
- Declination: −14° 00′ 12.631″
- Redshift: 0.016368±0.0000140
- Heliocentric radial velocity: 4,907±4 km/s
- Distance: 181.89 ± 10.31 Mly (55.767 ± 3.162 Mpc)
- Group or cluster: NGC 7300 group (LGG 458)
- Apparent magnitude (V): 13.6
- Magnitude (J): 10.507
- Magnitude (H): 9.815
- Magnitude (K): 9.561

Characteristics
- Type: SAB(rs)b
- Size: ~118,100 ly (36.20 kpc) (estimated)
- Apparent size (V): 2.0′ × 1.0′

Other designations
- IRAS F22283-1415, 2MASS J22305979-1400103, IC 5204, MCG -02-57-011, PGC 69040

NGC 7300 is an intermediate spiral galaxy in the constellation of Aquarius. Its velocity with respect to the cosmic microwave background is 4,566±24 km/s, which corresponds to a Hubble distance of 219.7 ± 15.4 Mly (67.35 ± 4.73 Mpc). However, 15 non-redshift measurements give a closer mean distance of 181.89 ± 10.31 Mly (55.767 ± 3.162 Mpc). It was discovered by British astronomer John Herschel on 26 July 1830.

== NGC 7300 group ==
NGC 7300 is the namesake of a small group of galaxies. The other galaxies in the NGC 7300 group (also known as LGG 458) are NGC 7251, NGC 7298, MCG -03-57-001, and MCG -03-57-008.

== Supernovae ==
Two supernovae have been observed in NGC 7300:

- SN 1996ca (Type Ia, mag. 16.5) was discovered by Masakatsu Aoki on 15 December 1996.
- SN 2015au (Type IIb, mag. 17.7) was discovered by Greg Bock as part of the Backyard Observatory Supernova Search (BOSS) on 10 November 2015.

== See also ==
- List of NGC objects (7001–7840)
