= NGC 1578 =

Galaxy in the constellation Dorado

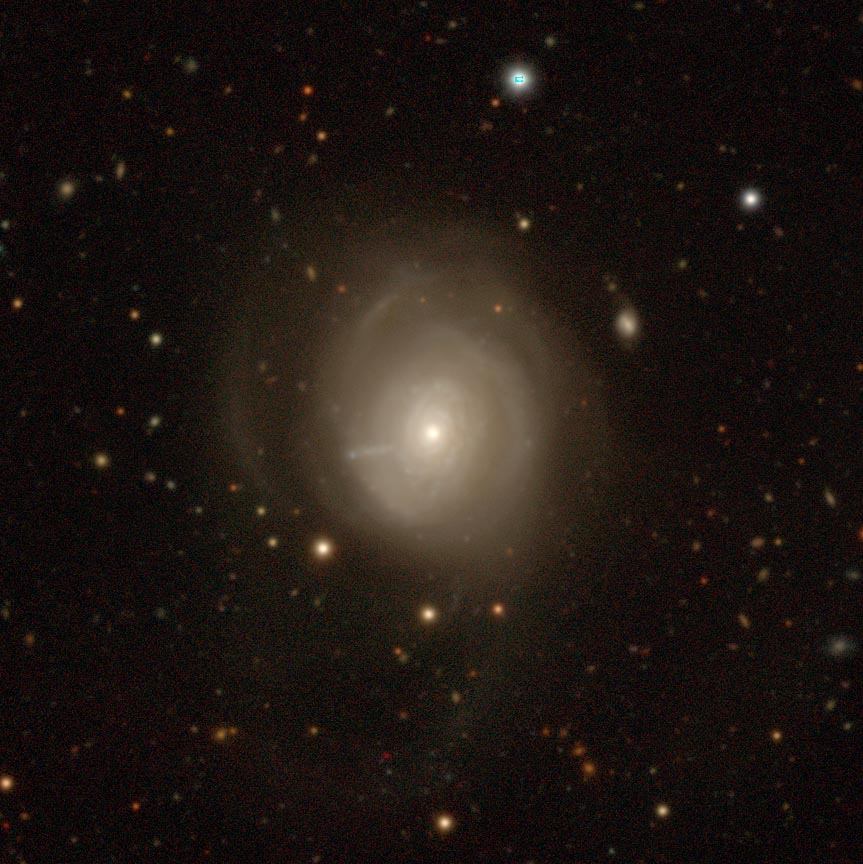
- NGC 1578 imaged by Legacy Surveys

Observation data (J2000 epoch)
- Constellation: Dorado
- Right ascension: 04^{h} 23^{m} 46.6184^{s}
- Declination: −51° 35′ 58.022″
- Redshift: 0.020608±0.0000870
- Heliocentric radial velocity: 6,178±26 km/s
- Distance: 296.6 ± 20.8 Mly (90.94 ± 6.39 Mpc)
- Apparent magnitude (V): 13.92

Characteristics
- Type: SA(s)a pec
- Size: ~174,800 ly (53.58 kpc) (estimated)
- Apparent size (V): 1.2′ × 1.1′

Other designations
- ESO 202- G 014, FAIRALL 771, IRAS 04224-5142, PGC 015025

NGC 1578 is a spiral galaxy in the constellation of Dorado. Its velocity with respect to the cosmic microwave background is 6,166±26 km/s, which corresponds to a Hubble distance of 296.6 ± 20.8 Mly (90.94 ± 6.39 Mpc). It was discovered by British astronomer John Herschel on 27 December 1834.

NGC 1578 is an active galactic nucleus candidate, i.e. it has a compact region at the center of a galaxy that emits a significant amount of energy across the electromagnetic spectrum, with characteristics indicating that this luminosity is not produced by the stars.

== Supernovae ==
Three supernovae have been observed in NGC 1578:

- SN 2013fz (Type Ia, mag. 15.1) was discovered by Stuart Parker as part of the Backyard Observatory Supernova Search (BOSS) on 2 November 2013.
- SN 2014 cd (Type Ia, mag. 15.9) was discovered by Stuart Parker as part of the Backyard Observatory Supernova Search (BOSS) on 9 August 2014.
- SN 2025absv (Type II-P, mag. 18.816) was discovered by ATLAS on 23 October 2025.

== See also ==
- List of NGC objects (1001–2000)
