= NGC 5643 =

Galaxy in the constellation Lupus

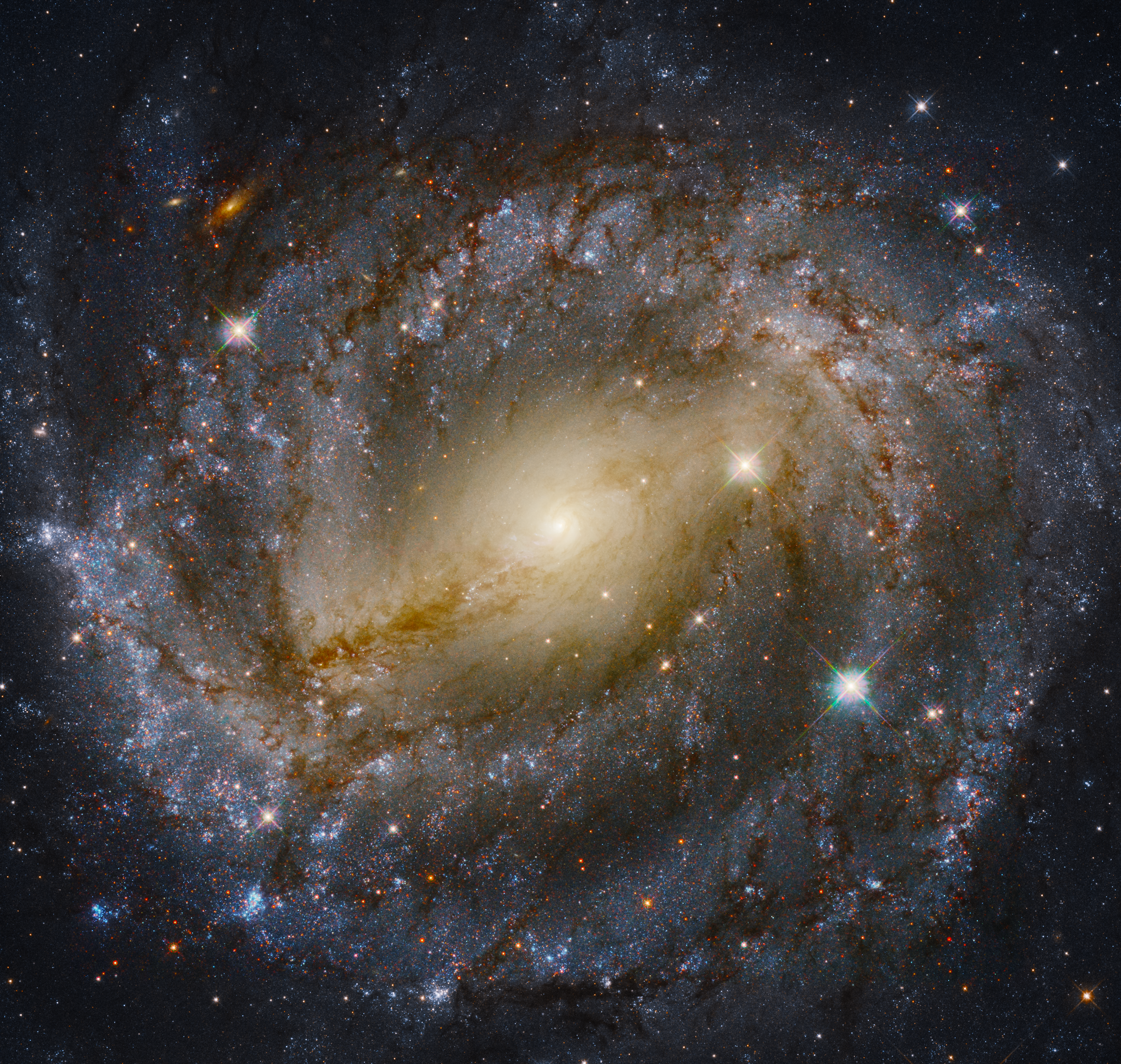
- NGC 5643 imaged by the Hubble Space Telescope

Observation data (J2000 epoch)
- Constellation: Lupus
- Right ascension: 14^{h} 32^{m} 40.7^{s}
- Declination: −44° 10′ 28″
- Redshift: 1199 ± 2 km/s
- Distance: 41 Mly (12.5 Mpc)
- Apparent magnitude (V): 10.7

Characteristics
- Type: SAB(rs)c
- Size: 21.09 kpc (68,800 ly) (diameter; D_{25} isophote)
- Apparent size (V): 4.6′ × 4.0′

Other designations
- ESO 272- G 016, MCG -07-30-003, PGC 51969

NGC 5643 is an intermediate spiral galaxy in the constellation Lupus. Based on the tip of the red-giant branch distance indicator, it is located at a distance of about 40 million light-years (12.5 megaparsecs). NGC 5643 has an active galactic nucleus and is a type II Seyfert galaxy.

== Observation history ==
The galaxy was first discovered by James Dunlop on May 10, 1826, with his 9-inch reflector telescope, who described it as exceedingly faint. The galaxy was also spotted by John Herschel and added to the General Catalogue of Nebulae and Clusters as number 3572. The galaxy is located only 15 degrees from the galactic plane.

== Structure ==
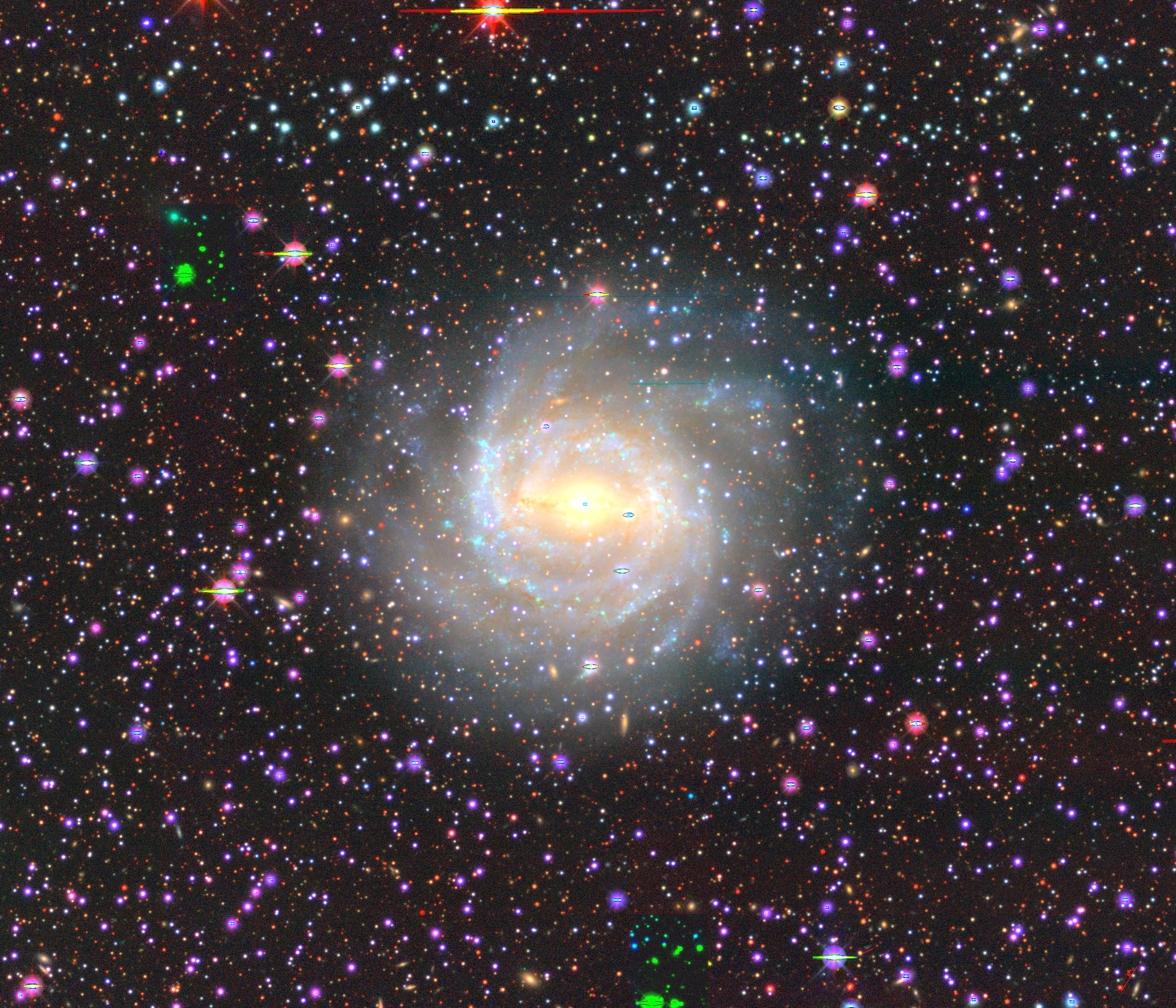
NGC 5643 imaged by Legacy Surveys

NGC 5643 is a grand design spiral galaxy, with two well-defined, symmetric arms. In the circumnuclear region, other dust spirals are present, but the two main dust arms are wider. The galaxy is seen nearly face on, at an inclination of ~ 27°.

=== Active galactic nucleus ===
Center of galaxy NGC 5643 taken by ALMA and VLT.

The galaxy has a low-luminosity active galactic nucleus of Seyfert 2 type and is also a luminous infrared galaxy. The galaxy has a double-sided diffuse radiojet. The galaxy exhibits an extended emission-line region elongated along a direction close to the radio position angle of 87°±3°. Chris Simpson et al. analysed images takes from the WFPC2 camera of the Hubble Space Telescope in [O III] λ5007 and Hα and found emission extending eastward for at least 1.8 kpc and in the [O III]/Hα map a well-defined V-shaped structure that they identified as the projection of a tridimensional ionisation cone, which shares the same axis with the radio emission. A dust lane perpendicular to this axis obstructs the nucleus from direct view. A disk of material was found when the data cubes of VLT were analysed. It is aligned with the nucleus, circles it, and may provide gas to the active galactic nucleus. The mass of the supermassive black hole has been estimated based on the galaxy stellar velocity dispersion to be 10^{6.4} M⊙. It has been proposed that the gas outflow has led to star formation on two locations on the bar of the galaxy which lie at the location where the gas from the nucleus encounters the dense material of the bar.

Based on observations of the galaxy by the XMM Newton telescope in 2009, it was found to have a Compton–thick active galactic nucleus. Also the galaxy emits soft X-rays, mainly from photoionized matter. The presence of the compton-thick column which obstructs the nucleus was confirmed from observations by NuSTAR.

=== Ultraluminous X-ray source ===
In 2004, Guainazzi et al. detected in the images from XMM-Newton an ultraluminous X-ray source, named NGC 5643 ULX1, located within 0.8 arcminutes from the nucleus. The source outshone the nucleus in X-rays, and if it lies within NGC 5643, its luminosity exceeds 10^{40} erg/s. Its luminosity is variable. The X-rays could be produced either by an advection dominated disc or a Comptonising corona and the X-ray source is considered to be a black hole of stellar origin of approximately 30 solar masses.

== Supernovae ==
Two supernovae have been recorded within the galaxy:

- SN 2013aa (Type Ia, mag. 11.9) was discovered by Stuart Parker from New Zealand on 13 February 2013, as part of the Backyard Observatory Supernova Search. It was classified as a Type Ia a few days before maximum brightness. It got as bright as magnitude 11.3, making it the brightest supernova of the year 2013.
- SN 2017cbv (Type Ia, mag. 16.0451) was discovered by the Distance Less Than 40 Mpc Survey (DLT40) on 10 March 2017. It increased in magnitude from 15.8 to 14.8 within the next day. It got as bright as magnitude 11.5, making it the brightest supernova of the year 2017.

== Nearby galaxies ==
NGC 5643 has a satellite dwarf galaxy, ESO 273-014. NGC 5643 is the most prominent member of a small galaxy group that also includes NGC 5530.
