= NGC 2297 =

Galaxy in the constellation Pictor

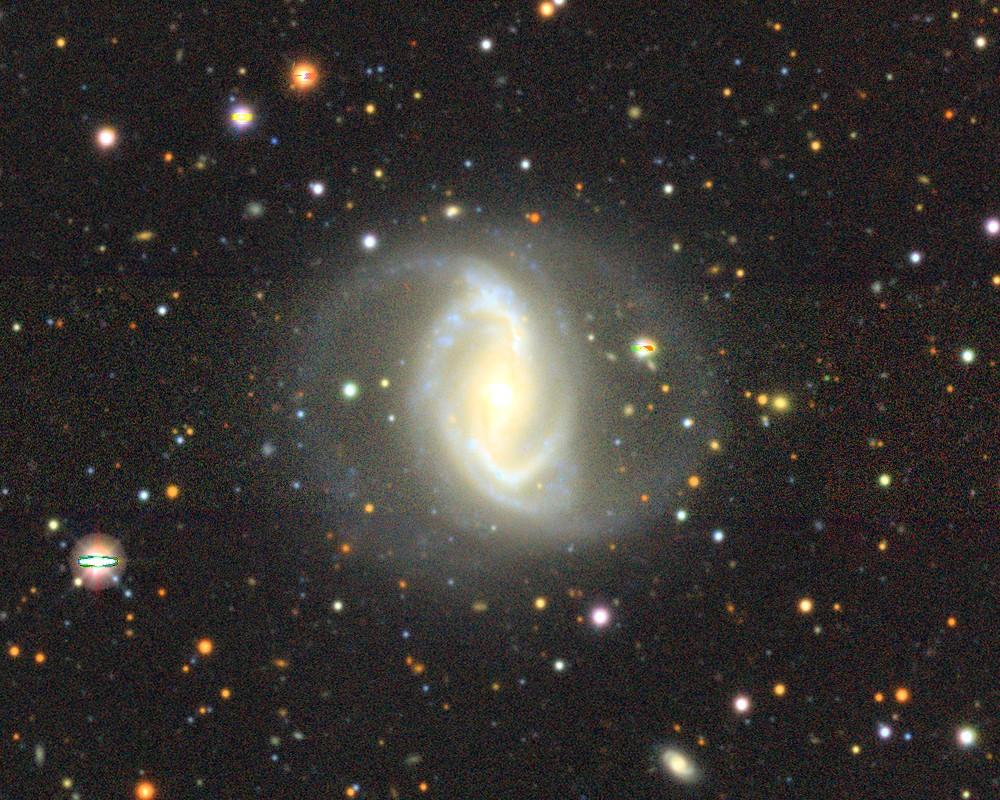
- NGC 2297 imaged by Legacy Surveys

Observation data (J2000 epoch)
- Constellation: Pictor
- Right ascension: 06^{h} 44^{m} 24.5585^{s}
- Declination: −63° 43′ 02.443″
- Redshift: 0.011325±0.000110
- Heliocentric radial velocity: 3,395±33 km/s
- Distance: 168.4 ± 12.0 Mly (51.62 ± 3.68 Mpc)
- Group or cluster: [CHM2007] HDC 415
- Apparent magnitude (V): 13.37

Characteristics
- Type: SAB(rs)bc
- Size: ~104,300 ly (31.97 kpc) (estimated)
- Apparent size (V): 1.4′ × 1.3′

Other designations
- ESO 087- G 040, IRAS 06440-6339, 2MASS J06442460-6343026, PGC 19524

NGC 2297 is an intermediate spiral galaxy in the constellation of Pictor. Its velocity with respect to the cosmic microwave background is 3,500±34 km/s, which corresponds to a Hubble distance of 168.4 ± 12.0 Mly (51.62 ± 3.68 Mpc). It was discovered by British astronomer John Herschel on 31 January 1835.

== HDC 415 group ==
NGC 2297 is a member of a small group of galaxies known as [CHM2007] HDC 415. The other four galaxies in the group are NGC 2305, NGC 2307, ESO 87-38, and LEDA 326726.

== Supernovae ==
Two supernovae have been observed in NGC 2297:

- SN 2017ixh (Type Ic, mag. 17) was discovered by Patrick Pearl as part of the Backyard Observatory Supernova Search (BOSS) on 15 December 2017.
- SN 2025yii (Type Ia, mag. 19.259) was discovered by ATLAS on 23 September 2025.

== See also ==
- List of NGC objects (2001–3000)
