= NGC 5012 =

Galaxy in the constellation Coma Berenices

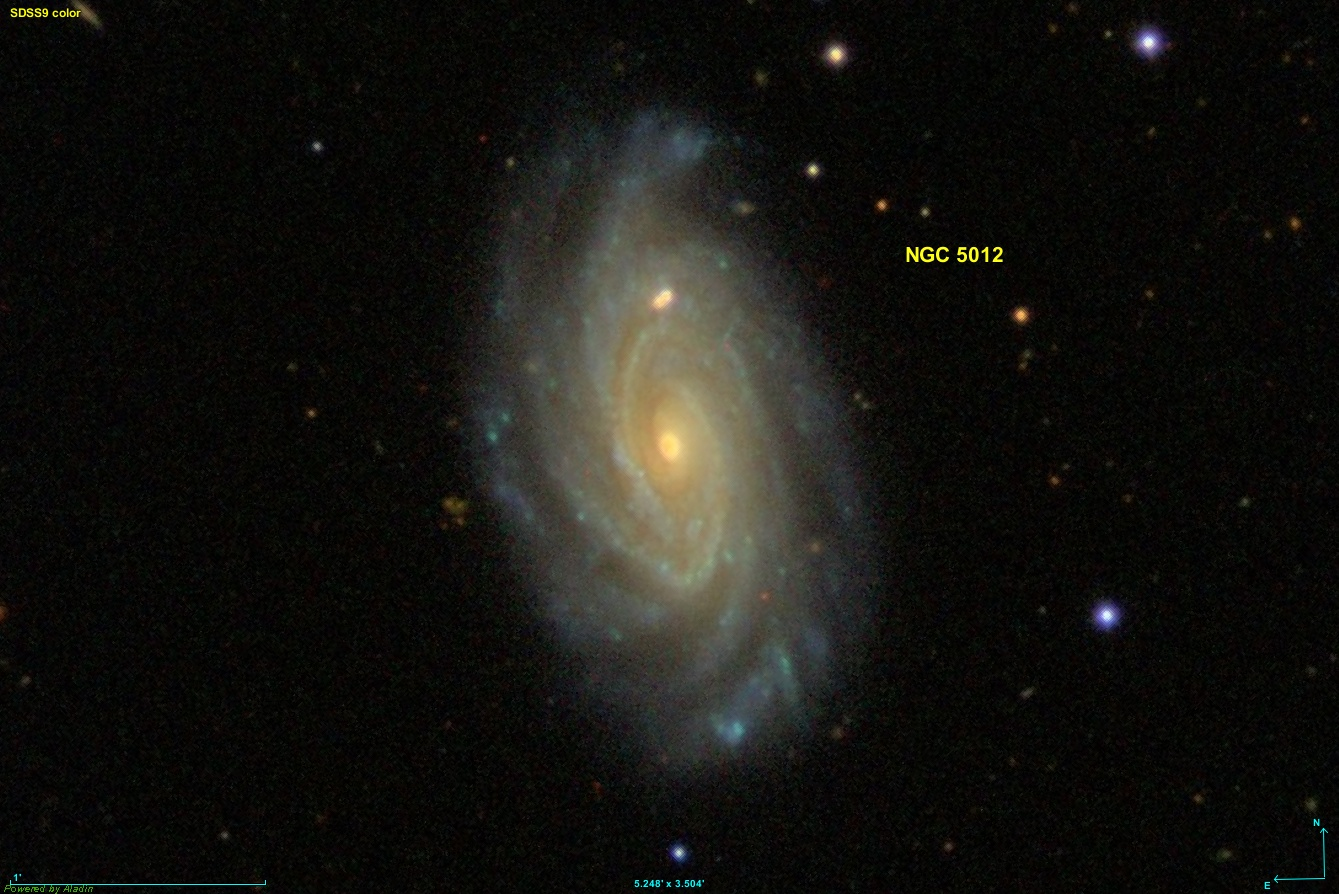
- NGC 5012 imaged by SDSS

Observation data (J2000 epoch)
- Constellation: Coma Berenices
- Right ascension: 13^{h} 11^{m} 37.0480^{s}
- Declination: +22° 54′ 56.219″
- Redshift: 0.008694±0.00000638
- Heliocentric radial velocity: 2,606±2 km/s
- Distance: 122.14 ± 4.22 Mly (37.447 ± 1.295 Mpc)
- Group or cluster: NGC 5012 group (LGG 336)
- Apparent magnitude (V): 12.8g

Characteristics
- Type: SAB(rs)c
- Size: ~105,200 ly (32.26 kpc) (estimated)
- Apparent size (V): 2.90′ × 1.02′

Other designations
- IRAS 13091+2310, 2MASX J13113705+2254556, UGC 8270, MCG +04-31-012, PGC 45795, CGCG 130-016

NGC 5012 is an intermediate spiral galaxy in the constellation of Coma Berenices. Its velocity with respect to the cosmic microwave background is 2,883±19 km/s, which corresponds to a Hubble distance of 138.7 ± 9.8 Mly (42.52 ± 2.99 Mpc). However, 17 non-redshift measurements give a closer mean distance of 122.14 ± 4.22 Mly (37.447 ± 1.295 Mpc). It was discovered by German-British astronomer William Herschel on 10 April 1785.

NGC 5012 is a LINER galaxy, i.e. a galaxy whose nucleus has an emission spectrum characterized by broad lines of weakly ionized atoms.

== NGC 5012 group ==
NGC 5012 is the largest and brightest member of a trio of galaxies. The other two galaxies in the NGC 5012 group (also known as LGG 336) are NGC 5016 and NGC 5012A.

== Supernovae ==
Two supernovae have been observed in NGC 5012:

- SN 1997eg (Type IIn, mag. 15.6) was discovered by Japanese amateur astronomer Masakatsu Aoki on 4 December 1997.
- SN 2020kyg (Type Iax[02cx-like], mag. 19.79) was discovered by ATLAS on 24 May 2020.

== See also ==
- List of NGC objects (5001–6000)
