= SN 2003B =

Supernova event inside the galaxy NGC 1097 in the constellation Fornax

- Event type: Supernova
- II
- Date: January 5, 2003
- Constellation: Fornax
- Right ascension: 02^{h} 46.3^{m}
- Declination: -30° 17'
- Epoch: B1950.0
- Galactic coordinates: 226.8077 -64.6995
- Distance: 45 Mly
- Remnant: ?
- Host: NGC 1097
- Notable features: first supernova in NGC 1097 for 21st century
- Peak apparent magnitude: +15
- Other designations: SN 2003B

SN 2003B was a Type II supernova that was discovered in NGC 1097 by Robert Owen Evans on January 5, 2003.

== See also ==
- SN 2006X
- Spiral Galaxy NGC 1097
