= NGC 1097 =

Galaxy in the constellation Fornax

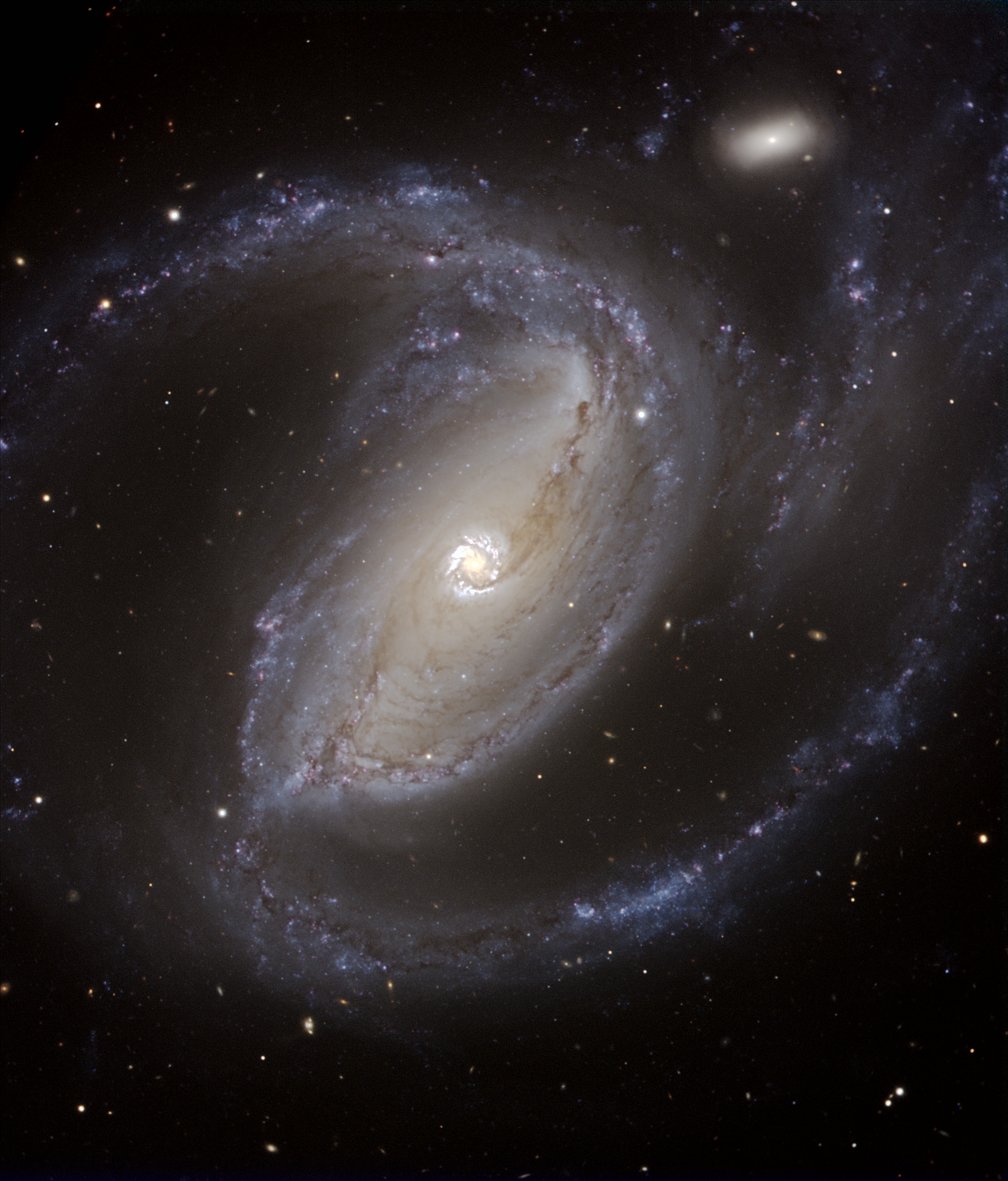
- NGC 1097 as taken from VLT

Observation data (J2000 epoch)
- Constellation: Fornax
- Right ascension: 02^{h} 46^{m} 19.0584^{s}
- Declination: −30° 16′ 29.676″
- Redshift: 0.004240
- Heliocentric radial velocity: 1,271±3 km/s
- Distance: 45 million ly
- Apparent magnitude (V): 10.2

Characteristics
- Type: SB(s)b
- Size: ~220,500 ly (67.62 kpc) (estimated)
- Apparent size (V): 9.3′ × 6.3′

Other designations
- ESO 416- G 20, Caldwell 67, IRAS 02441-3029, Arp 77, UGCA 41, MCG -05-07-024, PGC 10488

NGC 1097 (also known as Caldwell 67) is a barred spiral galaxy about 45 million light years away in the constellation Fornax. It was discovered by William Herschel on 9 October 1790. It is a severely interacting galaxy with obvious tidal debris and distortions caused by interaction with the companion galaxy NGC 1097A.

== General information ==
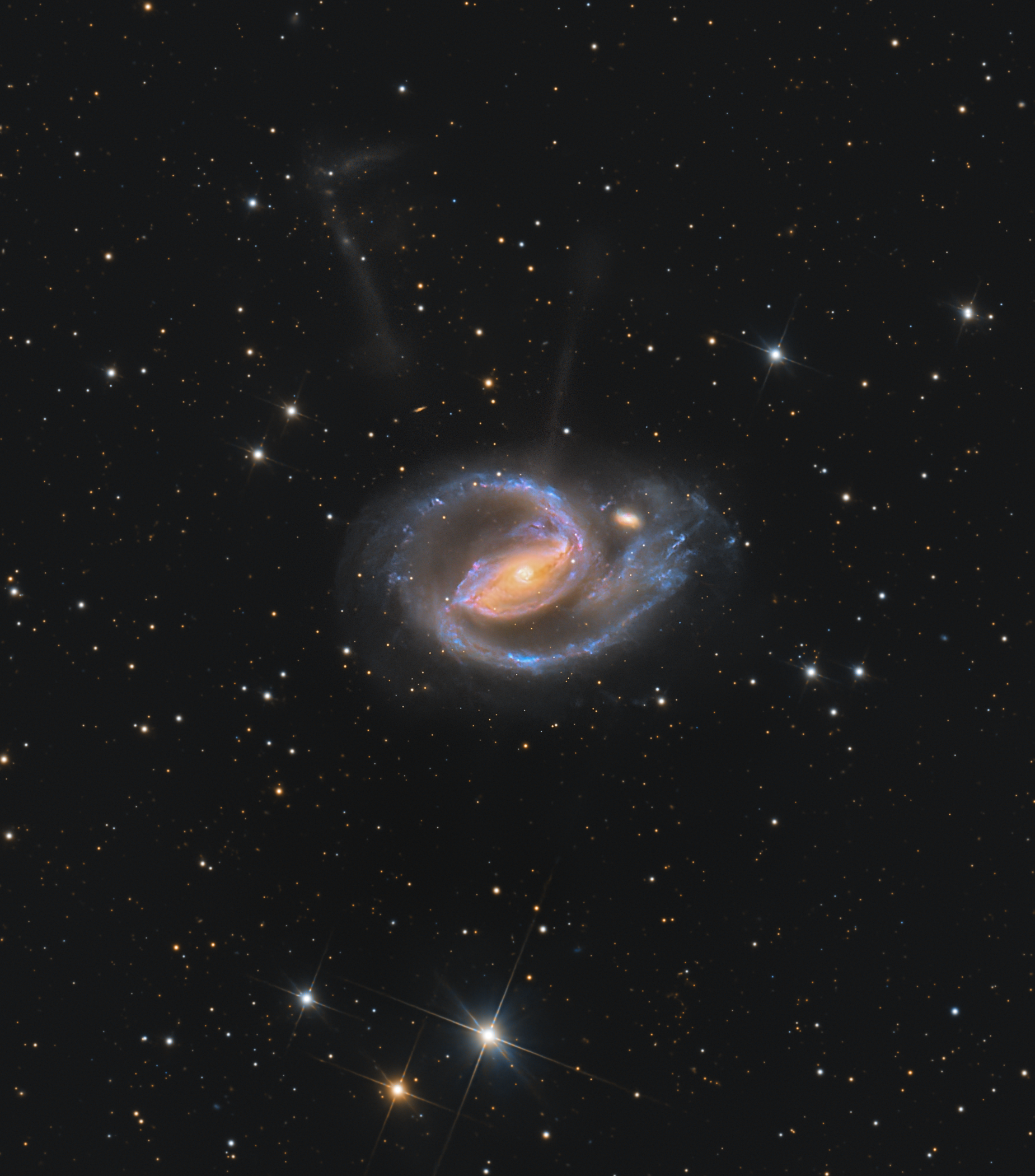
NGC 1097 with optical jets that appear to emanate from the galaxy

NGC 1097 is also a Seyfert galaxy. Deep photographs revealed four narrow optical jets that appear to emanate from the nucleus. These have been interpreted as manifestations of the (currently weak) active nucleus. Subsequent analysis of the brightest jet's radio-to-X-ray spectral energy distribution were able to rule out synchrotron and thermal free-free emission. The optical jets are in fact composed of stars. The failure to detect atomic hydrogen gas in the jets (under the assumption that they were an example of tidal tails) using deep 21 cm HI imaging with the Very Large Array radio telescope and numerical simulations led to the current interpretation that the jets are actually the shattered remains of a cannibalized dwarf galaxy.

NGC 1097 has a supermassive black hole at its center, which is 140 million times the mass of the Sun. Around the central black hole is a glowing ring of star-forming regions with a network of gas and dust that spirals from the ring to the black hole. An inflow of material toward the central bar of the galaxy causes new stars to be created in the ring. The ring is approximately 5,000 light-years in diameter, the spiral arms of the galaxy extend tens of thousands of light-years beyond the ring.

NGC 1097 has two satellite galaxies, NGC 1097A and NGC 1097B. Dwarf elliptical galaxy NGC 1097A is the larger of the two. It is a peculiar elliptical galaxy that orbits 42,000 light-years from the center of NGC 1097. Dwarf galaxy NGC 1097B (5 million solar masses), the outermost one, was discovered by its HI emission, and appears to be a typical dwarf irregular. Little else is known about it.

== Supernovae ==
Four supernovae have been observed in NGC 1097:

- SN 1992bd (Type II, mag. 15) was discovered by Chris Smith and Lisa Wells on 12 October 1992.
- SN 1999eu (Type II-pec, mag. 17.3) was discovered by Masakatsu Aoki on 5 November 1999.
- SN 2003B (Type II, mag. 15) was discovered by Robert Evans on 5 January 2003.
- SN 2023rve (Type II, mag. 14) was discovered by Mohammad Odeh on 8 August 2023.

== Image Gallery ==
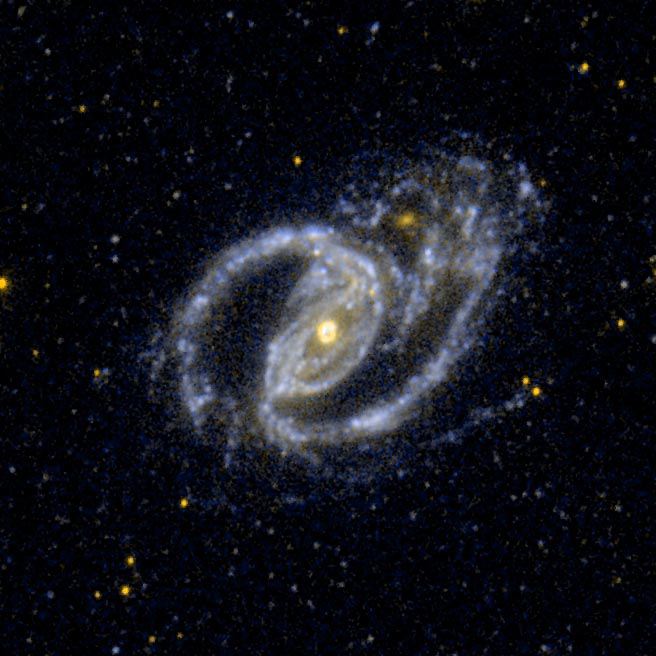
Ultraviolet, GALEX

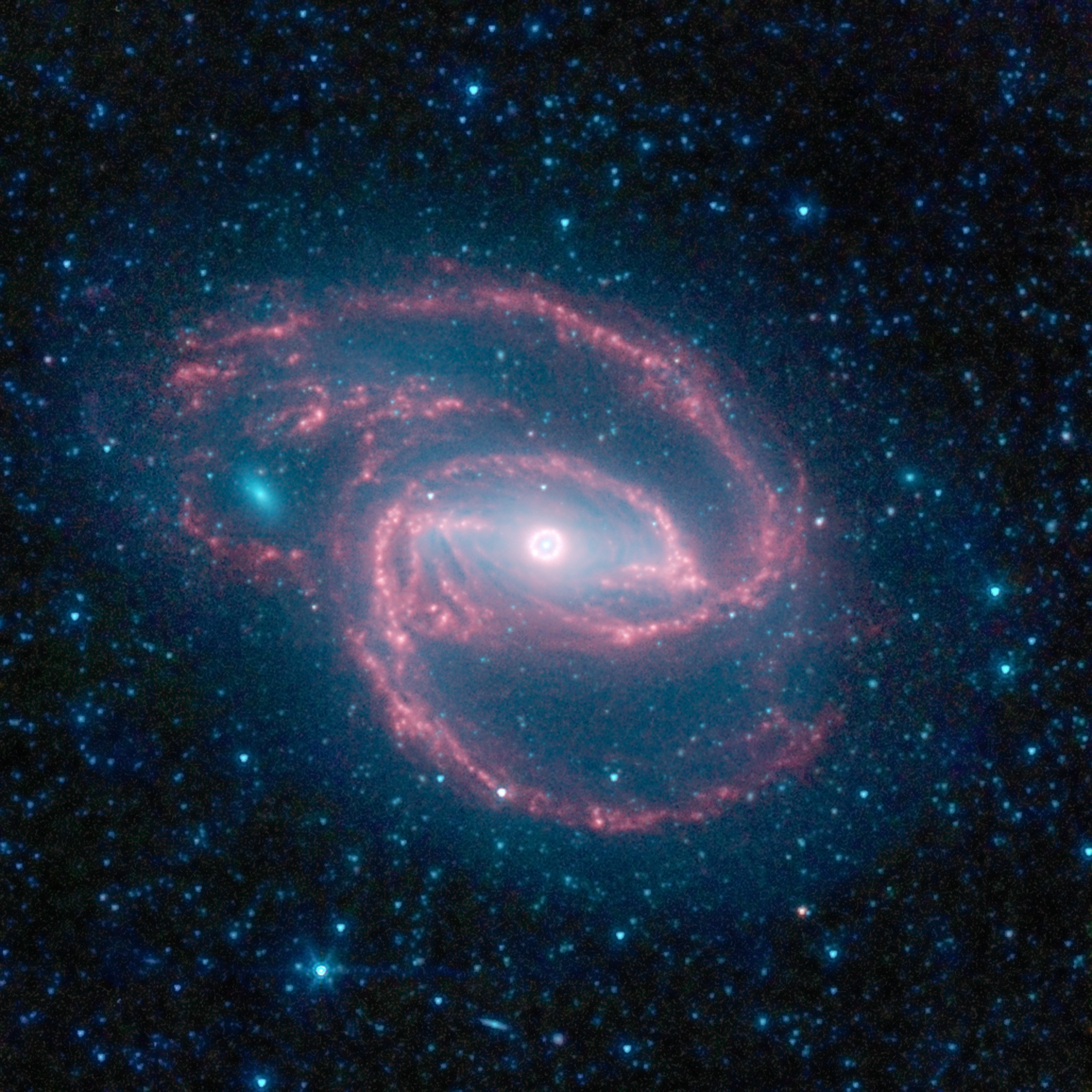
Infrared, Spitzer Space Telescope

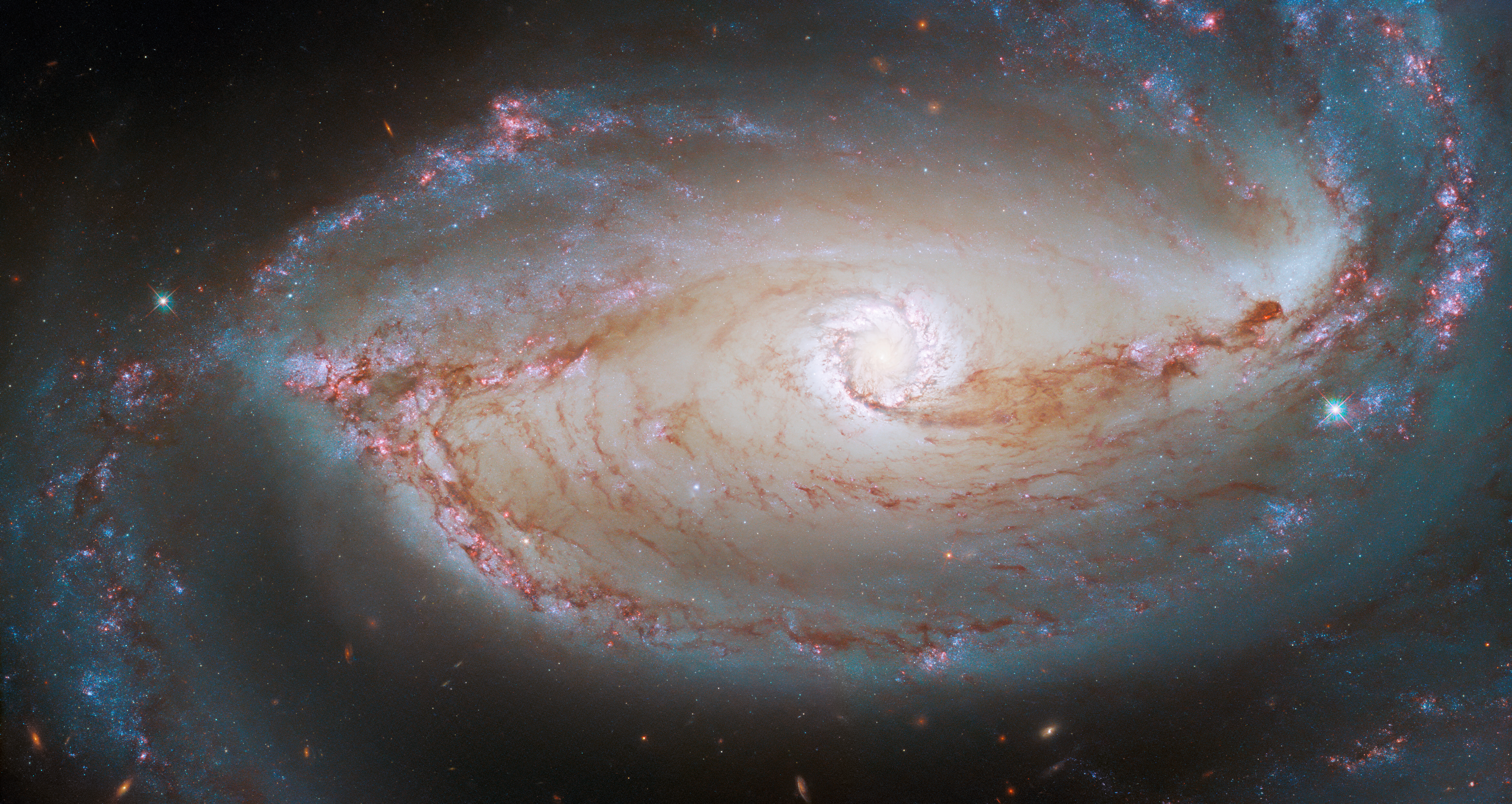
Central region, Hubble Space Telescope

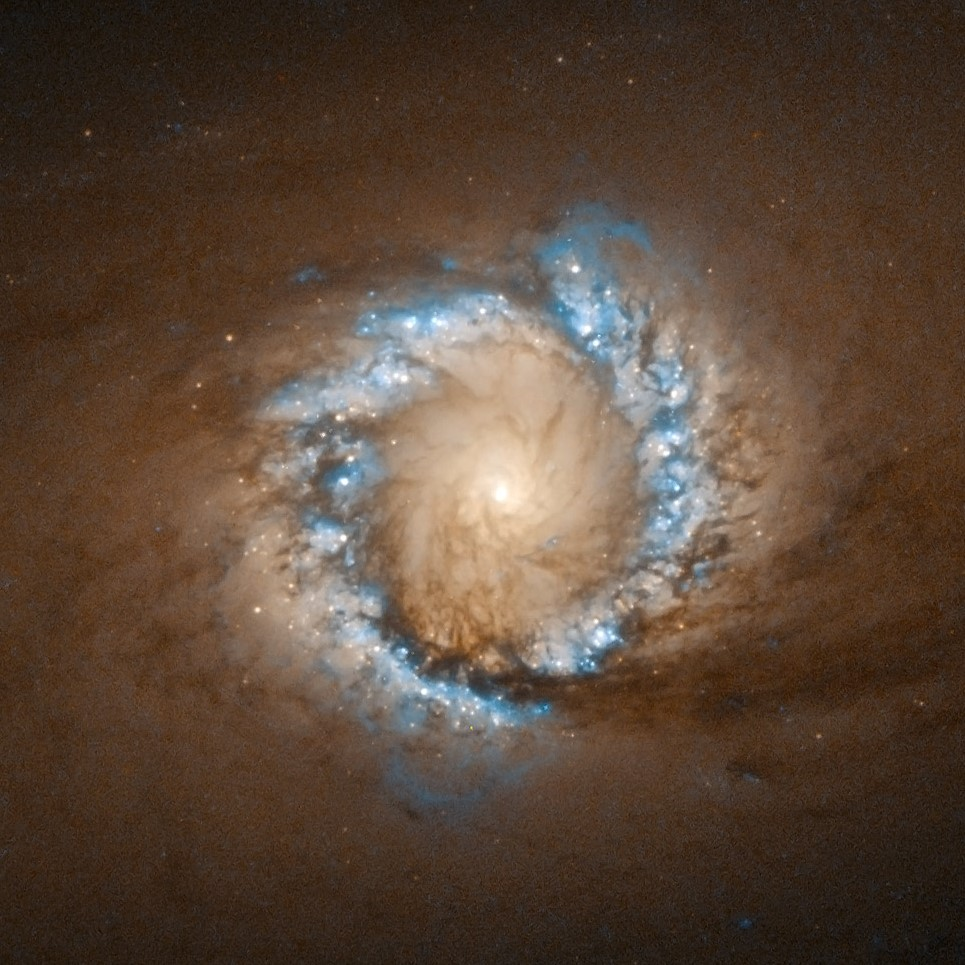
Ring of star birth, and dust, gas and debris from the galaxy, which are being funneled into the supermassive black hole at its centre. Hubble Space Telescope, 2004

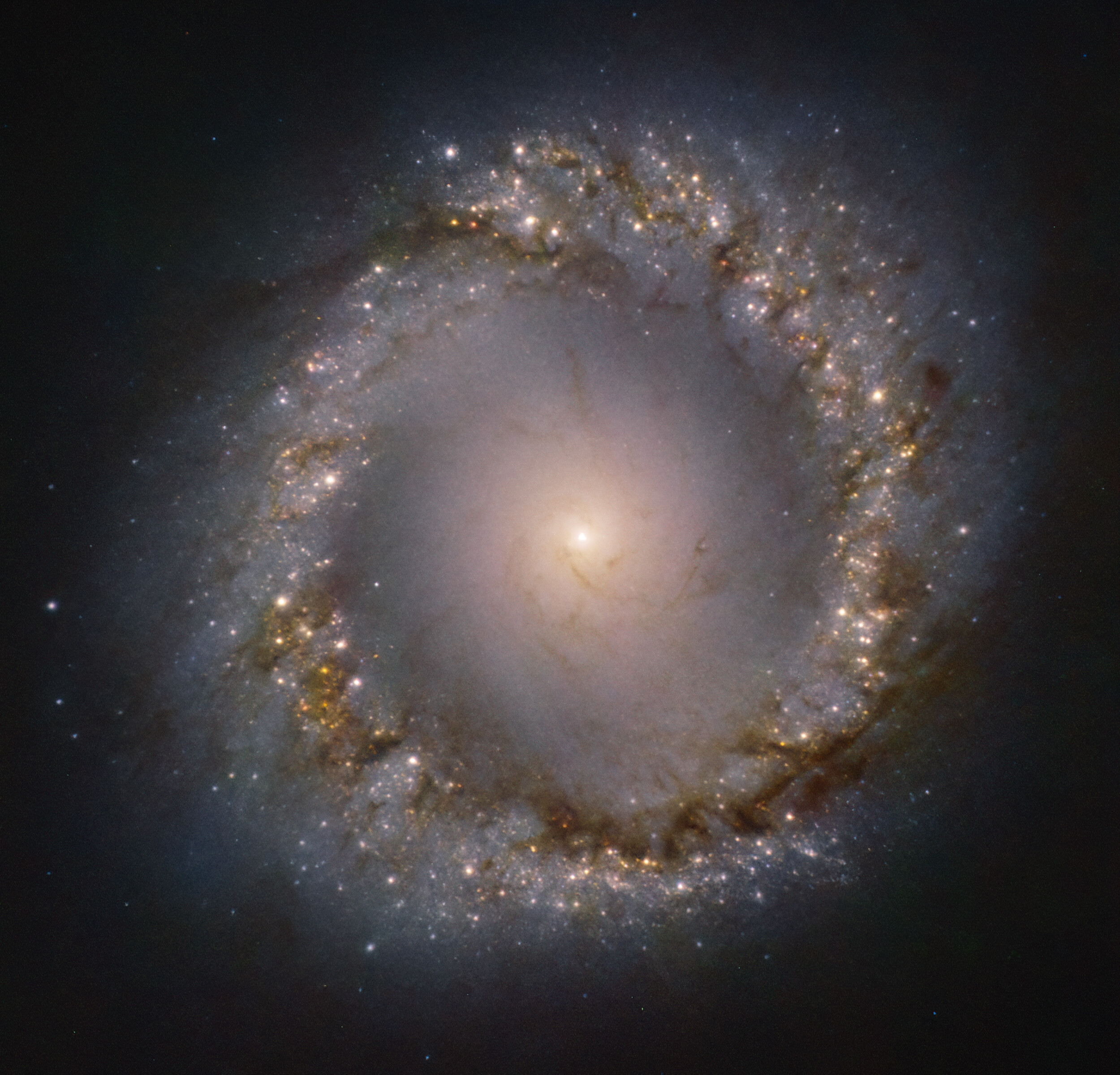
... and with 8 meter diameter Very Large Telescope and adaptive optic, 2022

== See also ==
- NGC 1300, a barred spiral galaxy
- NGC 1232, an intermediate spiral galaxy
- NGC 7479, another example of a barred spiral galaxy
