= NGC 7691 =

Galaxy in the constellation Pegasus

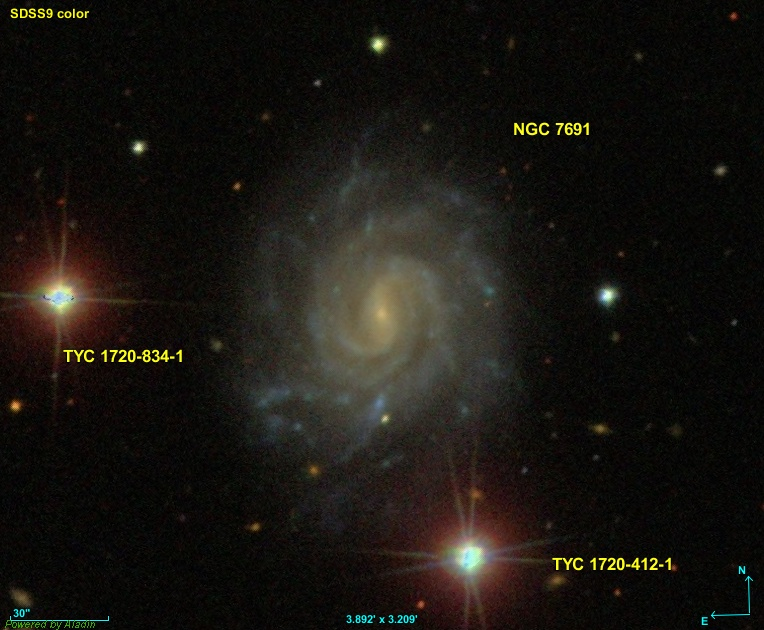
- NGC 7691 imaged by SDSS

Observation data (J2000 epoch)
- Constellation: Pegasus
- Right ascension: 23^{h} 32^{m} 24.4185^{s}
- Declination: +15° 50′ 52.392″
- Redshift: 0.013479±0.00000300
- Heliocentric radial velocity: 4,041±1 km/s
- Distance: 199.44 ± 9.12 Mly (61.150 ± 2.796 Mpc)
- Group or cluster: NGC 7711 group (LGG 477)
- Apparent magnitude (V): 13.9g

Characteristics
- Type: SAB(rs)bc
- Size: ~153,200 ly (46.96 kpc) (estimated)
- Apparent size (V): 1.67′ × 1.25′

Other designations
- IRAS 23299+1534, 2MASX J23322441+1550520, UGC 12654, MCG +03-60-001, PGC 71699, CGCG 455-009

NGC 7691 is an intermediate spiral galaxy in the constellation of Pegasus. Its velocity with respect to the cosmic microwave background is 3,676±26 km/s, which corresponds to a Hubble distance of 176.8 ± 12.4 Mly (54.21 ± 3.81 Mpc). However, four non-redshift measurements give a farther mean distance of 199.44 ± 9.12 Mly (61.150 ± 2.796 Mpc). It was discovered by German-British astronomer William Herschel on 16 October 1784.

== NGC 7711 group ==
NGC 7691 is part of the NGC 7711 group (also known as LGG 477). This galaxy group contains seven members, including NGC 7711, NGC 7722, UGC 12633, UGC 12640, UGC 12653, and UGC 12673.

== Supernova ==
One supernova has been observed in NGC 7691:

- SN 2014az (Type II-P, mag. 16.3) was discovered by Stuart Parker and the Backyard Observatory Supernova Search (BOSS) on 30 April 2014.

== See also ==
- List of NGC objects (7001–7840)
