= NGC 3464 =

Spiral galaxy in the constellation Hydra

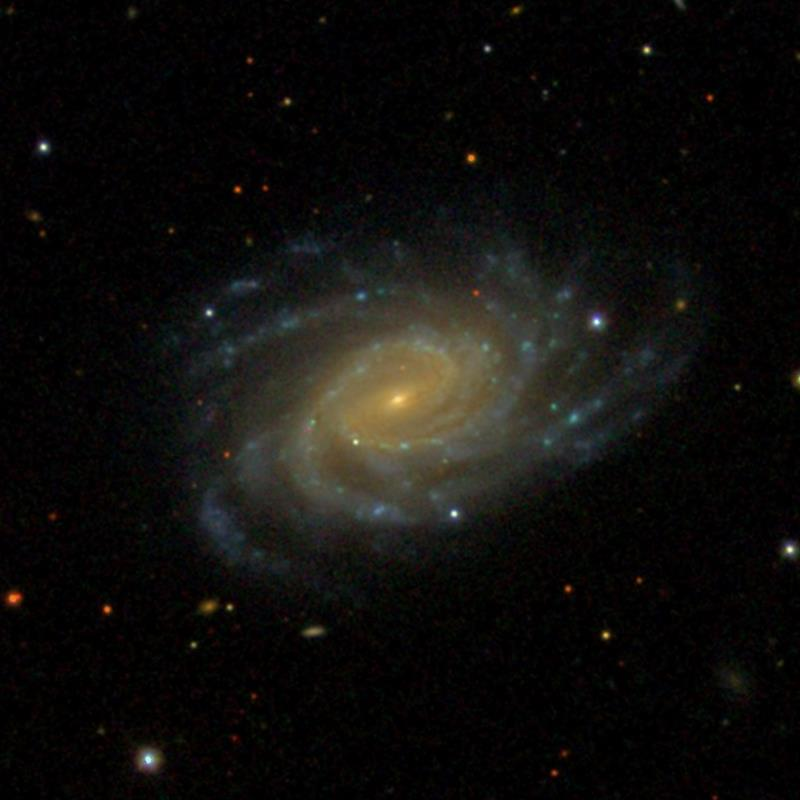
- NGC 3464 imaged by SDSS

Observation data (J2000 epoch)
- Constellation: Hydra
- Right ascension: 10^{h} 54^{m} 40^{s}
- Declination: −21° 04′ 00″
- Redshift: 0.012462
- Distance: 167.3 ± 13.3 Mly (51.3 ± 4.1 Mpc)
- Apparent magnitude (V): 12.4

Characteristics
- Type: SB(rs)c
- Size: 49.27 kiloparsecs (160,620 light-years) (diameter; 25.0 mag/arcsec^{2} B-band isophote)
- Apparent size (V): 2.6' × 1.7'

Other designations
- IRAS 10521-2047, UGCA 222, MCG -03-28-021, PGC 32778

NGC 3464 is a barred spiral galaxy in the constellation of Hydra, discovered 14 January 1886 by Ormond Stone.

== Supernovae ==
Four supernovae have been observed in NGC 3464:

- SN 2002J (Type Ic, mag. 16.8) was discovered by LOTOSS (Lick Observatory and Tenagra Observatory Supernova Searches) on 21 January 2002.
- SN 2002hy (Type Ib, mag. 16.4) was discovered by Berto Monard on 12 November 2002.
- SN 2015H (Type Ia, mag. 16.9) was discovered by Stu Parker as part of the Backyard Observatory Supernova Search (BOSS) 10 February 2015.
- SN 2019dxd (Type II, mag. 18.822) was discovered by ATLAS on 24 April 2019.
