= IC 438 =

Galaxy in the constellation Lepus

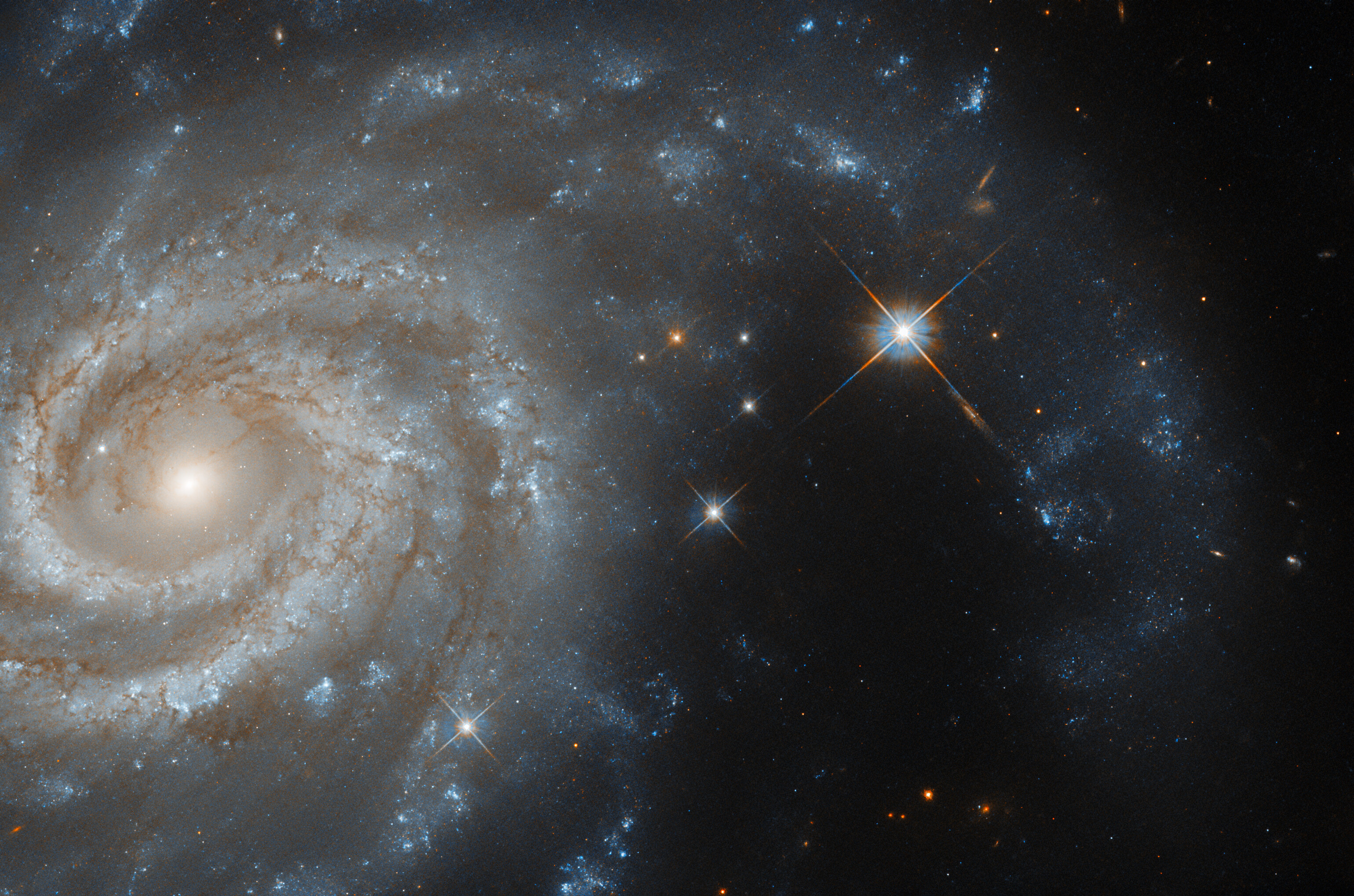
- IC 438 imaged by the Hubble Space Telescope in 2021

Observation data (J2000 epoch)
- Constellation: Lepus
- Right ascension: 05^{h} 53^{m} 00.0676^{s}
- Declination: −17° 52′ 33.684″
- Redshift: 0.004256±0.000006
- Heliocentric radial velocity: 3,123±4 km/s
- Distance: 136.45 ± 4.29 Mly (41.835 ± 1.314 Mpc)
- Group or cluster: IC 438 Group (LGG 134)
- Apparent magnitude (V): 12.74

Characteristics
- Type: SA(rs)c
- Size: ~155,100 ly (47.55 kpc) (estimated)
- Apparent size (V): 2.8′ × 2.1′

Other designations
- ESO 555- G 009, IRAS 05508-1753, UGCA 115, MCG -03-15-025, PGC 18047

IC 438 is a spiral galaxy in the constellation of Lepus. Its velocity with respect to the cosmic microwave background is 3,199±6 km/s, which corresponds to a Hubble distance of 153.9 ± 10.8 Mly (47.18 ± 3.30 Mpc). However, 17 non-redshift measurements give a much closer distance of 136.45 ± 4.29 Mly (41.835 ± 1.314 Mpc). It was discovered by American astronomer Lewis Swift on 7 January 1891.

IC 438 is a Seyfert I Galaxy, i.e. it has a quasar-like nucleus with very high surface brightnesses whose spectra reveal strong, high-ionisation emission lines, but unlike quasars, the host galaxy is clearly detectable.

== IC 438 Group ==
According to A.M. Garcia, IC 438 is one of five members of the IC 438 galaxy group (also known as LGG 134), which includes IC 2143, UGCA 113, MCG-03-15-021, and ESO 555-5.

== Supernovae ==
Three supernovae have been observed in IC 438:

- SN 1997B (Type Ic, mag. 16.5) was discovered by Alessandro Gabrijelcic on 13 January 1997.
- SN 2016blx (Type II, mag. 16.5) was discovered by the Backyard Observatory Supernova Search (BOSS) on 9 April 2016.
- SN 2017gbb (Type Iax[02cx-like], mag. 16.39) was discovered by the Gaia Photometric Science Alerts programme on 9 August 2017.

== Image gallery ==
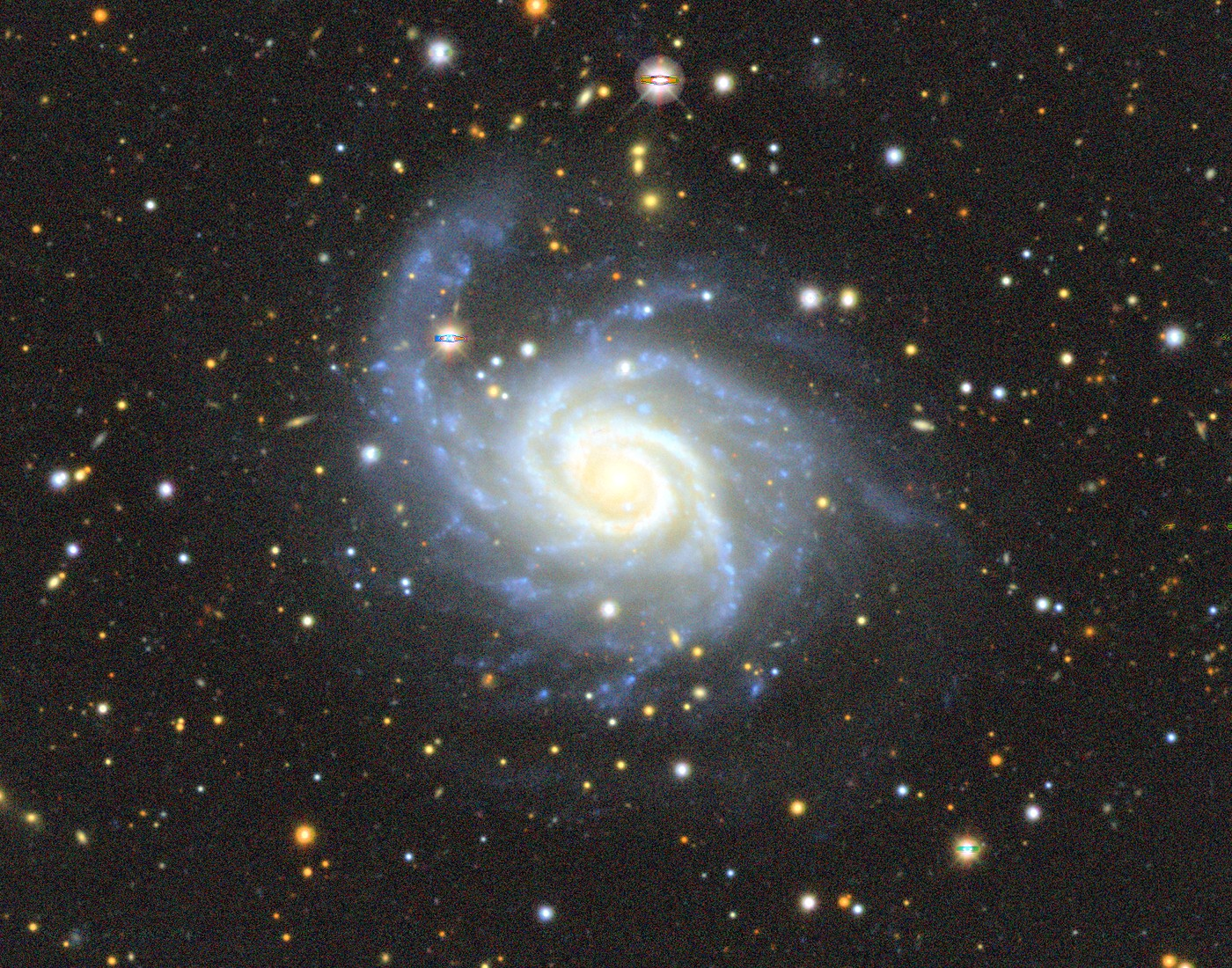
IC 438 imaged by Legacy Surveys

== See also ==
- List of IC objects
