= NGC 5584 =

Galaxy in the constellation Virgo

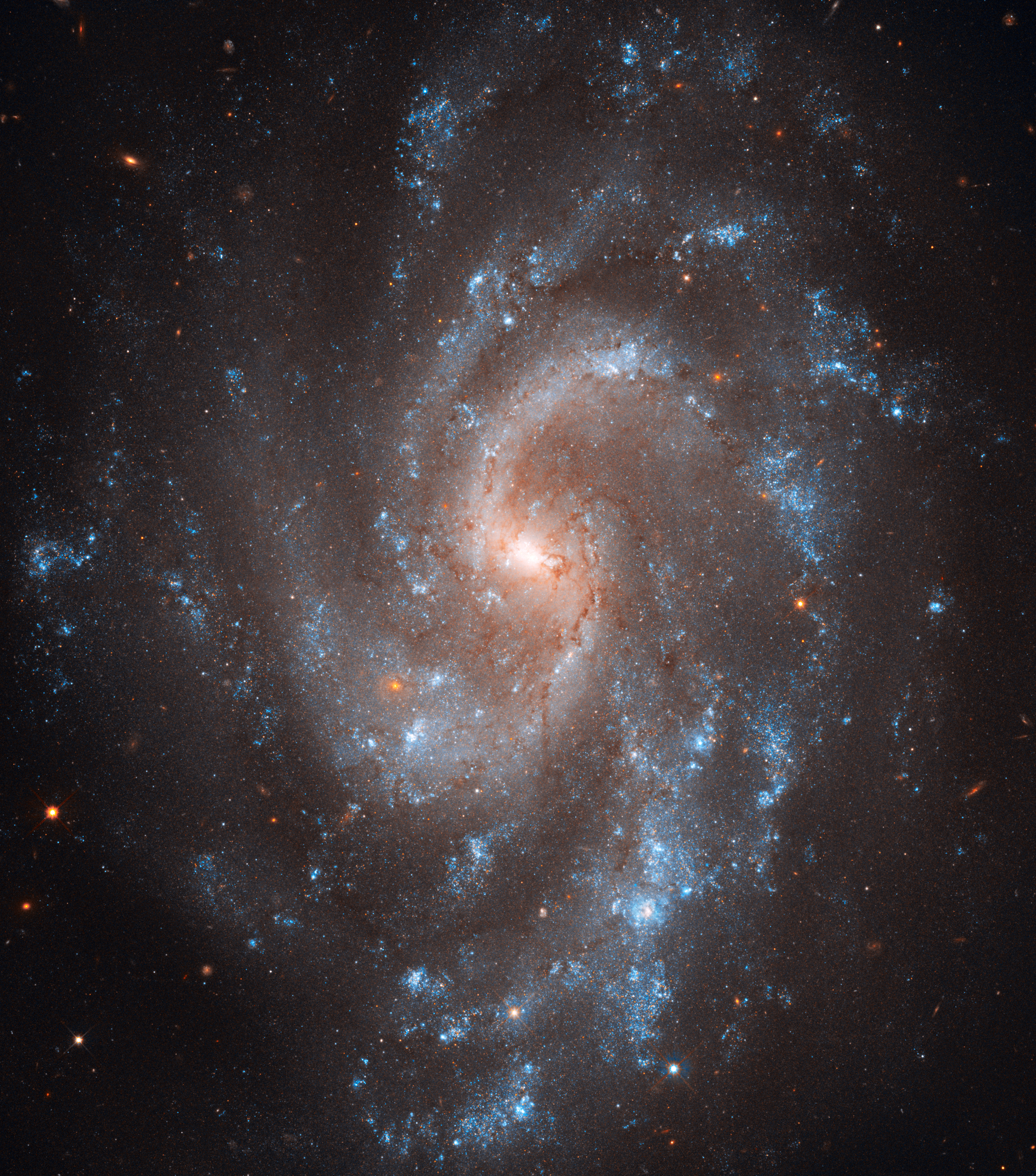
- Composite of several exposures taken in visible light between January and April 2010 with Hubble's Wide Field Camera 3

Observation data (J2000 epoch)
- Constellation: Virgo
- Right ascension: 14^{h} 22^{m} 3.811^{s}
- Declination: −00° 23′ 14.82″
- Redshift: 0.005525
- Heliocentric radial velocity: 1,637 km/s
- Distance: 91.9 Mly (28.2 Mpc); 75.0 Mly (23.01 Mpc); 73.4 Mly (22.5 Mpc)
- Apparent magnitude (B): 12.80

Characteristics
- Type: SAB(rs)cd, SA(s)cd
- Apparent size (V): 1.320′ × 0.766′

Other designations
- IRAS 14198-0009, 2MASX J14222381-0023148, NGC 5584, UGC 9201, LEDA 51344, MCG +00-37-001, SDSS J142223.76-002315.6

NGC 5584 is a barred spiral galaxy in the constellation Virgo. It was discovered July 27, 1881 by American astronomer E. E. Barnard. Distance determination using Cepheid variable measurements gives an estimate of 75 million light years, whereas the tip of the red-giant branch approach yields a distance of 73.4 million light years. It is receding with a heliocentric radial velocity of 1,637 km/s. It is a member of the Virgo III Groups, a series of galaxies and galaxy clusters strung out to the east of the Virgo Supercluster of galaxies.

The morphological class of NGC 5584 is SAB(rs)cd, which indicates this spiral galaxy has an inner bar (SAB), an incomplete inner ring structure (rs), and loosely wound spiral arms (cd). It is flocculent in appearance with only a small nucleus. Star formation is occurring along the spiral arms. The galactic plane is inclined at an angle of 42.4° to the line of sight from the Earth, and it spans more than 50,000 light-years across. 250 Cepheid variables have been observed in NGC 5584.

== Supernovae ==
Two supernovae have been observed in NGC 5584:

- SN 1996aq (Type Ic, mag. 15.7) was discovered by Masakatsu Aoki on 17 August 1996. It was offset by 15″ west and 8″ south of the galactic center. It reached magnitude 14.7 on August 18.
- SN 2007af (Type Ia, mag. 15.4) was discovered by Kōichi Itagaki on 24 February 2007, located at an offset 40″ west and 22″ of the galaxy's center. A light echo of this event was observed about 1,000 days after its discovery.
