= NGC 5247 =

Galaxy in the constellation Virgo

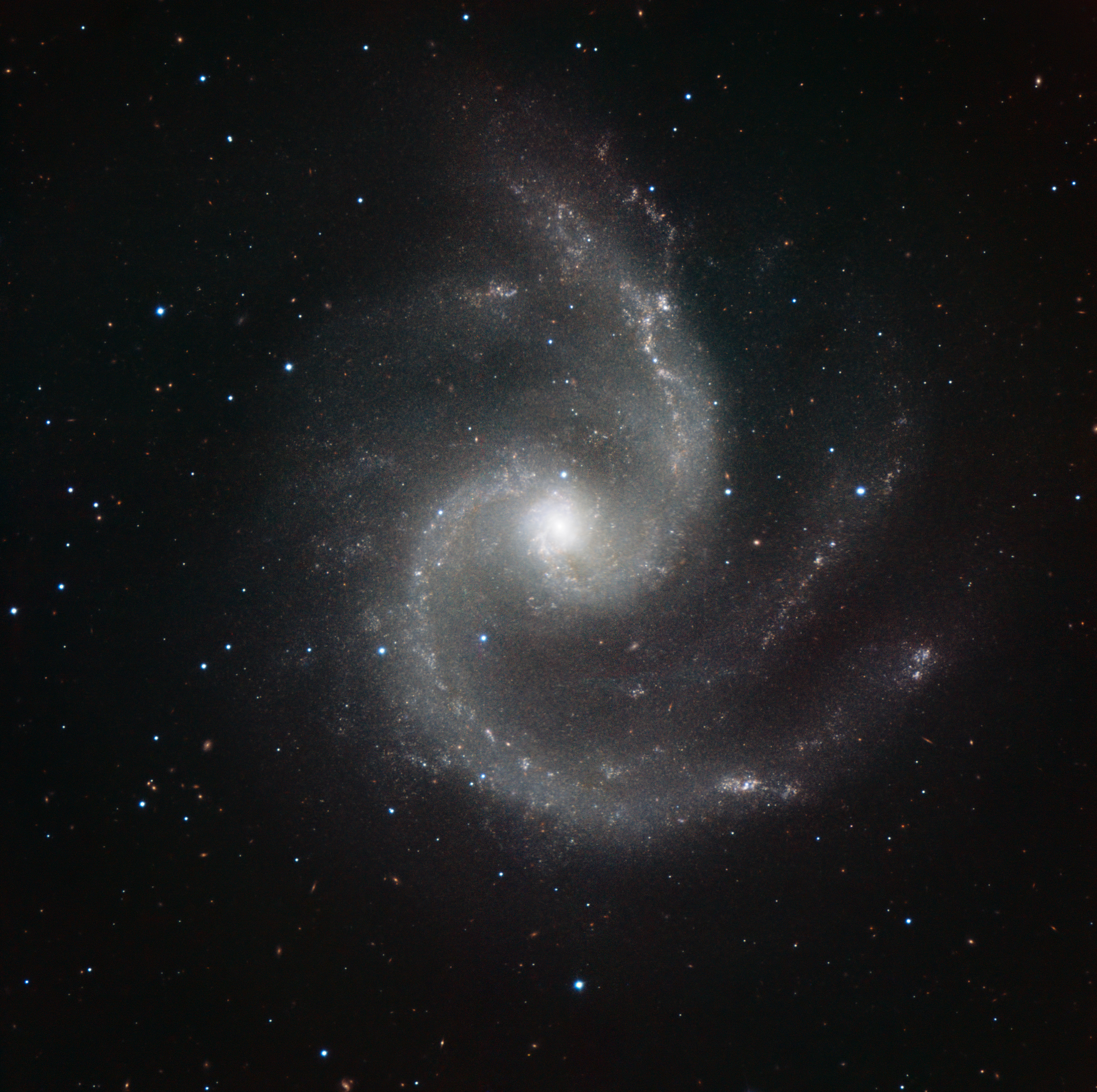
- Image of NGC 5247 made in infrared light with the HAWK-I camera on ESO's Very Large Telescope at Paranal Observatory.

Observation data (J2000 epoch)
- Constellation: Virgo
- Right ascension: 13^{h} 38^{m} 03.040^{s}
- Declination: –17° 53′ 02.50″
- Redshift: 0.004520
- Heliocentric radial velocity: +1,357 km/s
- Distance: 60.34 Mly (18.50 Mpc)
- Apparent magnitude (V): 10.5

Characteristics
- Type: SA(s)bc
- Apparent size (V): 5′.6 × 4′.9

Other designations
- UGCA 368, PGC 48171

NGC 5247 is a face-on unbarred spiral galaxy located some 60 million light years away in the constellation Virgo. It was discovered by German-British astronomer William Herschel on 7 February 1785.

NGC 5247 is a member of the Virgo II Groups, a series of galaxies and galaxy clusters strung out from the southern edge of the Virgo Supercluster. This is a grand design spiral galaxy that displays no indications of distortion caused by interaction with other galaxies. It has two spiral arms that bifurcate after wrapping halfway around the nucleus. The disk is estimated to be 4.9 ± 2.0 kly (1.5 ± 0.6 kpc) in thickness and it is inclined by roughly 28° to the line of sight.

== Supernovae ==
Two supernovae have been observed in NGC 5247:

- PSN J13375721-1754272 (Type II-P, mag. 15.6) was discovered by the Catalina Real-time Transient Survey on 24 July 2012.
- SN 2016C (Type II-P, mag. 15.7) was discovered by Masakatsu Aoki on 3 January 2016.

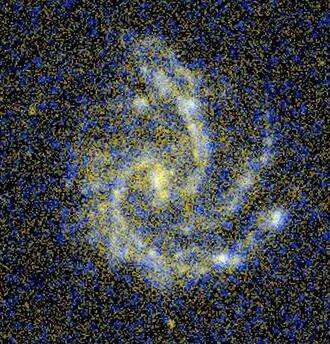
NGC 5247 in ultraviolet by GALEX
