= NGC 3810 =

Spiral galaxy in the constellation Leo

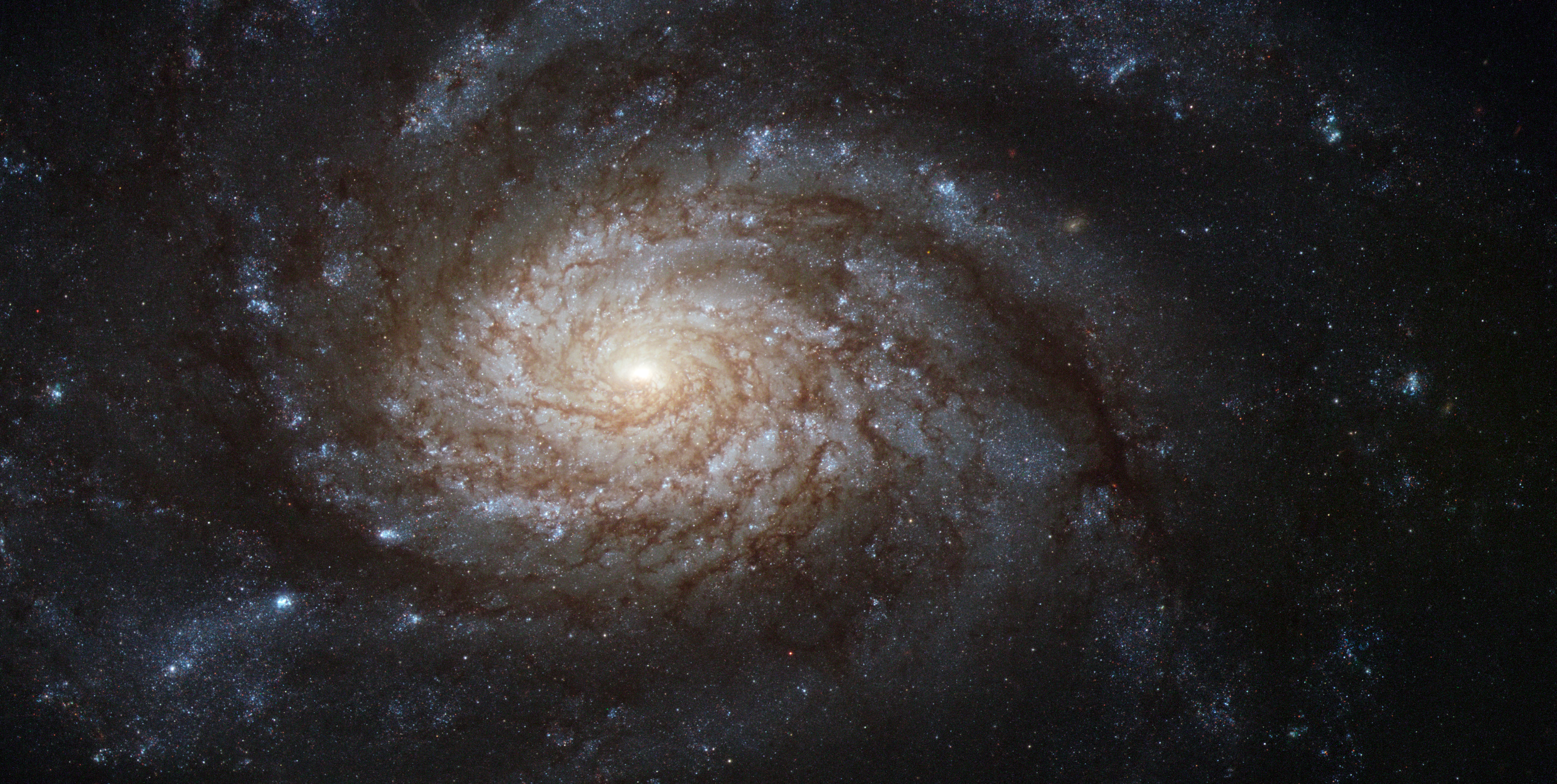
- NGC 3810 imaged by the Hubble Space Telescope

Observation data (J2000 epoch)
- Constellation: Leo
- Right ascension: 11^{h} 40^{m} 58.7659^{s}
- Declination: +11° 28′ 16.371″
- Redshift: 0.003309
- Heliocentric radial velocity: 992 ± 1 km/s
- Distance: 51.2 ± 10.6 Mly (15.7 ± 3.2 Mpc)
- Apparent magnitude (V): 10.6

Characteristics
- Type: SA(rs)c
- Size: ~64,200 ly (19.67 kpc) (estimated)
- Apparent size (V): 4.3′ × 3.0′

Other designations
- IRAS 11383+1144, UGC 6644, MCG +02-30-010, PGC 36243, CGCG 068-024

NGC 3810 is a spiral galaxy located in the constellation Leo. It is about 50 million light years from Earth, and estimated to be about 60,000 light years in diameter. William Herschel discovered it on 15 March 1784.

The bright galaxy NGC 3810 demonstrates spiral structure similar to that of Messier 77. The central part of the galaxy disk is of high surface brightness and features tightly wound spirals. Outside this disk lie more open arms with lower surface brightness. The bright central region is thought to be forming many new stars and is outshining the outer areas of the galaxy by some margin. Further out, the galaxy displays strikingly rich dust clouds along its spiral arms. Hot young blue stars show up in giant clusters far from the centre and the arms are also littered with bright red giant stars.

NGC 3810 forms a small group of galaxies with NGC 3773, the NGC 3810 Group, which is part of the Virgo Supercluster.

== Supernovae ==
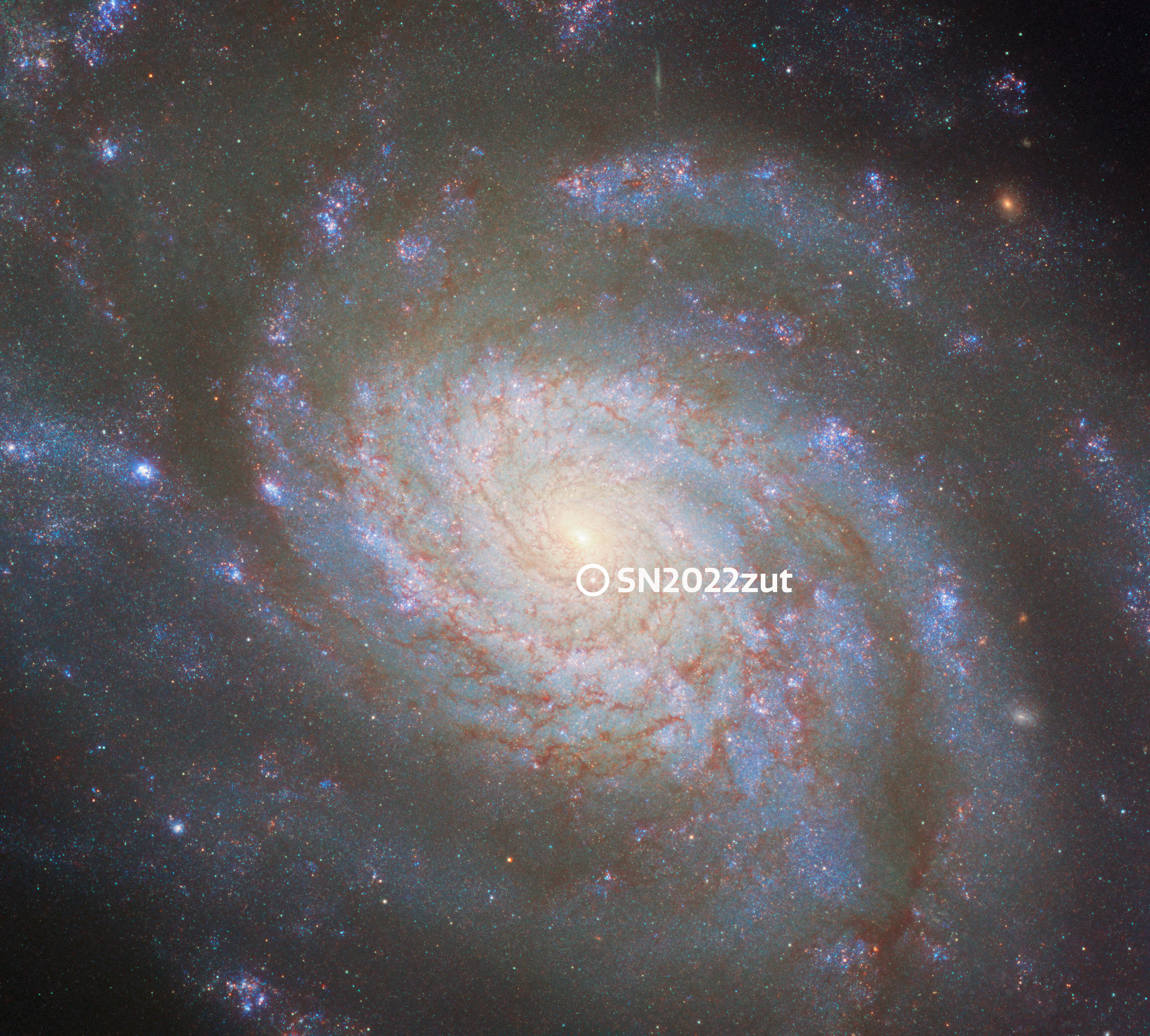
HST image with SN 2022zut marked

Three supernovae have been observed in NGC 3810:

- SN 1997dq (Type Ib, mag. 15) was discovered by Masakatsu Aoki on 2 November 1997.
- SN 2000ew (Type Ic, mag. 14.9) was discovered by Tim Puckett and Alex Langoussis on 28 November 2000.
- SN 2022zut (Type Ia, mag. 14.55) was discovered by ATLAS on 9 November 2022.

== See also ==
- List of NGC objects (3001–4000)

== Gallery ==
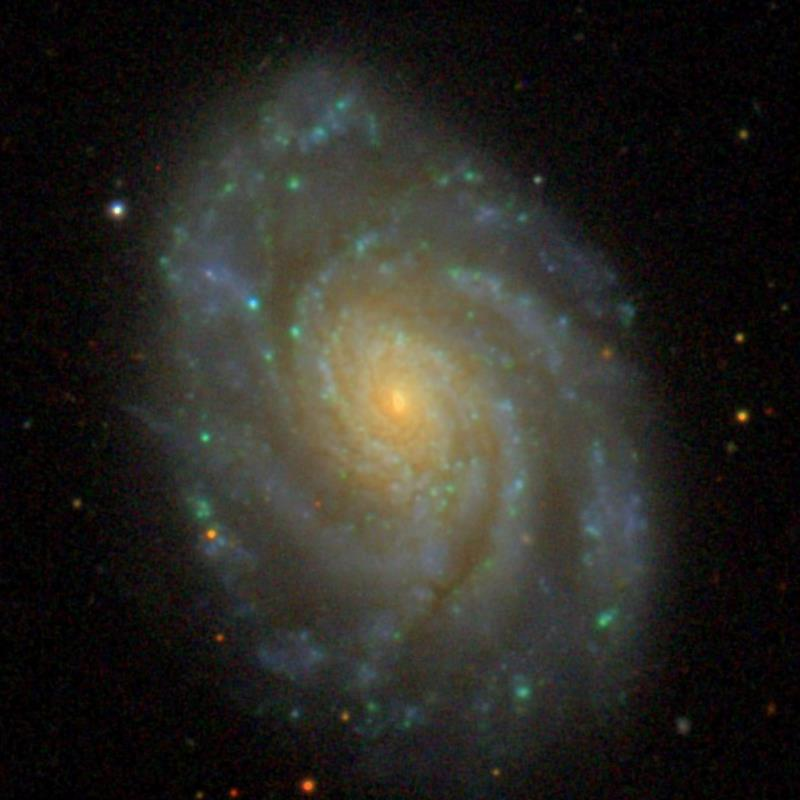
NGC 3810 (SDSS DR14)

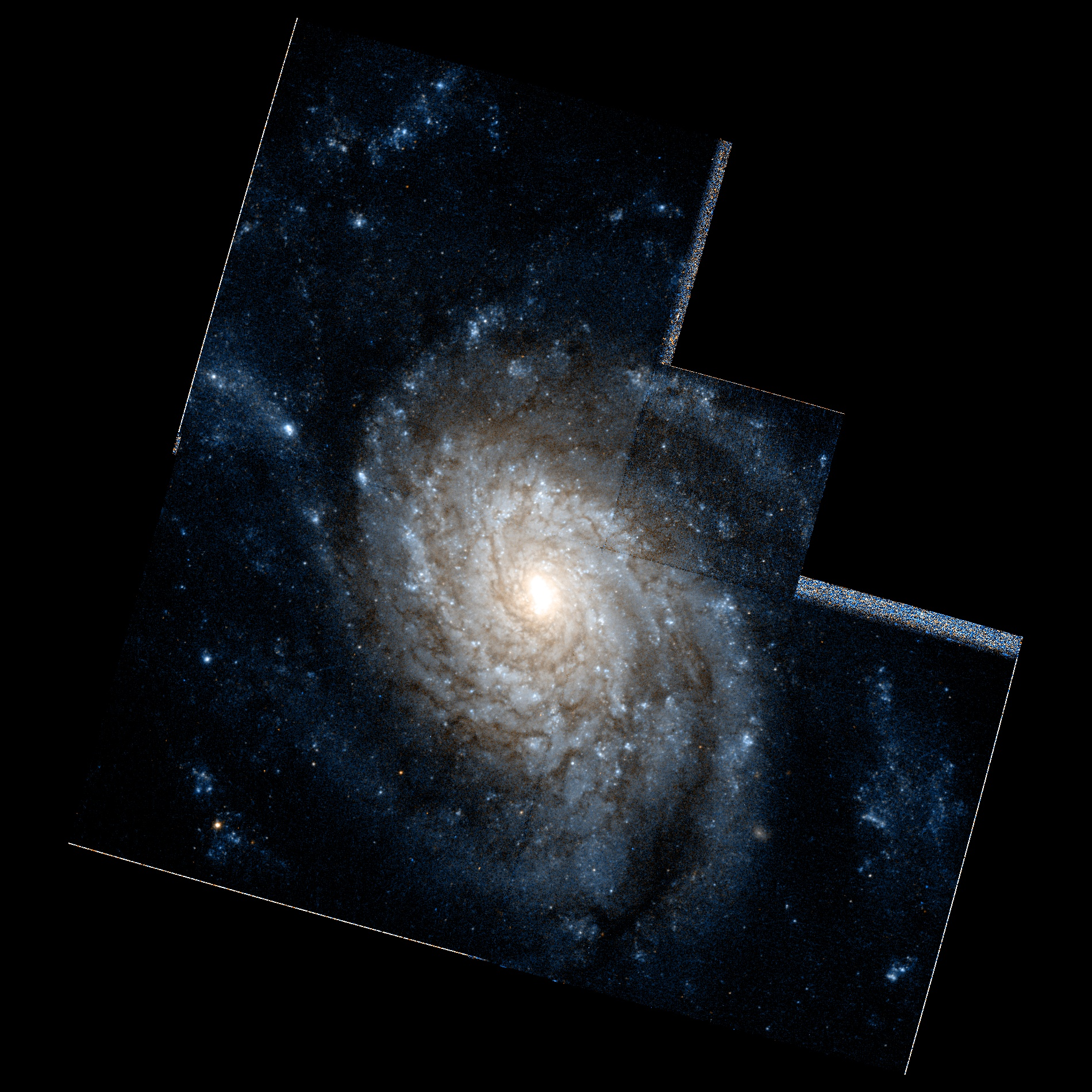
NGC 3810 (HST)
