= NGC 5530 =

Galaxy in the constellation Lupus

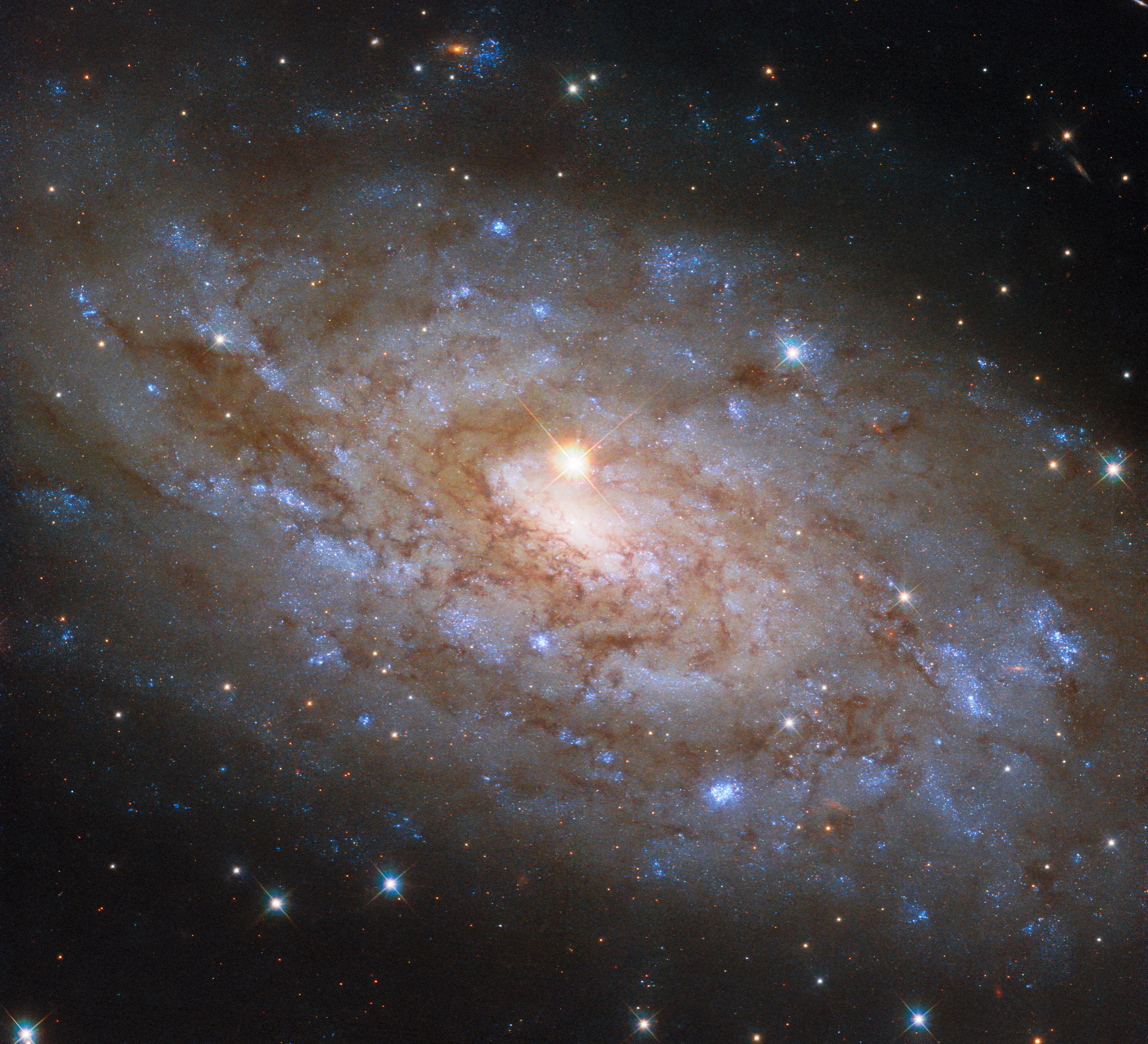
- NGC 5530 imaged by the Hubble Space Telescope

Observation data (J2000 epoch)
- Constellation: Lupus
- Right ascension: 14^{h} 18^{m} 27.30^{s}
- Declination: −43° 23′ 22.0″
- Redshift: 0.003979 ± 0.000007
- Heliocentric radial velocity: 1,193 ± 2 km/s
- Distance: 39.7 ± 4.6 Mly (12.2 ± 1.4 Mpc)
- Apparent magnitude (V): 11.0

Characteristics
- Type: SA(rs)c
- Size: ~74,100 ly (22.72 kpc) (estimated)
- Apparent size (V): 4.2′ × 1.9′

Other designations
- ESO 272- G 003, IRAS 14152-4309, MCG -07-29-013, PGC 51106

NGC 5530 is a spiral galaxy located in the constellation Lupus. It is located at a distance of about 40 million light years from Earth, which, given its apparent dimensions, means that NGC 5530 is about 60,000 light years across. It was discovered by John Herschel on April 7, 1837.

NGC 5530 is a member of the NGC 5643 Group, named after NGC 5643.

== Characteristics ==
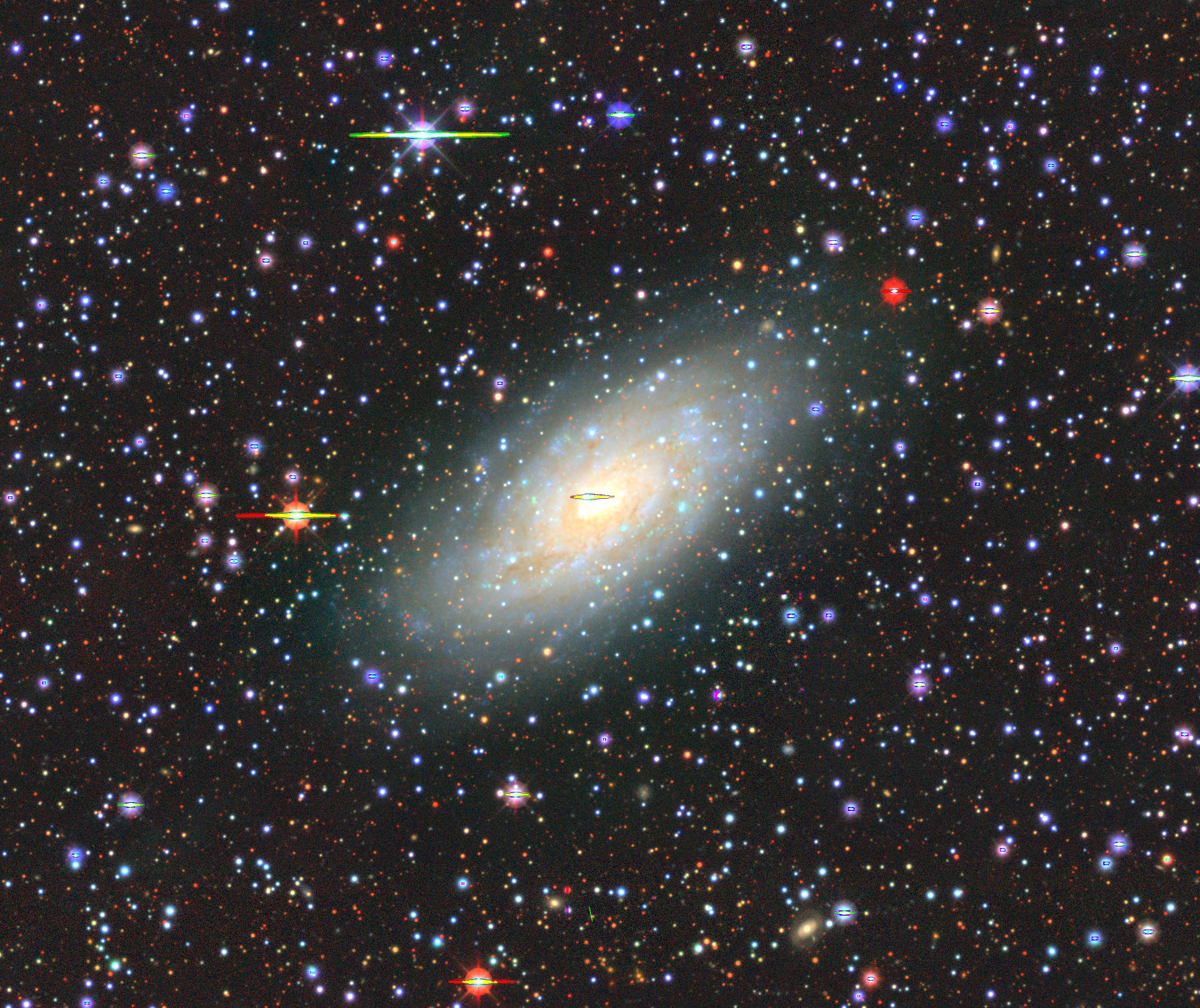
NGC 5530 imaged by Legacy Surveys

NGC 5530 has a flocculent spiral pattern, with multiple spiral arms and spiral fragments with many knots. Dust lanes associated with spiral arms are visible across the disk. The galaxy has a small nucleus with a magnitude 13 field star superimposed. In H-alpha images some faint HII regions are visible, but are hard to distinguish among the starry field. In blue filter the galaxy has an inner pseudoring which has a diameter of 4.6 kpc and accounts for 14% of the total H-alpha emission of the galaxy. The star formation rate of the galaxy is estimated to be 1.0±0.4 M_{☉} based on H-alpha emission. In the nucleus lies a nuclear star cluster which has a radius of 2.6 arcseconds.

== Supernova ==
One supernova has been observed in NGC 5530. SN 2007it was discovered visually by Robert Evans on 13 September 2007 at an apparent magnitude of 13.5, lying 24" west and 25" north of the nucleus. It was determined spectrographically as a young Type II supernova. Further observations lead to its Type IIP categorisation. There are indications that dust was formed during the supernova, as well as of a light echo. The progenitor star had an estimated mass of 16–27 M_{☉}. A search of archival photographs revealed several taken by the All Sky Automated Survey, including one taken on 6 September 2007. In this image, it was magnitude 12, making SN 2007it the brightest supernova of the year 2007.
