= NGC 6753 =

Galaxy in the constellation Pavo

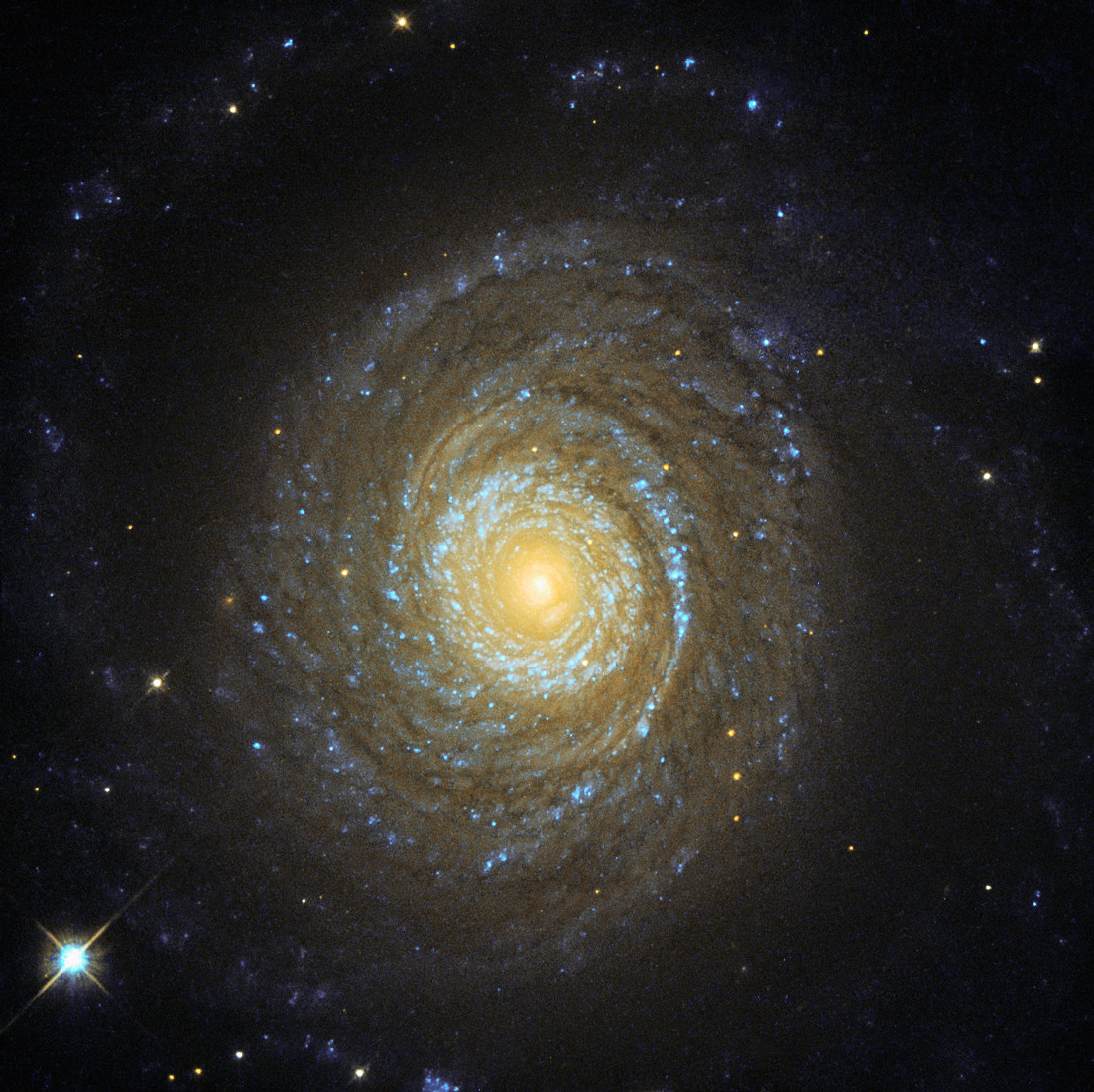
- NGC 6753 imaged by the Hubble Space Telescope

Observation data (J2000 epoch)
- Constellation: Pavo
- Right ascension: 19^{h} 11^{m} 23.635^{s}
- Declination: −57° 02′ 58.44″
- Redshift: 0.010421±0.000087
- Heliocentric radial velocity: 3,140 km/s
- Distance: 142 Mly (43.6 Mpc)
- Apparent magnitude (V): 11.9
- Apparent magnitude (B): 11.84

Characteristics
- Type: (R)SA(r)b
- Mass: ~10^{13} M_{☉}
- Apparent size (V): 2′.4 x 2′.1

Other designations
- NGC 6753, PGC 62870

NGC 6753 is a massive unbarred spiral galaxy, seen almost exactly face-on, in the southern constellation of Pavo. It was discovered by the English astronomer John Herschel on July 5, 1836. The galaxy is located at a distance of 142 million light years from the Milky Way, and is receding with a heliocentric radial velocity of 3,140 km/s. It does not display any indications of a recent interaction with another galaxy or cluster.

The morphological class of NGC 6753 is (R)SA(r)b, indicating it is a spiral without an inner bar feature (SA), displaying outer (R) and inner (r) ring structures, and moderately wound spiral arms. It is being viewed nearly face-on with a galactic plane inclination by 30° to the line of sight from the Earth. The galaxy is flocculent in appearance with a prominent central region. The virial mass of the galaxy is ~1×10^{13} M_{☉}, while the stellar mass is 3.2×10^{11} M_{☉}. It has a star formation rate of 15.5 M_{☉}·yr^{−1}, which is confined to a radius of 15 kpc around the core. The most active region of star formation is the inner ring. It has a hot, X-ray luminous corona that extends out to a radius of 50 kpc.

== Supernovae ==
Three supernovae have been discovered in NGC 6753:

- SN 2000cj was discovered by Robert Evans on May 14, 2000. It was positioned against a spiral arm at an offset 35″ east and 19″ south of the galaxy nucleus. The spectrum showed this to be a Type Ia supernova.
- On May 13, 2005, Type Ic supernovae SN 2005cb was spotted by the Brazilian Supernovae Search team. It was offset 16″ west and 19″ north of the nucleus and reached a peak magnitude of 15.6.
- The Type II-P supernova SN 2019mhm was discovered by the BOSS team on August 2, 2019. This transient was spotted close to maximum with a magnitude of 16.6, but showed no radio emission.

== See also ==
- List of NGC objects (6001–7000)
