= NGC 7722 =

Galaxy in the constellation Pegasus

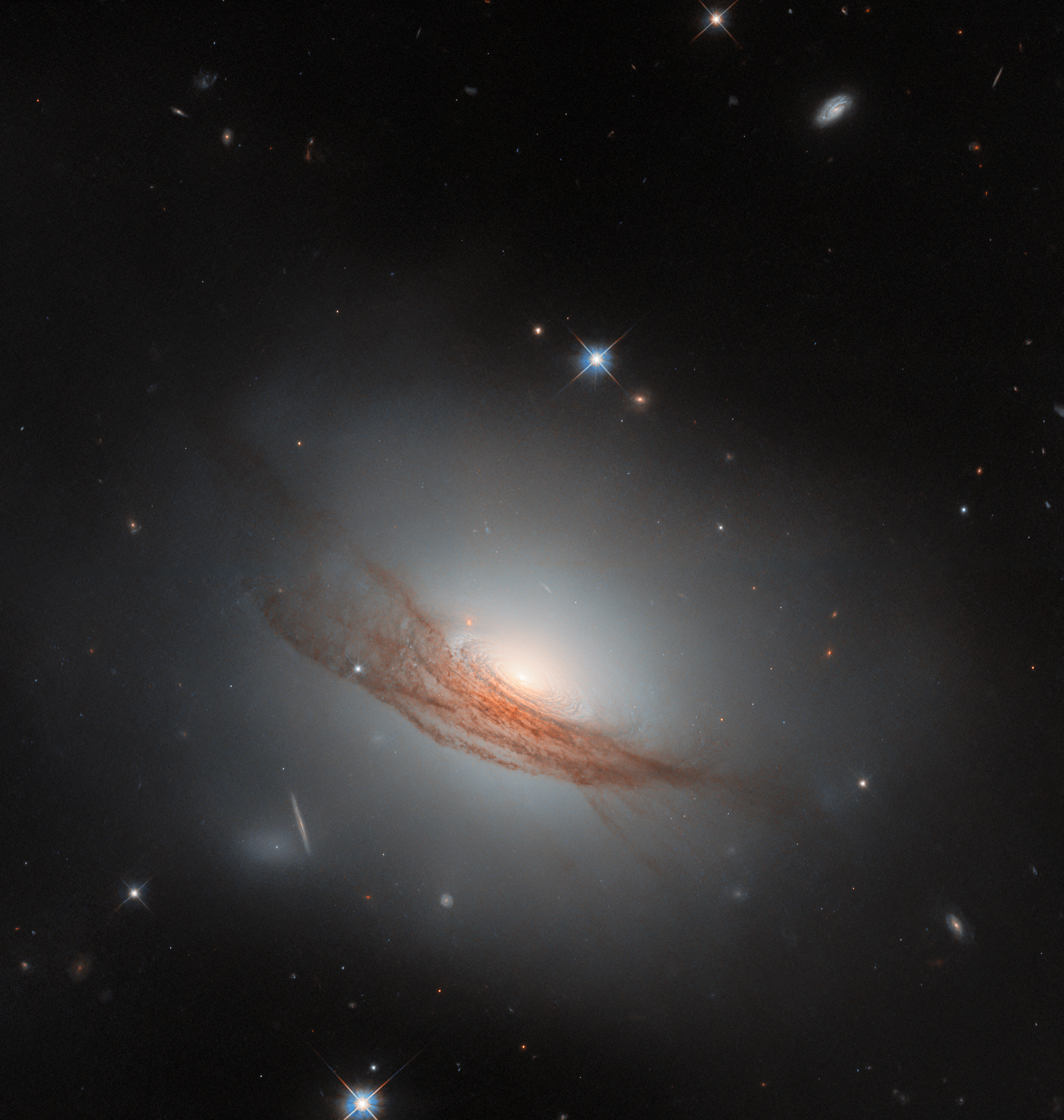
- NGC 7722 imaged by the Hubble Space Telescope

Observation data (J2000 epoch)
- Constellation: Pegasus
- Right ascension: 23^{h} 38^{m} 41.2192^{s}
- Declination: +15° 57′ 17.207″
- Redshift: 0.013353±0.00000667
- Heliocentric radial velocity: 4,003±2 km/s
- Distance: 175.0 ± 12.3 Mly (53.67 ± 3.78 Mpc)
- Group or cluster: NGC 7711 group (LGG 477)
- Apparent magnitude (V): 13.3g

Characteristics
- Type: S0/a
- Size: ~122,600 ly (37.58 kpc) (estimated)
- Apparent size (V): 1.69′ × 1.19′

Other designations
- IRAS 23361+1540, 2MASX J23384119+1557174, UGC 12718, MCG +03-60-017, PGC 71993, CGCG 455-035

NGC 7722 is a lenticular galaxy in the constellation of Pegasus. Its velocity with respect to the cosmic microwave background is 3,639±26 km/s, which corresponds to a Hubble distance of 175.0 ± 12.3 Mly (53.67 ± 3.78 Mpc). It was discovered by German astronomer Heinrich Louis d'Arrest on 12 August 1864.

NGC 7722 is a LINER galaxy, i.e. a galaxy whose nucleus has an emission spectrum characterized by broad lines of weakly ionized atoms.

== NGC 7711 group ==
NGC 7722 is part of the NGC 7711 group (also known as LGG 477). This galaxy group contains seven members, including NGC 7691, NGC 7711, UGC 12633, UGC 12640, UGC 12653, and UGC 12673.

== Supernova ==
One supernova has been observed in NGC 7722:

- SN 2020ssf (Type Ia, mag. 17.94) was discovered by the Zwicky Transient Facility on 6 September 2020.

== See also ==
- List of NGC objects (7001–7840)
