= SN 1992bd =

September 1992 supernova event in the constellation Fornax, inside NGC 1097

- Event type: Supernova, infrared source
- II
- Constellation: Fornax
- Right ascension: 02^{h} 46^{m} 18.89^{s}
- Declination: −30° 16′ 30.0″
- Epoch: J2000.0
- Galactic coordinates: 226.9149 -64.6812
- Distance: 45,000,000 ly
- Redshift: 0.004
- Host: NGC 1097
- Peak apparent magnitude: +15
- Other designations: SN 1992bd, 2MASS J02461897-3016289

SN 1992bd was a type II supernova event in NGC 1097, positioned some 1.5″ east and 9″ south of the galactic nucleus. It was discovered by astronomers Chris Smith and Lisa Wells on October 12, 1992. Spectra of the object collected October 17 showed it to have an expansion velocity of 7,500 km/s. Subsequent examination of archival images from the Hubble Space Telescope showed an image of the supernova had been captured on September 20, 1992, 12 days prior to its discovery with ground-based telescopes. The eruption occurred in the circumnuclear star-forming region of the galaxy.

== See also ==
- Spiral Galaxy NGC 1097
