= NGC 2466 =

Galaxy in the constellation Volans

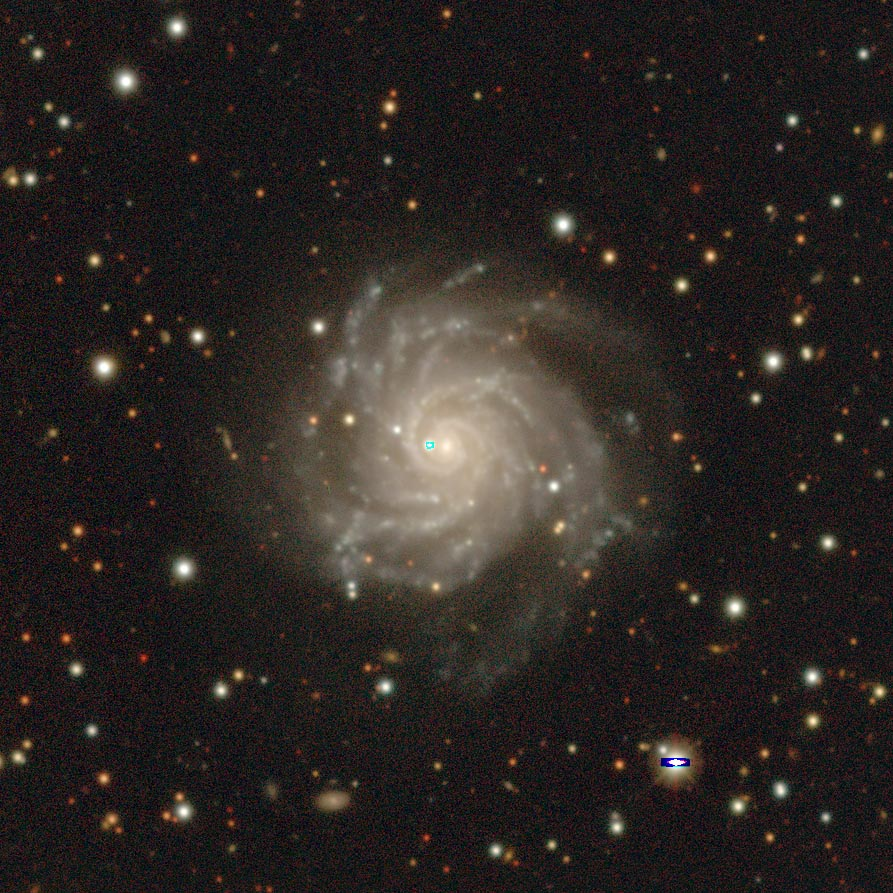
- NGC 2466 imaged by Legacy Surveys

Observation data (J2000 epoch)
- Constellation: Volans
- Right ascension: 07^{h} 45^{m} 15.9175^{s}
- Declination: −71° 24′ 37.252″
- Redshift: 0.017722
- Heliocentric radial velocity: 5313 ± 6 km/s
- Distance: 261.2 ± 18.3 Mly (80.07 ± 5.61 Mpc)
- Apparent magnitude (V): 13.0

Characteristics
- Type: SA(s)c?
- Size: ~ 200,100 ly (61.34 kpc) (estimated)
- Apparent size (V): 1.6′ × 1.4′

Other designations
- ESO 059- G 018, IRAS 07456-7117, 2MASX J07451596-7124376, MCG +06-08-003, PGC 21714, CGCG 524-065

NGC 2466 is an unbarred spiral galaxy in the constellation of Volans. Its velocity with respect to the cosmic microwave background is 5428 ± 10 km/s, which corresponds to a Hubble distance of 261.2 ± 18.3 Mly (80.07 ± 5.61 Mpc). The galaxy was discovered by British astronomer John Herschel on 20 February 1835.

== Supernovae ==
Three supernovae have been observed in NGC 2466:

- South African amateur astronomer Berto Monard discovered SN 2003gh (Type Ia, mag. 15.7) on 29 June 2003.
- ASASSN-14dd (Type Ibn, mag. 15.6) was discovered by the All Sky Automated Survey for SuperNovae on 24 June 2014.
- SN 2016iye (Type IIb, mag. 17.4) was discovered by Stuart Parker on 19 December 2016.

== See also ==
- List of NGC objects (2001–3000)
