= NGC 2305 =

Galaxy in the constellation Volans

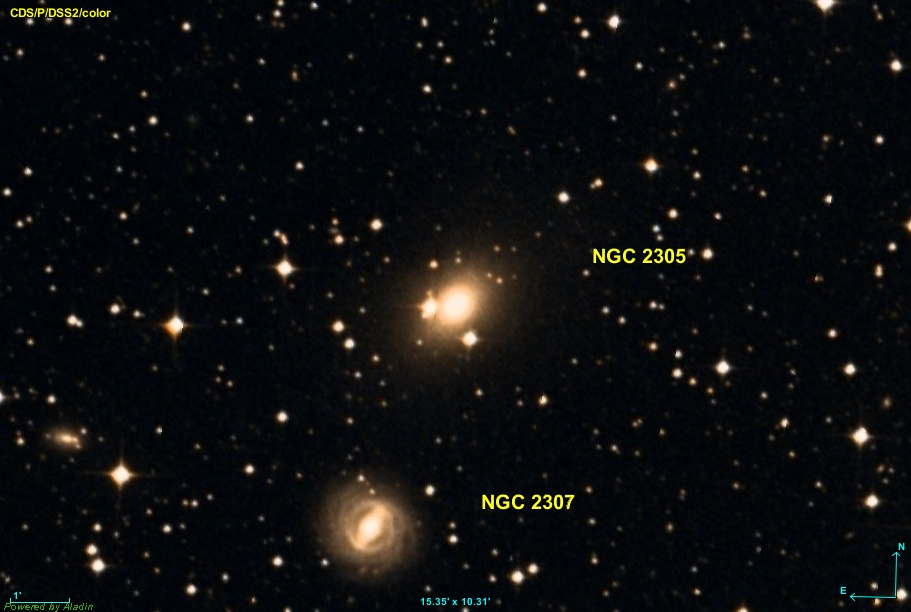
- NGC 2305 (center) with NGC 2307 (below) imaged by SDSS

Observation data (J2000 epoch)
- Constellation: Volans
- Right ascension: 06^{h} 48^{m} 37.2674^{s}
- Declination: −64° 16′ 23.848″
- Redshift: 0.011671
- Heliocentric radial velocity: 3499 ± 20 km/s
- Distance: 173.4 ± 12.2 Mly (53.17 ± 3.75 Mpc)
- Group or cluster: RR 143
- Apparent magnitude (V): 11.7

Characteristics
- Type: E2: pec
- Size: ~188,200 ly (57.71 kpc) (estimated)
- Apparent size (V): 2.1′ × 1.5′

Other designations
- 2MASX J06483729-6416240, PGC 19641, ESO 087- G 044

NGC 2305 is an elliptical galaxy in the constellation of Volans. Its velocity with respect to the cosmic microwave background is 3605 ± 21 km/s, which corresponds to a Hubble distance of 53.17 ± 3.75 Mpc (~174 million light-years). It was discovered by British astronomer John Herschel on 30 November 1834.

The galaxy NGC 2305 forms a physical pair with NGC 2307, collectively named RR 143, with a distance of at least 51 kpc between the galaxies.

== Supernovae ==
Two supernovae have been observed in NGC 2305:

- SN 2011fn (Type I, mag 17.9) was discovered by Stu Parker on 29 June 2011. There is some uncertainty about this supernova; it was classified as either Type Ia or Type Ic, and it is possible that the host galaxy of this supernova was not NGC 2305, but instead the nearby galaxy 2MASS J06483060-6415588.
- SN 2023txv (Type Ia, mag 17.409) was discovered by ATLAS on 3 October 2023.

== See also ==
- List of NGC objects (2001–3000)
