= SN 1999eu =

1999 supernova event in the constellation Fornax, inside NGC 1097

- Event type: Supernova
- SN
- Discovered: 5 November 1999
- Constellation: Fornax
- Right ascension: 02^{h} 46^{m} 20.79^{s}
- Declination: -30° 19' 06.1"
- Epoch: J2000.0
- Galactic coordinates: 227.0163 -64.6743
- Distance: 45 Mly
- Remnant: IIP
- Host: NGC 1097
- Peak apparent magnitude: 17.3
- Other designations: SN 1999eu, AAVSO 0242-30

SN 1999eu was a Type IIP supernova that happened in NGC 1097, a barred spiral galaxy about 45 million light years away, in the constellation Fornax. It was discovered 5 November 1999, possibly three months after its initial brightening, and is unusually under-luminous for a Type II supernova.
