= Masakatsu Aoki =

Japanese astronomer

Asteroids discovered: 2
(16769) 1996 UN1	29 October 1996
58627 Rieko	8 November 1997
Supernovae discovered: 13
SN 1996an	28 July 1996
SN 1996aq	17 August 1996
SN 1996ca	15 December 1996
SN 1996cb	16 December 1996
SN 1997X	2 February 1997
SN 1997dd	20 August 1997
SN 1997dq	3 November 1997
SN 1997eg	3 November 1997
SN 1997ei	24 December 1997
SN 1999eu	24 December 1997
SN 2000db	6 August 2000
SN 2000di	23 August 2000
SN 2016C	3 January 2016

Masakatsu Aoki (青木 昌勝, Aoki Masakatsu; born 1957, Toyama Prefecture) is a Japanese amateur astronomer who operates from his private Aoki Astronomical Observatory (908) at Toyama, Toyama Prefecture, Japan.

His main interest lies in supernovae of which he has discovered a total of 13, such a SN 1999eu as well as SN 2000db and SN 2000di. In 2016, he discovered the supernova SN 2016C in NGC 5247. In the course of his search, he has also discovered two asteroids during 1996–1997. He has named the asteroid 58627 Rieko in honour of his wife.
