= SN 2006X =

Supernova on February 4, 2006

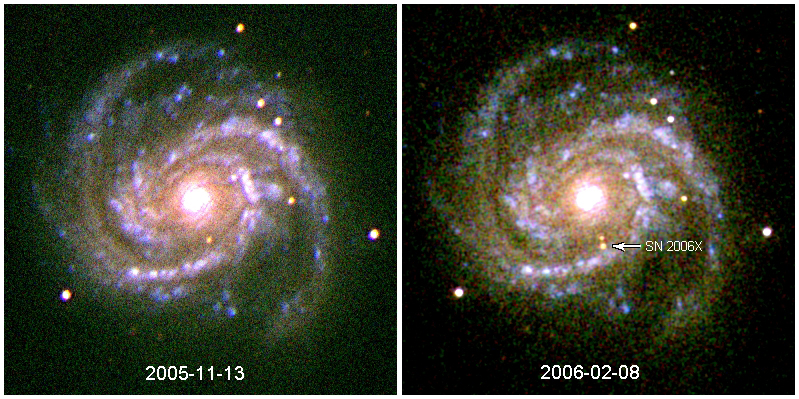
- M100 before and after the supernova explosion
- Event type: Supernova
- Ia
- Date: February 4, 2006
- Constellation: Coma Berenices
- Right ascension: 12^{h} 22^{m} 53.92^{s}
- Declination: +15° 48′ 31.2″
- Epoch: B1950.0
- Distance: 65 mly
- Redshift: 0.0036, 0.007, 0.0067, 0.0071, 0.0068, 0.0037, 0.0043
- Host: M100
- Peak apparent magnitude: +13
- Other designations: SN 2006X
- Related media on Commons

SN 2006X was a Type Ia supernova about 65 million light-years away in Messier 100, a spiral galaxy in the constellation Coma Berenices. The supernova was independently discovered in early February 2006 by Shoji Suzuki of Japan and Marco Migliardi of Italy.

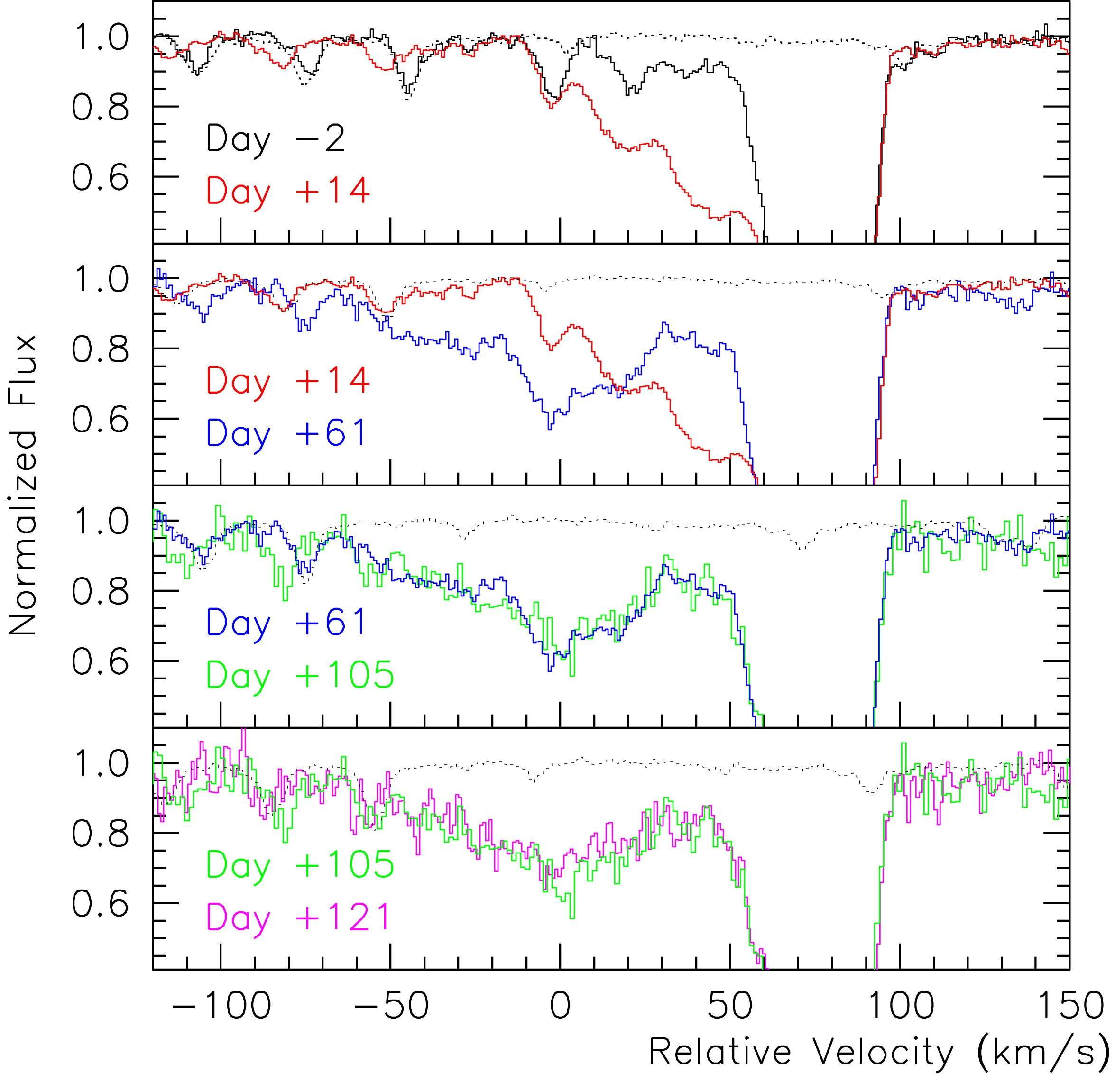
Evolution of the Sodium line in the spectrum of SN 2006X as a function of time.

SN 2006X is particularly significant because it is a Type Ia supernova. These supernovae are used for measuring distances, so observations of these supernovae in nearby galaxies are needed for calibration. SN 2006X is located in a well-studied galaxy, and it was discovered two weeks before its peak brightness, so it may be extraordinarily useful for understanding supernovae and for calibrating supernovae for distance measurements. It may even be possible to identify the progenitor of this supernova.
