= Backyard Observatory Supernova Search =

Group of amateur astronomers searching for supernovae

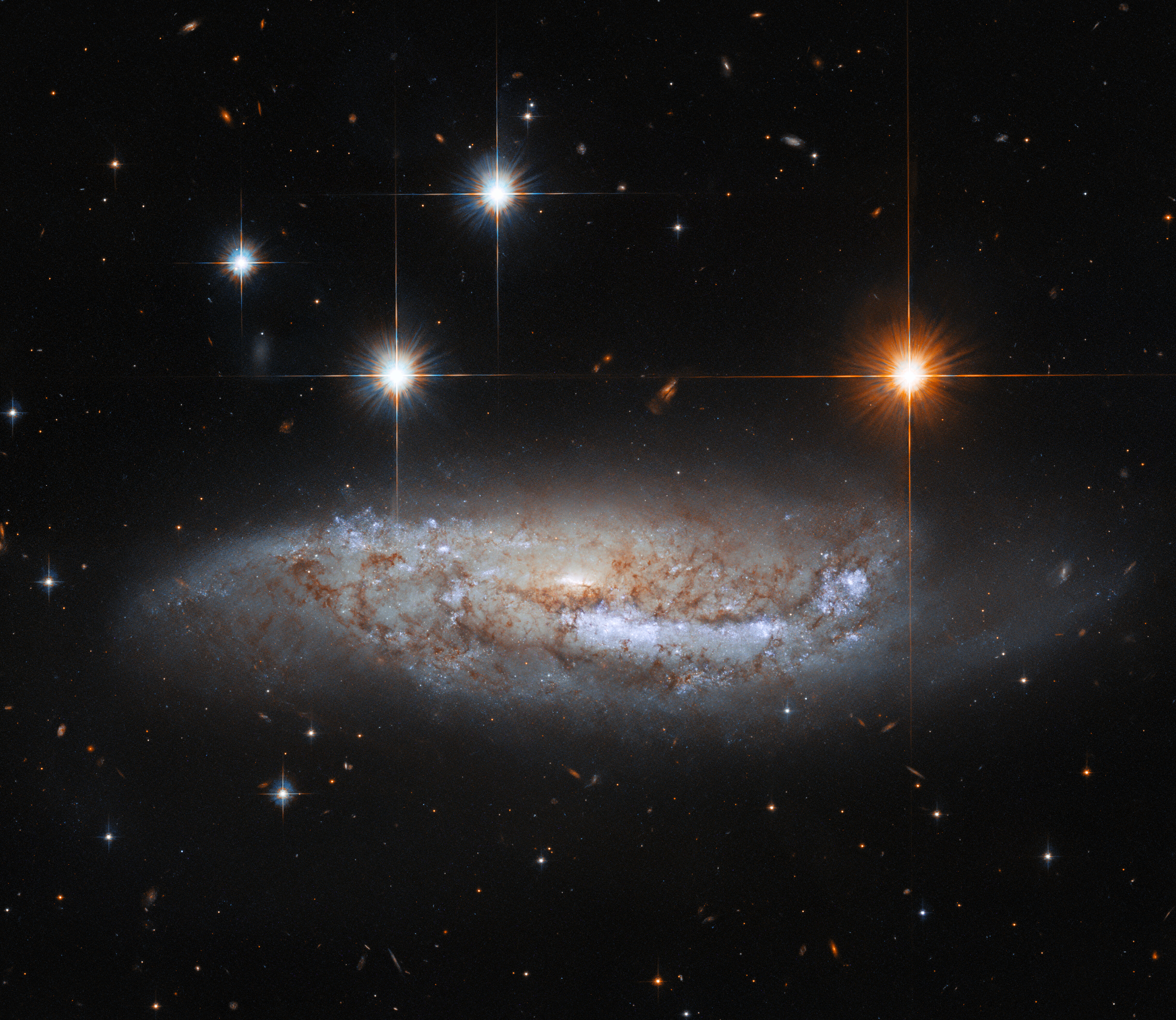
NGC3568 - Supernova discovered by the BOSS team

The Backyard Observatory Supernova Search (BOSS) is conducted by astronomers from Australia and New Zealand since mid 2008 to search for new supernovae in the southern hemisphere. In 2022 the group won the Astronomical Society of Australia's Page Medal for having found around 200 confirmed supernovas.

== List of discoveries ==
SN Name	Host Galaxy	Date	Magnitude
AT 2021xtf	PGC 64029	2021-09-03	16.8
AT 2021skl	ESO 297-G16	2021-06-25	16.7
SN 2021Itk	IC 4367	2021-05-21	17.6
AT 2021gfp	ESO 42-G14	2021-03-18	18.8
AT 2020kbv	ESO 184-G64	2020-05-16	18.5
AT 2020jvs	NGC 642	2020-05-13	15.9
SN 2020cdr	ESO 119-13	2020-02-09	17.3
SN 2019mhm	NGC 6753	2019-08-02	16.6
SN 2019icv	IC 5186	2019-06-24	16
SN 2019has	PGC 133907	2019-06-07	15.9
SN 2019hsa	NGC 7038	2018-11-01	16.0
AT 2018hmy	ESO 124-G-18	2018-10-21	16.8
SN 2018ecf	PGC 50325	2018-07-23	16.5
SN 2018dfg	NGC 5468	2018-07-10	17.8
SN 2018ctw	ESO 297-G-36	2018-06-21	17.4
SN 2018bta	ESO 101-G-20	2018-05-17	16.4
SN 2018bbv	ESO 68-G-13	2018-04-25	17.1
AT 2018bbl	NGC 7421	2018-04-24	17.4
AT 2018vv	ESO 158-G-7	2018-02-08	18
SN 2017ixh	NGC 2297	2017-12-15	17
SN 2017hxt	PGC 128734	2017-11-08	17.1
SN 2017hbj	ESO 084-G-021	2017-10-03	16
SN 2017ggw	ESO 246-G-21	2017-08-22	17.9
AT 2017fus	ESO 464-G12	2017-07-29	18
AT 2017fqz	ESO 267-IG-041	2017-07-25	16.5
SN 2017ezd	ESO 339-G-009	2017-06-17	16.9
AT 2017ewu	ESO 104-G-003	2017-06-19	17.7
AT 2017ewt	IC 2103	2017-06-20	16.8
AT 2017eoc	ESO 215-G-037	2017-06-08	17.1
AT 2017dgg	NGC 1500	2017-04-21	17.9
SN 2016adj	NGC 5128	2016-02-08	14
AT 2015cr	ESO 596-G-10	2015-07-19	18
AT 2017cet	NGC 922	2017-03-15	16.2
SN 2017caw	PGC 22822	2017-03-08	18.0
SN 2017bzc	NGC 7552	2017-03-07	12.8
SN 2017bzb	NGC 7424	2017-03-07	13.0
SN 2017acd	PGC 612475	2017-02-02	17.3
SN 2017iye	NGC 2466	2016-12-19	17.4
AT 2017iro	ESO 200-G-054	2016-12-03	18.5
