= Meeus =

Meeus may refer to:

== People ==
- Ferdinand de Meeûs (1798–1861), Belgian banker, businessman and politician
- Jean Meeus (born 1928), Belgian meteorologist and amateur astronomer
- Jean Meeus (ice hockey), Belgian ice hockey player
- Jordi Meeus (born 1998), Belgian cyclist
- Leonardo Meeus, Belgian economist
- Roy Meeus (born 1989), Belgian football player
- Meeus van Dis (born 1978), Dutch Artist

== Places ==
- Meeûs Square, Belgium

== Other ==
- 2213 Meeus, main belt asteroid
- Meeûs d'Argenteuil family
- Meeùs, Dutch corporation
