= Robert Evans (astronomer) =

Australian minister and amateur astronomer

Robert Owen Evans
- Born: February 20, 1937; Sydney, Australia
- Died: November 8, 2022 (aged 85); Springwood, New South Wales
- Education: University of Sydney

Robert Owen Evans, OAM (20 February 1937 – 8 November 2022) was an Australian minister of the Uniting Church in Hazelbrook, New South Wales, and an amateur astronomer who holds the record for visual discoveries of supernovae (42). He also co-discovered C/1996 J1 (Evans–Drinkwater), his only comet alongside Michael J. Drinkwater, on 10 May 1997.

== Ministry ==
Evans was born on 20 February 1937 in Sydney, Australia. He graduated from the University of Sydney, majoring in philosophy and modern history. Coming from a religious family, Evans trained to become a Methodist minister and was ordained by the New South Wales Conference in 1967. He served as a circuit minister until his retirement in 1998. He wrote a number of books on the history of evangelism.

== Supernova search ==
Evans took up supernova hunting around 1955, but his first adequate instrument, a 10-inch (25 cm) Newtonian telescope was assembled only in around 1968. He made his first official supernova discovery in 1981 and found nine more before using larger telescopes. While living in Coonabarabran, New South Wales, he used his own 16 inch (40 cm) telescope. From early 1995 to mid-1997 he also had limited access to the Siding Spring 40-inch (1.0 m) Telescope at Siding Spring Observatory (he was allocated about 110 nights, half of which were suitable for observing), resulting in about 10,000 galaxy observations, another three visual supernovae discoveries and an additional four supernovae spotted on photographs made at the observatory.

By 2001, he had made 33 visual discoveries and by the end of 2005, despite the increasing competition from automated telescopes, the total number had already increased to 40 visual supernova discoveries plus one comet. In 2005, Evans relied almost exclusively on his 31 cm Dobsonian. He reported 6,814 galaxy observations in a period of 107 hours and 30 minutes, spread out over 77 nights. During that time, he found four supernovae; three had already been discovered by others, the fourth was SN 2005df, which was Evans's third supernova discovery in NGC 1559 (after SN 1984J and SN 1986L) and his 40th visual discovery.

In an interview, Evans reported that he was able "to observe 50 galaxies an hour when they were scattered around the sky, and 120 galaxies an hour in Virgo". Only in the 1990s did automated telescopes come into use which offered a comparable speed – like the Katzman Automatic Imaging Telescope. Evans also features prominently in Bill Bryson's A Short History of Nearly Everything which quotes him as saying "There's something satisfying, I think, about the idea of light travelling for millions of years through space and just at the right moment as it reaches Earth someone looks at the right bit of sky and sees it. It just seems right that an event of that magnitude should be witnessed." Supernova 1983N, spotted by Evans in 1983 in the galaxy M83 long before it reached its peak, turned out to be the first discovery of a new type of supernova, later named Type Ib.

In 2005, Evans resigned from being the chairman of the AAVSO Supernovae Search Committee after serving in that position for two decades.

Evans lived in Hazelbrook, Australia where he wrote books. Meanwhile, he continued his supernova hunting using a 12-inch (31 cm) reflecting telescope from his back porch. The bulky 16-inch (410 mm) telescope fell into disuse since his home in Hazelbrook did not accommodate a permanent installation in the back yard.

== Research in evangelical revivals ==
Robert Evans wrote and published books on the history of evangelism in the 19th and 20th centuries under his imprint Research in Evangelical Revivals.

== Awards ==
- In 1985 he received, with Gregg Thompson, the Amateur Achievement Award of the Astronomical Society of the Pacific for his observations of supernovae.
- In 1986 he received the Berenice and Arthur Page Award from the Astronomical Society of Australia for visual discoveries of supernovae.
- The American Association of Variable Star Observers has awarded him their Nova/Supernova Award on fifteen separate occasions.
- He was awarded the Centenary Medal of the Société astronomique de France.
- He was an honorary member of the Royal Astronomical Society of Canada.
- He was a member of the International Astronomical Union, and the Astronomical Society of Australia.
- He received the Medal of the Order of Australia (OAM) in 1988 for his contributions to science.
- In 1996 the Astronomical Society of New South Wales awarded Evans their most prestigious honour, the McNiven Medal.

== List of supernova discoveries ==
=== Visual ===
- SN 1981A in NGC 1532. Type II.
- SN 1981D in NGC 1316. Type Ia.
- SN 1983G in NGC 4753. Type Ia.
- SN 1983N in NGC 5236. (M83.) Prototype of Type Ib.
- SN 1983S in NGC 1448. Type II.
- SN 1983V in NGC 1365. Type Ic.
- SN 1984E in NGC 3169. Type II.
- SN 1984J in NGC 1559. Type II.
- SN 1984L in NGC 991. Prototype of Type Ib.
- SN 1984N in NGC 7184. Type I.
- SN 1985P in NGC 1433. Type II
- SN 1986A in NGC 3367. Type Ia.
- SN 1986G in NGC 5128. (Cen A.) Type Ia.
- SN 1986L in NGC 1559. Type II.
- SN 1987B in NGC 5850. Type II.
- SN 1987N in NGC 7606. Type Ia.
- SN 1988A in NGC 4579. (M58.) Type II.
- SN 1989B in NGC 3627. (M66.) Type Ia.
- SN 1990K in NGC 150. Type II.
- SN 1990M in NGC 5493. Type Ia.
- SN 1990W in NGC 6221. Type Ic.
- SN 1991T in NGC 4527. Type Ia
- SN 1991X in NGC 4902. Type Ia.
- SN 1992ad in NGC 4411B Type II.
- SN 1992ba in NGC 2082. Type II.
- SN 1993L in IC 5270. Type Ia.
- SN 1995G in NGC 1643. Type II.
- SN 1995V in NGC 1087. Type II.
- SN 1995ad in NGC 2139. Type II.
- SN 1996X in NGC 5061. Type Ia.
- SN 1996al in NGC 7689. Type II.
- SN 1997bp in NGC 4680. Type Ia.
- SN 2000cj in NGC 6753. Type Ia.
- SN 2001du in NGC 1365. Type II.
- SN 2001ig in NGC 7424. Type IIb.
- SN 2003B in NGC 1097. Type II.
- SN 2003gd in NGC 628 (M74.) Type II.
- SN 2003gs in NGC 936 Type Ia.
- SN 2003hn in NGC 1448 Type II.
- SN 2005df in NGC 1559 Type Ia.
- SN 2007it in NGC 5530 Type II.
- SN 2008aw in NGC 4939 Type II.

=== Photographic ===
- SN 1988ai in ESO 293g34. (found in 2002.)
- SN 1996A. anonymous galaxy. Type II.
- SN 1996O. MCG +03- 41- 115. Type Ia.
- SN 1996ad. anonymous galaxy.
- SN 1996as. anonymous galaxy. Type II

== Books by Robert Evans ==
- Evans, Robert (1993). An Evangelical World-View Philosophy
- Evans, Robert (Compiled and edited 1996, 2007). An Outline History of Evangelical Revivals in the Pacific Islands and in Papua New Guinea
- Evans, Robert & McKenzie, Roy (1999). Evangelical Revivals in New Zealand
- Evans, Robert (2000, 2007). Early Evangelical Revivals in Australia (2nd Ed.)
- Evans, Robert (2005). Evangelism and Revivals in Australia, 1880 to 1914 (First volume)
- Evans, Robert (2005). Fire From Heaven: A Description and Analysis of the Revivals of the 'Burned-Over District' of Upstate New York, 1800-1840, and Spiritual Deceptions
- Evans, Robert (2007). Emilia Baeyertz - Evangelist: Her Career in Australia and Great Britain
- Evans, Robert (2007). Thomas Cook - British Evangelist in Australia and New Zealand in 1894 and 1895
- Evans, Robert (2010). Evangelisation Society of Australasia 1883 to 1918
- Evans, Robert (2011). Evangelisation Society of Australasia 1919 to 1945
- Evans, Robert & McKenzie, Roy (2012). Duncan Wright - Evangelist in New Zealand
- Evans, Robert (2014). Sister Francis as an Evangelist
- Evans, Robert (2014). The Later Ministry of Dr. J. Edwin Orr
- Evans, Robert (2014). The Spiritual Impact of the Religious Tract Society
- Evans, Robert (2014). The Truth about Jedediah Burchard?
- Evans, Robert (2015). The American Evangelical Philosophy of Civilization 1735 to 1905

Awards and achievements
Preceded by Russell Merle Genet	Amateur Achievement Award of Astronomical Society of the Pacific (together with Gregg Thompson); 1985	Succeeded by Jean Meeus
