= NGC 3367 =

Spiral galaxy in the constellation Leo

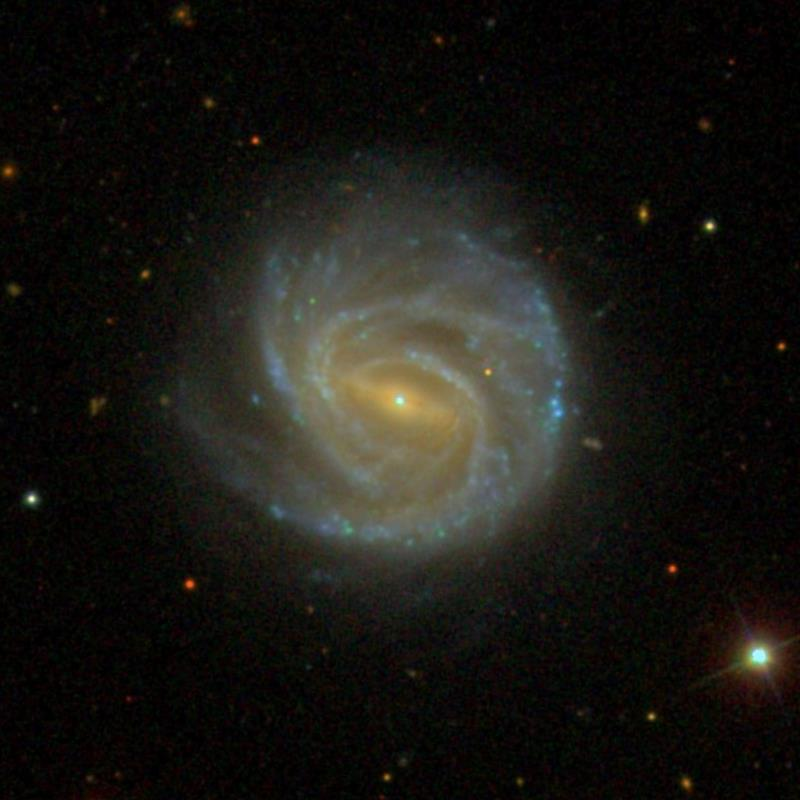
- NGC 3367 imaged by SDSS

Observation data (J2000 epoch)
- Constellation: Leo
- Right ascension: 10^{h} 46^{m} 35.0^{s}
- Declination: +13° 45′ 03″
- Redshift: 0.010142 +/- 0.000024
- Heliocentric radial velocity: 3040 ± 7 km/s
- Distance: 113 ± 22 Mly (34.8 ± 6.7 Mpc)
- Apparent magnitude (V): 11.4

Characteristics
- Type: SB(rs)c
- Size: 30 kpc (97,800 ly) (diameter; D_{25} isophote)
- Apparent size (V): 2.5′ × 2.4′

Other designations
- UGC 5880, CGCG 066-011, MCG +02-28-005, 4C 14.37, PGC 32178

NGC 3367 is a barred spiral galaxy located in the constellation Leo. It is located at a distance of about 120 million light years from Earth, which, given its apparent dimensions, means that NGC 3367 is about 98,000 light years across. It was discovered by German-British astronomer William Herschel on March 19, 1784.

== Characteristics ==
NGC 3367 is a barred spiral galaxy with an asymmetric shape seen nearly face-on, with an inclination of 25 degrees. The inner arms begin at the ends of the bar, forming a ring with a major axis of 0.9 arcseconds, and after half of a revolution start to branch, creating a multiple-arm structure. They are studded with many bright HII regions. The star formation rate in NGC 3367 is nearly 3 M_{☉} per year. The outer arms form a semi-circular arch towards the south, at a distance of 50 arcseconds from the centre, more visible in the ultraviolet.

Usually, asymmetry in a galaxy is caused by interaction with other galaxies, but no large satellite has been detected near NGC 3367. The cause of the asymmetry is assumed to be a minor merger or mass accretion that took place in the last billion years. Because no low surface brightness structures, like plumes and star streams, have been detected near NGC 3367, and nor is gas seen in HI imaging near the galaxy, it is believed that the galaxy accreted cold gas in the past million years. This gas accretion resulted in increased star formation and nuclear activity.

NGC 3367 features a strong bar. The bar pattern speed was estimated to be 43 ± 6 km s^{−1} kpc^{−1} using the Tremaine-Weinberg method. The bar of the galaxy is more prominent in the near infrared, suggesting the dominance of an old population of stars in that region. There is also a knot at the eastern end of the bar, where there is a non-negligible population of red giants and asymptotic giant branch stars.

=== Nucleus ===
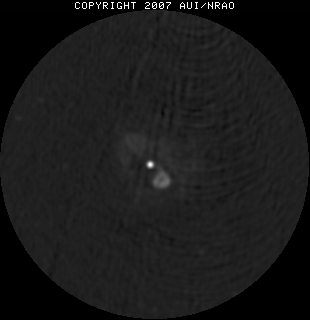
NGC 3367 in radio waves by the Very Large Array.

NGC 3367 has been categorised as a HII region or a type 2 Seyfert galaxy. However, optically there is no hint of an active galactic nucleus (AGN). The spectrum of NGC 3367 features unusually broad lines (FWHM of 490 m/s for Hβ) and a blue asymmetry. The spectrum looks like one produced from Wolf-Rayet stars. There is no clear evidence of H-alpha emission. The spectrum is also dominated by starburst features like low [Fe II] 1.2567 μm/Paβ line ratio. The galaxy was observed by the Spitzer Space Telescope and [Ne v] 14.3 and 24.3 μm lines, consistent with the existence of a weak AGN were detected. Observed by the XMM-Newton telescope, the galaxy's X-ray luminosity in 2-10 keV was 2.0 × 10^{40} erg s−1 dominated by a power law. This value is consistent with low-luminosity AGNs.

When observed in radio waves, the galaxy features two radio lobes extending from a nuclear source, a feature common to Seyfert 2 galaxies. The emission of the southwest lobe is polarised, indicating it is above the plain of the disk, while the northeast is depolarised. The southwest lobe extends 26" from the nucleus and the northeast 33". The total extent of the source is approximately 12 kpc at the distance of the galaxy. More detailed observations by the Very Large Array revealed a radio jet connecting the nucleus with the southwest lobe and a circumnuclear structure with a radius of nearly 300 pc.

In the centre of the galaxy lies a supermassive black hole whose mass is estimated to be 15×10^{6} (10^{7.2}) M_{☉} based on Ks bulge luminosity. The X-ray spectra of the galaxy suggested the mass of the supermassive black hole to be in the range of 10^{5} to 10^{7} M_{☉}.

Around the nucleus, at a radius of circa 2 arcseconds, has been detected using CO(1-0) emission a significant amount of molecular gas. The total mass of molecular gas in that region is estimated to be 3×10^{8} M_{☉} and in the central 5 arcseconds the mass of molecular gas is 5.9×10^{8} M_{☉}. The presence of such a large mass could obscure the optical emission lines from an active galactic nucleus. The CO emission has an elongated shape, maybe due to the forces created by the stellar bar.

== Supernovae ==
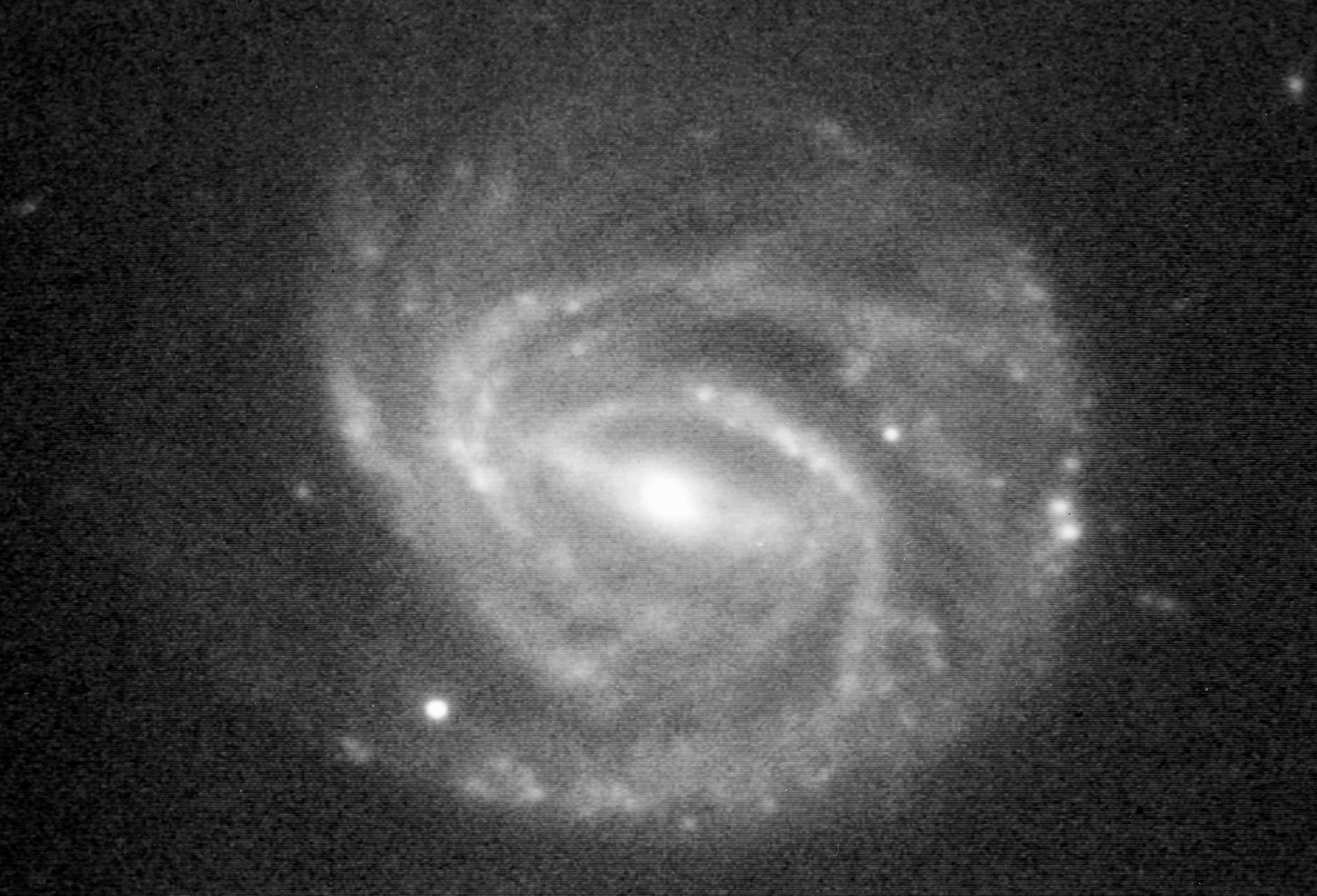
NGC 3367 with SN 1992C by ESO

Six supernovae have been observed in NGC 3367:

- SN 1986A (Type Ia, mag 14.0) was discovered by Robert Evans on 4 February 1986, near the condensations in the spiral arms east of the centre of the galaxy. It was also discovered independently by L. Cameron and B. Leibundgut on 4 February 1986, and by Miklós Lovas on 6 February 1986.
- SN 1992C (Type II, mag. 16.5) was discovered by ESO astronomer Hans van Winckel on 28 January 1992. He found it on a photographic plate obtained by Guido Pizarro during a search programme carried out with the ESO 1-metre Schmidt telescope at La Silla. Spectra of the supernova, obtained by Della Valle and Christoffel Waelkens (Astronomical Institute of Leuven, Belgium), with the 2.2-metre telescope at La Silla, showed it to be of Type II and that the explosion must have happened between 10 and 20 days earlier. The expansion velocity was measured at about 7000 km/sec. SN 1992c was located southeast of the centre of the galaxy, at the tip of a spiral arm.
- SN 2003aa (Type Ic, mag. 17.6) was discovered by LOTOSS (Lick Observatory and Tenagra Observatory Supernova Searches) on 31 January 2003.
- SN 2007am (Type II, mag. 17.8) was discovered by LOSS (Lick Observatory Supernova Search) on 11 March 2007.
- SN 2018kp (Type Ia, mag. 19.9) was discovered by Nikolay Mishevskiy on behalf of the Catalina Real-time Transient Survey on 24 January 2018.
- SN 2022ewj (Type II, mag. 16.3) was discovered by Kōichi Itagaki on 19 March 2022.

== Nearby galaxies ==
NGC 3367 is the foremost member in a galaxy group known as the NGC 3367 group or LGG 216. Other members of the group include NGC 3391, NGC 3419A and NGC 3419. A bit further away lie the galaxies NGC 3300, and NGC 3306. NGC 3367 lies in the same region of the sky as the Leo Group, whose redshift is about a third of NGC 3367. NGC 3377, a member of the Leo Group, lies 22 arcminutes to the north of NGC 3367.
