= NGC 4902 =

Galaxy in the constellation Virgo

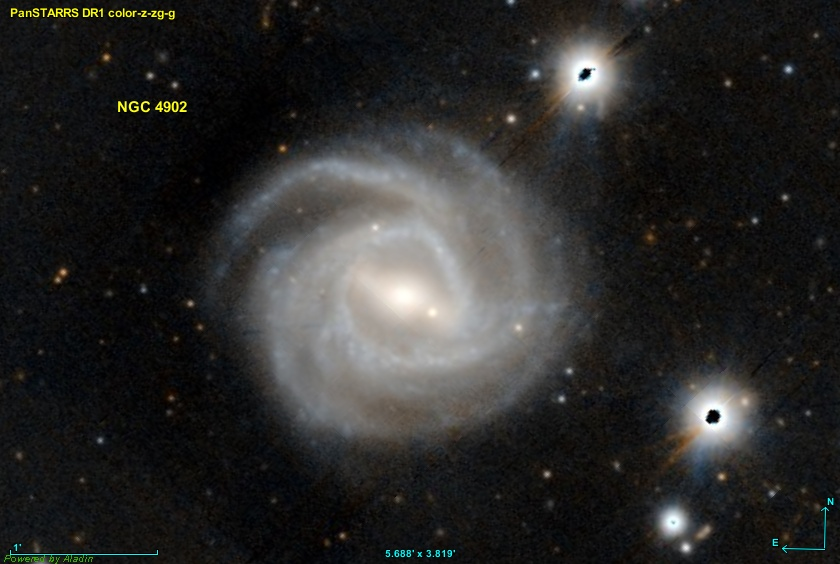
- NGC 4902 imaged by PanSTARRS

Observation data (J2000 epoch)
- Constellation: Virgo
- Right ascension: 13^{h} 00^{m} 59.7585^{s}
- Declination: −14° 30′ 48.673″
- Redshift: 0.008756 ± 0.000017
- Heliocentric radial velocity: 2,625 ± 5 km/s
- Distance: 110 ± 11.4 Mly (33.8 ± 3.5 Mpc)
- Group or cluster: NGC 4902 Group
- Apparent magnitude (V): 10.9

Characteristics
- Type: SB(r)b
- Size: ~97,000 ly (29.7 kpc) (estimated)
- Apparent size (V): 3.0′ × 2.7′

Other designations
- IRAS 12583-1414, UGCA 315, MCG -02-33-092, PGC 44847

NGC 4902 is a barred spiral galaxy in the constellation Virgo. The galaxy lies about 110 million light years away from Earth, which means, given its apparent dimensions, that NGC 4902 is approximately 100,000 light years across. It was discovered by German-British astronomer William Herschel on February 8, 1785.

== Characteristics ==
NGC 4902 has a prominent bar. There is a brighter stellar feature visible on the southwest side of the bar, but it could also be superimposed. Two spiral arms emerge at the ends of the bar and overlap, forming an inner ring. There is a kink at the north side of the ring. Three spiral arms emanate from the ring, along with a fainter arm. The third arm appears semi-detacted from the inner ring. The arms are diffuse and feature many HII regions. The star formation rate of the galaxy is estimated to be 3.8 M_{☉} per year.

== Supernovae ==
Three supernovae have been observed in NGC 4902:

- SN 1979E (type unknown) was discovered on a photographic plate exposed on 19 August 1979 by M. Wischnjewsky at an apparent magnitude of 16.
- SN 1991X was discovered by Robert Evans on 5 May 1991 at an estimated apparent magnitude of 13.5–14. It was located on the edge of the bar, near the inner ring. It was identified spectrographically as a Type Ia supernova near maximum light.
- SN 2011A was discovered on 4 January 2011 by the CHASE project using the 0.41-m 'PROMPT 4' telescope at Cerro Tololo Inter-American Observatory at an apparent magnitude of 16.9. It was initially classified spectrographically as a Type IIn supernova, however due to its low luminosity and low ejecta velocity has been suggested to be a supernova impostor.

== Nearby galaxies ==
NGC 4902 is the foremost galaxy of a galaxy group known as the NGC 4902 Group. Other members of the group include NGC 4887, NGC 4897, and NGC 4899. NGC 4899 lies 34 arcminutes north of NGC 4902 and NGC 4897 64 arcminutes north. The size of the group is similar to that of the Local Group. It belongs at the same galaxy cloud as NGC 5054, and is part of the Virgo Supercluster, located with in the Virgo II Groups or Virgo Southern Extension.
