= 2213 Meeus =

Main-belt asteroid

Discovery
- Discovered by: E. Delporte
- Discovery site: Uccle Obs.
- Discovery date: 24 September 1935

Designations
- Named after: Jean Meeus (Belgian astronomer)
- Alternative designations: 1935 SO_{1} · 1958 XM; 1961 TG · 1974 RB
- Minor planet category: main-belt · (inner) background · Flora

Orbital characteristics
- Epoch 23 March 2018 (JD 2458200.5)
- Uncertainty parameter 0
- Observation arc: 82.34 yr (30,075 d)
- Aphelion: 2.6972 AU
- Perihelion: 1.6983 AU
- Semi-major axis: 2.1977 AU
- Eccentricity: 0.2273
- Orbital period (sidereal): 3.26 yr (1,190 d)
- Mean anomaly: 126.11°
- Mean motion: 0° 18^{m} 9^{s} / day
- Inclination: 5.3321°
- Longitude of ascending node: 126.93°
- Argument of perihelion: 222.18°

Physical characteristics
- Mean diameter: 4.59±0.28 km 4.889±0.028 km 5.194±0.032 km 5.67 km (calculated)
- Synodic rotation period: 2.651±0.001 h
- Geometric albedo: 0.24 (assumed); 0.3467±0.0219; 0.439±0.042
- Spectral type: S (assumed)
- Absolute magnitude (H): 13.12±0.08; 13.20; 13.34±0.36; 13.4

2213 Meeus, provisional designation 1935 SO_{1}, is a bright background asteroid from the inner regions of the asteroid belt, approximately 5 kilometers (3 miles) in diameter. It was discovered on 24 September 1935, by Belgian astronomer Eugène Delporte at the Royal Observatory of Belgium in Uccle. The presumed S-type asteroid has a short rotation period of 2.65 hours. It was named for Belgian amateur astronomer and meteorologist Jean Meeus.

== Orbit and classification ==
Meeus is a non-family asteroid of the main belt's background population when applying the hierarchical clustering method to its proper orbital elements. Based on osculating Keplerian orbital elements, the asteroid has also been classified as a member of the Flora family (402), a giant asteroid family and the largest family of stony asteroids in the main-belt.

It orbits the Sun in the inner main-belt at a distance of 1.7–2.7 AU once every 3 years and 3 months (1,190 days; semi-major axis of 2.2 AU). Its orbit has an eccentricity of 0.23 and an inclination of 5° with respect to the ecliptic. The body's observation arc begins with its official discovery observation at Uccle in 1935.

== Physical characteristics ==
Meeus is an assumed stony S-type asteroid.

=== Rotation period ===
In August 2013, a rotational lightcurve of Meeus was obtained from photometric observations by Italian astronomers of the Tuscolana Association of Astronomy (D06). Lightcurve analysis gave a rotation period of 2.651 hours with a brightness amplitude of 0.19 magnitude (U=3-).

=== Diameter and albedo ===
According to the survey carried out by the NEOWISE mission of NASA's Wide-field Infrared Survey Explorer, Meeus measures between 4.59 and 5.194 kilometers in diameter and its surface has a high albedo between 0.3467 and 0.439.

The Collaborative Asteroid Lightcurve Link assumes an albedo of 0.24 – derived from 8 Flora, the parent body of the Flora family – and calculates a diameter of 5.67 kilometers based on an absolute magnitude of 13.4.

== Naming ==
This minor planet was named after Belgian amateur astronomer and professional meteorologist Jean Meeus (born 1928), who, in 1986, received the Amateur Achievement Award of the Astronomical Society of the Pacific. The official naming was proposed by Eric S. Fogelin (see 2181), Jay U. Gunter and Edward Bowell, and published by the Minor Planet Center on 1 August 1981 (M.P.C. 6208).
