= NGC 1448 =

Galaxy in the constellation Horologium

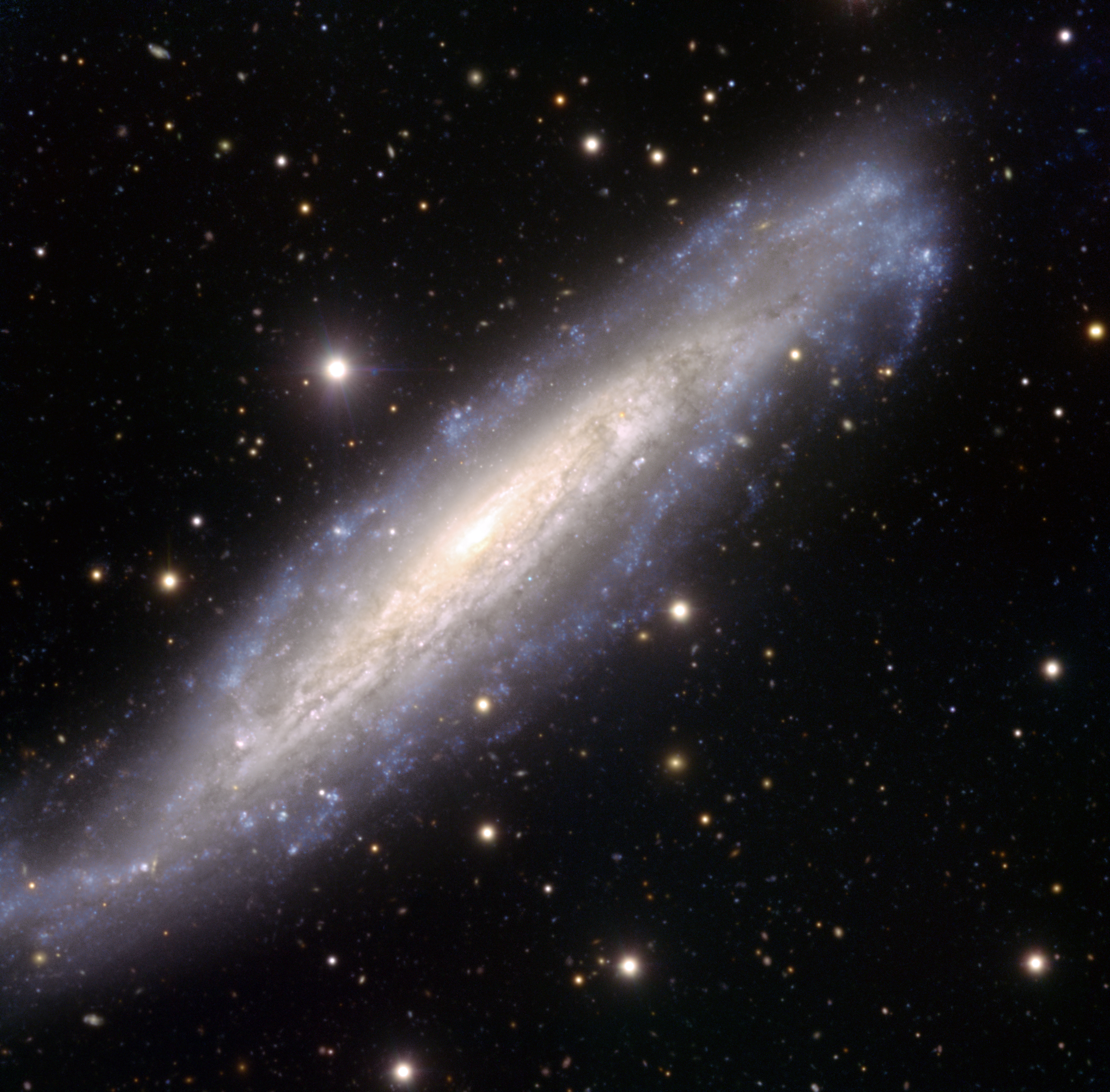
- NGC 1448 by the Very Large Telescope

Observation data (J2000 epoch)
- Constellation: Horologium
- Right ascension: 03^{h} 44^{m} 31.8804^{s}
- Declination: −44° 38′ 41.15″
- Redshift: 0.003896
- Heliocentric radial velocity: 1,168±2 km/s
- Distance: 56.5 ± 7.6 Mly (17.3 ± 2.3 Mpc)
- Apparent magnitude (V): 10.7

Characteristics
- Type: SAcd
- Size: ~142,800 ly (43.78 kpc) (estimated)
- Apparent size (V): 7.6′ × 1.7′

Other designations
- ESO 249- G 016, IRAS 03428-4448, NGC 1457, MCG -07-08-005, PGC 13727

NGC 1448 is an unbarred spiral galaxy seen nearly edge-on in the constellation Horologium. It is at a distance of 55 million light years from Earth. It was discovered by British astronomer John Herschel on 24 October 1835. Herschel observed the galaxy again on 14 December 1835, resulting in it being listed twice in the New General Catalogue, as NGC 1448 and as NGC 1457.

From the spectral analysis of SN 2001el, over a dozen diffuse interstellar bands were discovered in NGC 1448 – one of the few cases that these bands were observed outside of the Milky Way. However, the bands were significantly weaker at SN 2003hn.

In January 2017 it was announced that evidence for a supermassive black hole in NGC 1448 had been found in the center of the galaxy.

== Galaxy Group ==
The galaxy belongs to the NGC 1433 group, part of the Doradus cloud of galaxies.

NGC 1448 is considered to be part of a galaxy group known as LGG 102. It has at least 5 members, which are NGC 1411, PGC 13390, PGC 13409 and IC 1970.

== Supernovae ==
Six supernovae have been observed in NGC 1448:

- SN 1983S (Type II, mag. 14.5) was discovered by Robert Evans on 6 October 1983.
- SN 2001el (Type Ia, mag. 14.5) was discovered by Berto Monard on 17 September 2001. It reached magnitude 12.3, making it the brightest supernova of 2001.
- SN 2003hn (Type II, mag. 14.1) was discovered by Robert Evans on 25 August 2003.
- SN 2014df (Type Ib, mag. 14) was discovered by Berto Monard on 3 June 2014.
- SN 2020zbv (Type IIP, mag. 18.83) was discovered by the Distance Less Than 40 Mpc Survey (DLT40) on 10 November 2020.
- SN 2021pit (Type Ia, mag. 13.5) was discovered by ASAS-SN on 10 June 2021.

== The galaxy in different wavelengths ==
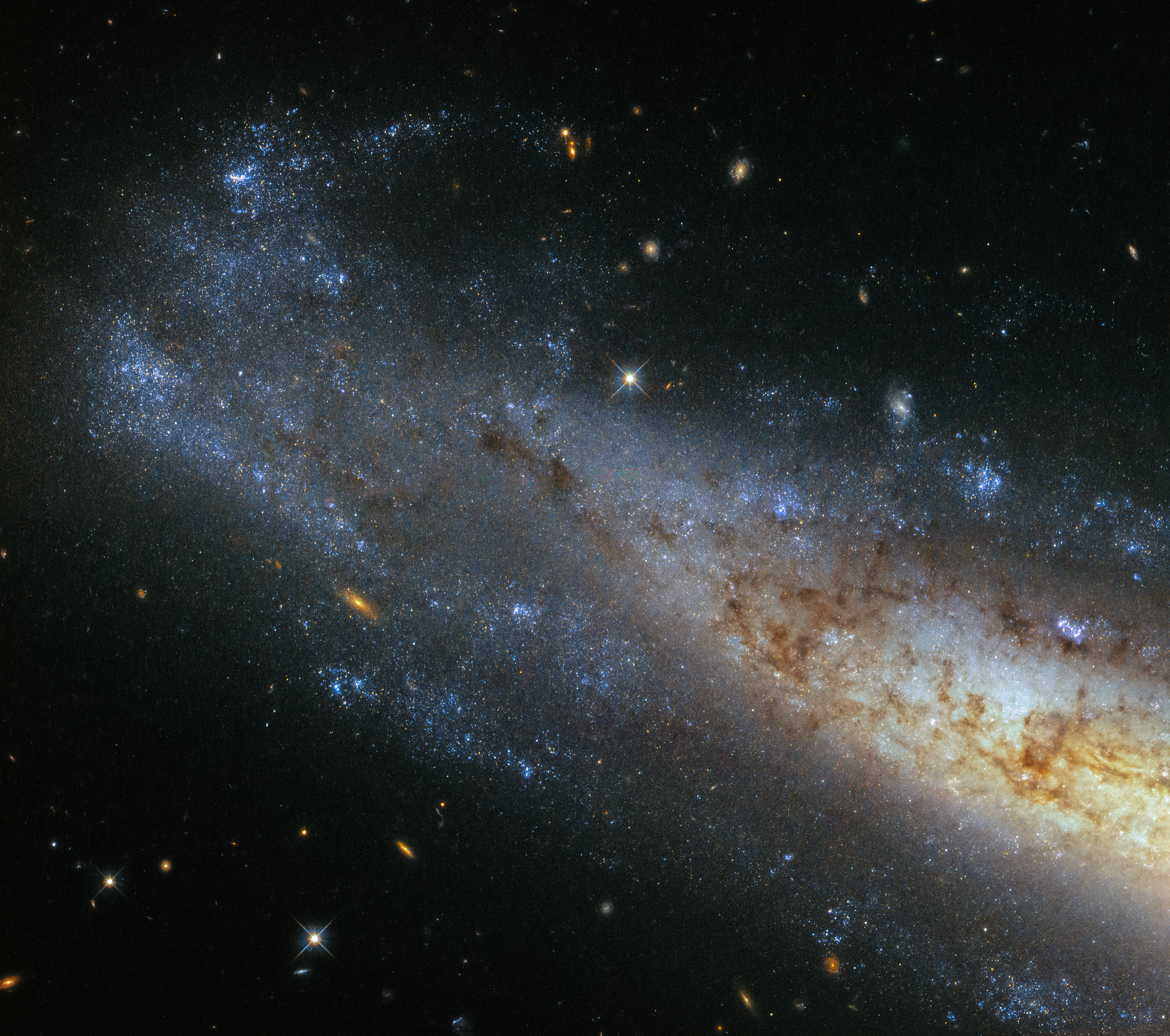
NGC 1448 taken by the Hubble Space Telescope's Wide Field Camera 3.

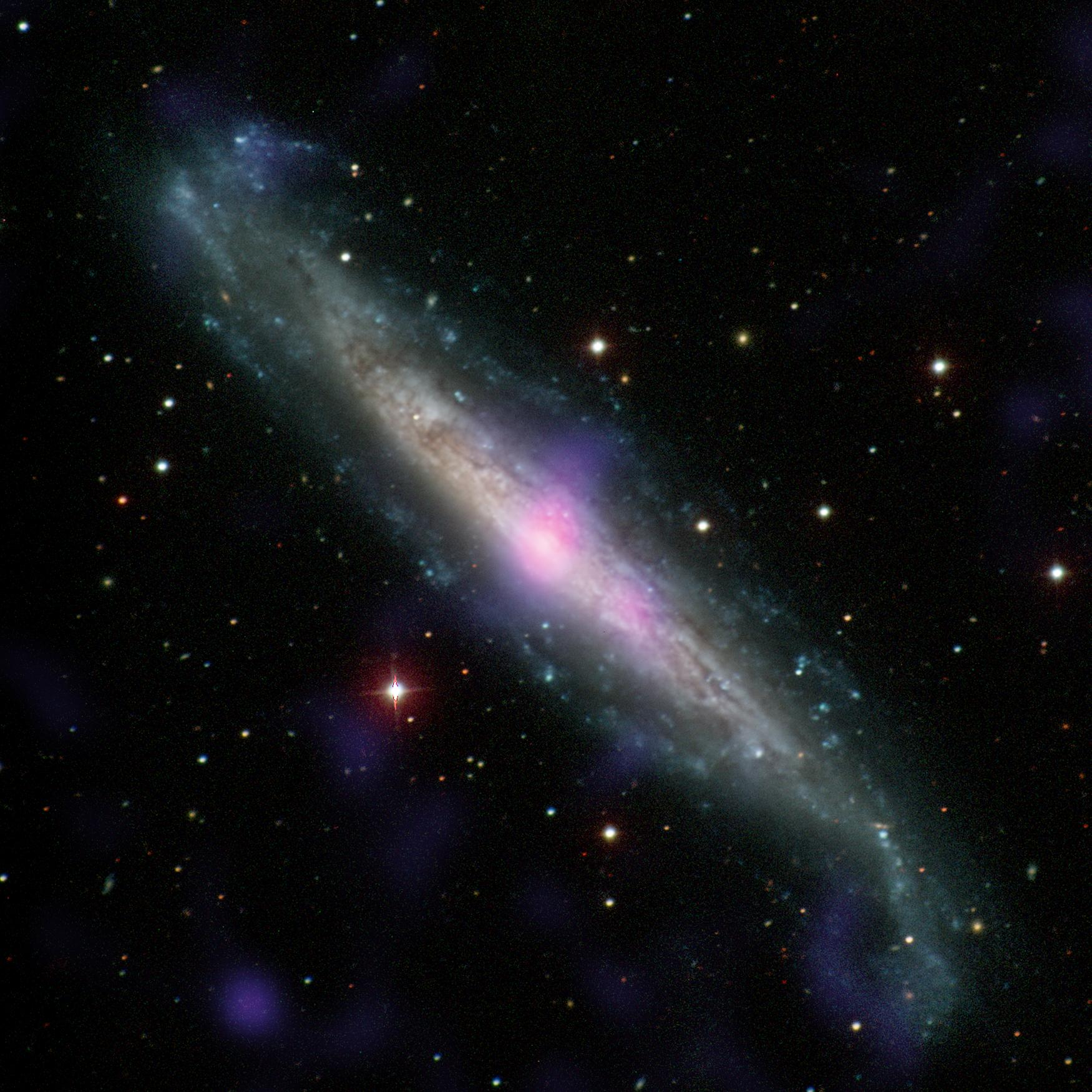
NGC 1448 in optical light and X-rays by NuSTAR and the Chandra X-ray Observatory

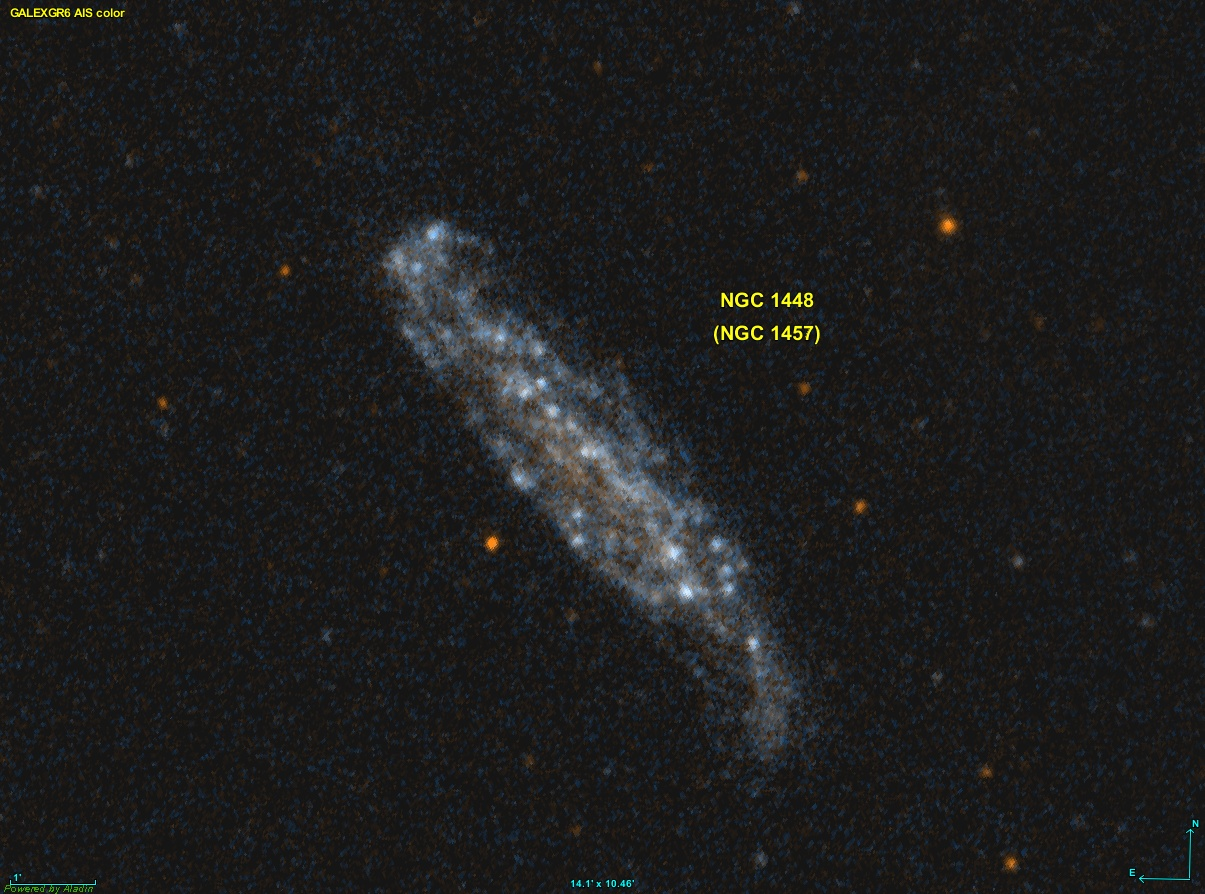
NGC 1448 in ultraviolet by GALEX

== See also ==
- List of NGC objects (1001–2000)
