= Gregg Thompson (astronomer) =

Australian astronomer

Gregg D. Thompson of Brisbane, Australia is an amateur astronomer.

== Astronomy ==
Gregg Thompson was one of the founding members of the Southern Astronomical Society (SAS). Before 1981 he started making a set of charts of bright galaxies, designed to help deep sky observers in their search for extragalactic supernovae. In 1985 he received the Amateur Achievement Award of the Astronomical Society of the Pacific, together with Robert Owen Evans, who had made several supernova discoveries using Thompson's charts. Evans wrote that the number of galaxies he was able to observe grew substantially after the charts were produced. Gregg Thompson also helped verify some of Evans' discoveries.

=== Public outreach ===
In 1990 Gregg Thompson co-authored with James T. Bryan, Jr. the astronomical atlas The Supernova Search Charts and Handbook, containing 248 comparison charts of 345 of the brightest galaxies, highly valued especially by supernova hunters and recommended by the Supernova Search Committee of the American Association of Variable Star Observers. In 1993 he published The Australian Guide to Stargazing, a manual for both naked-eye and telescope observing of the sky of the Southern Hemisphere with explanatory diagrams, photographs and detailed drawings, describing the basics of the night sky observation to novice amateur astronomers.

Preceded by Russell Merle Genet	Amateur Achievement Award of Astronomical Society of the Pacific (together with Robert Evans); 1985	Succeeded by Jean Meeus
