= NGC 1643 =

Galaxy in the constellation Eridanus

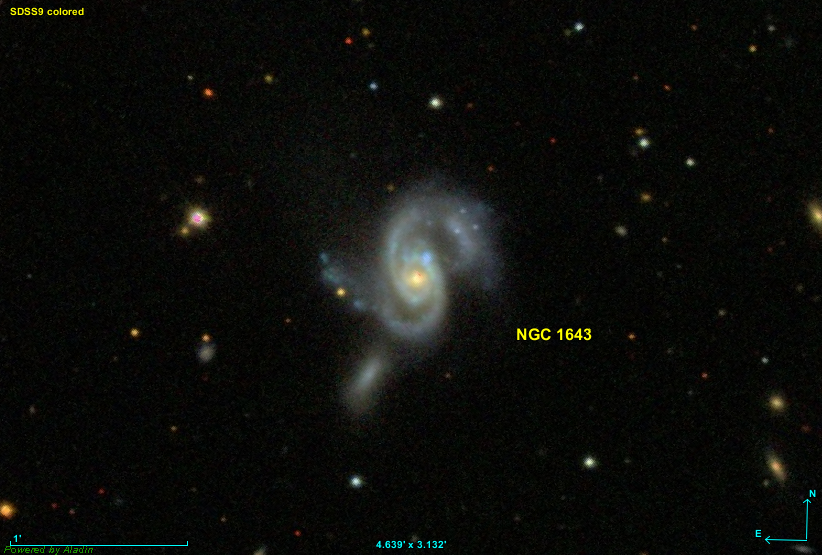
- NGC 1643 imaged by SDSS

Observation data (J2000 epoch)
- Constellation: Eridanus
- Right ascension: 04^{h} 43^{m} 43.9330^{s}
- Declination: −05° 19′ 09.562″
- Redshift: 0.016261±0.00000900
- Heliocentric radial velocity: 4,875±3 km/s
- Distance: 232.5 ± 16.3 Mly (71.30 ± 4.99 Mpc)
- Apparent magnitude (V): 14

Characteristics
- Type: SB(r)bc pec
- Size: ~75,100 ly (23.02 kpc) (estimated)
- Apparent size (V): 1.1′ × 1.1′

Other designations
- IRAS 04412-0524, MCG -01-13-001, PGC 15891

NGC 1643 is a peculiar barred spiral galaxy in the constellation of Eridanus. Its velocity with respect to the cosmic microwave background is 4,834±4 km/s, which corresponds to a Hubble distance of 232.5 ± 16.3 Mly (71.30 ± 4.99 Mpc). It was discovered by German-British astronomer William Herschel on 28 November 1786.

== Supernovae ==
Two supernovae have been observed in NGC 1643:

- SN 1995G (Type IIn, mag. 15.5) was discovered by Robert Evans, J. Shobbrook, and S. Beaman, on 23 February 1995.
- SN 1999et (Type II, mag. 17.6) was discovered by E. Cappellaro on 4 November 1999.

== See also ==
- List of NGC objects (1001–2000)
