= NGC 2139 =

Galaxy in the constellation Lepus

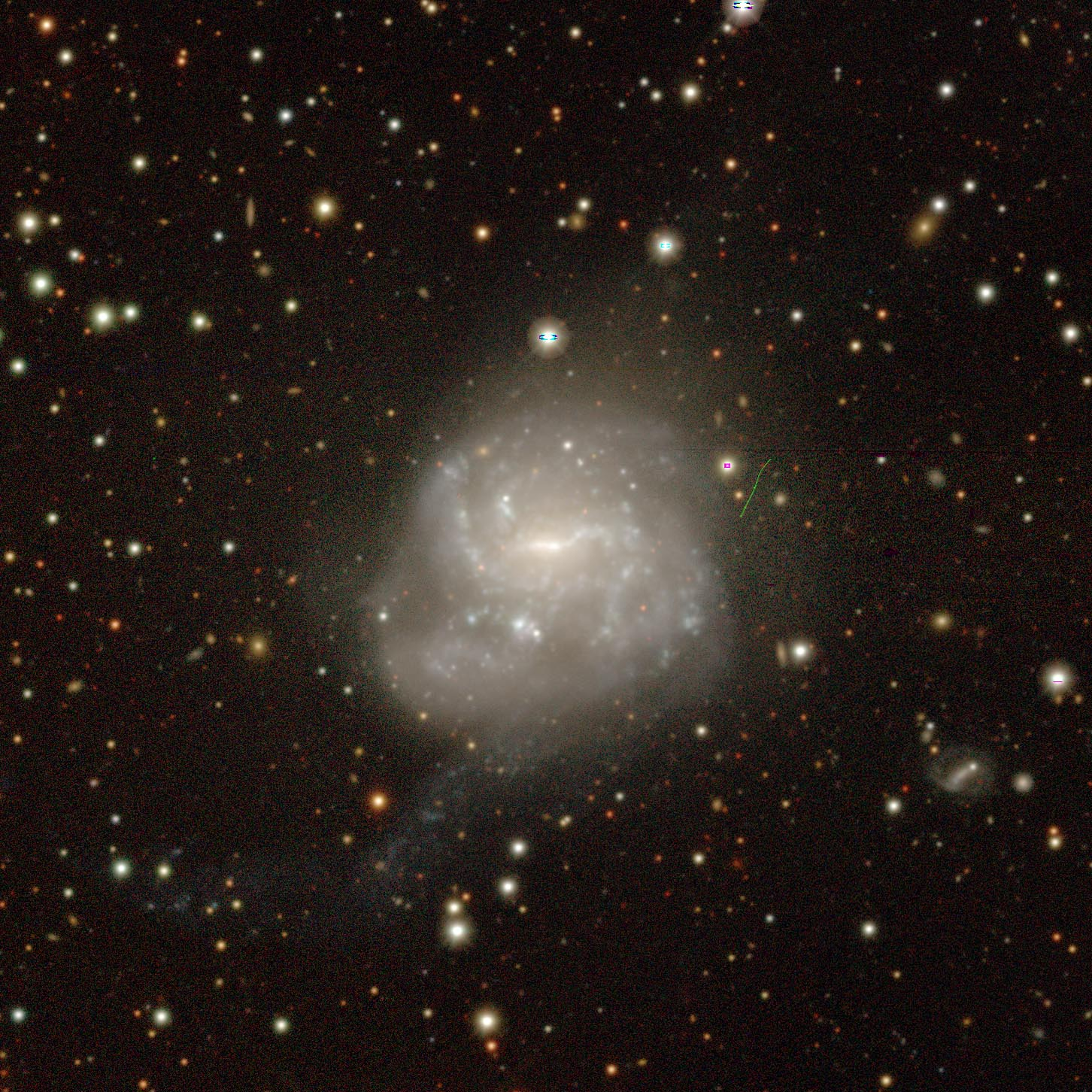
- Legacy Surveys DR10 image of NGC 2139

Observation data (J2000 epoch)
- Constellation: Lepus
- Right ascension: 06^{h} 01^{m} 07.963^{s}
- Declination: −23° 40′ 20.35″
- Redshift: 0.006148±0.000017
- Heliocentric radial velocity: 1,836 km/s
- Galactocentric velocity: 1,649 km/s
- Distance: 120.6 Mly (36.98 Mpc)
- Apparent magnitude (V): 11.6
- Apparent magnitude (B): 11.98

Characteristics
- Type: SAB(rs)cd
- Number of stars: 9.1×10^{9} M_{☉}
- Apparent size (V): 2.40′ × 1.9′
- Notable features: Bulgeless

Other designations
- NGC 2139, IC 2154, LEDA 18258, MCG -04-15-005, PGC 18258

NGC 2139 is a barred spiral galaxy in the constellation of Lepus. It was discovered on November 17, 1784, by the German-English astronomer William Herschel. The galaxy is located at a distance of 120.6 million light-years (36.98 Mpc) from the Sun and is receding with a radial velocity of 1,836 km/s.

The overall form of this galaxy is irregular with spiral arms and the appearance of tidal features, suggesting a potential recent merger event. There is no central bulge of significance. The morphological classification is SAB(rs)cd, which indicates a barred spiral galaxy (SAB) with a transitional inner ring structure (rs) and loosely wound spiral arms (cd). It is a star forming galaxy with a formation rate of 3.8 M_{☉}·yr^{−1}. There is a plume extending to the south of the galaxy.

A luminous filament runs through the center of the galaxy, which includes a small nuclear cluster. This cluster is only 4.1×10^{7} years old with a mass of 8.3×10^{5} M_{☉}. It is offset at a distance of 320 pc from the center of the galaxy and may come to rest there on a time scale of around 100 million years. The cluster is a source of X-ray emission.

== Supernovae ==
Three supernovae have been observed in NGC 2139:

- Robert Evans and associates discovered SN 1995ad (Type II, mag. 14) on 28 September 1995. It was positioned in one of the spiral arms, 25″ west and 5″ south of the NGC 2139 nucleus. The recession velocity was consistent with that of the host galaxy.
- SN 2022qhy (Type Ibn, mag. 15.889) was discovered by ATLAS on 1 August 2022.
- SN 2023zcu (Type II, mag. 19.054) was discovered by ATLAS on 8 December 2023.
