= NGC 150 =

Galaxy in the constellation of Sculptor

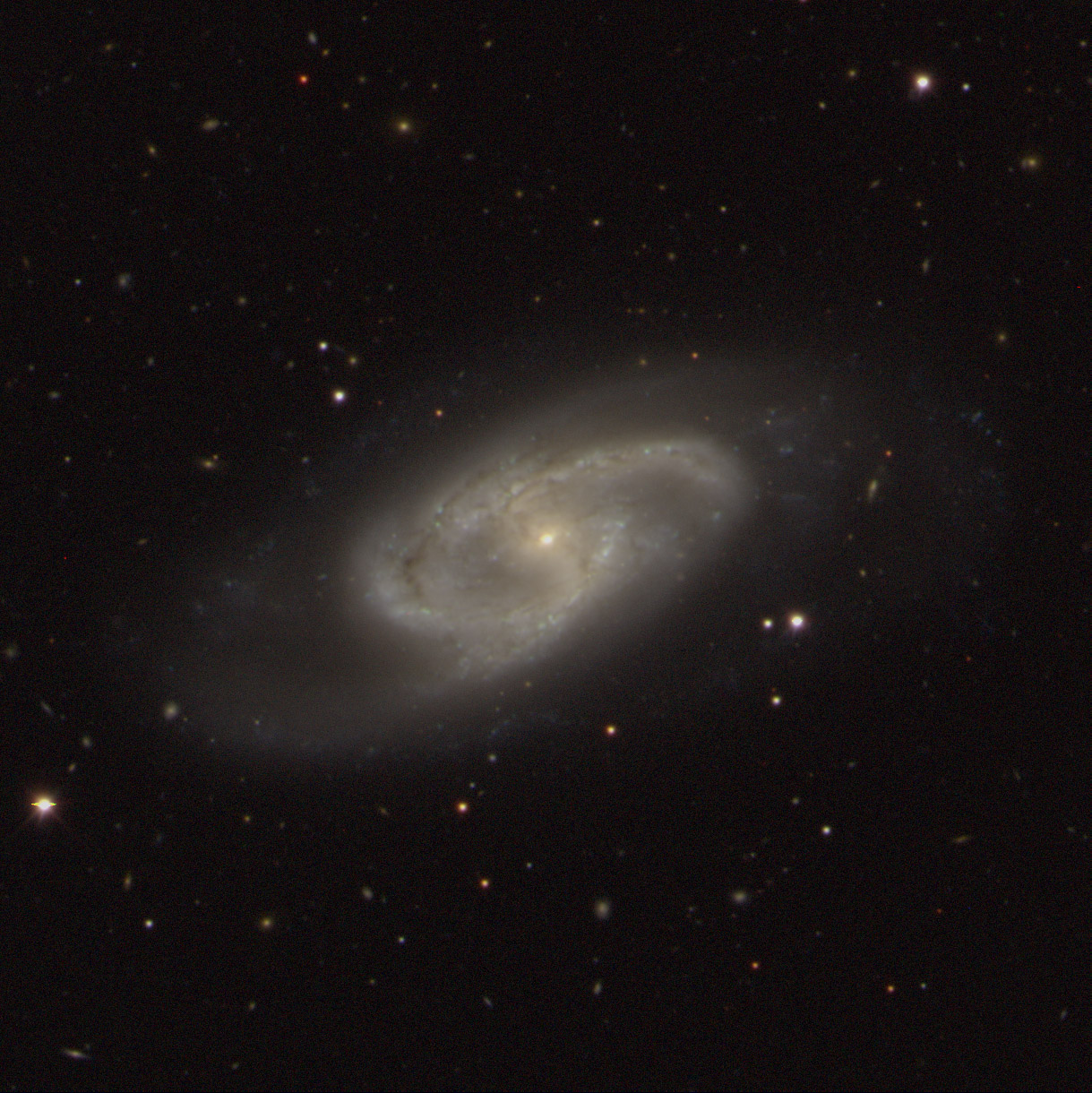
- NGC 150 imaged by DECam

Observation data (J2000 epoch)
- Constellation: Sculptor
- Right ascension: 00^{h} 34^{m} 17.0652^{s}
- Declination: −27° 48′ 21.961″
- Redshift: 0.005294
- Heliocentric radial velocity: 1587 ± 1 km/s
- Distance: 62.92 ± 2.34 Mly (19.291 ± 0.717 Mpc)
- Apparent magnitude (V): 11.13
- Apparent magnitude (B): 12.04

Characteristics
- Type: SB(rs)b?
- Size: 94,300 ly (28.90 kpc)
- Apparent size (V): 3.9′ × 1.9′

Other designations
- ESO 410- G 019, IRAS 00317-2804, UGCA 7, MCG -05-02-018, PGC 2052

NGC 150 (also known as PGC 2052) is a barred spiral galaxy in the constellation Sculptor. It is about 63 million light years away from the Solar System, and it has a diameter of about 94,000 light years. It was discovered by Lewis A. Swift on 20 November 1886.

== Supernovae ==
Two supernovae have been observed in NGC 150:

- SN 1990K (Type II, mag. 14) was discovered by Robert Evans on 25 May 1990. It was reported to be similar to SN 1987A.
- SN 2025mb (Type IIb, mag. 18.011) was discovered by ATLAS on 15 January 2025. Initially classified as Type Ia, it was later determined to be Type IIb.

== See also ==
- List of NGC objects (1–1000)
