= Mount Hopkins (Arizona) =

Landform in Santa Cruz County, Arizona

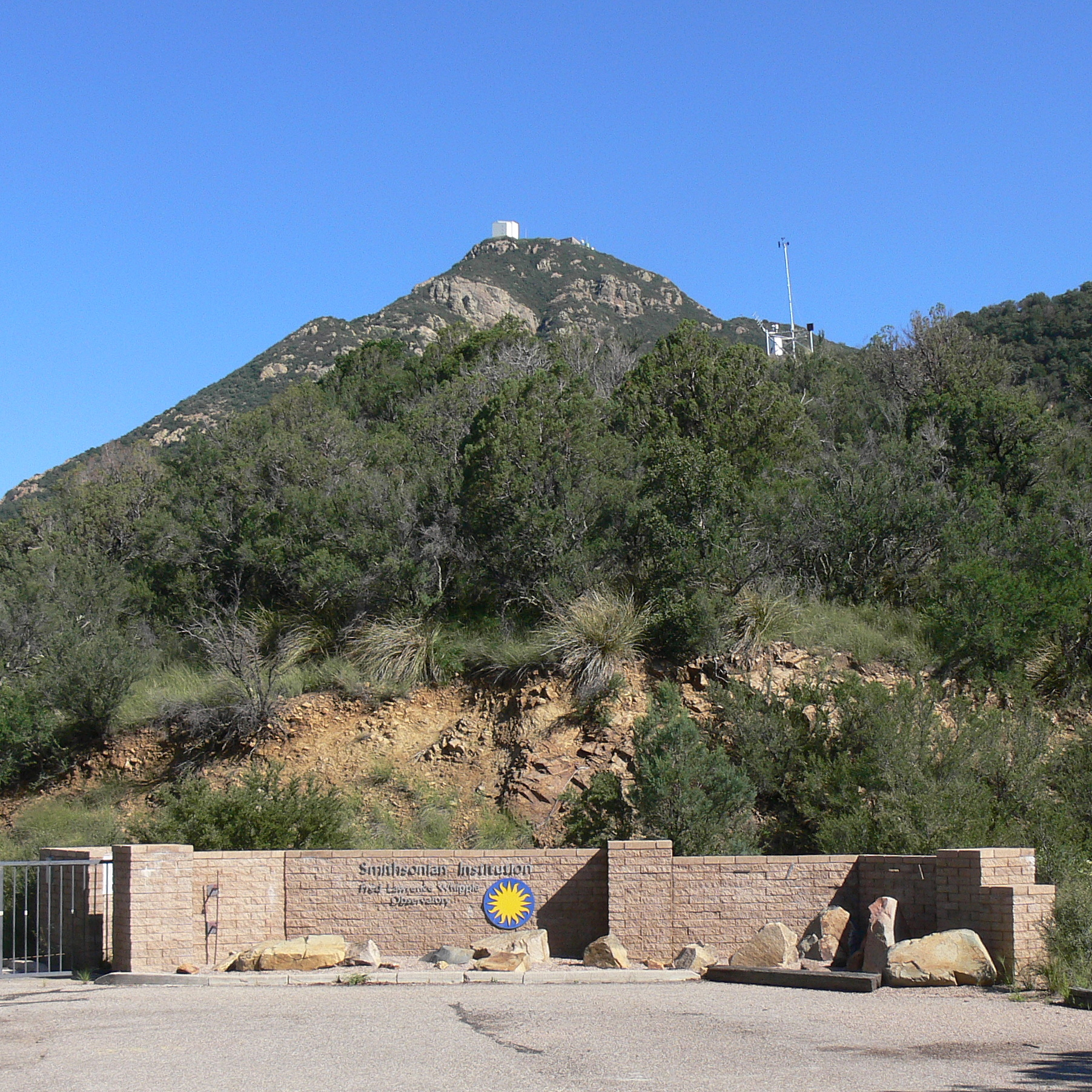
- Summit of Mount Hopkins from the entrance to the Fred Lawrence Whipple Observatory that has two locations, one at the bottom of the mountains and the second (this one) located on the slopes of Mount Hopkins.

Highest point
- Elevation: 8,553 ft (2,607 m) NAVD 88
- Prominence: 1,430 ft (436 m)
- Coordinates: 31°41′18″N 110°53′07″W

Geography
- Location within Arizona
- Location: Santa Cruz County, Arizona, U.S.
- Parent range: Santa Rita Mountains
- Topo map: USGS Mount Hopkins

Mount Hopkins is a 8,553-foot (2,607 m) peak of the Santa Rita Mountains range, in Santa Cruz County, southern Arizona.

The peak was named after Gilbert Hopkins, who was killed nearby during the Battle of Fort Buchanan in 1865.

It is in the Coronado National Forest and is bounded on three sides by the Mount Wrightson Wilderness.

== Fairborn Observatory ==
In 1979, Russell Merle Genet founded the Fairborn Observatory, which he moved from Fairborn, Ohio to Mount Hopkins, Arizona in 1985, and worked there until 1993. He was also its first director, until 1989. Genet and his colleagues developed robotic telescopes there. It became the first totally automatic robotic observatory in the world.

== Fred Lawrence Whipple Observatory ==
The Fred Lawrence Whipple Observatory is located on the mountain. The prime mover for the mountain's observatory was Fred Lawrence Whipple, a professor at Harvard University who was in charge of a small 25 inch mirror telescope in Cambridge, Massachusetts. In Cambridge the ambient light caused light pollution that limited the telescope's usefulness.

That led to engineer Tom Hoffman being appointed by Whipple to search for a site in the U.S. that would provide a clear view of the sky at a high elevation, with minimal surrounding light pollution. After searching many locations, southern Arizona with its dry air and high elevations, and the assistance of The University of Arizona, brought Hoffman to focus on Mt Hopkins. Whipple agreed, leaving the challenge of how to transport an 8 metres (26 ft) diameter glass mirror and build a telescope on an 8,583-foot (2,616 m) mountain that had no road.
