= NGC 7184 =

Galaxy in the constellation Aquarius

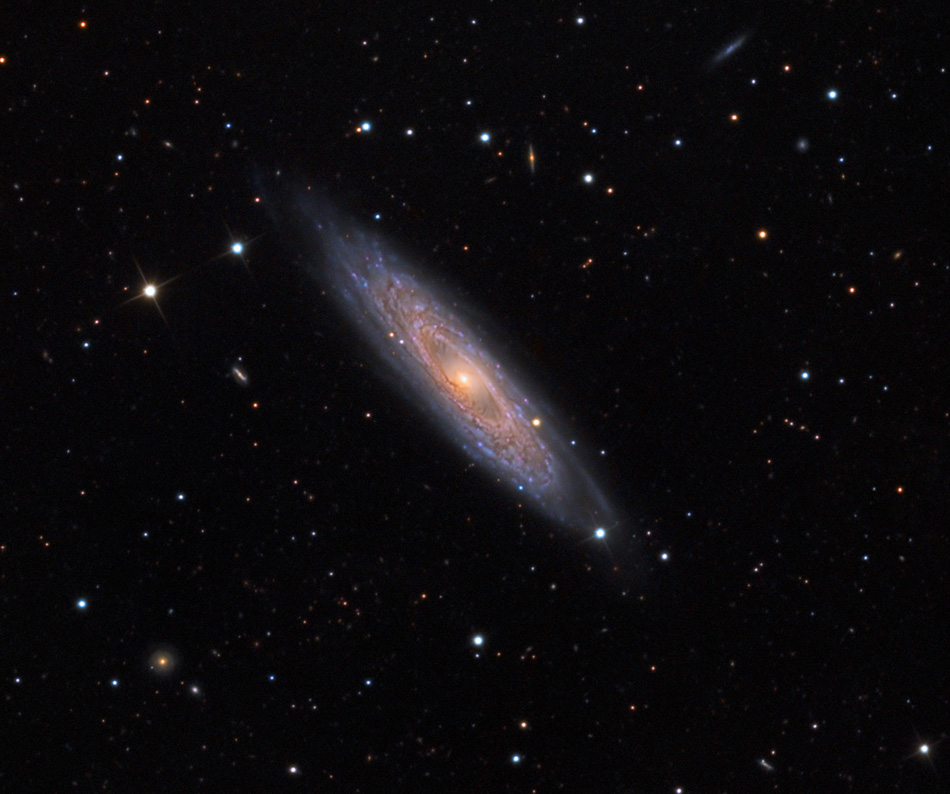
- NGC 7184 by Adam Block/Mount Lemmon SkyCenter

Observation data (J2000 epoch)
- Constellation: Aquarius
- Right ascension: 22^{h} 02^{m} 39.8^{s}
- Declination: −20° 48′ 46″
- Redshift: 0.008739 +/- 0.000010
- Heliocentric radial velocity: 2620 ± 3 km/s
- Distance: 99.3 ± 22.5 Mly (30.5 ± 6.9 Mpc)
- Apparent magnitude (V): 11.1

Characteristics
- Type: SB(r)c
- Size: 236,000 ly (72.34 kpc) (estimated)
- Apparent size (V): 6.0′ × 1.5′

Other designations
- UGCA 425, ESO 601- G009, MCG -04-52-009, PGC 67904

NGC 7184 is a barred spiral galaxy located in the constellation Aquarius. It is located at a distance of circa 100 million light years from Earth, which, given its apparent dimensions, means that NGC 7184 is about 236,000 light years across. It was discovered by William Herschel on October 28, 1783.

== Characteristics ==
NGC 7184 has a small, bright nucleus and an elliptical bulge, whose major axis is aligned with the major axis of the disk. There is a bar along the minor axis of the bulge, but the high inclination of the galaxy makes its presence uncertain. From the bar emanate two tightly wound symmetrical spiral arms that form a bright inner ring. The diameter of the ring along its major axis is 1.71 arcminutes. The arms feature HII regions, and as they emerge from the ring are flocculent, based on the HII distribution, while they begin to split again at the outermost part of the galaxy. Dust lanes are observed in the inner part of the disk.

An outlying HII region has been discovered near NGC 7184. It is located on the major axis of the optical disk, on the northeasterly receding edge. Its size is estimated to be 270 pc at the distance of the galaxy and its Hα luminosity, 10^{37.6} erg s−1. It could be an isolated extension of a spiral arm.

== Supernova ==
One supernova has been observed in NGC 7184.

- SN 1984N was discovered visually by Robert Evans at magnitude 14, 60" east and 65" north of the nucleus on July 20, 1984. Its discovery was confirmed by T. Cragg at the Anglo-Australian Observatory. Initially it was thought to be a variable star in our galaxy, but later study of the object revealed it was indeed a supernova. It was identified as Type I.

== Nearby galaxies ==
NGC 7184 is the foremost galaxy of a small galaxy group known as the NGC 7184 group, which also includes NGC 7183. A satellite galaxy lies 3 arcminutes to the south, at a projected separation of 28 kpc.
