= Russell Merle Genet =

American astronomer (born 1940)

Russell Merle Genet (born 1940) is an American astronomer, who specializes in photometric observations and probing of very short-period eclipsing binary stars.

Between 1964 and 1968 he worked as a rocket scientist for Space and Missile Systems, San Bernardino, California. Between 1969 and 1975 he worked as a mathematical analyst for Aerospace Guidance System Center, Newark, Ohio. Since then until 1990 he worked as a research supervisor for Air Force Human Resources Laboratory, Dayton, Ohio, and Mesa, Arizona.

In 1979 he founded the Fairborn Observatory, which he moved from Fairborn, Ohio to Mount Hopkins, Arizona in 1985, and worked there until 1993. He was also its first director, until 1989. Genet and his colleagues developed robotic telescopes there. It became the first totally automatic robotic observatory in the world. It appeared in the documentary of the Public Broadcasting Service The Perfect Stargazer. He also established the magazine IAPPP Communications, the first international astronomical photometry journal. In 1983 he received the Amateur Achievement Award of the Astronomical Society of the Pacific for his photometric studies and in 1986 the Leslie Peltier Award of the Astronomical League. After Genet left this observatory, he founded the Orion Observatory in Santa Margarita, California.

In 1993 Genet was elected the 51st president of the Astronomical Society of the Pacific and served in this position for two years. Throughout his career, he taught at Central Arizona College, California Polytechnic State University's Osher Institute and Cuesta College. In 2007 he published the book Humanity: The Chimpanzees Who Would Be Ants.

While teaching at Cuesta College, Genet taught an astronomy research seminar that required students to publish their results.

On November 17, 2001 Genet married Cheryl Linda Davidson.

== Publications ==
Books as author or co-author:

- Real-Time Control With the TRS-80, 1982, Howard W. Sams, Indianapolis.
- Photoelectric Photometry of Variable Stars, first edition 1982, second, enlarged edition 1988, Willmann-Bell, Richmond.
- Microcomputer Control of Telescopes, 1985, Willmann-Bell, Richmond.
- Supernova 1987A: Astronomy’s Explosive Enigma, 1987, Fairborn Press, Mesa.
- Robotic Observatories, 1989, AutoScope, Mesa.
- Telescope Control Handbook, 1997, Willmann-Bell, Richmond.
- The Chimpanzees Who Would Be Ants: The Evolutionary Epic of Humanity, 1998, Nova Scientific, Huntington (NY).
- Humanity: The Chimpanzees Who Would Be Ants, 2007, Collins Foundation Press, Santa Margarita (CA).

Books as co-editor:

- The Evolution of Religion: Studies, Theories, and Critiques, 2008, Eds. J. Bulbulia, R. Sosis, E. Harris, R. Genet, C. Genet, K. Wyman, Collins Foundation Press, Santa Margarita (CA).
- The Evolutionary Epic: Science's Story and Humanity's Response, 2009, Eds. C. Genet, R. Genet, B. Swimme, L. Palmer, L. Gibler, Collins Foundation Press, Santa Margarita (CA).
- Small Telescopes and Astronomical Research, 2010, Eds. R. Genet, J. Johnson, V. Wallen, Collins Foundation Press, Santa Margarita (CA).
- The Alt-Az Initiative: Telescope, Mirror, & Instrument Developments, 2010, Eds. R. Genet, J. Johnson, V. Wallen, Collins Foundation Press, Santa Margarita (CA).

Preceded by Jay U. Gunter	Amateur Achievement Award of Astronomical Society of the Pacific; 1984	Succeeded by Gregg Thompson & Robert Evans
