= NGC 7606 =

Galaxy in the constellation Aquarius

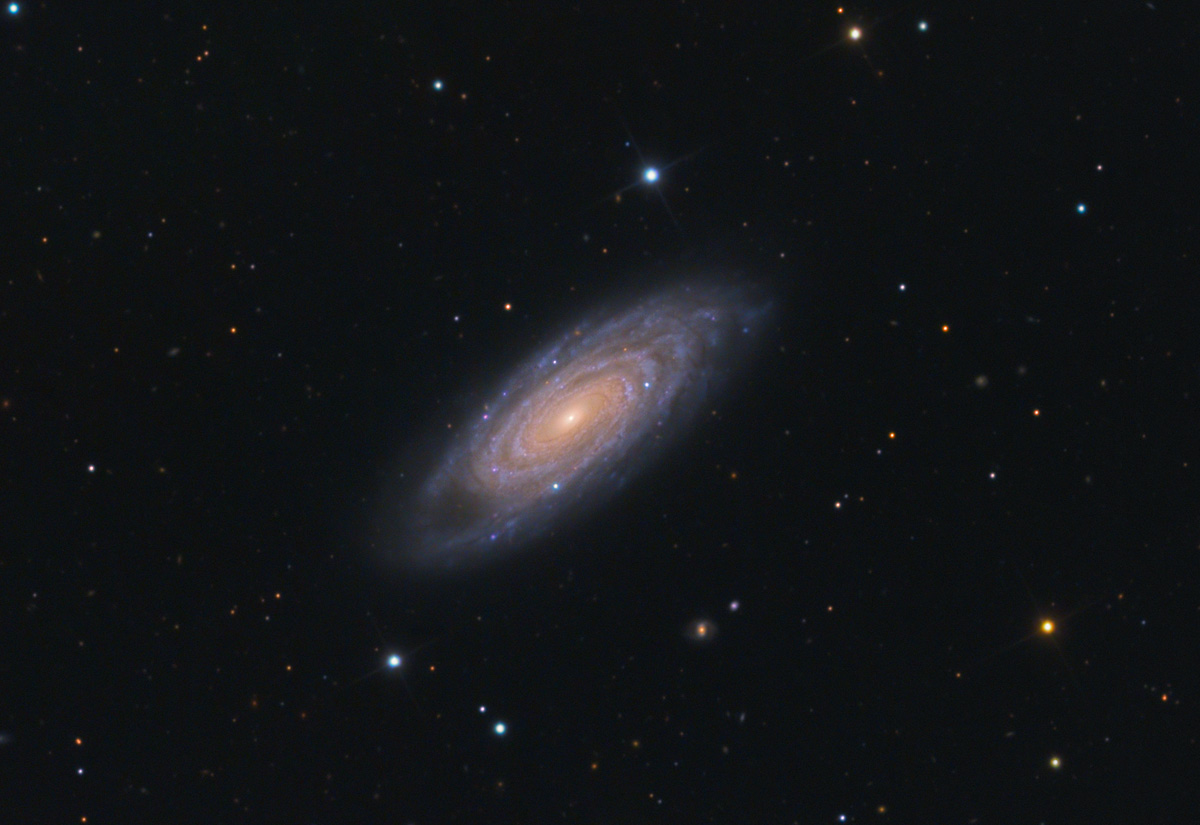
- NGC 7606 by Adam Block/Mount Lemmon SkyCenter

Observation data (J2000 epoch)
- Constellation: Aquarius
- Right ascension: 23^{h} 19^{m} 04.7753^{s}
- Declination: −08° 29′ 06.322″
- Redshift: 0.007442 ± 0.000017
- Heliocentric radial velocity: 2231 ± 5 km/s
- Distance: 98.53 ± 4.00 Mly (30.209 ± 1.226 Mpc)
- Apparent magnitude (V): 10.8

Characteristics
- Type: SA(s)b
- Size: ~201,100 ly (61.66 kpc) (estimated)
- Apparent size (V): 5.4′ × 2.2′

Other designations
- IRAS 23164-0845, MCG -02-59-012, PGC 71047

NGC 7606 is a spiral galaxy located in the constellation Aquarius. It is located at a distance of about 100 million light years from Earth, which, given its apparent dimensions, means that NGC 7606 is about 200,000 light years across. It was discovered by William Herschel on September 28, 1785. The galaxy is included in the Herschel 400 Catalogue. It lies 45 arcminutes northeast from psi2 Aquarii. It can be seen with a 4 inch telescope but its visibility is greatly affected by light pollution.

== Characteristics ==
NGC 7606 is a spiral galaxy seen on inclination. It has a bright nucleus surrounded by a prominent bulge, which is seen elliptical due to the inclination. No bar has been observed. A ring with an apparent diameter of 0.85 arcminutes has been detected at the central part of the galaxy. The galaxy features two main arms, that can be traced for nearly 360°, and several arm fragments. The arms are smooth and rather tight, although not as tightly wound as the ones of NGC 488. Few bright spots have been observed in the arms. The galaxy is found to host a supermassive black hole, whose mass based on bulge velocity dispersion σ is estimated to be 15-22 million M_{☉}. NGC 7606 is an isolated galaxy.

== Supernovae ==
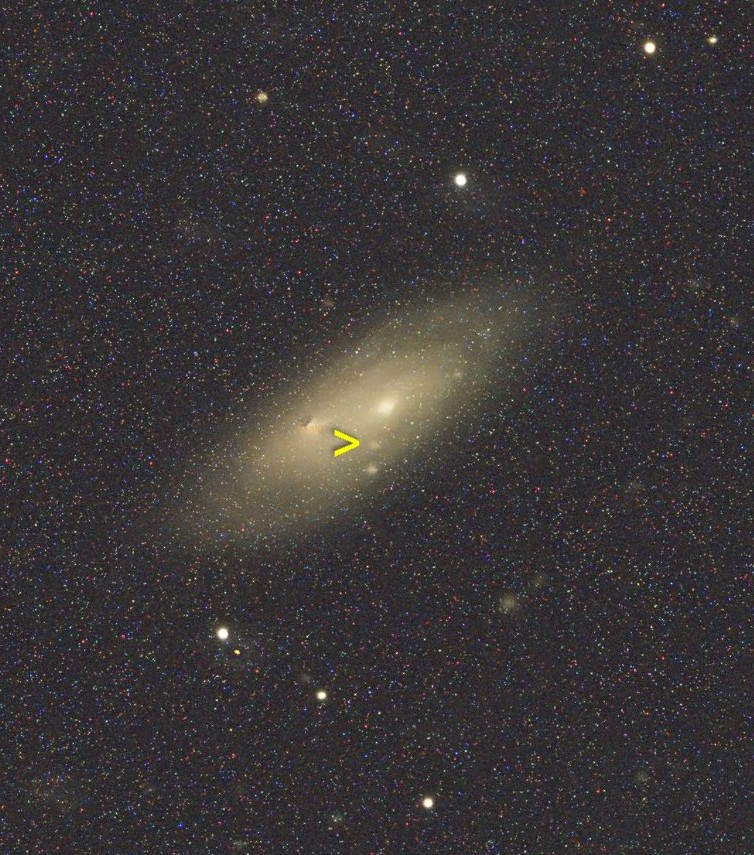
NGC 7606 with SN 2025vzq marked, imaged on 21 September 2025

Three supernovae have been observed in NGC 7606:

- SN 1965M (type unknown, mag. 16) was discovered by Paul Wild on 4 October 1965.
- SN 1987N (Type Ia, mag. 13.8) was discovered by Robert Evans on 14 December 1987.
- SN 2025vzq (Type Ic, mag. 19.22) was discovered by GOTO on 28 August 2025.

== Gallery ==
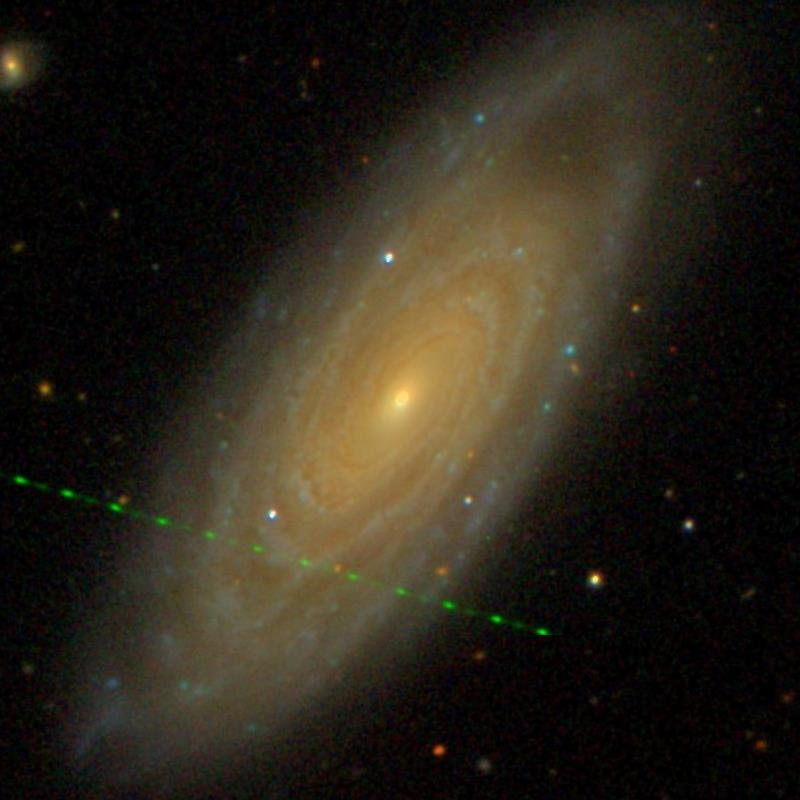
NGC 7606 imaged by SDSS
