= NGC 7689 =

Galaxy in the constellation Phoenix

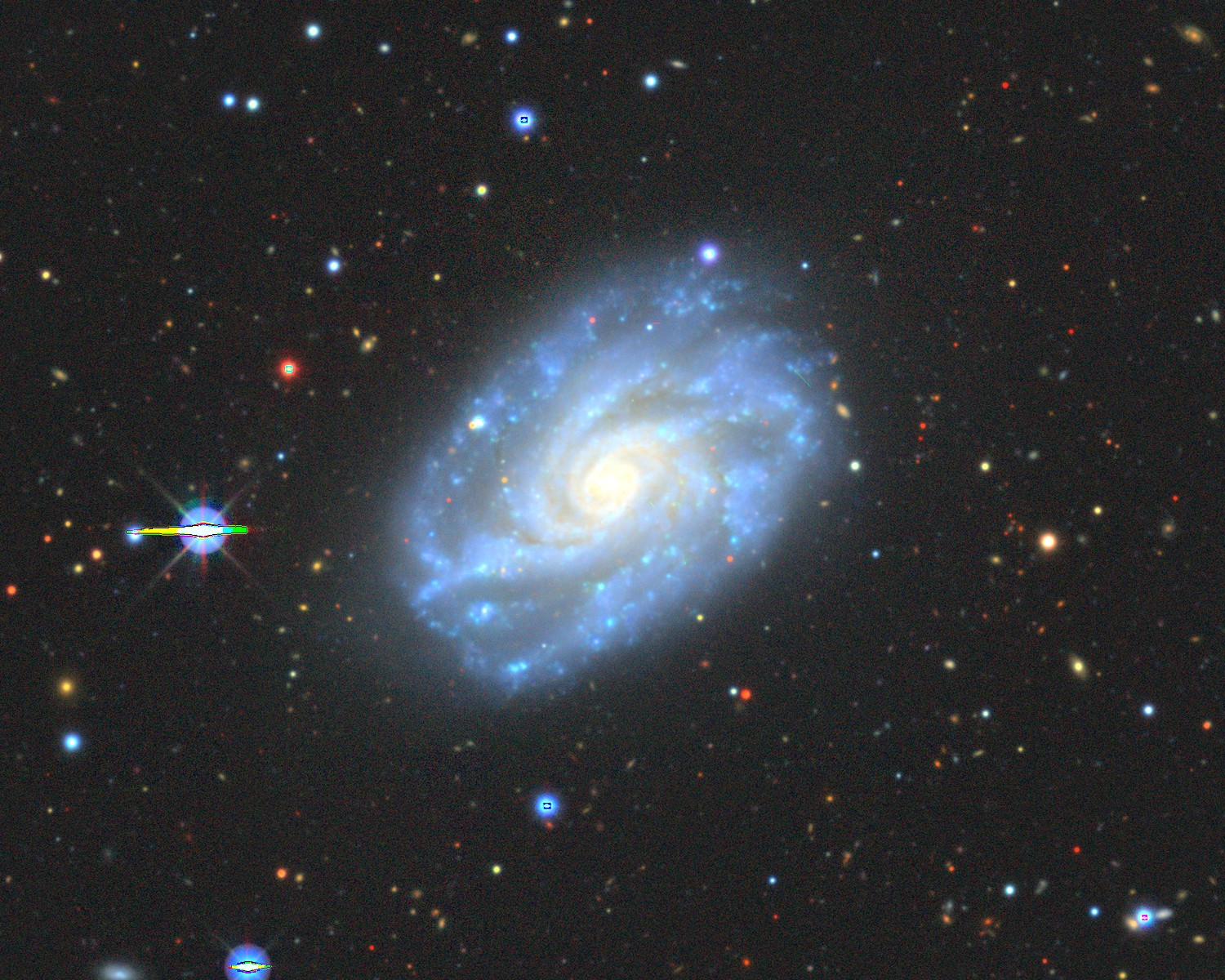
- NGC 7689 imaged by Legacy Surveys

Observation data (J2000 epoch)
- Constellation: Phoenix
- Right ascension: 23^{h} 33^{m} 16.7309^{s}
- Declination: −54° 05′ 39.692″
- Redshift: 0.006571±0.0000170
- Heliocentric radial velocity: 1,970±5 km/s
- Distance: 79.30 ± 1.36 Mly (24.315 ± 0.417 Mpc)
- Apparent magnitude (V): 12.2

Characteristics
- Type: SAB(rs)cd
- Size: ~92,300 ly (28.29 kpc) (estimated)
- Apparent size (V): 2.9′ × 1.9′

Other designations
- ESO 192- G 007, IRAS 23305-5422, 2MASX J23331672-5405401, PGC 71729

NGC 7689 is an intermediate spiral galaxy in the constellation of Phoenix. Its velocity with respect to the cosmic microwave background is 1,791±13 km/s, which corresponds to a Hubble distance of 86.2 ± 6.1 Mly (26.42 ± 1.86 Mpc). Also, 13 non-redshift measurements give a closer mean distance of 79.30 ± 1.36 Mly (24.315 ± 0.417 Mpc). It was discovered by Scottish astronomer James Dunlop on 5 September 1826.

NGC 7689 has a possible active galactic nucleus, i.e. it has a compact region at the center of a galaxy that emits a significant amount of energy across the electromagnetic spectrum, with characteristics indicating that this luminosity is not produced by the stars. It is also a Seyfert II galaxy, i.e. it has a quasar-like nucleus with very high surface brightnesses whose spectra reveal strong, high-ionisation emission lines, but unlike quasars, the host galaxy is clearly detectable.

== Supernova ==
One supernova has been observed in NGC 7689:

- SN 1996al (Type II, mag. 14.0) was discovered by Robert Evans, R. Benton, and S. Beaman on 22 July 1996.

== Image gallery ==
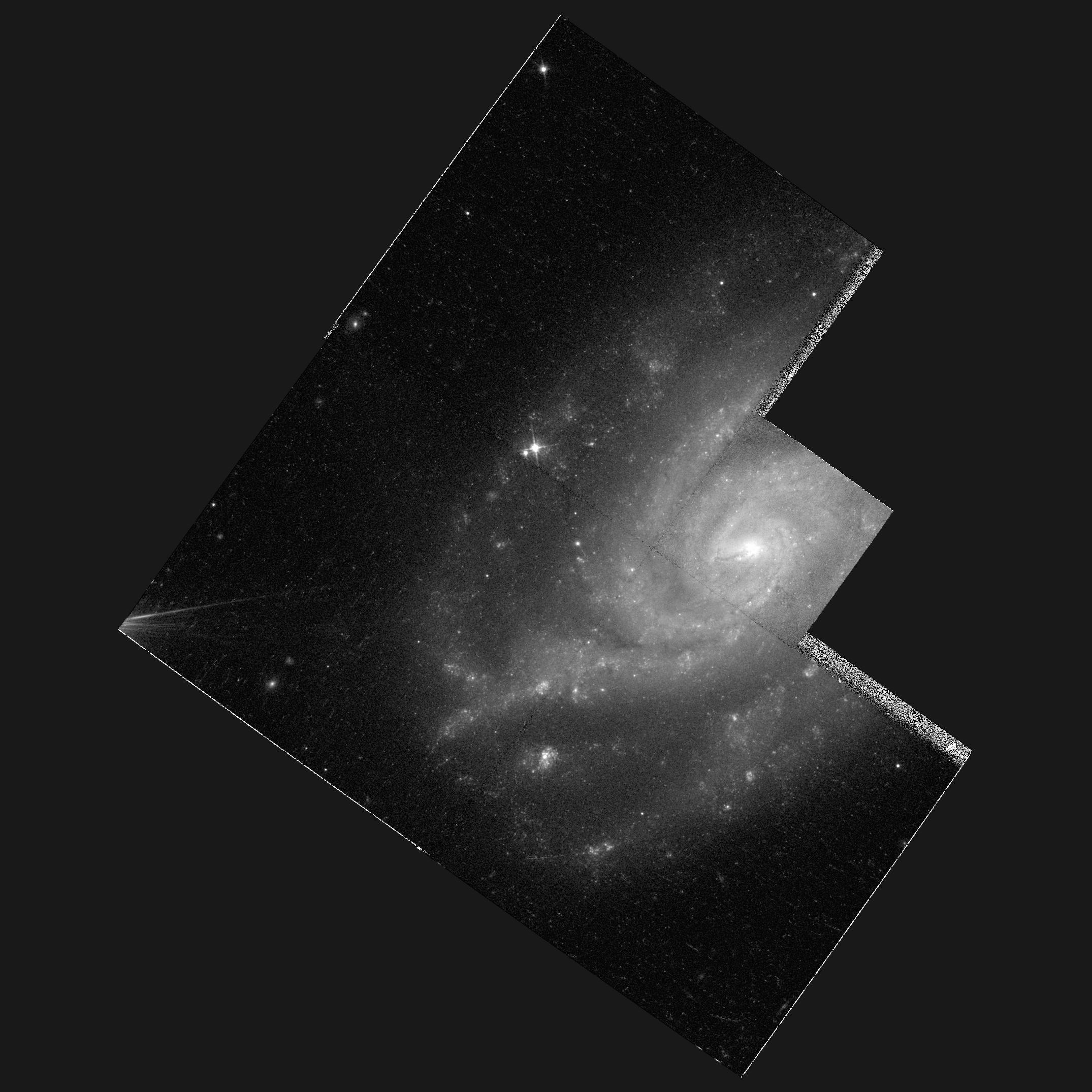
NGC 7689 imaged by the Hubble Space Telescope

== See also ==
- List of NGC objects (7001–7840)
