= C/1996 J1 (Evans–Drinkwater) =

Parabolic comet

Discovery
- Discovered by: Robert O. Evans; Michael J. Drinkwater
- Discovery site: Siding Spring Observatory (UK Schmidt Telescope)
- Discovery date: 10 May 1996

Orbital characteristics
- Epoch: 27 January 1998 (JD 2450840.5)
- Observation arc: 2.60 years (951 days)
- Number of observations: 522
- Perihelion: 1.298 AU
- Eccentricity: 1.00103
- Inclination: 22.516°
- Longitude of ascending node: 278.17°
- Argument of periapsis: 14.801°
- Mean anomaly: 0.009°
- Last perihelion: 30 December 1996
- Earth MOID: 0.293 AU
- Comet total magnitude (M1): 9.8 (A); 12.9 (B)
- Comet nuclear magnitude (M2): 10.0 (B)

Comet Evans–Drinkwater, also known as C/1996 J1, is a non-periodic comet that was observed between May 1996 and December 1998. It is known to have split into two large fragments about 70 days before reaching perihelion, however the second fragment was only first observed by May 1997.
