= NGC 5054 =

Galaxy in the constellation Virgo

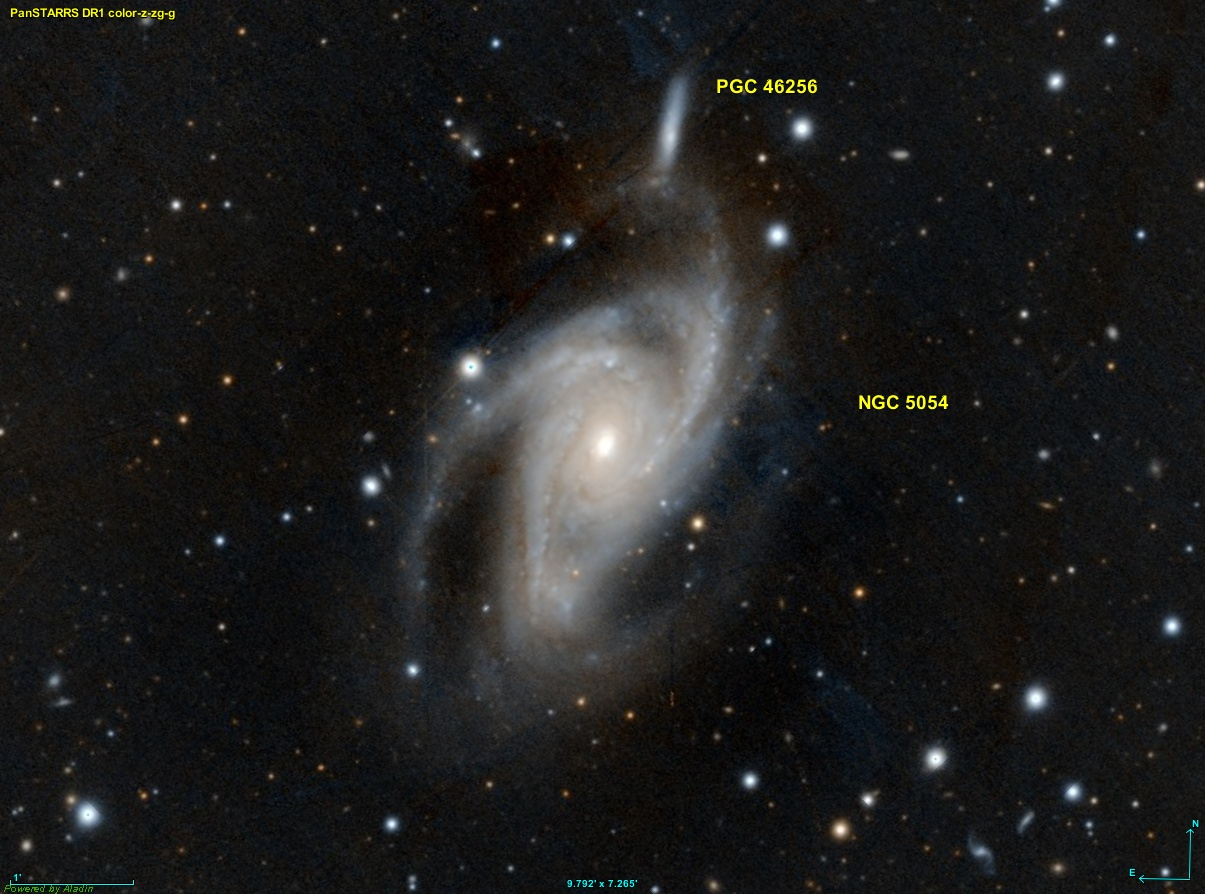
- NGC 5054 imaged by PanSTARRS

Observation data (J2000 epoch)
- Constellation: Virgo
- Right ascension: 13^{h} 16^{m} 58.4407^{s}
- Declination: −16° 38′ 04.429″
- Redshift: 0.005811 ± 0.000007
- Heliocentric radial velocity: 1,742 ± 2 km/s
- Distance: 54.9 ± 10.5 Mly (16.8 ± 3.2 Mpc)
- Group or cluster: NGC 5044 Group
- Apparent magnitude (V): 10.9

Characteristics
- Type: SA(s)bc
- Size: ~84,000 ly (25.7 kpc) (estimated)
- Apparent size (V): 5.1′ × 3.0′

Other designations
- IRAS 13142-1622, UGCA 344, MCG -03-34-039, PGC 46247

NGC 5054 is a spiral galaxy in the constellation Virgo. The galaxy lies about 55 million light years away from Earth based on redshift-independent methods, which means, given its apparent dimensions, that NGC 5054 is approximately 85,000 light years across. Based on redshift the galaxy lies about 80 million light years away. It was discovered by William Herschel on December 31, 1785. It is included in the Herschel 400 Catalogue. It lies about 6 degrees southwest of Spica and near the star 53 Virginis.

== Characteristics ==
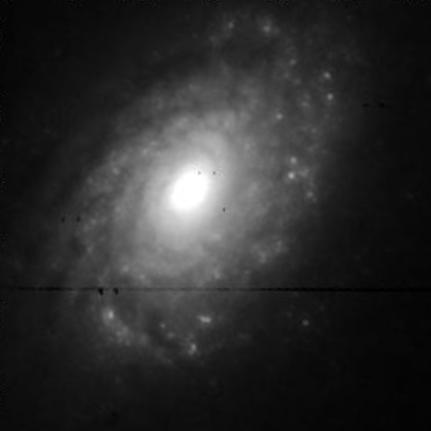
The inner disk of NGC 5054 by the Hubble Space Telescope.

NGC 5054 has a bright nucleus which hosts a nuclear bar making the bulge appear elliptical. The galaxy has three prominent spiral arms in a grand design pattern. The arms emerge from the inner disk spaced about 120 degrees apart. The arms are loosely wrapped around, with the northern arm appearing more tightly wrapped. The arms can be traced for about half a revolution before fading. Many star forming knots are visible in spiral arms. The largest HII regions are about two arcseconds across. The star formation rate of the galaxy is estimated to be 2.6 M_{☉} per year. In the centre of the galaxy lies a supermassive black hole, whose mass is estimated to be 10^{6.62 ± 0.36} (1.8 - 9.5 millions) M_{☉}, based on the pitch angle of the spiral arms.

== Supernovae ==
Three supernovae have been observed in NGC 5054:

- SN 2004ab was discovered on 21 February 2004 by Berto Monard at an apparent magnitude of 14.7 2" west and 11" north from the centre of the galaxy. It was identified as a Type Ia supernova about one week past maximum. The supernova was highly reddened.
- SN 2014A was discovered on 1 January 2014 by Lick Observatory Supernova Search using the Katzman Automatic Imaging Telescope at an apparent magnitude of 16.4. It was identified as a Type II supernova more than a month past explosion.
- SN 2018is was discovered on 20 January 2018 at an apparent red magnitude of 17.9. It was identified as a low-luminosity Type II-P supernova with an atypically steep decline during the photospheric phase and remarkably narrow emission lines.

== Nearby galaxies ==
NGC 5054 lies at the outskirts of the NGC 5044 Group. The difference in redshift between NGC 5054 and the group is -919 ± 61 km/s. Makarov et al place NGC 5054 in the same cloud with the NGC 5044 Group, however belonging to a different group, the NGC 5054 Group, along with NGC 5037 and some other fainter galaxies.

A Magellanic galaxy is seen superimposed on the northern arm of the galaxy, 2.7 arcminutes from the centre. It is possible that the interaction of the two galaxies has resulted in star formation in the dwarf galaxy and could be cause of the peculiar arm morphology of NGC 5054. It is also possible that the peculiar shape is the result of the interaction of the galaxy with the extended halo of the NGC 5044 group.
