= NGC 1433 =

Galaxy in the constellation Horologium

- NGC 1433 imaged by Legacy Surveys

Observation data (J2000 epoch)
- Constellation: Horologium
- Right ascension: 03^{h} 42^{m} 01.553^{s}
- Declination: −47° 13′ 19.49″
- Redshift: 0.003590
- Heliocentric radial velocity: 1076±1 km/s
- Distance: 46.2 ± 3.8 Mly (14.15 ± 1.15 Mpc)
- Group or cluster: Dorado Group
- Apparent magnitude (V): 9.99
- Apparent magnitude (B): 10.84

Characteristics
- Type: (R'_1)SB(rs)ab
- Apparent size (V): 6.5′ × 5.9′

Other designations
- ESO 249-14, IRAS 03404-4722, 2MASX J03420155-4713194, LEDA 13586, PGC 13586

NGC 1433 (also known as PGC 13586) is a barred spiral galaxy with a double ring structure located in the constellation of Horologium. It was discovered by James Dunlop on 28 September 1826, and lies a distance of 46 million light-years from Earth.

NGC 1433 is a Seyfert galaxy with an active galactic nucleus. The central region of the galaxy displays intense star formation activity, with an irregular star-forming ring of 5″ (or 0.3 kpc) radius and weak radio wave emission. Star formation is also noticeable in the spiral arms but not the bar of the galaxy. NGC 1433 is being studied as part of a survey of 50 nearby galaxies known as the Legacy ExtraGalactic UV Survey (LEGUS). A jet of material flowing away from the central black hole of the galaxy extending for only 150 light-years has been found. It is the smallest molecular outflow ever observed in a galaxy beyond our own.

NGC 1433 is member of the Dorado Group.

== Supernovae ==
NGC 1433 with SN 2026ahvu (blue star below and to the right of the nucleus) imaged by the Gemini South telescope

Two supernovae have been observed in NGC 1433.

- SN 1985P (Type II, mag. 13.5) was discovered by Robert Evans on 10 October 1985.
- SN 2026ahvu (Type Ia, mag. 17.063) was discovered by ATLAS on 2 November 2026. This is one of the nearest Type Ia supernovae observed since SN 2011fe.

== Gallery ==
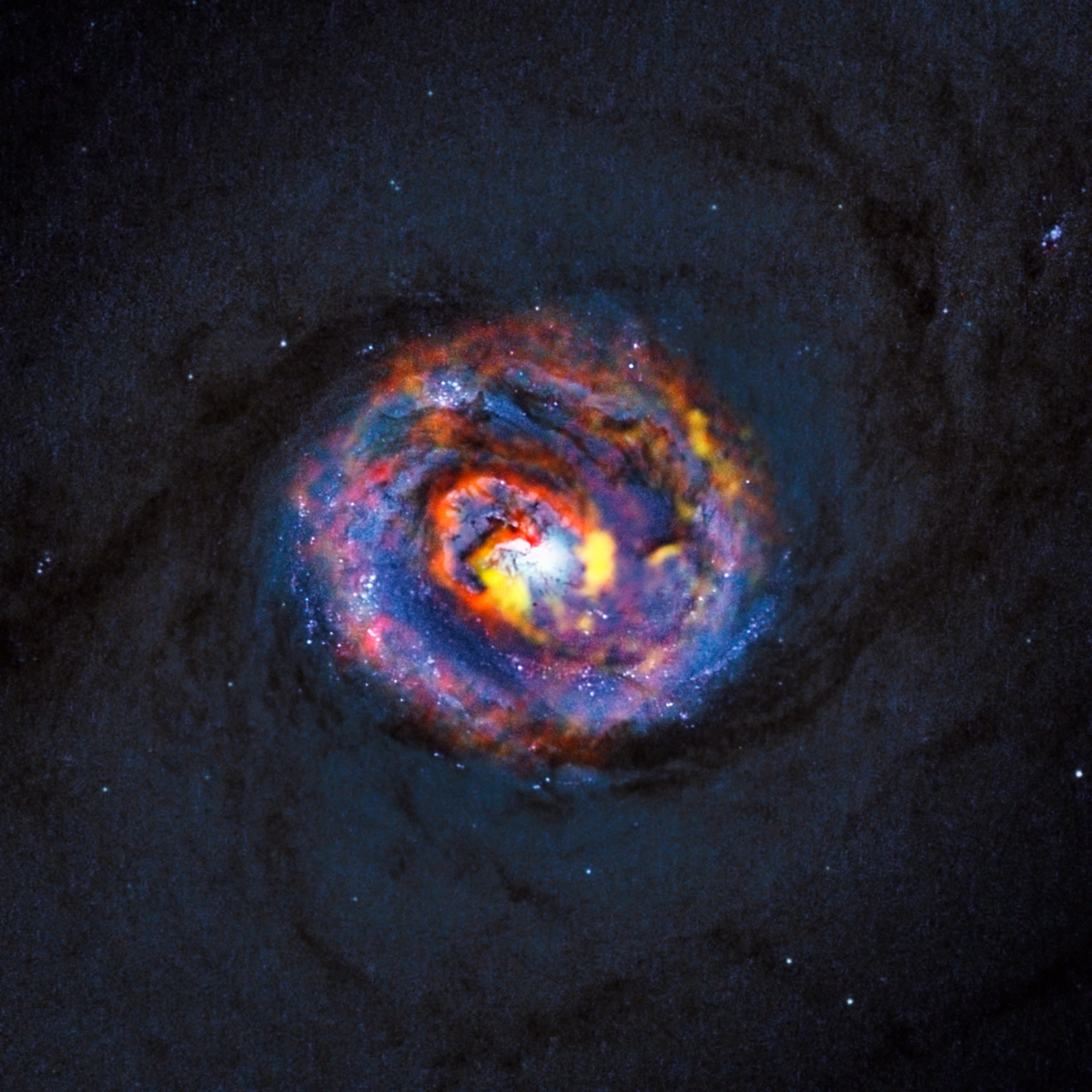
Composite view of the nucleus of NGC 1433 imaged by the ALMA and the Hubble Space Telescope

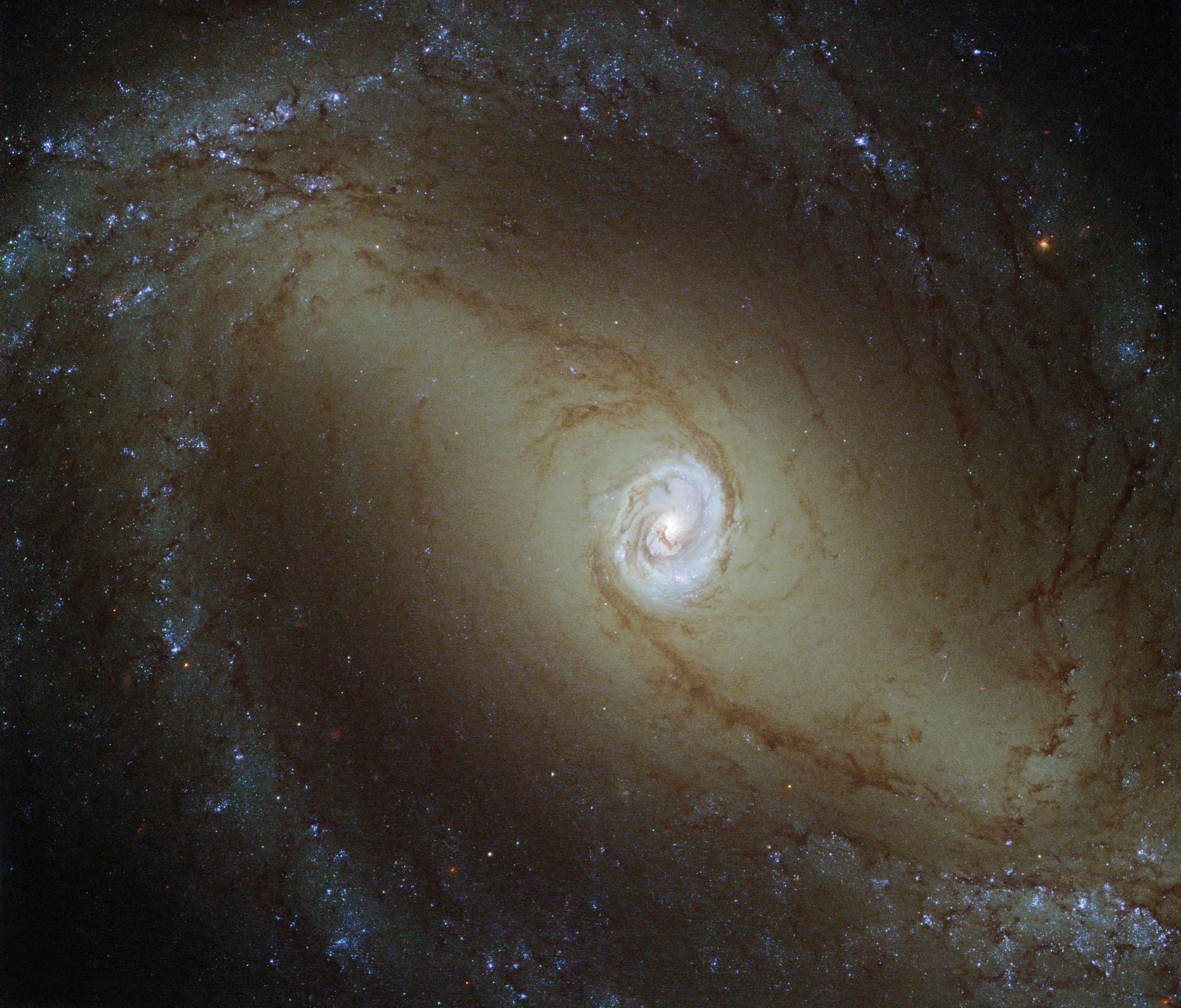
LEGUS, optical.

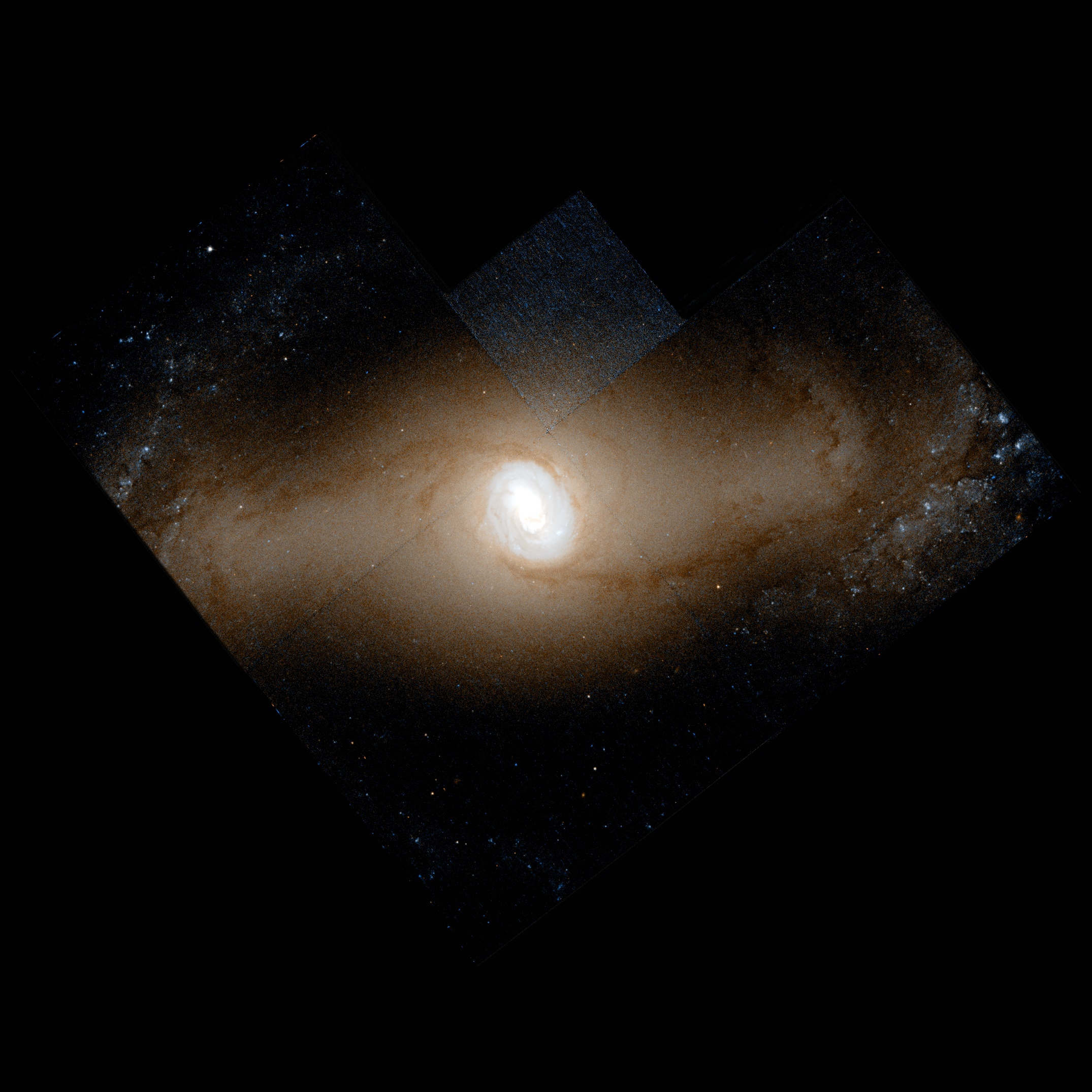
Hubble Space Telescope, optical.

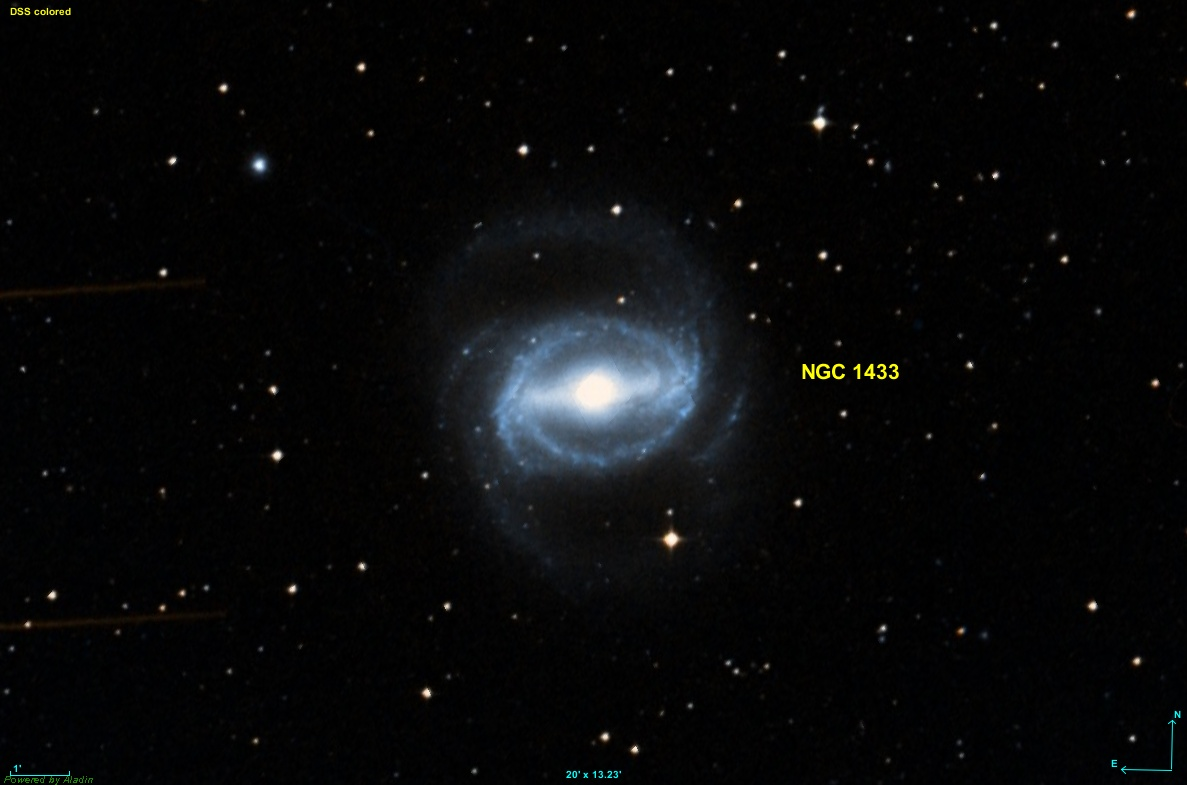
STSci DSS, optical.

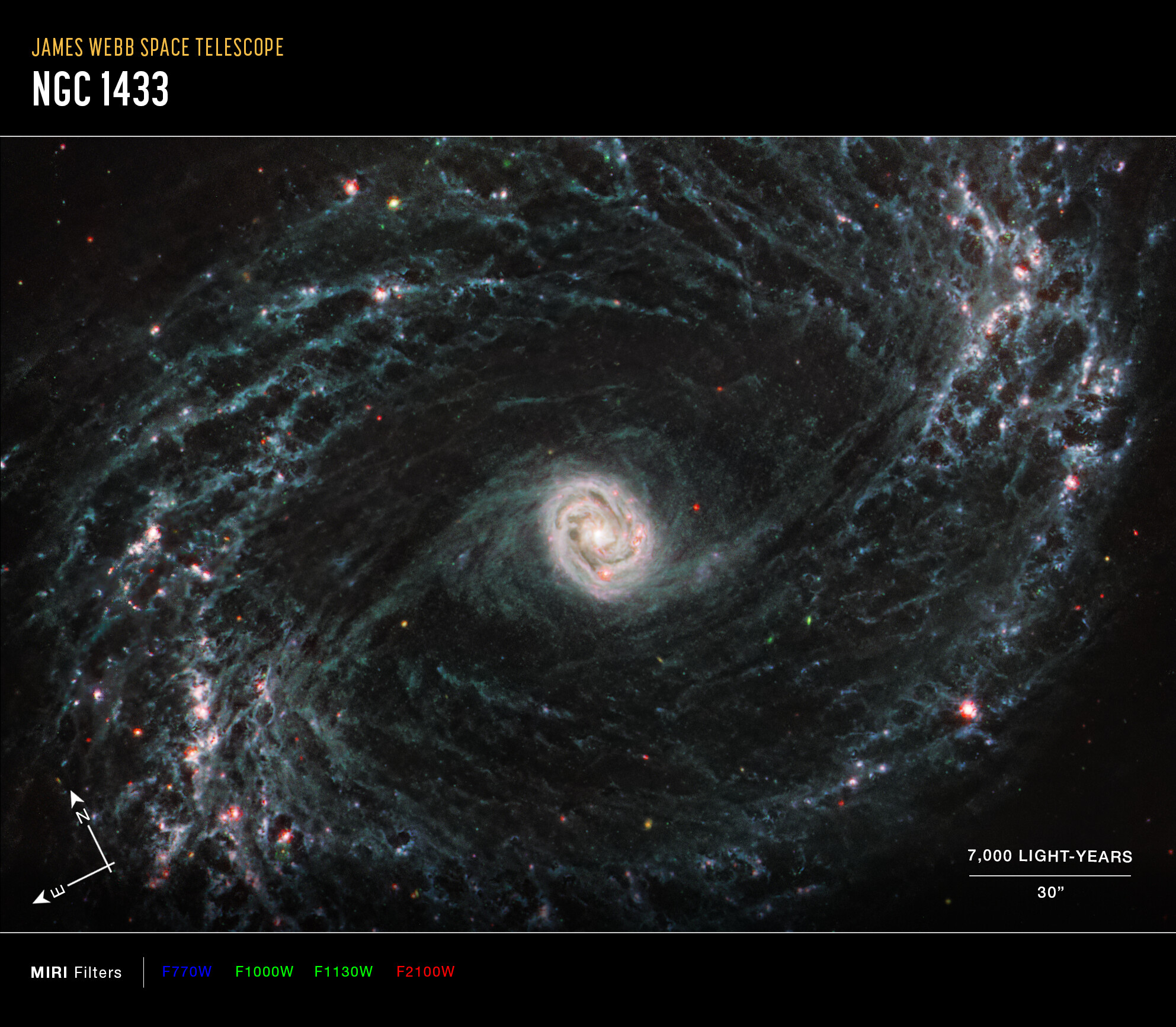
James Webb Space Telescope, MIRI; compass.
