= Jay U. Gunter =

American physician

June U. Gunter (January 15, 1911 – November 14, 1994), better known as Jay U. Gunter or J. U. Gunter, was an American pathologist and amateur astronomer.

== Life and professional career ==
Gunter was born in Sanford, North Carolina. In 1931 he graduated from the University of North Carolina at Chapel Hill and then continued here and at the Jefferson Medical College in Philadelphia with his medical education. He received his degree in 1938. The Second World War he spent in the Medical Corps of the United States Navy. From 1947 he worked as Pathologist and Director of Laboratories, Watts Hospital in Durham, North Carolina. He was also a visiting Professor of Pathology at the University of North Carolina School of Medicine.

== Amateur astronomy ==
In 1976 Gunter retired and devoted the rest of his life to amateur astronomy. His main field of study and observation was asteroids. He founded and for more than 15 years published the popular magazine Tonight's Asteroids. It was a bimonthly periodical, distributed free, containing finding charts and news from the world of asteroid studies. It was widely acknowledged for bringing attention of many amateur astronomers to asteroid observation. In 1980 the main belt asteroid 2136 Jugta was named in his honour (the name being an acronym of the first letters of his and his magazine's names). In 1983 he received the Amateur Achievement Award of the Astronomical Society of the Pacific and in 1989 the Caroline Herschel Award of the Western Amateur Astronomer Society.

Preceded by Ben Mayer	Amateur Achievement Award of Astronomical Society of the Pacific; 1983	Succeeded by Russell Merle Genet
