= NGC 3300 =

Lenticular galaxy in the constellation of Leo

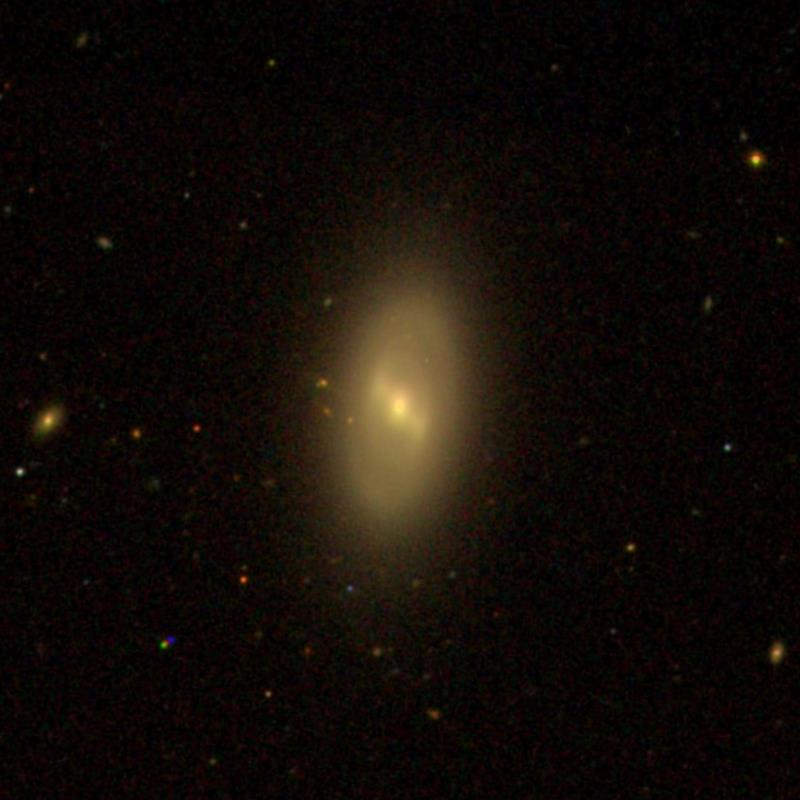
- SDSS image of NGC 3300

Observation data (J2000 epoch)
- Constellation: Leo
- Right ascension: 10^{h} 36^{m} 38.43673^{s}
- Declination: +14° 10′ 15.9950″
- Redshift: 0.01007
- Heliocentric radial velocity: 3004 km/s
- Distance: 161.6 ± 11.4 Mly (49.55 ± 3.49 Mpc)
- Apparent magnitude (B): 13.32
- Surface brightness: 22.99
- magnitude (J): 10.29
- magnitude (H): 9.61
- magnitude (K): 9.39

Characteristics
- Type: SAB(r)0^{0}:?

Other designations
- UGC 5766, MCG +02-27-030, PGC 31472

NGC 3300 is a lenticular galaxy in the constellation Leo. It was discovered by the astronomer William Herschel on 19 March 1784.

NGC 3300 is a LINER-type galaxy. NGC 3300 is part of a galaxy group known as NGC 3306 Group or LGG 207. It has at least 7 confirmed members, which are NGC 3306, NGC 3300, UGC 5695, UGC 5739, UGC 5760, UGC 5758 and UGC 5781.
