= NGC 4939 =

Spiral galaxy in the constellation Virgo

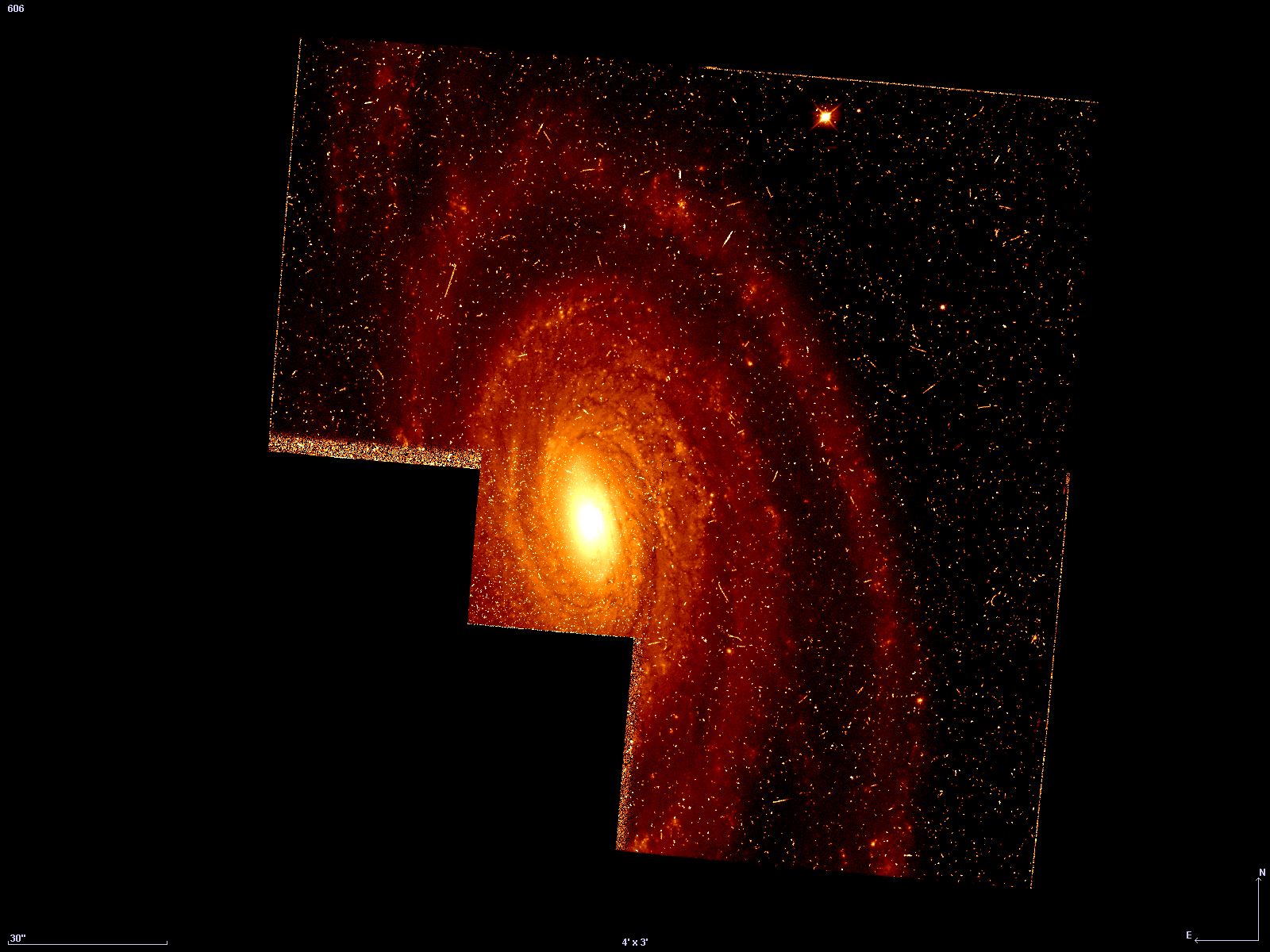
- NGC 4939 imaged by the Hubble Space Telescope

Observation data (J2000 epoch)
- Constellation: Virgo
- Right ascension: 13^{h} 04^{m} 14.3133^{s}
- Declination: −10° 20′ 22.417″
- Redshift: 0.010561
- Heliocentric radial velocity: 3166 ± 2 km/s
- Distance: 118 ± 30 Mly (36.1 ± 9.4 Mpc)
- Apparent magnitude (V): 11.3

Characteristics
- Type: SA(s)bc
- Size: ~192,800 ly (59.10 kpc) (estimated)
- Apparent size (V): 5.5′ × 2.8′
- Notable features: Seyfert galaxy

Other designations
- IRAS 13016-1004, MCG -02-33-104, PGC 45170

NGC 4939 is a large spiral galaxy located in the constellation Virgo. It is located at a distance of about 120 million light years from Earth, which, given its apparent dimensions, means that NGC 4939 is about 190,000 light years across. It was discovered by William Herschel on March 25, 1786.

== Characteristics ==
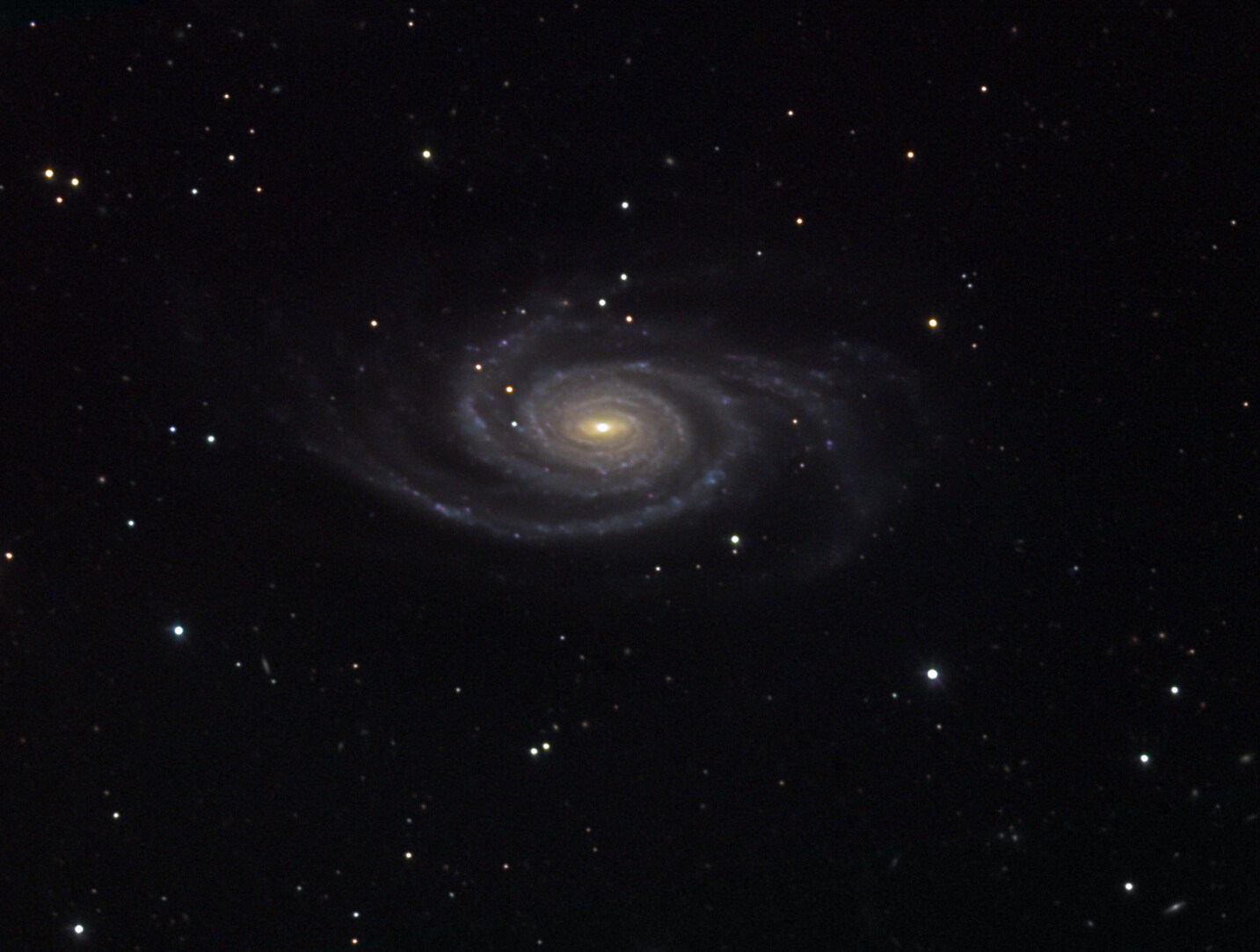
NGC 4939 imaged by Adam Block in 2014.

NGC 4939 has been characterised as a Seyfert galaxy, a galaxy category which features bright point-like nuclei. NGC 4939 is a type II Seyfert galaxy. Its X-ray spectrum is more consistent with a Compton-thick cold reflection source, which means that the source is hidden behind dense material, mainly gas and dust, and the X-rays observed have been reflected, but a Compton-thin transmission model could not be ruled out. The equivalent width of the FeKα line is large, indicating too that it is a Compton-thick source. Further observations by Swift Observatory confirmed its Compton-thick nature. The source of activity in the active galactic nuclei is a supermassive black hole (SMBH) lying at the centre of the galaxy. The SMBH at the centre of NGC 4939 is accreting material with a rate of 0.077 M_{☉} per year. The black hole has been detected in hard X-rays, which are not absorbed by the Compton-thick column, by INTEGRAL.

The galaxy has a large elliptical bulge and maybe a weak bar. It is a grand design spiral galaxy, with two tightly wrapped arms emanating from the bulge. The arms are thin, smooth and well defined and can be traced for nearly one and a half revolutions before fading. Two symmetric arm sections or arcs are observed in the central part of the galaxy. The galaxy is seen with an inclination of 56 degrees. The rotational speed of the galaxy is about 270 km/s.

== Supernovae ==
Five supernovae have been observed in NGC 4939:

- SN 1968X (type unknown, mag. 16) was discovered by Swiss astronomer Paul Wild on 27 November 1968.
- SN 1973J (type unknown, mag. 16) was discovered by Paul Wild on 21 May 1973.
- SN 2008aw (Type II, mag. 15.9) was discovered by the Lick Observatory Supernova Search (LOSS) on 2 March 2008.
- SN 2014B (Type II-P, mag. 17.0) was discovered by the Lick Observatory Supernova Search (LOSS) on 2 January 2014.
- SN 2020nif (Type II, mag. 16.1492) was discovered by the Zwicky Transient Facility on 24 June 2020.

== Nearby galaxies ==
NGC 4939 belongs to a small galaxy group known as the NGC 4933 group, named after the multiple galaxy NGC 4933. The group lies between the Local Supercluster and Hydra-Centaurus Supercluster.
