= Leonardo Meeus =

Belgian Academic

- Born: Leuven, Belgium
- Occupations: Director of the Florence School of Regulation and Director of Vlerick Energy
- Title: Professor

Academic background
- Education: KU Leuven
- Thesis: Power Exchange Auction Trading Platform Design (2006)

Academic work
- Discipline: Nonmarket strategy, EU Energy Policy, and Energy Economics

Leonardo Meeus is a Belgian academic who studies Nonmarket Strategy, EU Energy Policy and Energy Economics. He is the Director of the Florence School of Regulation and professor at the European University Institute, Florence, Italy, in the Robert Schuman Centre for Advanced Studies and Director of the Energy Centre at Vlerick Business School in Brussels, Belgium.

== Career ==
Meeus received his PhD in Electrical Engineering from KU Leuven in 2006. Prior to joining the European University Institute, he was involved in the creation of the first international electricity market in Europe and studied electricity highways working for a project developer in Dublin.

In addition to his role as Deputy Director of the Florence School of Regulation, Meeus is the Director of the Energy Centre, and professor of Strategy and Corporate Affairs at Vlerick Business School, Brussels, Belgium and has also been a guest professor at KU Leuven. Meeus has provided expertise for EU institutions, regulatory agencies, and companies via research contracts and advisory roles. He is member of the Academic Panel of the Office of Gas and Electricity Markets (since 2017), the energy regulator in the United Kingdom, as well as a member of the International Association for Energy Economics.

== Selected publications ==
- Meeus, L., The Evolution of Electricity Markets in Europe, Edward Elgar, 2020
- Schittekatte, T. & Meeus, L., "Least-cost Distribution Network Tariff Design in Theory and Practice", IAEE Energy Journal, 2020, Vol. 41, No. 5
- Meeus, L. & Glachant, J-M., Electricity Network Regulation in the EU: The Challenges Ahead for Transmission and Distribution, Edward Elgar, 2018
- Saguan, M. & Meeus, L., Impact of the regulatory framework for transmission investments on the cost of renewable energy in the EU, Energy Economics, 2014, Vol. 43, pp. 185–194
- Meeus, L., Purchała, K., & Belmans, R., Development of the internal electricity market in Europe, Electricity Journal, 2005, Vol. 18, No. 6, pp. 25–35
