= Jean Meeus =

Belgian meteorologist and amateur astronomer

Jean Meeus (born 12 December 1928) is a Belgian meteorologist and astronomer specializing in celestial mechanics, spherical astronomy, and mathematical astronomy.

Meeus studied mathematics at the University of Leuven in Belgium, where he received the Degree of Licentiate in 1953. From then until his retirement in 1993, he was a meteorologist at Brussels Airport.

== Awards and honors ==
In 1986, he won the Amateur Achievement Award of the Astronomical Society of the Pacific. The main belt asteroid 2213 Meeus was named after him by the International Astronomical Union in 1981 for his contributions to the field.

== Publications ==
- Tables of Moon and Sun (Kessel-Lo: Kesselberg Sterrenwacht, 1962)
- Syzygies Tables (Kessel-Lo: Kesselberg Sterrenwacht, 1963)
- co-author (with Carl C. Grosjean & Willy Vanderleen) of Canon of Solar Eclipses (Oxford: Pergamon Press, 1966)
- co-author (with Frederick Pilcher) of Tables of Minor Planets (1973)
- Astronomical Formulae for Calculators (1979) [1st ed.]
  - Astronomical Formulæ for Calculators (1982), 2nd ed. Enlarged and revised, Willmann-Bell Inc, ISBN 0-943396-01-8
  - Astronomical Formulæ for Calculators (1985), 3rd ed. Enlarged and revised, Willmann-Bell Inc, ISBN 0-943396-09-3
  - Astronomical Formulæ for Calculators (1988), 4th ed. Enlarged and revised, Willmann-Bell Inc, ISBN 0-943396-22-0
  - Astronomical Formulas for Microcalculators (1988) (Russian Edition, Moscow, "Mir", 1988)
- co-author (with Hermann Mucke) of Canon of Lunar Eclipses: -2000 to +2526 (Astronomisches Büro, 1979) Bibcode:1979cle..book.....M
- co-author (with Hermann Mucke) of Canon of Solar Eclipses -2003 to +2526 (Astronomisches Büro, 1983)
- Astronomical Tables of the Sun, Moon and Planets (1983) ISBN 0-943396-02-6
  - Astronomical Tables of the Sun, Moon and Planets (1995), 2nd ed., ISBN 0-943396-45-X
  - Astronomical Tables of the Sun, Moon and Planets (2016), 3rd ed., ISBN 1-942675-03-8
- Elements of Solar Eclipses 1951-2200 (1989) ISBN 0-943396-21-2
- Transits (1989)
- Astronomical Algorithms (1991), 1st ed., ISBN 0-943396-35-2
  - Astronomical Algorithms (1998), 2nd ed., ISBN 0-943396-61-1
- Mathematical Astronomy Morsels (1997) ISBN 0-943396-51-4
- More Mathematical Astronomy Morsels (2002) ISBN 0-943396-74-3
- Mathematical Astronomy Morsels III (2004) ISBN 0-943396-81-6
- Mathematical Astronomy Morsels IV (2007) ISBN 978-0-943396-87-3
- Mathematical Astronomy Morsels V (2009) ISBN 978-0-943396-92-7
- co-author (with Fred Espenak) of Five Millennium Canon of Solar Eclipses: -1999 to +3000 (October 2006), NASA Technical paper 2006-214141 2006
- co-author (with Fred Espenak) of Five Millennium Canon of Lunar Eclipses: -1999 to +3000 (January 2009), NASA Technical paper 2009-214172 2009

Preceded by Gregg Thompson & Robert Evans	Amateur Achievement Award of Astronomical Society of the Pacific; 1986	Succeeded by Clinton B. Ford
