= 2181 Fogelin =

Asteroid

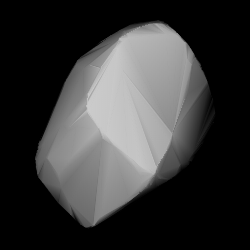
- Shape model of Fogelin from its lightcurve

Discovery
- Discovered by: K. Reinmuth
- Discovery site: Heidelberg Obs.
- Discovery date: 28 December 1942

Designations
- Named after: Eric S. Fogelin (MPC staff member)
- Alternative designations: 1942 YA · 1952 HC_{2} 1975 VF_{9}
- Minor planet category: main-belt · (middle); Eunomia

Orbital characteristics
- Epoch 23 March 2018 (JD 2458200.5)
- Uncertainty parameter 0
- Observation arc: 75.08 yr (27,422 d)
- Aphelion: 2.8986 AU
- Perihelion: 2.2836 AU
- Semi-major axis: 2.5911 AU
- Eccentricity: 0.1187
- Orbital period (sidereal): 4.17 yr (1,523 d)
- Mean anomaly: 354.25°
- Mean motion: 0° 14^{m} 10.68^{s} / day
- Inclination: 13.007°
- Longitude of ascending node: 17.286°
- Argument of perihelion: 116.18°

Physical characteristics
- Mean diameter: 10.067±0.109 km 10.420±0.089 km 11.29±0.85 km 11.55 km (calculated)
- Synodic rotation period: 14.07±0.01 h
- Geometric albedo: 0.200±0.031; 0.21 (assumed); 0.2376±0.0548; 0.252±0.046
- Spectral type: S (assumed)
- Absolute magnitude (H): 12.0 · 12.10

2181 Fogelin (prov. designation: 1942 YA) is an Eunomia asteroid from the central regions of the asteroid belt, approximately 11 kilometers (7 miles) in diameter. It was discovered on 28 December 1942, by Germany astronomer Karl Reinmuth at the Heidelberg Observatory in southwest Germany. In 1980, it was named for Eric S. Fogelin an assistant at the Minor Planet Center. The likely elongated S-type asteroid has a rotation period of 14.07 hours.

== Orbit and classification ==
Fogelin is a member of the Eunomia family (502), a prominent family of stony asteroid and the largest one in the intermediate main belt with more than 5,000 known members. It orbits the Sun in the central main-belt at a distance of 2.3–2.9 AU once every 4 years and 2 months (1,523 days; semi-major axis of 2.59 AU). Its orbit has an eccentricity of 0.12 and an inclination of 13° with respect to the ecliptic. The body's observation arc begins at Heidelberg with its official discovery observation in December 1942.

== Naming ==
This minor planet was named by Brian Marsden and Conrad Bardwell of the Minor Planet Center, after their assistant, Eric S. Fogelin. During 1979–1980, he was preparing the center's computerized data and helped publishing the Minor Planet Circulars. The official naming citation was published by the Minor Planet Center on 1 August 1980 (M.P.C. 5451).

== Physical characteristics ==
Fogelin is an assumed S-type asteroid, in line with the overall spectral type seen among Eunomian asteroids. Near-IR spectroscopy at the NASA Infrared Telescope Facility with the SpeX instrument showed that the asteroid contains mafic minerals, which are rich in magnesium and iron.

=== Rotation period ===
In March 2010, a rotational lightcurve of Fogelin was obtained from photometric observations by Richard Durkee at the Shed of Science Observatory (H39) in the United States. Lightcurve analysis gave a well-defined rotation period of 14.07 hours with a brightness amplitude of 0.57 magnitude, indicative of an elongated shape (U=3).

=== Diameter and albedo ===
According to the surveys carried out by the Japanese Akari satellite and the NEOWISE mission of NASA's Wide-field Infrared Survey Explorer, Fogelin measures between 10.067 and 11.29 kilometers in diameter and its surface has an albedo between 0.200 and 0.252. The Collaborative Asteroid Lightcurve Link assumes an albedo of 0.21 – derived from 15 Eunomia, the family's parent body and namesake – and calculates a diameter of 11.55 kilometers based on an absolute magnitude of 12.0.
