= First Romanesque =

10th-11th century European art and architectural style

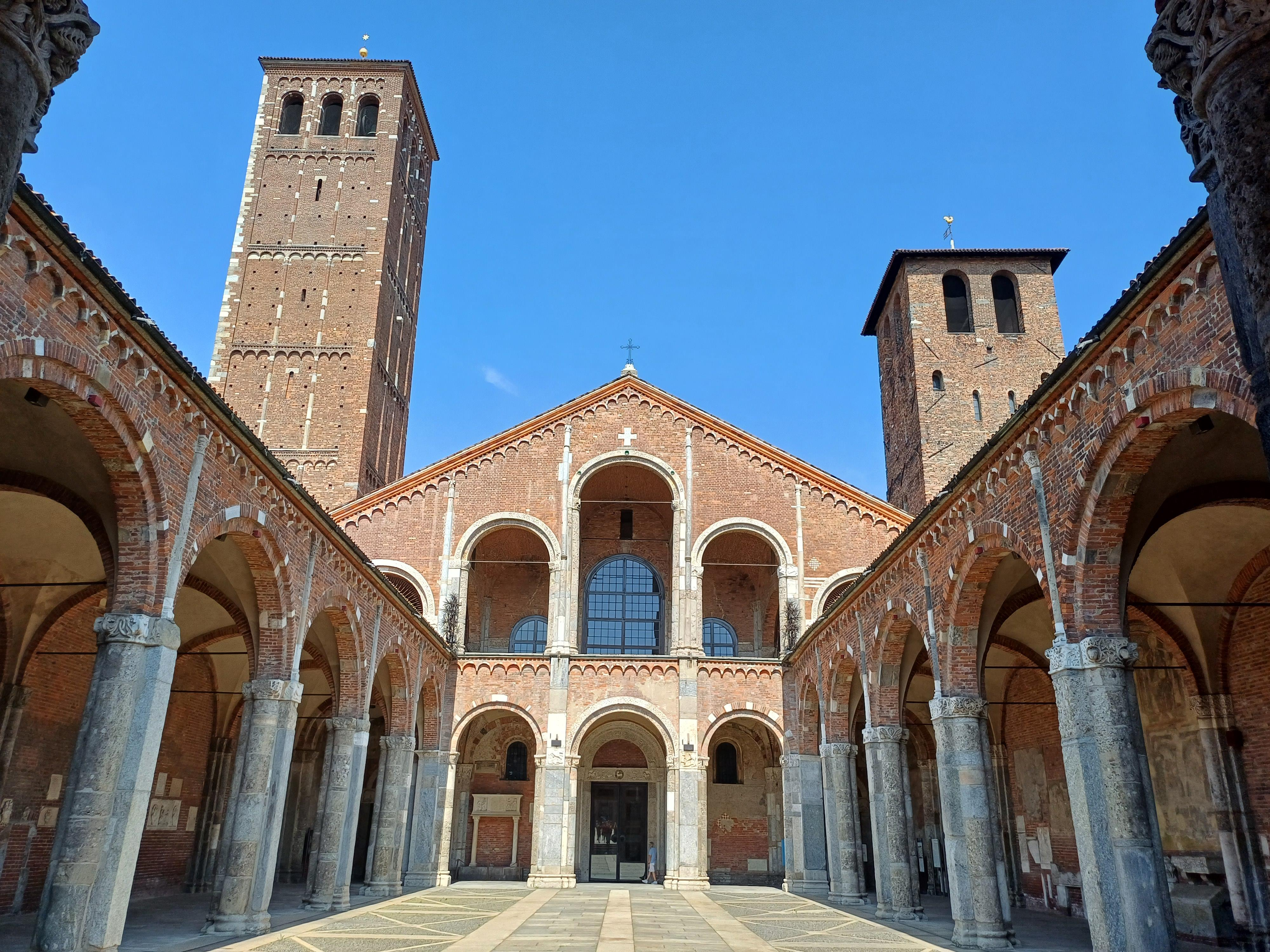
Basilica of Sant'Ambrogio in Milan, Lombardy, brick architecture from the 6th to the 12th centuries

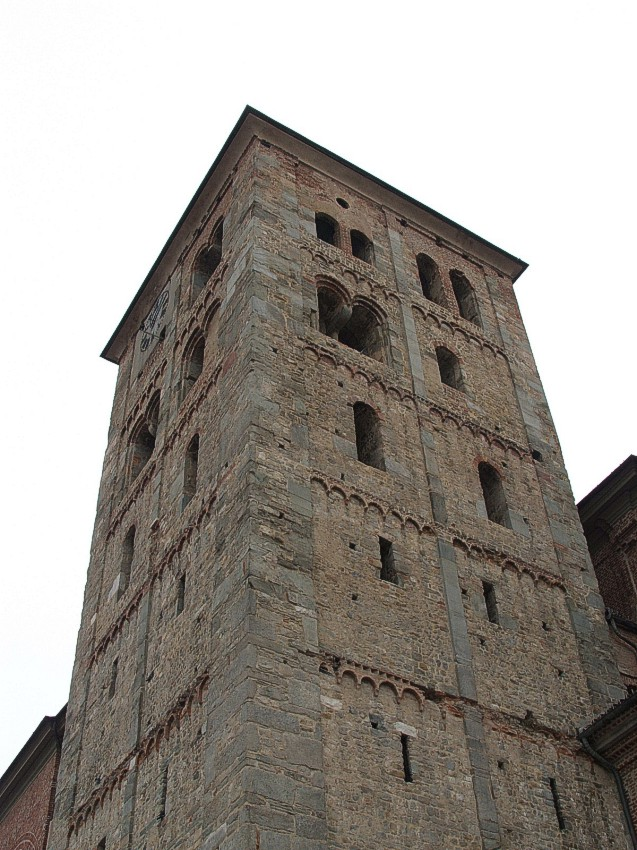
Bell tower of the abbey of Fruttuaria, 11th century, near Ivrea, Piedmont

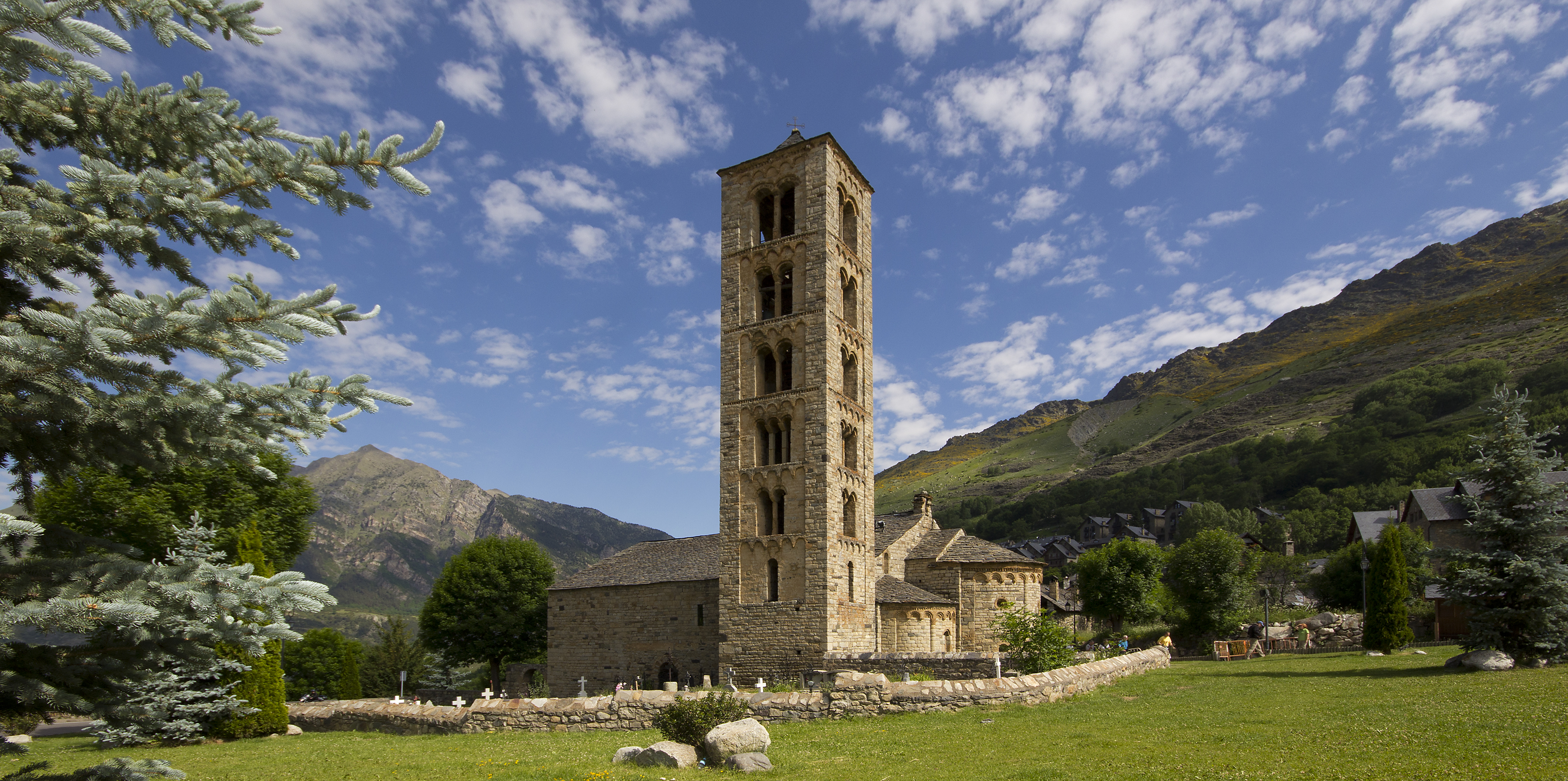
Saint Clement of Taüll in Catalonia, Spain.

One of the first streams of Romanesque architecture in Europe from the 10th century and the beginning of 11th century is called First Romanesque, or Lombard Romanesque. It took place in the region of Lombardy (at that time the term encompassing the whole of Northern Italy) and spread into Catalonia and into the south of France. Its principal decoration for the exterior, bands of ornamental blind arches are called Lombard bands. It was characterized by thick walls and lack of sculpture in facades, and with interiors profusely painted with frescoes.

== Historical and geographical background ==
During the first quarter of the 11th century, much architectural activity by groups composed of Lombard teachers and stonemasons (Comacine Guild), who worked throughout much of Europe and Catalan territories and erected fairly uniform temples, some of which still exist today. For a considerable area this process of craft diffusion started in Lombardy and Lombardus became the word for mason at an early period. One might call the First Romanesque style the style of this Italian architectural reconquest. The large promoter and sponsor of this art in Catalonia was Oliva, monk and abbot of the monastery of Ripoll who, in 1032, ordered the extension of the body of this building with a façade with two towers, plus a transept which included seven apses, all decorated on the outside with the Lombardic ornamentation of blind arches and vertical strips.

The geographical proximity of this Iberian region to the rest of Europe, resulted in depictions of the emerging Romanesque art being brought to Catalonia. While the art failed to take root in the rest of the Iberian Peninsula until the second third of the 11th century, there are numerous examples of its presence in Catalan counties before this time. Though this style may not be considered fully Romanesque, the area contained many of the defining characteristics of this artistic style.

== Recognition and terminology ==
Catalan architect Josep Puig i Cadafalch suggested that what was formerly considered the late form of pre-Romanesque architecture in Catalonia bore features of Romanesque and thus classified it as First Romanesque (primer romànic). The First Romanesque churches of the Vall de Boí were declared a World Heritage Site by UNESCO in November 2000.

To avoid the term Pre-Romanesque, which is often used with a much broader meaning than is generally suited to refer to early Medieval and early Christian art, and in Spain may also refer to the Visigothic, Asturias, Mozarabic and Repoblación art forms, Puig i Cadafalch preferred to use the term "First Romanesque" or "first Romanesque art" to designate those Catalan anticipations of the Romanesque itself.

== List of First Romanesque buildings ==
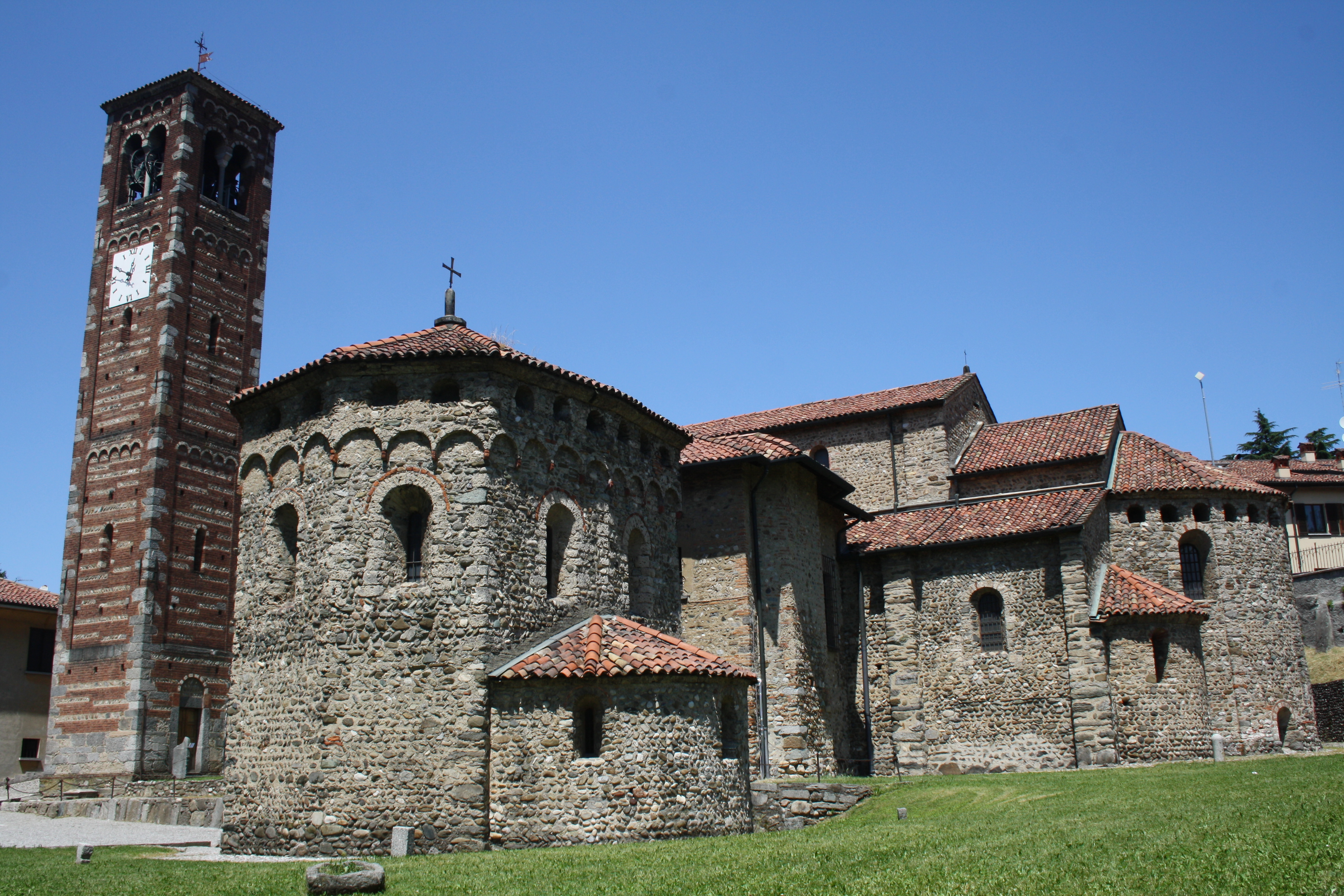
Basilica dei Santi Pietro e Paolo in Agliate, Lombardy near Monza built in 875, considered to be the first church of Lombard Romanesque

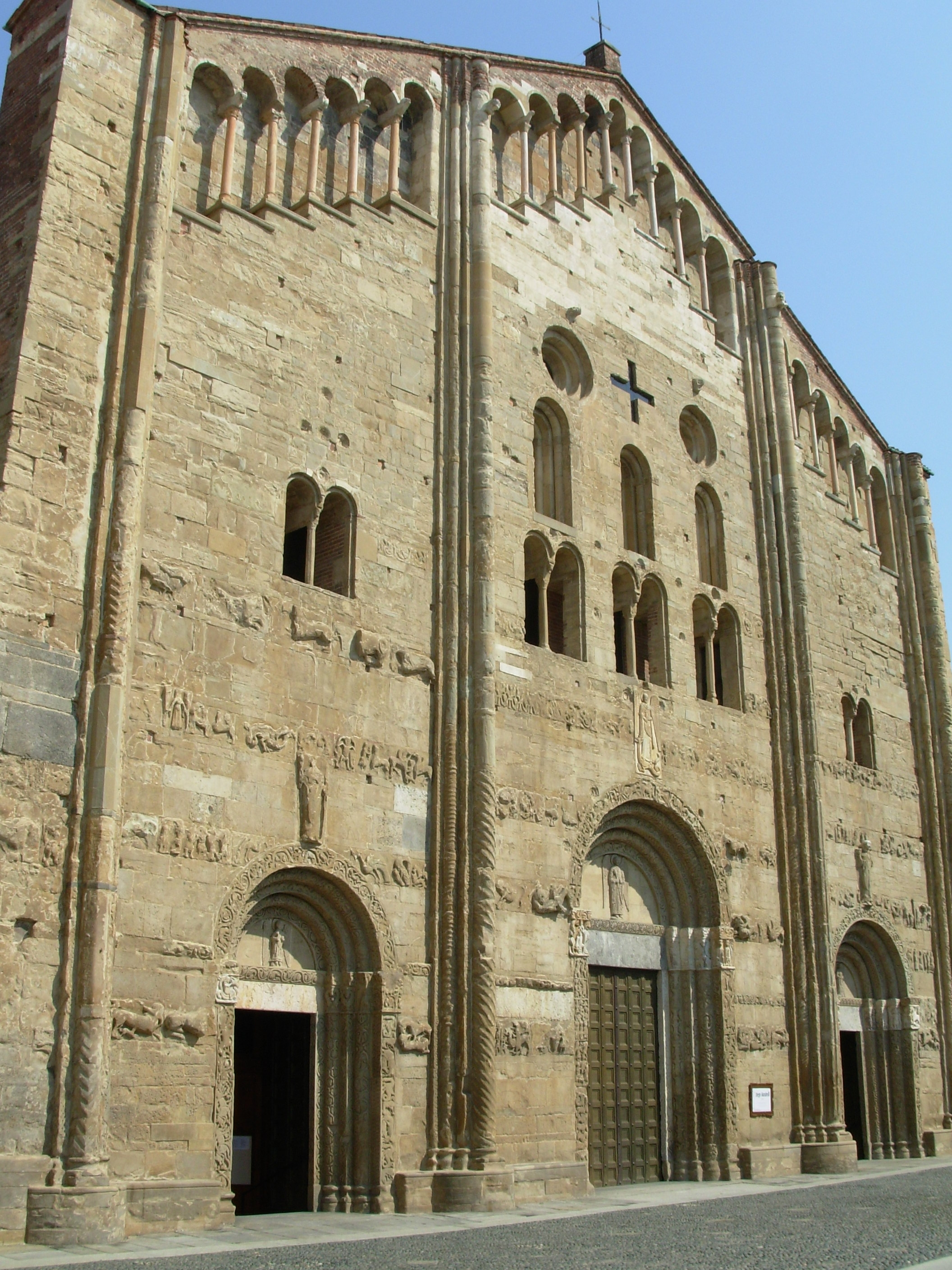
San Michele Maggiore, Pavia

=== Italy ===
Lombardy

- Basilica dei Santi Pietro e Paolo in Agliate near Monza
- Priorato di Sant'Egidio in Sotto il Monte
- Basilica di Santa Giulia in Bonate Sotto
- Piona Abbey near Lecco
- Santa Maria Maggiore, Lomello
- Sant'Ambrogio in Milan c. 1048
- San Michele Maggiore, Pavia
- San Pietro in Ciel d'Oro in Pavia
- San Teodoro in Pavia
- Rotonda di San Tomè in Almenno San Bartolomeo
- Basilica of Sant'Abbondio in Como
- Basilica di San Vincenzo in Cantù
- Rotonda di San Lorenzo in Mantua
- San Vincenzo in Prato in Milan

Emilia-Romagna

- Modena Cathedral
- Nonantola Abbey
- Fidenza Cathedral
- Piacenza Cathedral
- Parma Cathedral

=== Spain ===
Catalonia

- Sant Pere de Roda, founded 943, started construction c. 950
- Ripoll Monastery. Finished and consecrated in 977
- Sant Vicenç in Cardona, started in 1029 and consecrated in 1040
- Sant Cristòfol of Beget
- Sant Pere of Besalú
- Sant Vicenç of Besalú
- Monastery of Sant Miquel, Cruïlles
- Sant Vicenç of Espinelves
- Part of Girona Cathedral
- Monastery of Sant Pere de Galligans in Girona
- Sant Nicolau in Girona
- Saint Cecil of Molló
- Church of Sant Joan in Palau-saverdera
- Monastery of Sant Quirze de Colera in Rabós d'Empordá
- Monastery of Sant Aniol d'Aguja
- Monastery of Santa Maria of Vilabertran
- Churches of Saint Mary and Saint Clement of Taüll, Sant Feliu, Sant Joan de Boí, Santa Maria de l'Assumpció, Santa Maria de Cardet, la Nativitat de Durro, Ermita de Sant Quiric and Santa Eulàlia, in Vall de Boí,
- Churches of Santa Maria, Sant Pere and Sant Miquel in Terrassa
- Church of Saints Just and Pastor, in Son (Pallars Sobirà)

Huesca

- Church of San Caprasio in Santa Cruz de la Serós (Huesca)
- Monastery of San Pedro de Siresa (Huesca)
- Church of San Adrián de Sasave (Huesca)
- Church of Baros (Huesca)
- Church of Asieso (Huesca)
- Church of Binacua (Huesca)
- Churches of the Serrablo (Huesca), it is debatable whether they are First Romanesque or Mozarab: Ordovés, Rasal, Lasieso, Arto, Isún, Satué, Lárrade, San Juan de Busa, Oliván, Orós Bajo, Susín, Basarán (now in Formigal), Otal, S. Juan de Espierre and San Bartolomé de Gavín

Valladolid

- Nuestra Señora de la Anunciada Hermitage, in Urueña

=== France ===
- Church of Saint-Étienne, Vignory 1050–1057
- St Philibert at Tournus
- Saint-Martin-du-Canigou, begun 1001

== See also ==
- Iberian pre-Romanesque art and architecture
- List of architectural styles
- Wiligelmo
- Benedetto Antelami

== Sources ==
- Armi, Edson. Orders and Continuous Orders in Romanesque Architecture., Department of Art, University of Chicago. Oct 1975. pp. 73–188.
- Kostof, Spiro. A History of Architecture., Oxford: Oxford University Press, 1995.
- Chueca Goitia, Fernando Historia de la Arquitectura Española, Edad Antigua y Media Editorial DOSSAT, 1965. Chapter: El primer arte románico. pp. 148–156. ISBN 84-923918-4-7
- Chueca Goitia, Fernando Historia de la Arquitectura occidental: Edad Media cristiana en España Ed. DOSSAT, 2000. ISBN 84-95312-35-2
- Yarza, Joaquín Arte y arquitectura en España, 500-1250 Manuales arte Cátedra, 1997. ISBN 84-376-0200-9
