= Castle of Cardona =

Building in Cardona, Catalonia, Spain

Coordinates: 41°54′51.93″N 1°41′8.01″E

- Castell de Cardona
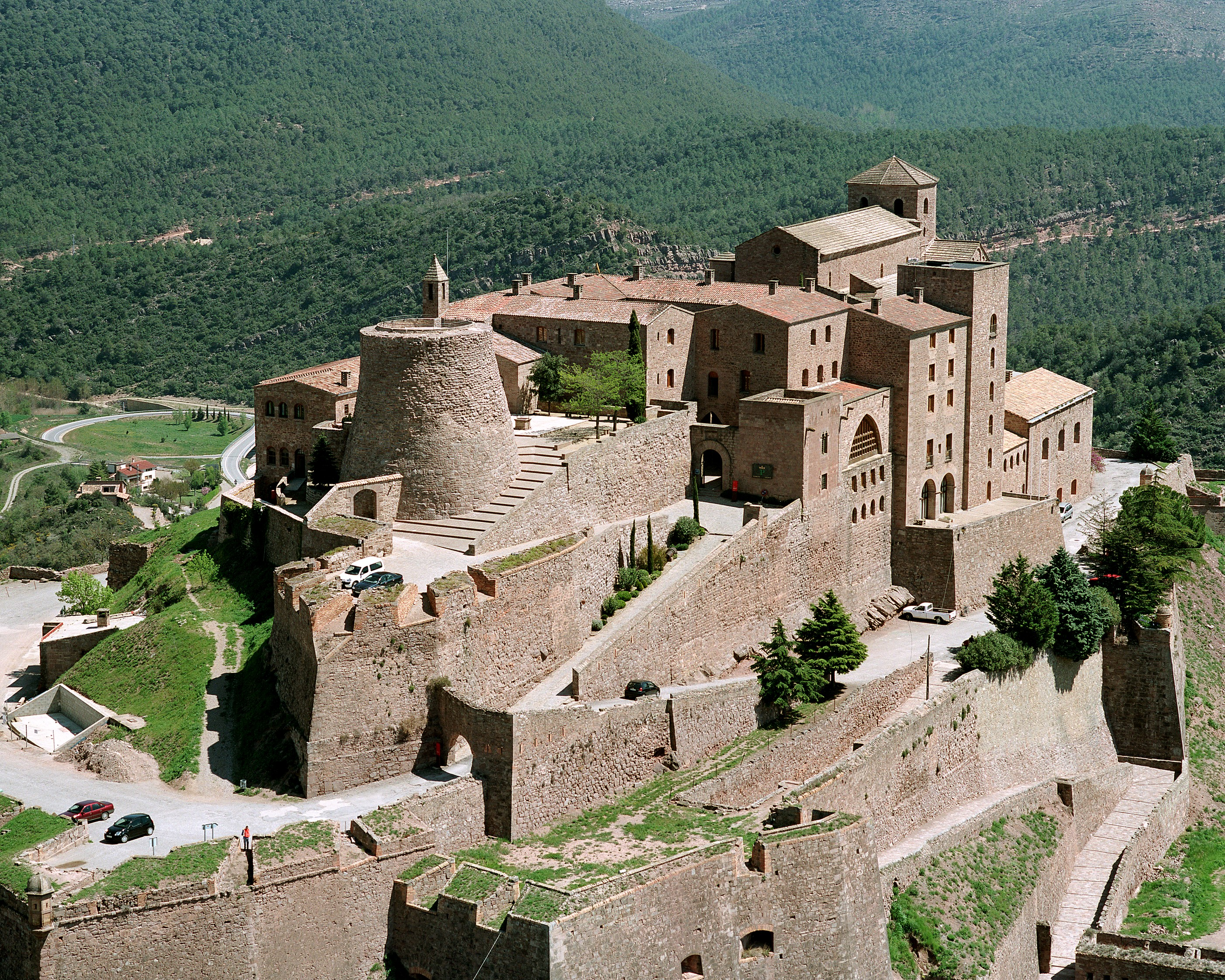
- The Castle of Cardona viewed from the air
- Alternative names: Parador de Cardona
- Hotel chain: Paradores

General information
- Location: Cardona (Barcelona), Spain

Website
- Parador de Cardona

Spanish Cultural Heritage
- Type: Non-movable
- Criteria: Monument
- Designated: 23 January 1992
- Reference no.: RI-51-0005236

The Castle of Cardona (Catalan: Castell de Cardona, IPA: [kəsˈteʎ də kəɾˈðonə]) is a medieval fortress in Catalonia, Spain. Situated on a hill overlooking the river valley of the Cardener and the town of Cardona. The fortress was initially constructed by Wilfred the Hairy in 886; it is now a hotel belonging to the state-owned Paradores chain.

== History ==
During the 14th century, Wilfred's heirs and successors, the dukes of Cardona, came from the most important family related to the Crown of Aragon, second only to the royal house itself. Because of this, they were called "kings without crowns", as they had extensive territories in Catalonia, Aragon, and Valencia, and dynastic ties with Castile, Portugal, Sicily, and Naples. This presumably increased the importance of the castle. In 1714, even after a Bourbon siege destroyed a good part of the castle's walls, the garrison was one of the last to surrender to the Bourbon troops which supported Philip V.

== Architecture ==
The castle's architecture features both the Romanesque and Gothic styles. Its principal rooms include the Sala Dorada ('golden room') and the Sala dels Entresols ('mezzanine room'). The castle's main jewel is the 11th-century Torre de la Minyona ('maiden's tower'), a tower which measures 15 metres (49 ft) in height and 10 metres (33 ft) in diameter. The church of Sant Vicenç, adjacent to the fort proper, is in the Lombard Romanesque style.

The portico of the Church of St. Vincenç in Cardona was once covered with murals. Fragments of these "painted vaults" were restored in 1960 and are now displayed at the Museu Nacional d'Art de Catalunya in Barcelona.

== See also ==
- Catalonia
- House of Barcelona, dynasty that held the Crown of Aragon from 1162 until 1410
- House of Trastámara, a Crown of Castile royal line that held the Crown of Aragon, 1412−1555

== Bibliography ==
- Pedrosa, Andreu (2001). The Castle of Cardona. Sant Vincenç de Castellet: Farell. ISBN 84-930418-8-2
