= Bonate =

Bonate may refer to places in Italy:

- Bonate Sopra, a municipality in the province of Bergamo
- Bonate Sotto, a municipality in the province of Bergamo
