= Filmoteca de Catalunya =

Film archive in Catalunya, Spain

Coordinates: 41°22′36.33″N 2°10′32.67″E

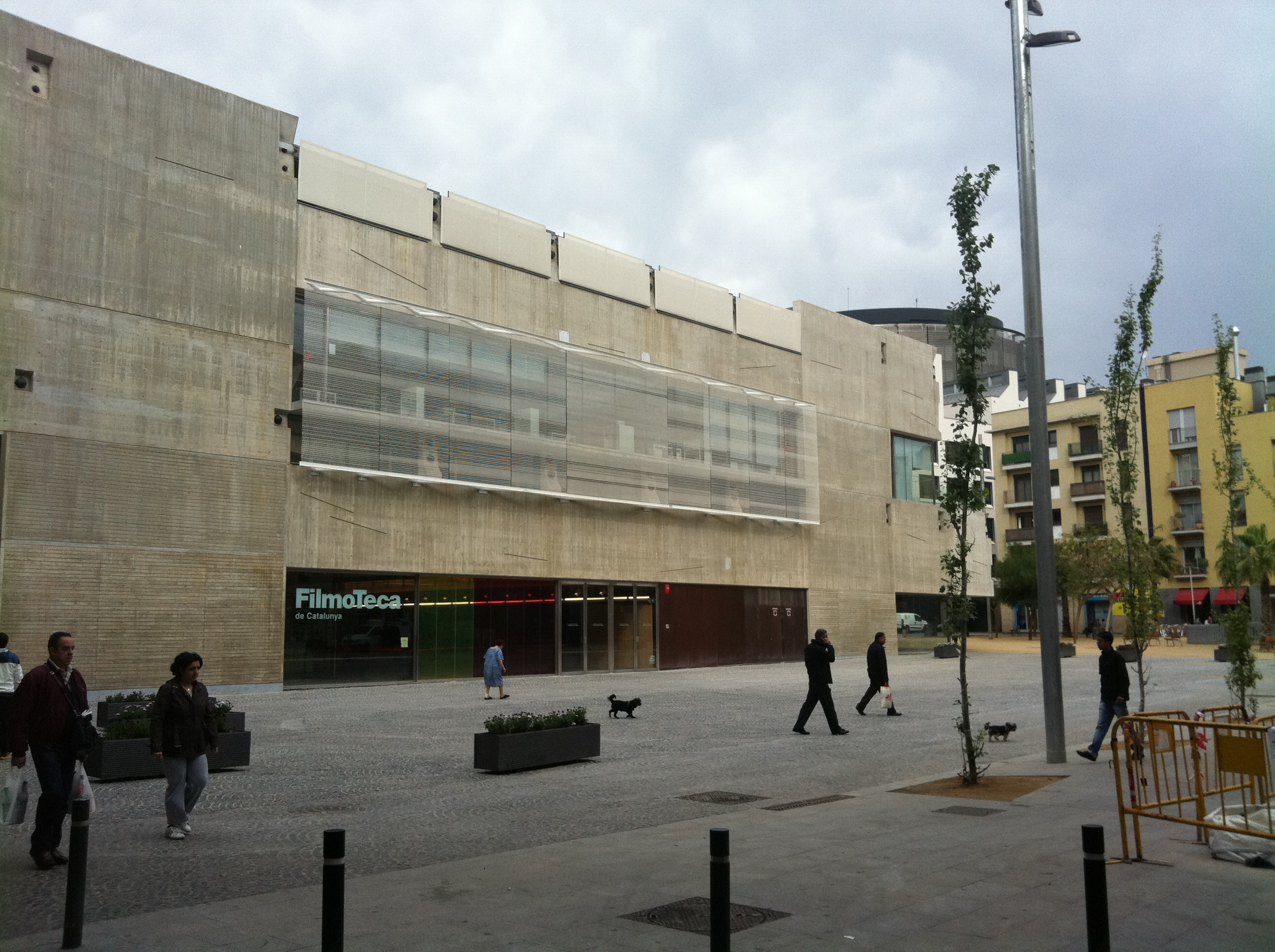
- Filmoteca de Catalunya's Headquarters in Barcelona
- Type: Film, Cinema, Film Archive, Film Library
- Purpose: Film Archive, Film Library
- Headquarters: Barcelona (Library and Exhibition Halls) and Terrassa (Film Archive)
- Location: Catalonia
- Official language: Catalan
- General Manager: Esteve Riambau
- Director, Film Archive: Mariona Bruzzo
- Director, Film Library: Antoni Espadas
- Staff: 50 (2017)
- Website: www.filmoteca.cat

The Filmoteca de Catalunya is a film archive located in Catalunya, Spain, aiming at the preservation of film and the dissemination of audiovisual and film culture. The head office and public rooms (cinemas, exhibition rooms, library) are located in the Raval neighbourhood, in central Barcelona. The Centre de Conservació i Restauració (the institution's Center for Conservation and Restoration) is located in the Parc Audiovisual in Terrassa.

== History ==
The Filmoteca de Catalunya did not exist as such until 1981. Instead, from 1963 to 1981 it was the Spanish Filmoteca's branch in Barcelona. In 1981, once a democratic regime had been re-established in Spain, the Spanish Filmoteca transferred its responsibilities and cultural competences to the Generalitat de Catalunya, which then created the Filmoteca de Catalunya. Since its foundation, the Filmoteca de Catalunya has been under the auspices of the Culture Department of the Catalan government.

For some years, the Filmoteca de Catalunya's main activity was the daily screening of worldwide and Catalan films. Yet efforts were soon made to create a film collection. Consequently, a Film Archive, now called Centre de Conservació i Restauració (Centre for Conservation and Restoration), was established in 1992.

Over the course of its history, the Filmoteca de Catalunya has also moved to different venues in Barcelona. Its first theatrical venue was located in Travessera de Gràcia, and in 1991, it moved to an old cinema, the Cinema Aquitània, where it held its screenings for more than twenty years. During this time, the Centre for Conservation and Restoration was located in a different area in Barcelona. In 2012, the Filmoteca de Catalunya relocated to its current headquarters in central Barcelona, and in 2014, the Centre for Conservation and Restoration was opened in Terrassa.

== Filmoteca de Catalunya's activities ==
=== Dissemination of Cinema ===
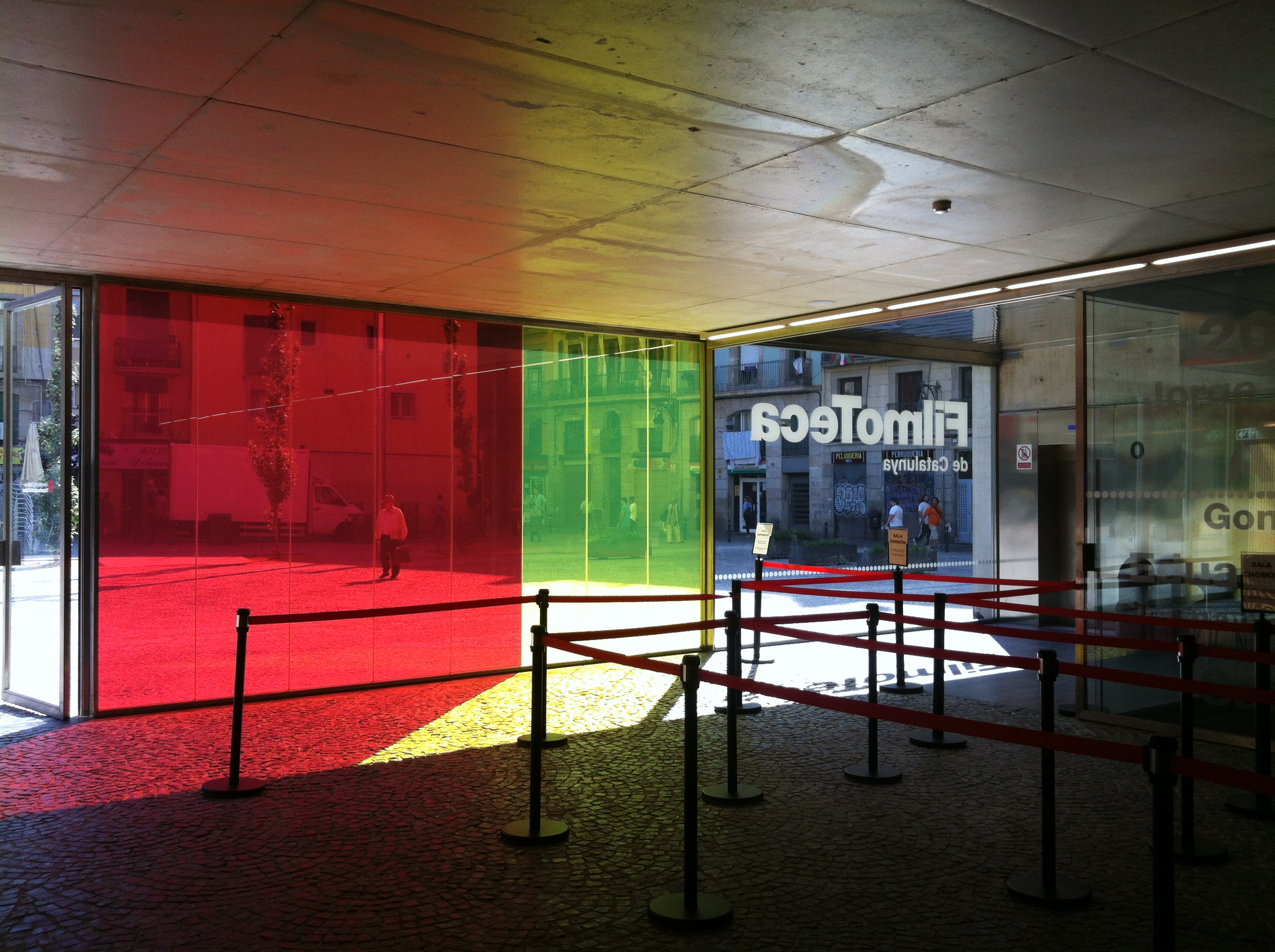
Main hall of the Filmoteca de Catalunya

The promotion and dissemination of cinema and film culture -in particular, of Catalan film heritage- is among the main aims of the Filmoteca de Catalunya. Such an aim is fulfilled through different activities and programs:

- Screenings: the Filmoteca de Catalunya runs two cinema screens, both located in its main headquarters in Barcelona. The Filmoteca shows films from all over the world, particularly critically acclaimed historical and specialized films that may not otherwise get a cinema showing. It also hosts several cinema festivals co-organized with third parties. It distributes films from its collection to other venues across Catalonia and worldwide as well, mainly through partnerships with other institutions.
- Educational programs: the Filmoteca de Catalunya offers a range of educational initiatives and programs, which include courses targeted towards formal and informal school schemes, as well as a program targeted at adults. The Filmoteca de Catalunya also develops workshops and other activities designed to promote audiovisual culture.
- Exhibitions: the Filmoteca de Catalunya organizes temporary exhibits on themes pertaining to cinema, showing both its own collection and outside collections.
- Publications: the Filmoteca de Catalunya publishes a full range of materials designed to foster common knowledge and appreciation of cinema.

=== Film Conservation and Restoration ===
The Filmoteca de Catalunya maintains the largest Catalan film archive, preserved and restored at the Centre for Conservation and Restoration, the Centre de Conservació i Restauració (in Catalan). The archive has more than 170,000 film reels containing nearly 23,500 titles, as well as 41,000 documents. The majority of the collection is Catalan material, but it also features some holdings from around the world. The film holdings of the Filmoteca de Catalunya consist, among other things, of such important collections as: the Catalan Cinema Collection, the Segundo de Chomón Collection, the Laya Films Collection -which includes most of the films shot by the Republican production units during the Spanish Civil War- and several private collections that were donated to the institution.

The main objective of the Centre for Conservation and Restoration is the recovery, preservation, restoration, cataloguing and dissemination of its collection.

=== Film Library ===
The Filmoteca de Catalunya's Film Library, the Biblioteca del Cinema (in Catalan) holds more than 40.000 documents and is part of several Catalan and International library networks and catalogues: the Generalitat de Catalunya's Specialized Libraries Catalogue, the Collective Catalogue of the Catalan Universities and BiblioCi, the international network of Latin American, Caribbean and Spanish information units (documentation centers and libraries) specializing in cinema. The Library was born as a result of the transfer of the Spanish Filmoteca's collection and of the CO.CI.CA (Catalan Cinematographic Collection) collected by Miquel Porter i Moix. The Library also holds the Delmiro de Caralt Collection (formed by cameras and other cinema objects), created by Delmiro de Caralt and Pilar de Quadras in 1924.

=== International Activities ===
The Filmoteca de Catalunya is a member of the International Federation of Film Archives and in April 2013 held the organisation's International Congress in Barcelona, which was attended by more than 300 members of film institutes from 62 different countries.

Since 2014, the Filmoteca de Catalunya has also been one of the venues hosting the simultaneous screening of the European Film Academy Young Audience Award.

In June 2015, the Filmoteca also held an international Seminar on Orson Welles on his centennial, with the participation of several experts in the director's career as well as Chris Welles Feder, Welles' daughter. During the seminar, the Filmoteca de Catalunya organized a special screening of Chimes at Midnight in the Romanesque church of Sant Vicenç in Cardona, where the film was originally shot in 1964. As a result of this screening, in 2016 the church was listed as one of the Treasures of European Film Culture by the European Film Academy.

== See also ==
- List of film archives
- The International Federation of Film Archives
