= Sant Vicenç, Cardona =

Church in Catalonia, Spain

Coordinates: 41°54′52″N 1°41′10″E

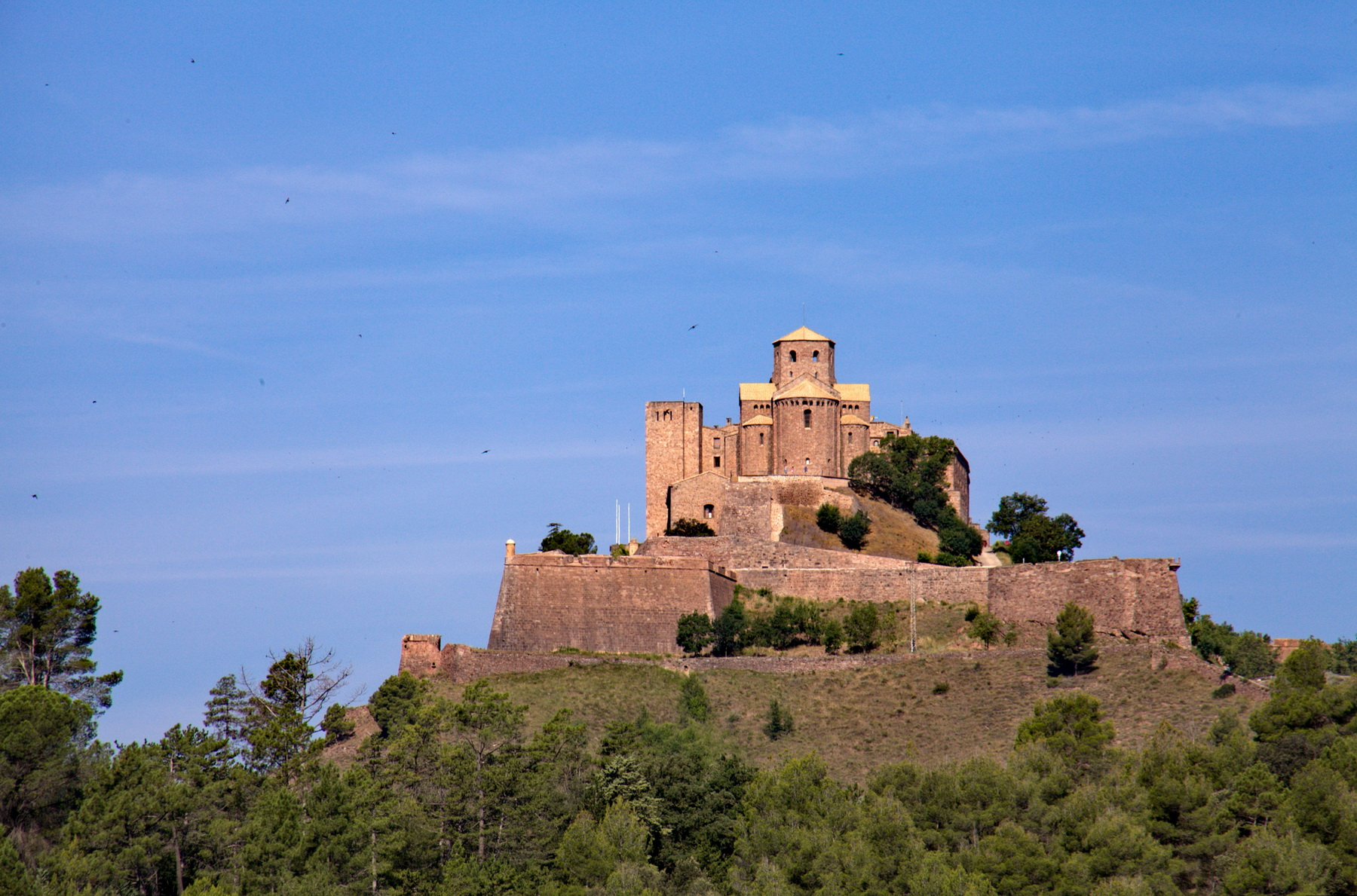
View of the church's apse from afar

The Church of Sant Vicenç of Cardona (Catalan: Església de Sant Vicenç de Cardona) is a Lombard Romanesque church in Cardona, Catalonia, Spain. It was built between the years 1019 and 1040, and is located in the center of the Castle of Cardona.

== History ==
The church has its origins in the chapel of the Castle of Cardona, which was property of House of the Viscounts of Osona. (The family later took their name from this castle.) This first church was documented in 980, and was protected under the patronage of the viscounts.

During the 11th century, a number of stone churches—several as a part of Benedictine monastic complexes—began to be built in the area, though the earliest of these churches still had wooden trusses supporting the roofs. The church of St. Vincent was begun about 1019 and consecrated in 1040, under the patronage of viscount Bermon I.

== Architecture ==
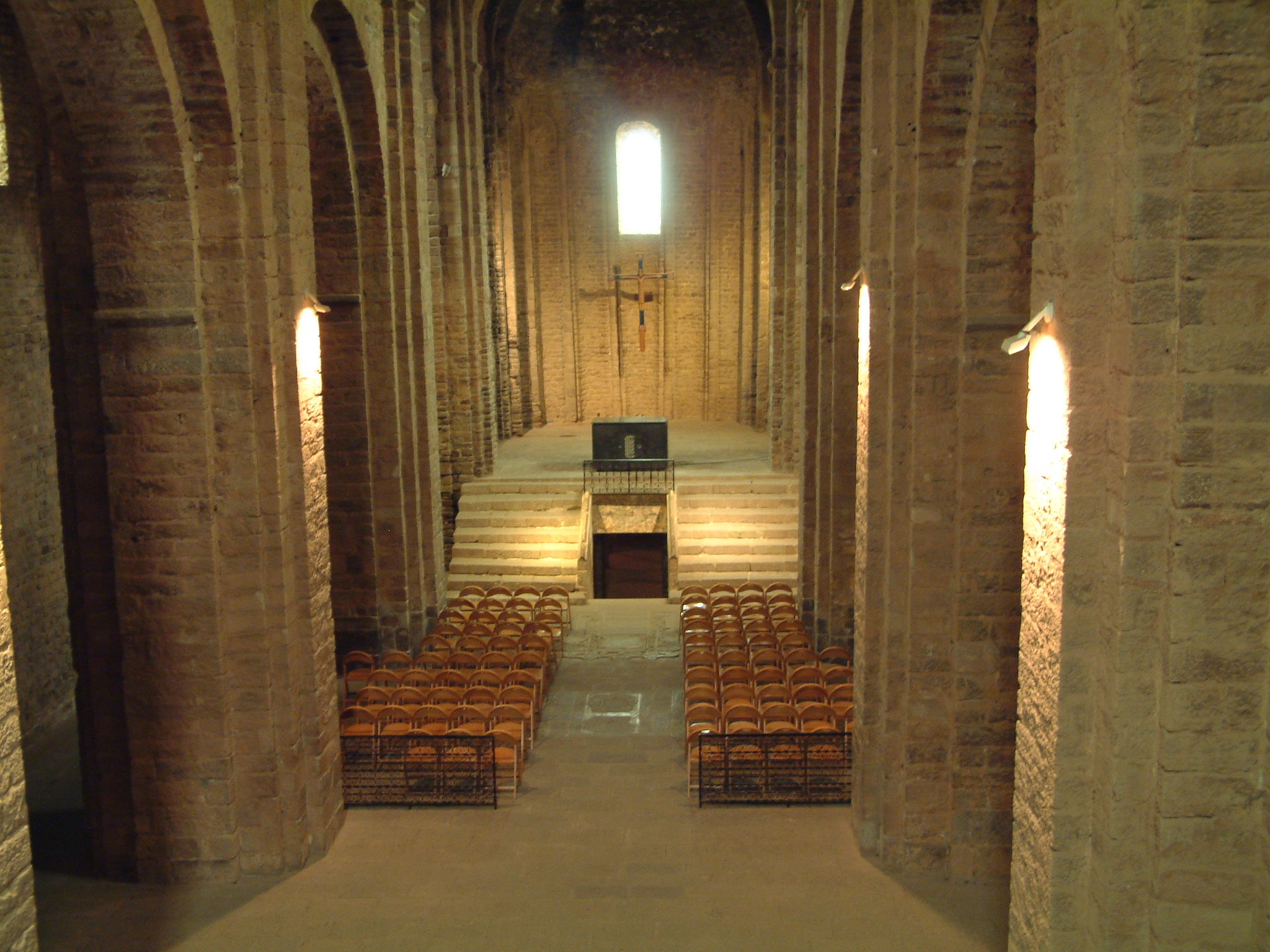
Interior of the church.

The church was built as a showpiece, and is impressive for its scale—with a height of more than 19 m (62 ft). Its building material is cut stone, and the stonework is both austere and sophisticated, given the uniform size of the cut blocks and the quality of the masonry.

=== Interior ===
In the interior, a barrel vault of stone covers the nave, which is flanked by two side-aisles. Along the nave, three transverse arches, which are evenly spaced, add support. Their arches continue down the piers as pilasters, complete with capitals at the springing of the arch. Rounded arches, supported by piers, open into the side aisles, which are covered with stone groin vaults. Above the nave arcade, small rounded lancet-shaped windows pierce the stone walls. The windows are evenly spaced over the arch openings.

A dome resting on squinches is over the crossing in front of the altar. The dome has an oculus opening at the top and small rounded lancet windows in the drum. This is the first known example of a basilica-plan church built with a dome in Western Europe, which represents the synthesis of sacred-building and meeting-hall typologies in the Roman tradition.

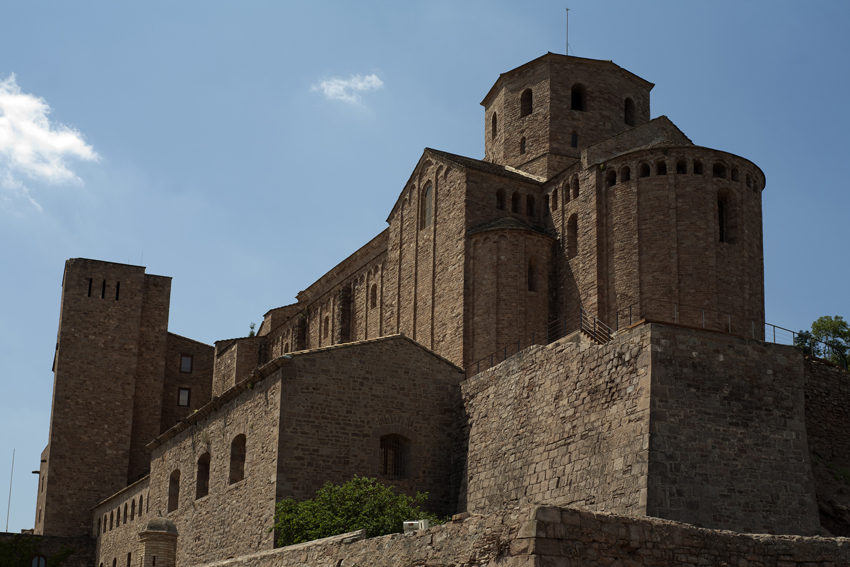
Apses, transept, and lantern tower, with typical Lombard details

At the crossing, the nave meets the transept, which is actually slightly wider than the nave. The transept, however, is short, barely emerging from the sides of the church, but still giving the structure a typical cruciform plan. Beyond it, the aisles of the church terminate in three apses, each sized according to the size of the aisle.

=== Exterior ===
From afar, the church's exterior is notable for the prevailing regularity of straight lines, excepting the three semicircular apses. Above the whole rises an octagonal lantern tower, which corresponds to the interior dome.

== Paintings ==
The portico of the church was once covered with murals. Fragments from the three central vaults (of five) were restored in 1960 and are now displayed at the Museu Nacional d'Art de Catalunya (MNAC) in Barcelona. Though the portico was built with the church in the 11th century, the frescoes themselves date to the 12th century.

== Gallery ==
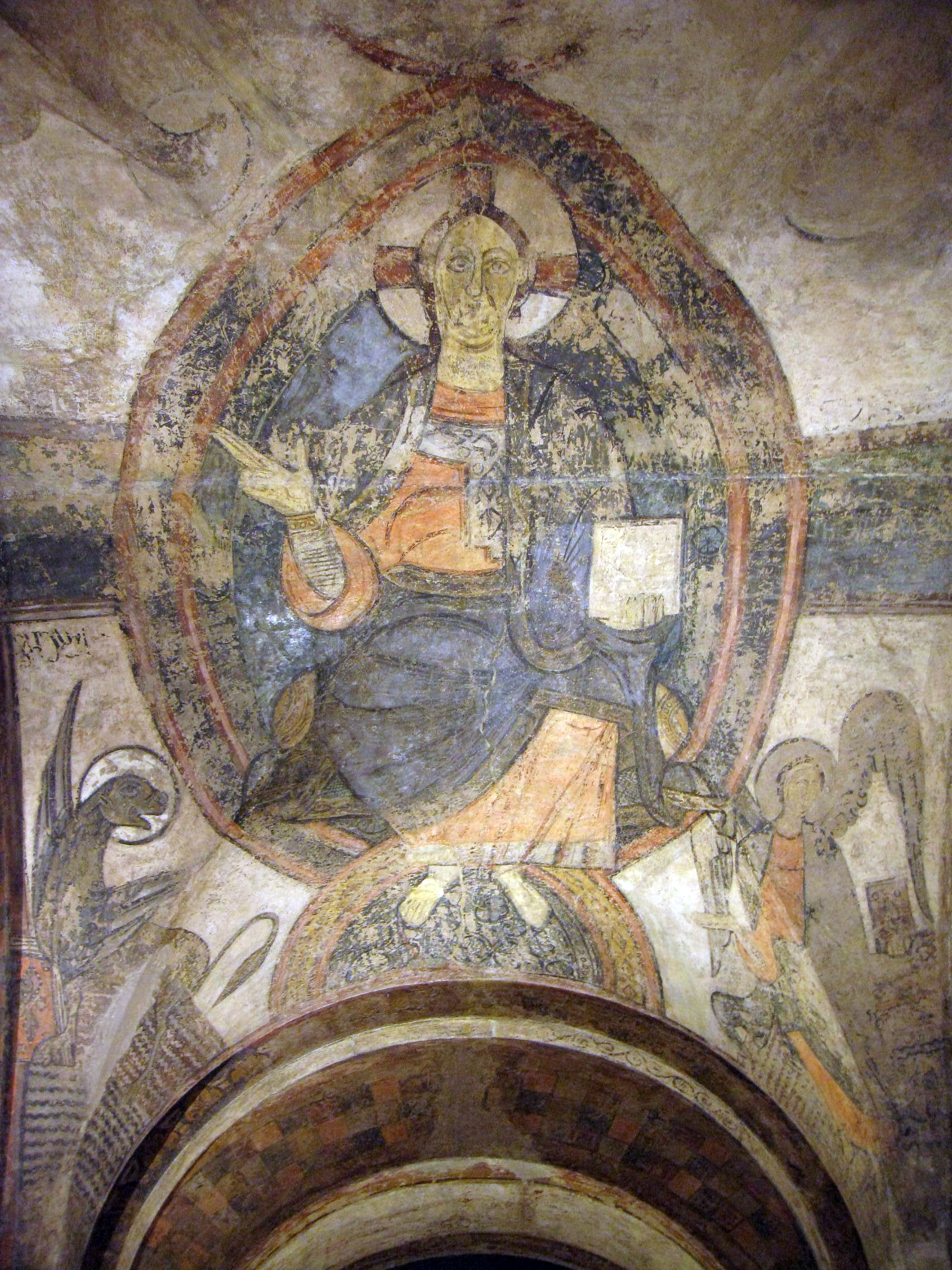
Atrium vault frescoes at MNAC

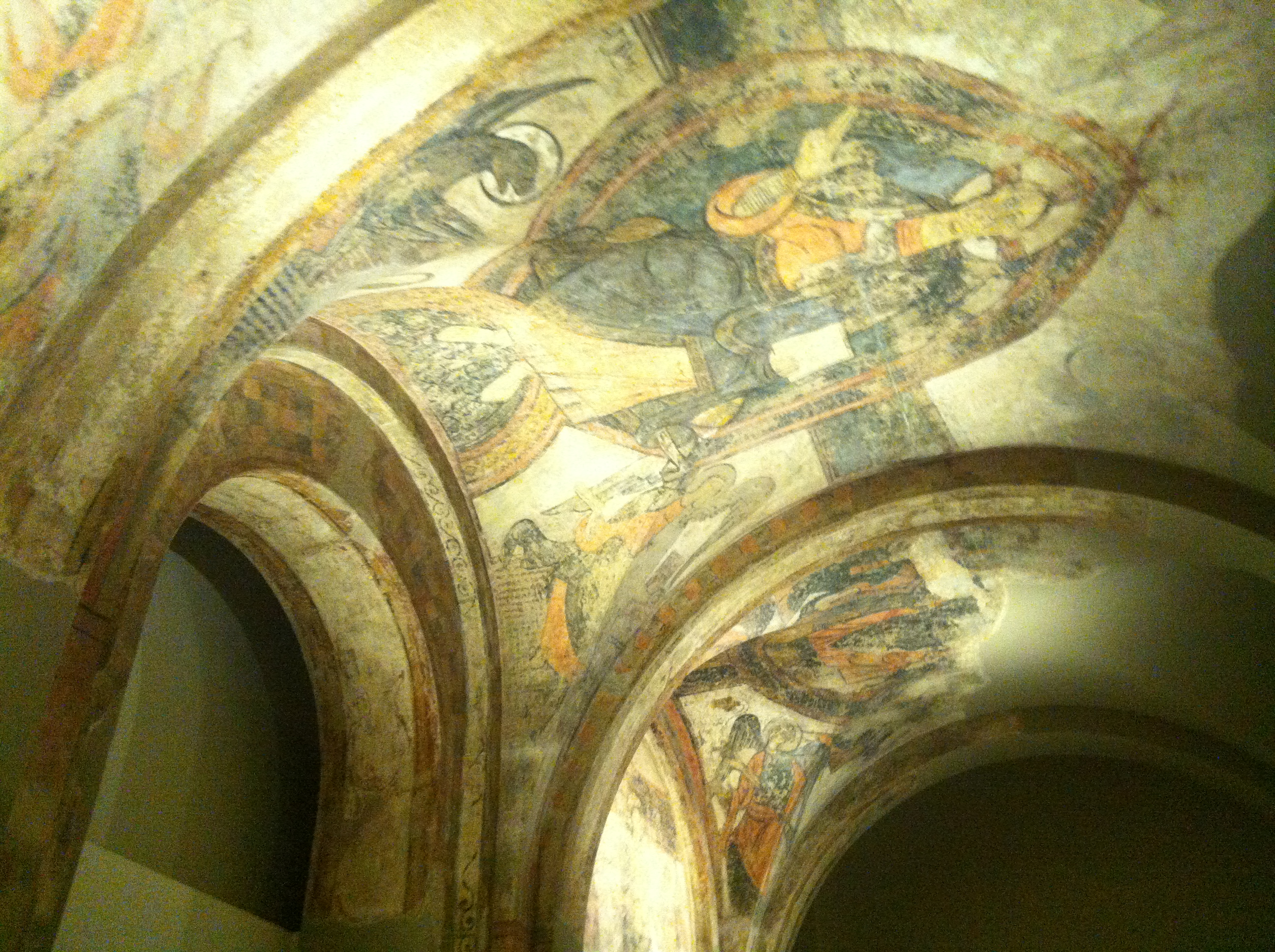
Atrium

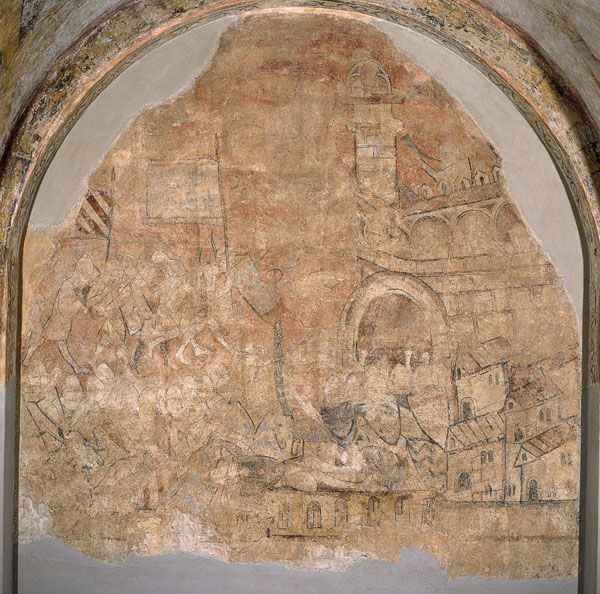
The Defense of Girona

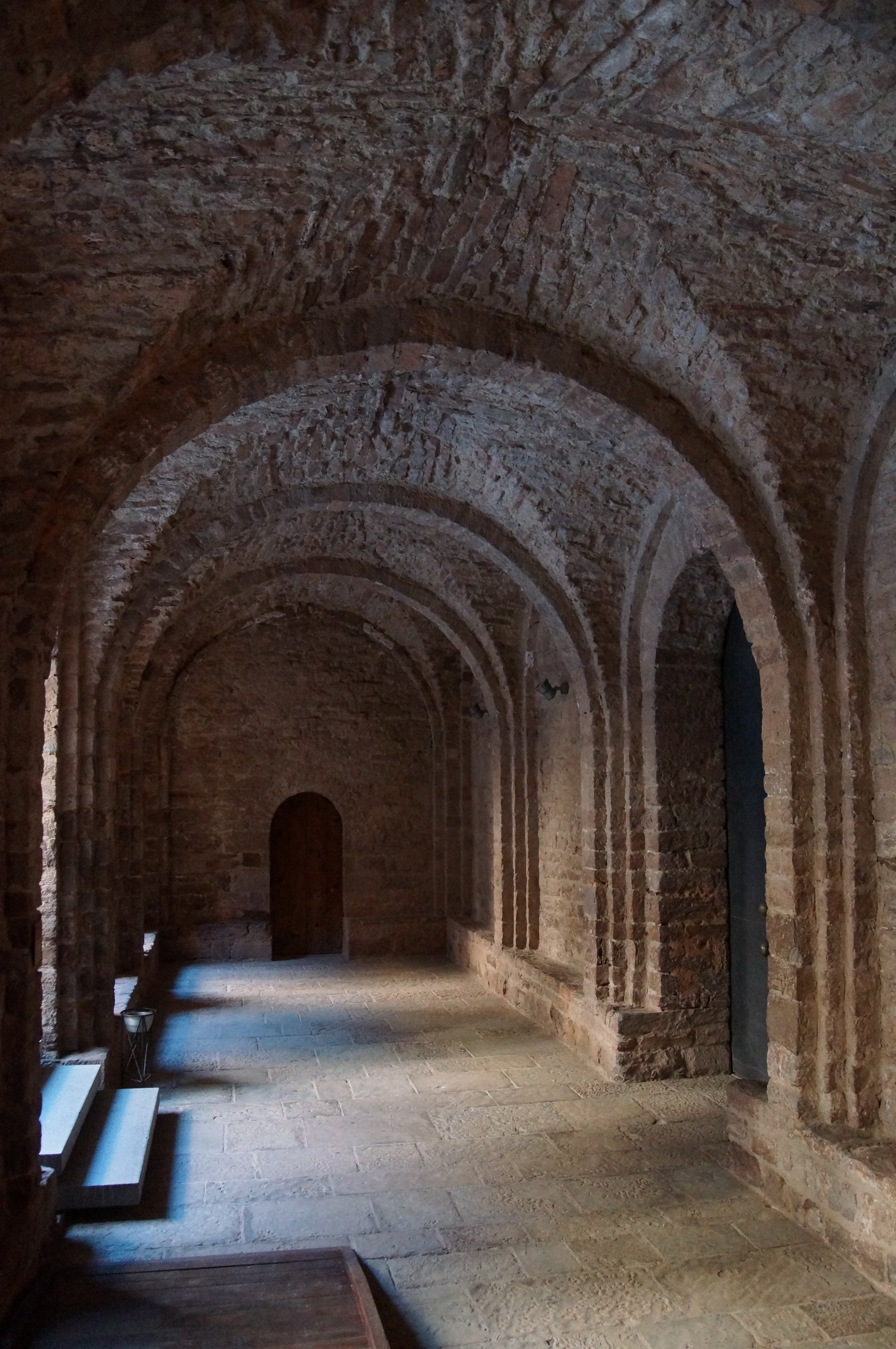
The atrium today

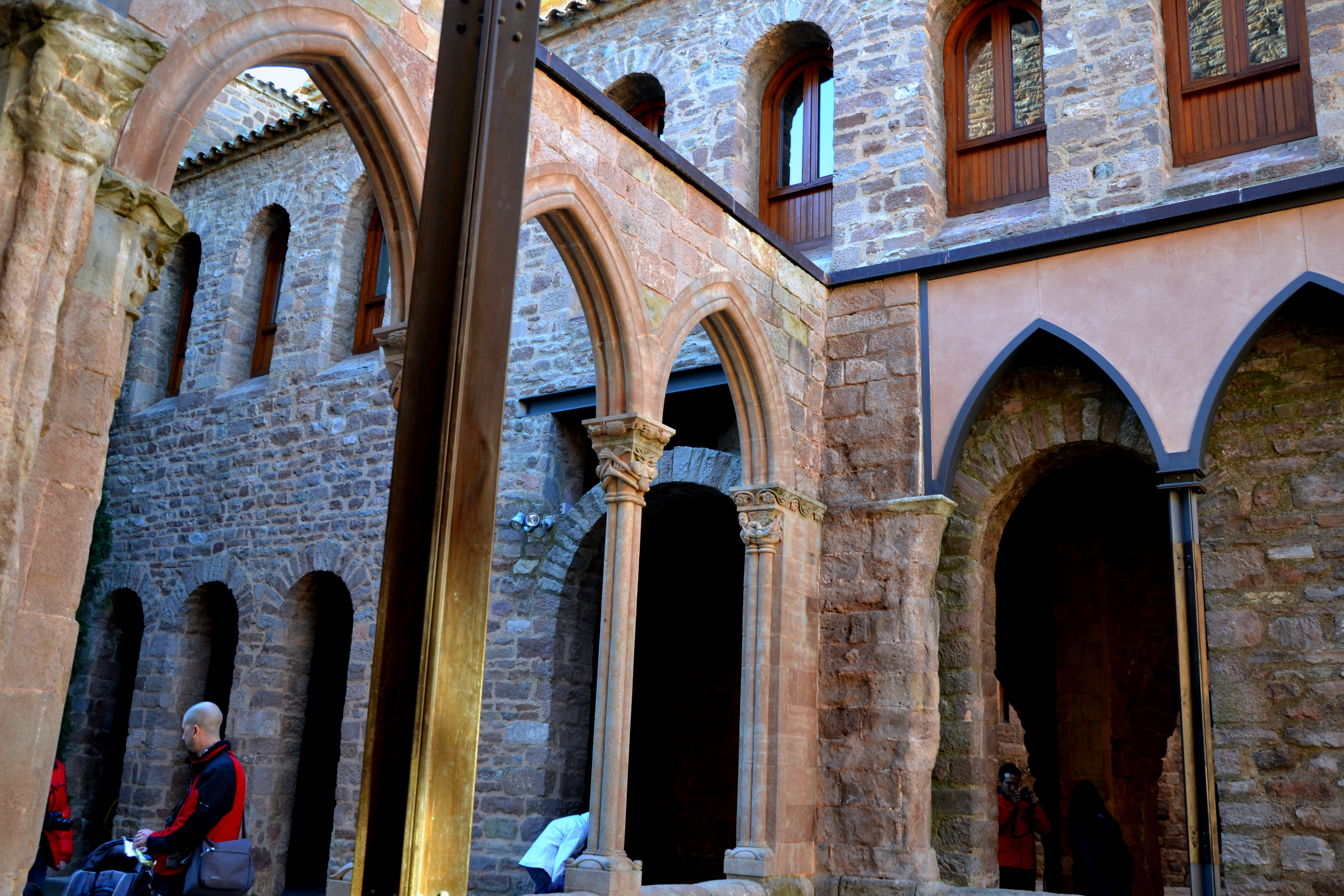
Remains of the cloister

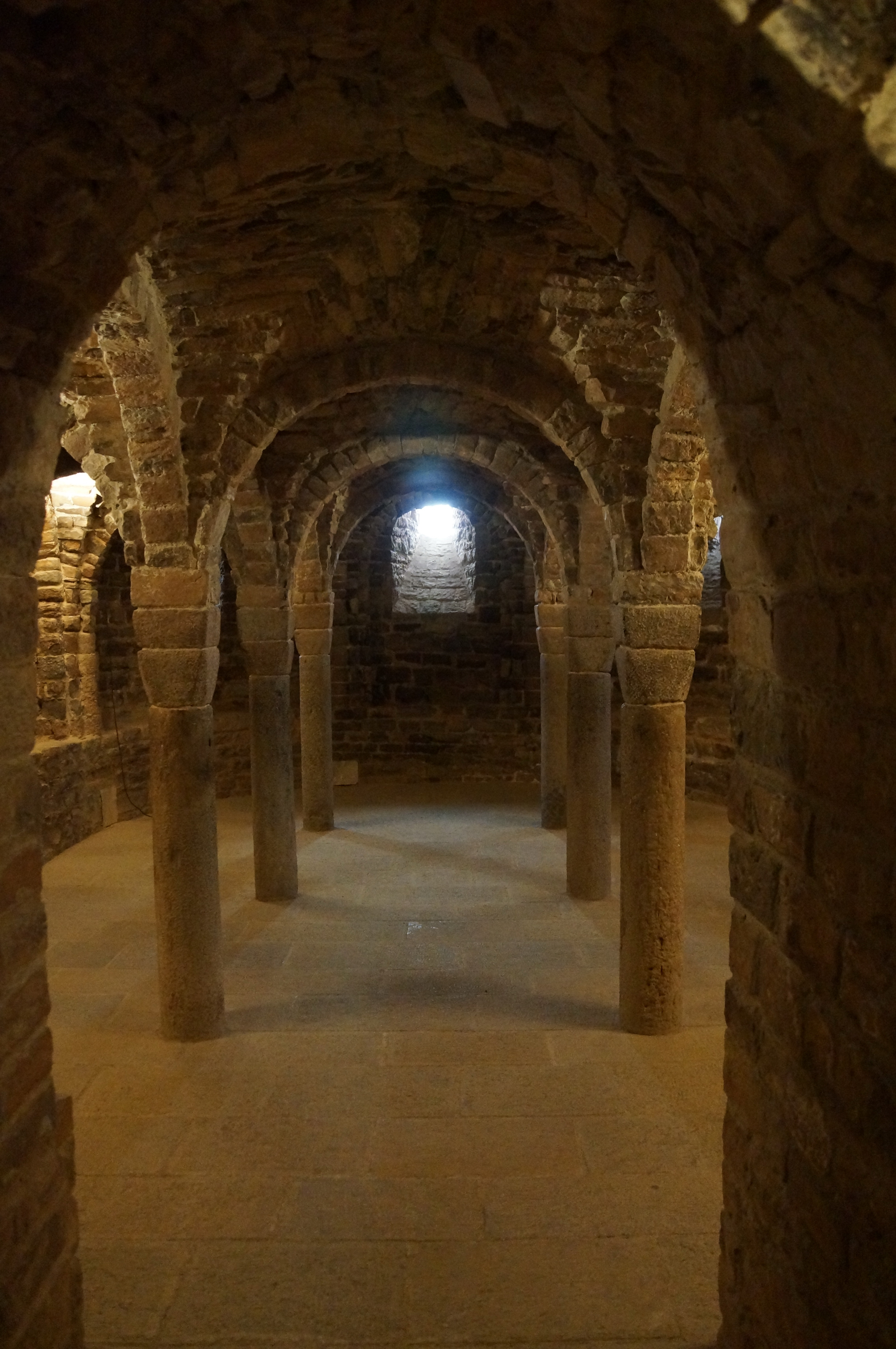
Church crypt

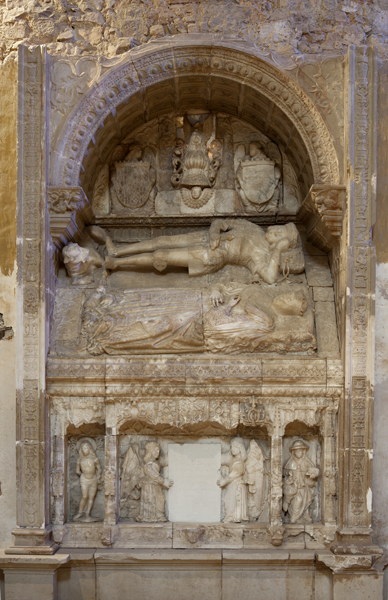
Tomb of the Dukes of Cardona

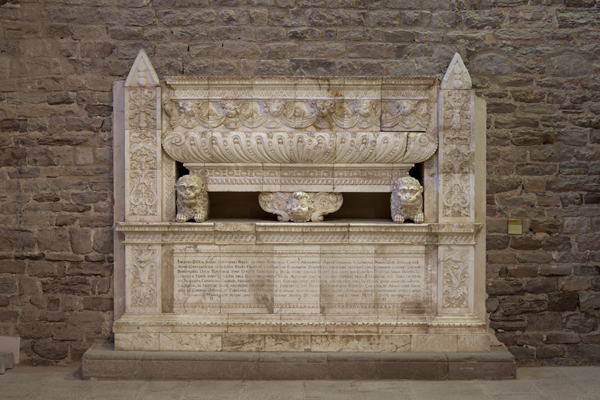
Tomb

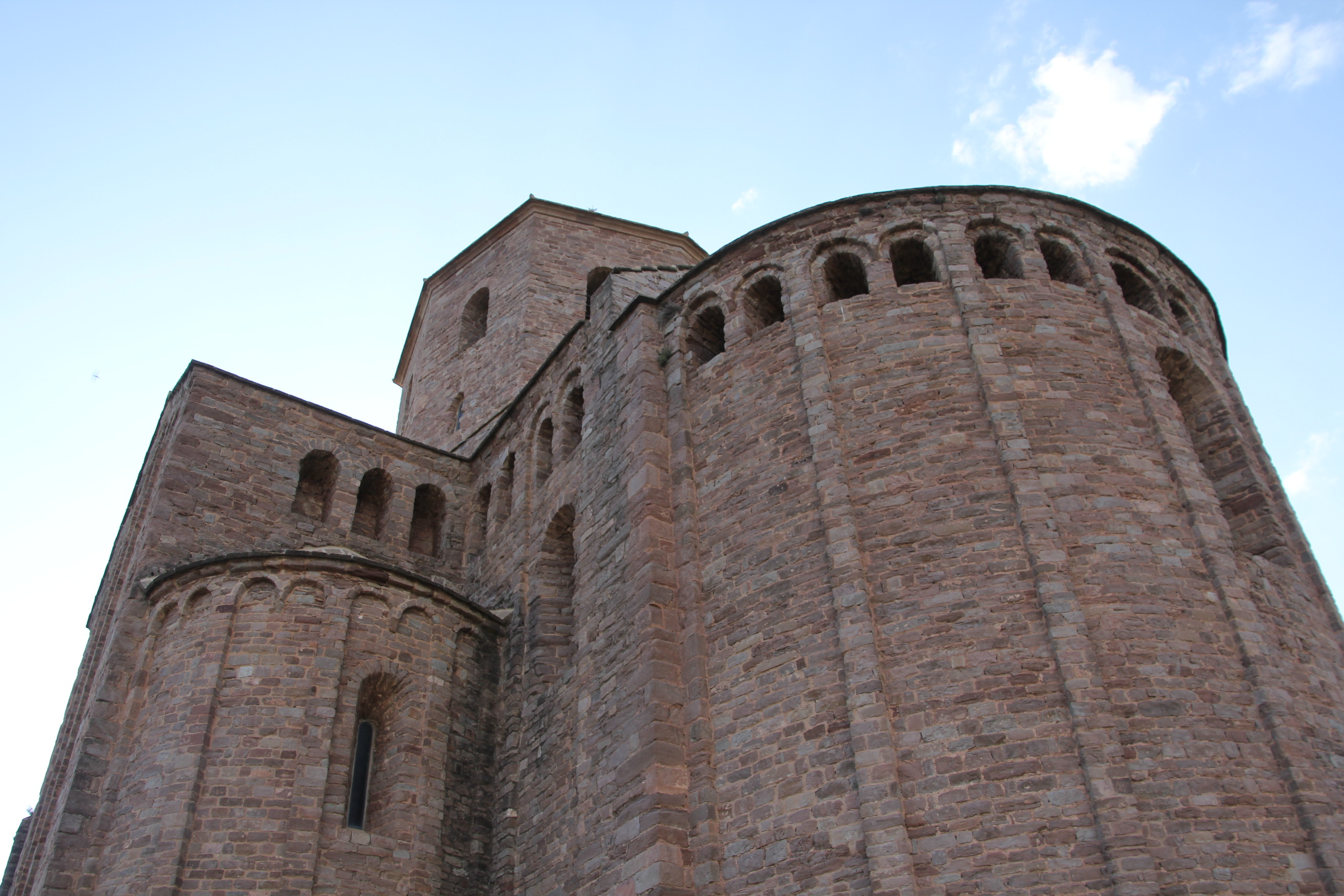
Apse. Note the extensive use of Lombard bands

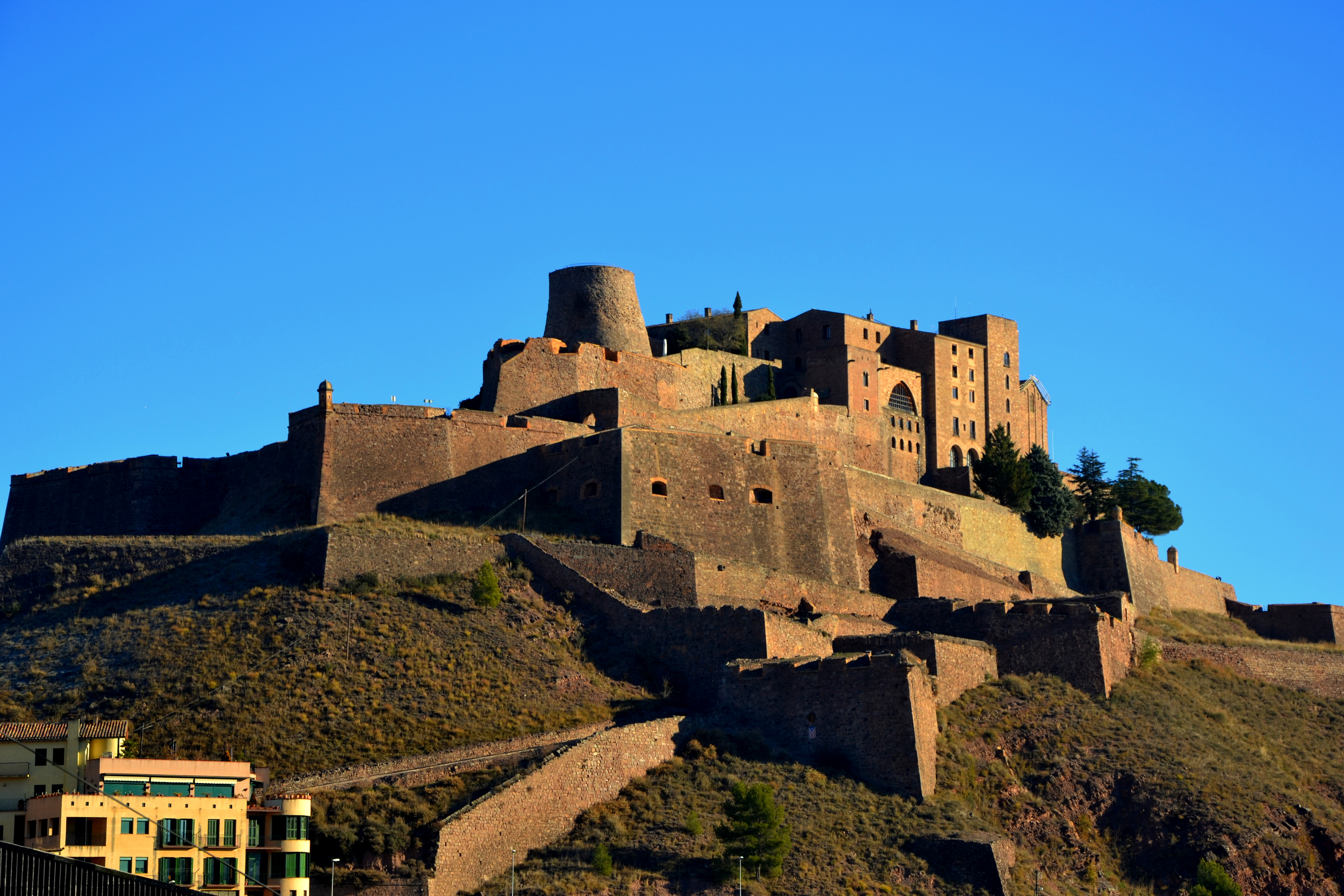
Castle of Cardona

== See also ==
- High medieval domes
