= Basilica di Santa Giulia, Bonate Sotto =

Church building in Italy

Coordinates: 45°39′40″N 9°34′5″E

Basilica of Saint Julia of Corsica Basilica di Santa Giulia
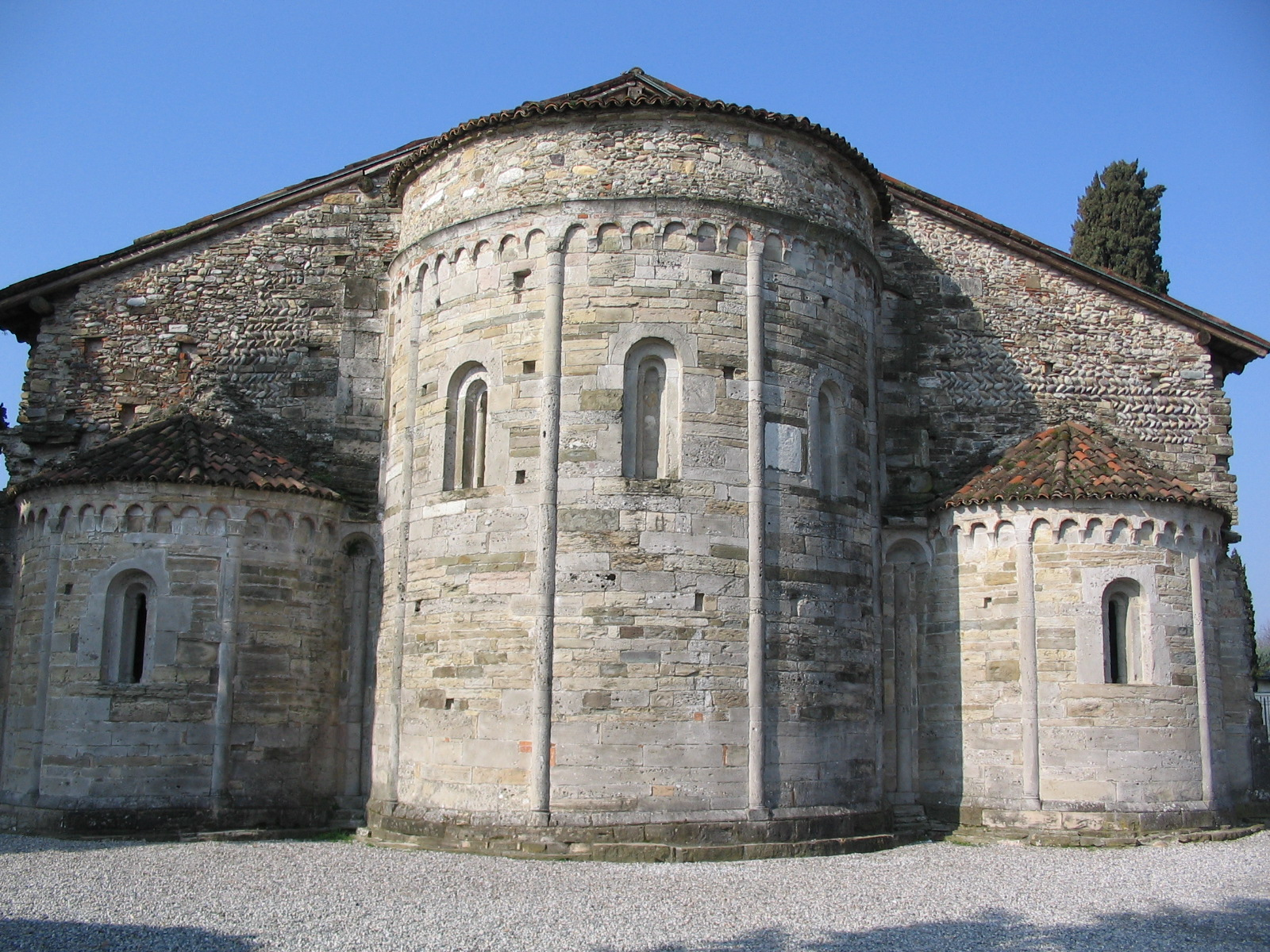
- View of the apse area.

Religion
- Affiliation: Roman Catholic
- Province: Bergamo
- Status: Inactive

Location
- Location: Bonate Sotto, Italy
- Interactive map of Basilica of Saint Julia of Corsica; Basilica di Santa Giulia

Architecture
- Type: Church
- Style: Romanesque

The Basilica di Santa Giulia is a medieval former church in Bonate Sotto, Lombardy, northern Italy. Built in the early 12th century, only its apse area remain today in a short plain outside the town.

== History ==
According to local tradition, it was founded b St. Julia of Corsica or the Lombard queen Theodelinda. It is mentioned in a letter from 1129 by Pope Honorius II as "... the church in Lesina which has not been consecrated yet". An abbey had its centre here, being abandoned together with the church around the 14th century.

== Overview ==
The church had a basilica plan, with a nave and two aisles with three apses; the interior was divided into five bays, of which only the last one preceding the apse area survives. The area without the ceiling is now home to a cemetery. The central apse was frescoed in 1795 by the Swiss painters Baldassarre and Vincenzo Angelo Orelli.

Notable are the sculpted capitals, with geometrical, animal or human figures, while the residual exterior decoration includes small columns and Lombard bands.

== See also ==
- First Romanesque
