= Julia of Corsica =

Catholic saint, virgin, and martyr

Saint Julia
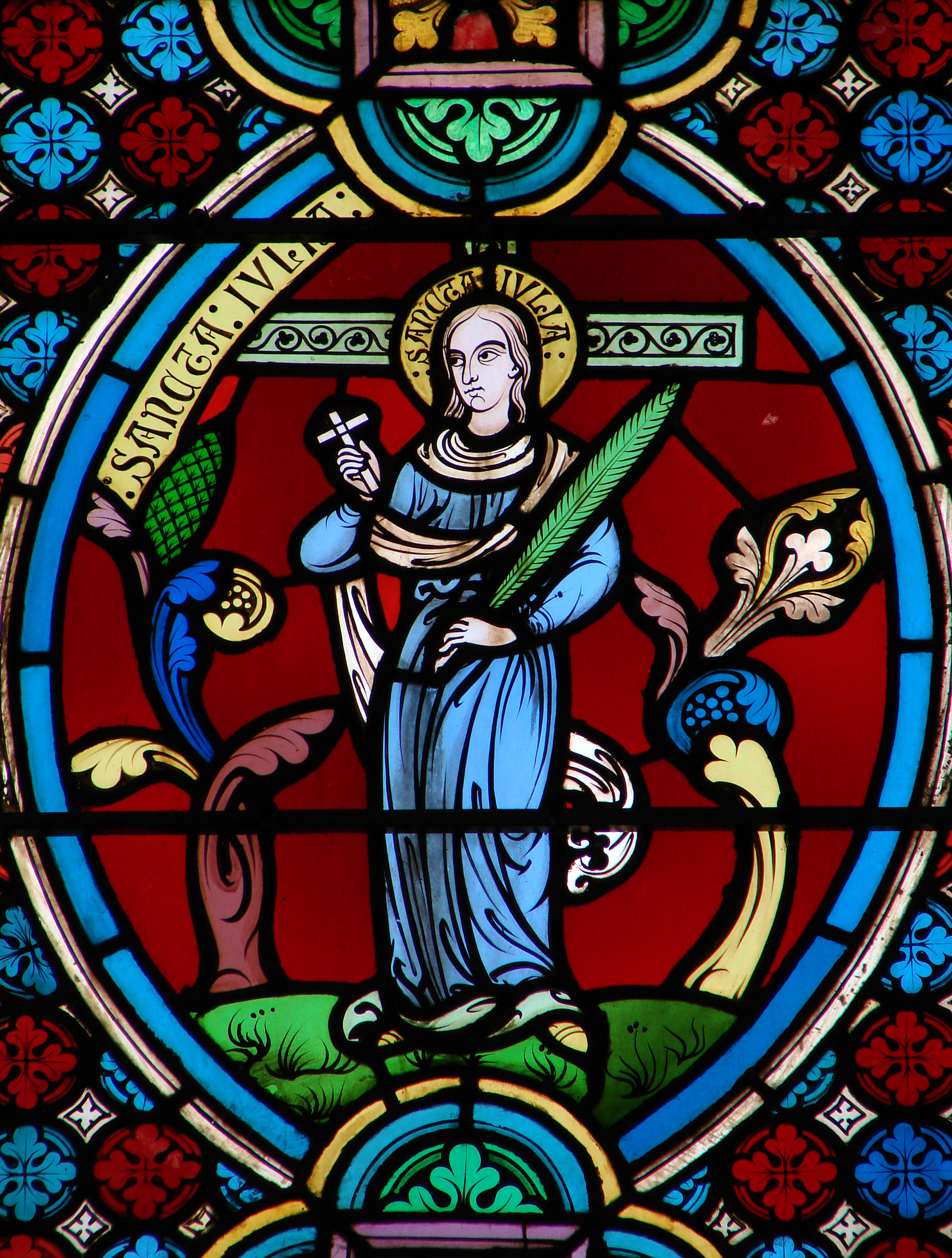
- Sancta Julia from a stained glass window in Meaux Cathedral. She holds the matryr's palm, a small cross and stands before a larger cross, the symbol of her crucifixion

Virgin martyr
- Born: 25 July; Carthage, Roman Africa
- Died: 5th century Corsica, Vandal Kingdom
- Venerated in: Roman Catholic Church, Eastern Orthodox Church
- Major shrine: Basilica di Santa Giulia
- Feast: 22 May (Catholic Church), 16 July (Eastern Orthodoxy)
- Attributes: Martyr's palm, crucifix
- Patronage: Corsica; Livorno; torture victims; pathologies of the hands and the feet

Julia of Corsica (Italian: Giulia di Corsica; French: Julie; Corsican: Ghjulia; Latin: Iulia), also known as Julia of Carthage, and more rarely Julia of Nonza, was a virgin and martyr who is venerated as a saint. Her death occurred most probably in AD 439 or thereafter. She and Devota are the patron saints of Corsica in the Catholic Church. Julia was declared a patroness of Corsica by the church on 5 August 1809; Devota, on 14 March 1820. Both were martyred in pre-Christian Corsica under Roman rule. Julia's feast day is 22 May in the Western liturgical calendar and 16 July in the East.

Julia is included in most summary lives of the saints. The details of those lives vary, but a few basic accounts emerge, portraying biographical data and events that are not reconcilable. Various theories accounting for the differences have been proposed. The quintessential icon of Saint Julia derives from the testimony of Victor Vitensis, contemporaneous Bishop of Africa. It is supported by physical evidence: the relics, a small collection of human bone fragments, are where historical events subsequent to the story say they ought to be, at the former Church of Santa Giulia in Brescia, Italy, now part of the city museum.

== Account by Victor Vitensis ==
=== The editions ===
The main written evidence of the events for which Julia became venerated as a saint is the account of Victor Vitensis, a bishop of Africa. He wrote one or more works that were or came to be called Historia persecutionis Africanae Provinciae, temporibus Geiserici et Hunirici regum Vandalorum, "History of the Persecution of the Province of Africa in the Time of Geiseric and Huniric, Kings of the Vandals." In 429 Geiseric and 80,000 tribesmen, all his people, crossed suddenly from Spain to Africa and in 439 took Carthage by surprise. Attempting to convert Christians to Arianism he committed such acts as the bishops of the church were able neither to forget nor to condone. In the next generation Victor Vitensis set about in a thorough, investigative manner to record them. As his account is contemporaneous and has been found accurate where it is possible to check he is considered a source of good historicity.

Many editions of his work came out but the one considered most authoritative and complete was compiled and edited by the Benedictine monastic, Thierry Ruinart. During his time he had access to manuscripts that do not exist now due to natural attrition by fire, theft or misplacement. Thus his editions of Vitensis containing a section of Part II, the appendix (the historical commentary containing additional material not included in previous editions): Passio Sanctae Juliae virginis & martyris, "the Suffering of Saint Julia, Virgin and Martyr", which he labels Ex cod. ms. Archimonasterii sancti Remigii Remensis, "From the codex manuscript of the chief monastery of Saint ron Remigius at Rheims", are taken by the mainstream to contain more of the work of Vitensis; certainly, in that story the narrator wears the persona of Vitensis. Unfortunately the story is only to be found in Ruinart; however, various traditions exist elsewhere: the day in the calendar of saints, the location of the martyrdom on Cap Corse, the history of the relics.

=== The story ===
Vitensis states that the story was acquired as the result of an inquiry "in those days" of the "elders" about the life of Julia and what she had done to become a martyr. Evidently at the time of the inquiry she was already popularly known as a martyr. The informants asserted that they had heard of her "from their parents".

Julia was a Carthaginian girl who, after being captured from her city, came into the service of a man named Eusebius. Vitensis does not say how she came into service, but the statement is usually interpreted that she was sold as a slave after Gaiseric captured Carthage in 439. It is known that he disposed of many recalcitrant Christians in this way, especially women. As a young and strong female, Julia would have brought a good price for the Vandals (who later turned to piracy, including slave-dealing.)

Vitensis says that she served "a fleshly master" but she followed Ephesians 6:6 and Colossians 3:22. Even though he was a pagan he admired so great a virtue in service. When her own duties were done and she was granted the servant's time off, she spent her spare time either in reading or insisting on praying. She grew pale and thin from fasting despite the threats and blandishments of her master, but her mind, intent on Heaven, fed daily on God's words.

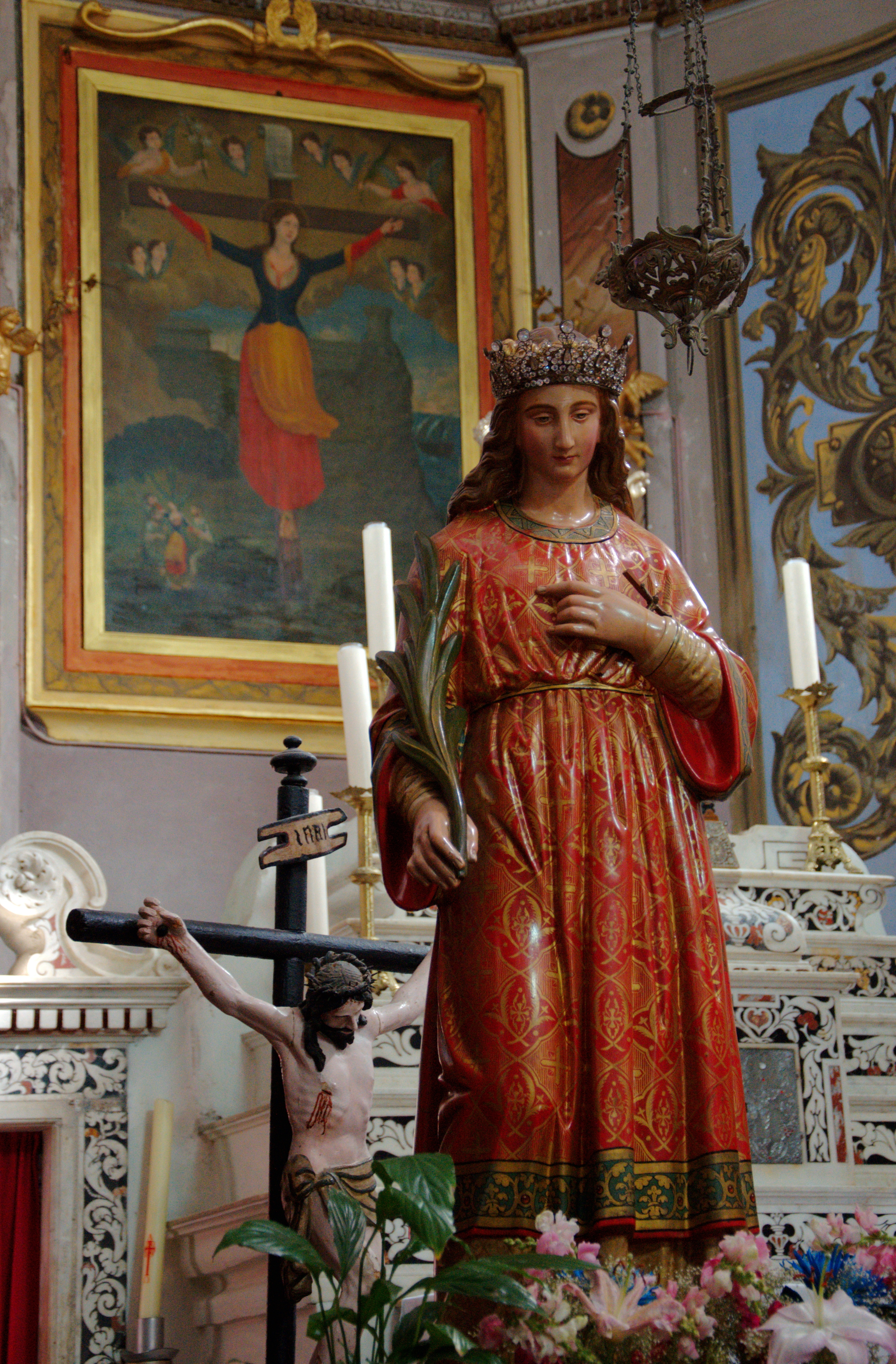
Statue and painting of in the church of Nonza, dedicated to Saint Julia

Eusebius, a citizen (civis) of Syria in Palestine, rowing hard for Gaul with an expensive cargo, anchored at Cap Corse for the night. From a distance he saw that sacrifices were about to be conducted by the pagans and immediately descended with all his people to attend. On that day they were slaying a bull "to their devils." The use of mercimonia for cargo identifies it as goods for sale, from which it is often inferred that Eusebius was a merchant. The bishop quips that he disagrees, that Eusebius left his precious cargo (Julia) in Corsica. The choice of a bull, Poseidon's animal, suggests that they had intruded on the yearly rites of the sacrum promontorium.

While they were celebrating by becoming intoxicated and Julia was sighing deeply for their error it was announced to Felix by his satellites that there was a girl in the ship who derided the worship of the gods. This "son of the serpent" asked Eusebius, "Why did not all who are with you come down to worship our gods? I heard that there is a girl who derides the names of our gods." Eusebius replied "I was not successful in moving the girl from the superstition of the Christians nor was I able to bring her to our religion by threatening. If she were not necessary because of her most faithful service I would already have had her tortured."

Then Felix Saxo gave him some options: "Either compel her to give offerings to our gods, or give her to me in exchange for whichever four of my handmaidens please you, or for the price that was set for her." Eusebius replied: "If you wanted to give me all your property it would not come to the value of her service."

Who Felix Saxo was either to offer such options or to allow Eusebius to refuse them is explained in another of Ruinart's footnotes. He offers variants and additional information from other manuscripts: he was a major, or "magistrate" among the sacrificers, a princeps or "chief man" quod forte praecipuus esset loci illius, "who happened to be in charge of the place", perhaps Cap Corse. Ferrarius in his "Catalog of the Saints of Italy" calls him Felix Tribunus, which is in fact a full explanation. He had the tribunician power, which would have made him a high-level magistrate, perhaps even provincial governor.

The "Saxo" part of the name appears out of context, as it is also the Latin for "Saxon." Ruinart suggests Sago for Sagona (or Sagone as it is still sometimes listed on the map), a vanished ancient town of western Corsica, the former port of Vico, Corse-du-Sud, in the Roman Catholic Diocese of Ajaccio. Apparently the Romans had given the tribunate to a native Corsican.

As to why he did not just take the girl by eminent domain, Vitensis gives the answer by calling Eusebius civis. The penalty for disrespecting the rights of Roman citizens was severe, and the girl was the property of Eusebius. He could do as he liked with her. However, disrespecting the state gods was a crime punishable by death, which the magistrate could only overlook at his own risk.

Having gotten counsel the "most poisonous serpent" prepared the banquet, where Eusebius became intoxicated and fell into a deep sleep. Straightway "a raging mob of gentiles" boarded the ship and placed Julia on the shore. Felix said: "Sacrifice to the gods, girl. I will give your master as much as he likes and dissolve the bond of your state." The tribunician power included manumission. However, Julia replied:

"Libertas mea Christi servitium est, cui ego quotidie pura mente deservio. Ceterum istum vestrum errorem non solum non veneror, verum etiam detestor."

"My liberty is the service of Christ, whom I serve every day with a pure mind. As for that error of yours, I not only do not venerate it, I detest it."

The tribune ordered that she be struck blows to the face. That done, she said that as Christ was struck for her, why should she not be struck for him? Then "the most cruel serpent" ordered that she be "tortured by the hair", later described as mollitia, "diminishment" of her hair. Then she was flogged, to which she replied in the same way, that if Christ was flogged and crowned with thorns for her, why should she not endure this diminishment of the hair, which she calls the vexillum fidei, the "flag of faith?" The "serpent", fearful of being indicted for cruelty, hurried the process along by ordering "the handmaiden of Christ" to be placed on the patibulum of a cross. Eusebius was awakened. As he let go the bonds of sleep, the saint, with mind released from the flesh, victress over suffering, took happy flight with the angels to the stars of heaven. Another manuscript cited by Ruinart has a columba, a "dove", flying from her mouth.

== Other views ==
She may have lived in the 6th or 7th centuries, or been killed by Moors rather than Roman authorities. Some scholars believe that Julia was indeed of Carthaginian origin, but that she died in Africa during the persecutions of Decius (c. 250 AD) or Diocletian, and that her association with Corsica derives from the fact that her relics were brought to this island during the invasion of Africa by the Vandals under Gaiseric, who was of Arian faith.

== Veneration ==
Monks from Gorgona Island rescued her relics. According to legend, attached to Julia's cross was a note, written in an angelic hand, that carried her name and story. The monks transported the relics to a sepulchre on their island after cleaning it and covering it with pleasant aromas.

In 762, Desiderius, king of the Lombards, at the request of his queen Ansa, translated her relics to the Benedictine abbey at Brescia. At Brescia, c. 763, Pope Paul I consecrated a church in Julia's name. It became a popular site for pilgrimage in the Middle Ages.

The Basilica of Santa Giulia near Bergamo is dedicated to her.

== See also ==
- Cap Corse
- Carthage
- Gorgona, Italy
- Vandals
