= Church of Saint-Étienne, Vignory =

Roman Catholic church in Grand Est, France

Coordinates: 48°16′39″N 5°06′18″E

Church of Saint-Étienne Église Saint-Étienne de Vignory
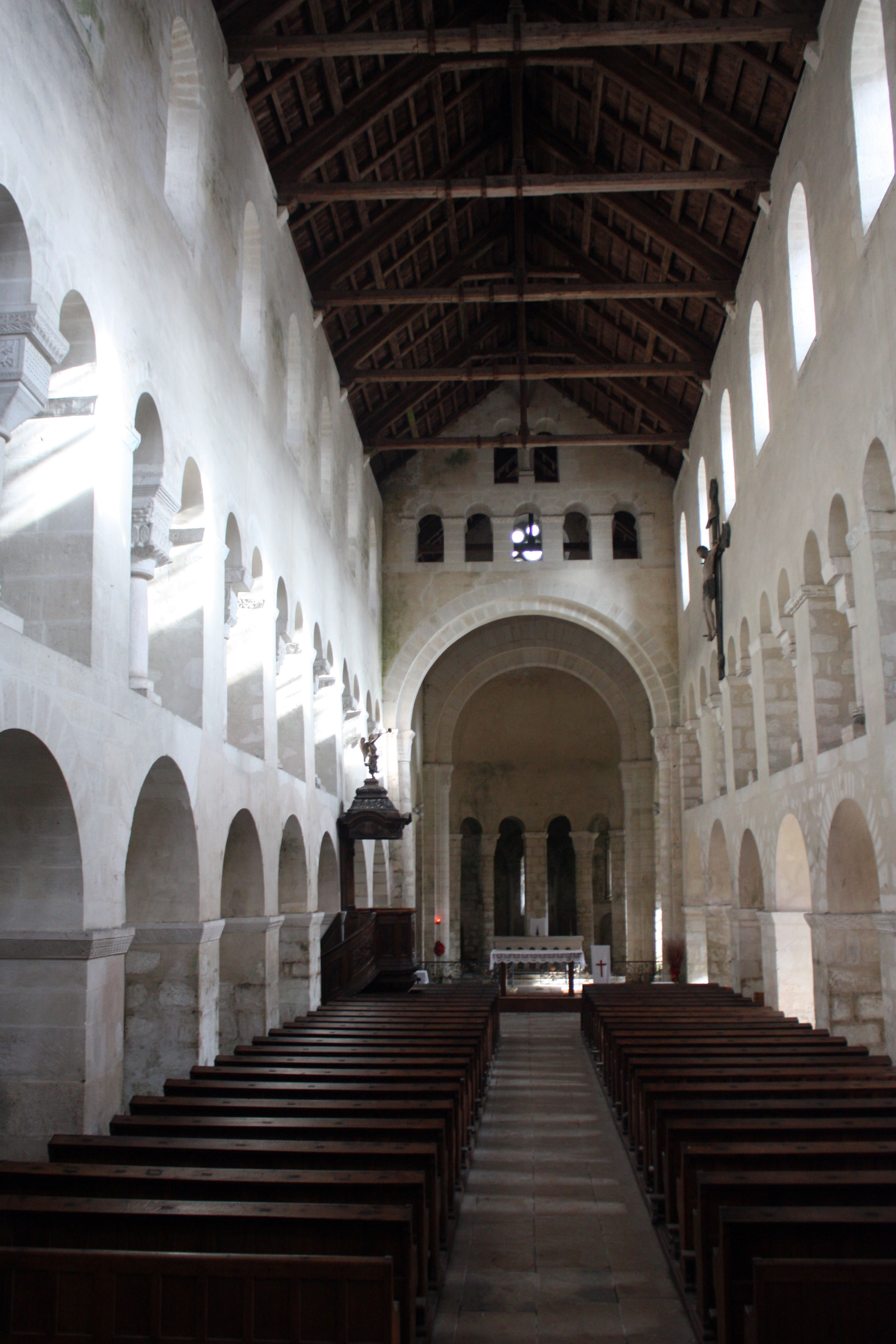
- Church of Saint-Étienne

Religion
- Affiliation: Roman Catholic Church
- Region: Haute-Marne
- Ecclesiastical or organisational status: Cathedral
- Status: Active

Location
- Location: Vignory, France
- Interactive map of Church of Saint-Étienne; Église Saint-Étienne de Vignory
- Territory: Abbey of Saint-Bénigne

Architecture
- Type: church
- Groundbreaking: 11th century
- Completed: 19th century

The Church of Saint Étienne (French: Église Saint-Étienne de Vignory) is a Roman Catholic church located in Vignory, Haute-Marne, Grand Est, France.

It was first constructed within the medieval town near the place where the "miracle of Saint Crepin" occurred. It was mentioned in the beginning of the 9th century in the archives of the Abbey of Luxeuil. Charlemagne funded it from the royal treasury. However, there is nothing left of the Carolingian church.

== History ==
In 1032, Gui, the first known Lord of Vignory, decided to create a college of canons and build a church for them. His son Roger replaced the canons with Benedictine monks and gave the newly built church to the Abbey of Saint-Bénigne of Dijon. He then built a new church with two bays in the choir and four bays in the nave. Building stopped until 1049. Monks were sent to live there in 1051 and 1057. The church was shared by the monks and parishioners.

The tower was added in the 12th century by parishioners. Later a chapel was added and the windows enlarged for more light. Five chapels were added along the aisle on the south side between the end of the 14th century and the 16th century. The nave was lengthened by two bays and given a new facade.

The Carolingian interior was retained and between 1843 and 1852 it was restored by architect Émile Boeswillwald.

== Architecture ==
The church follows the traditions of basilicas of the high Middle Ages but experiments with a three-level elevation with a clerestory. The column capitals exhibit simple sculpture which would later be elaborated.

It is one of the oldest examples of an ambulatory with three radiating chapels.

== Gallery ==
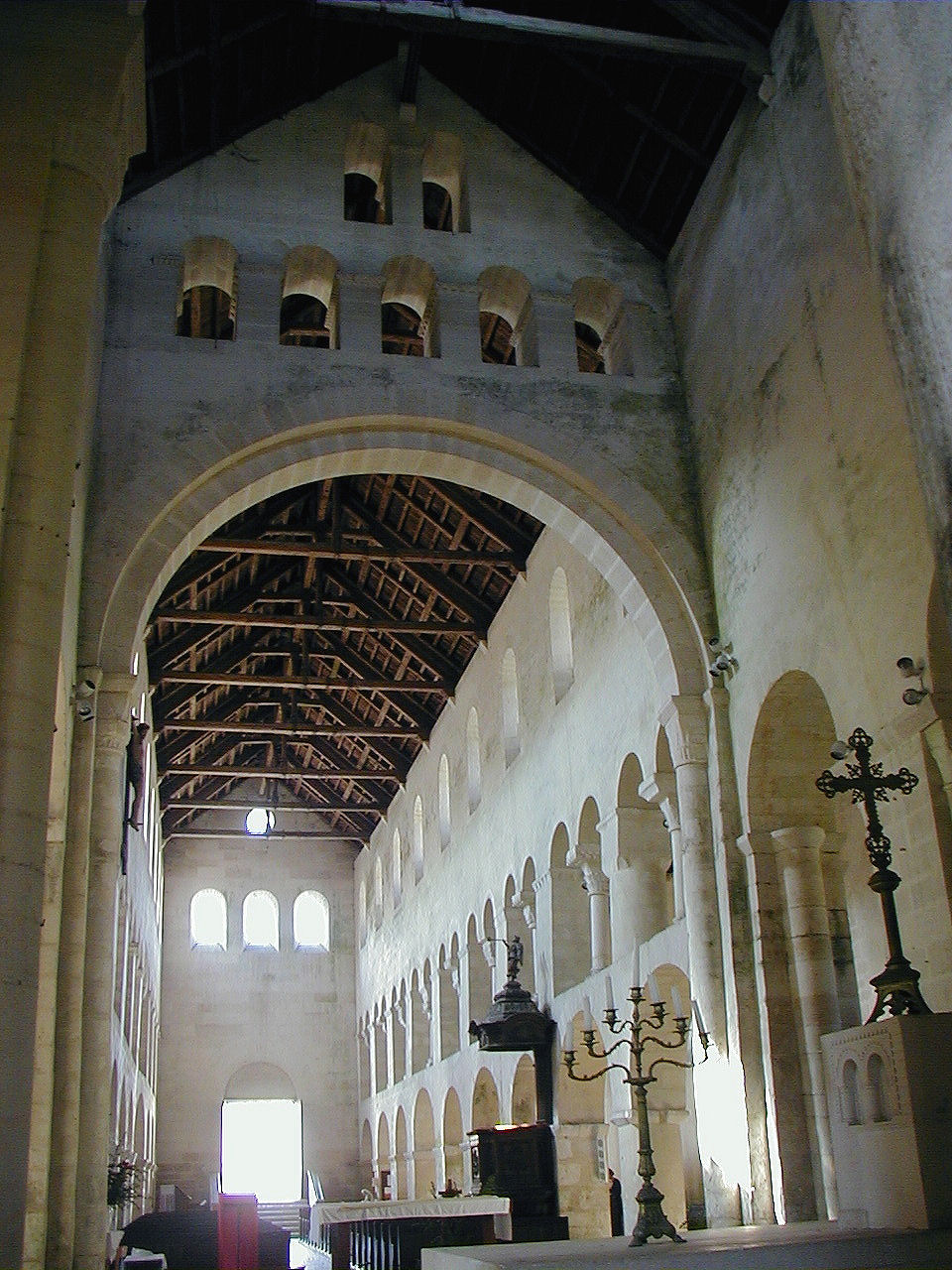
View from the choir.

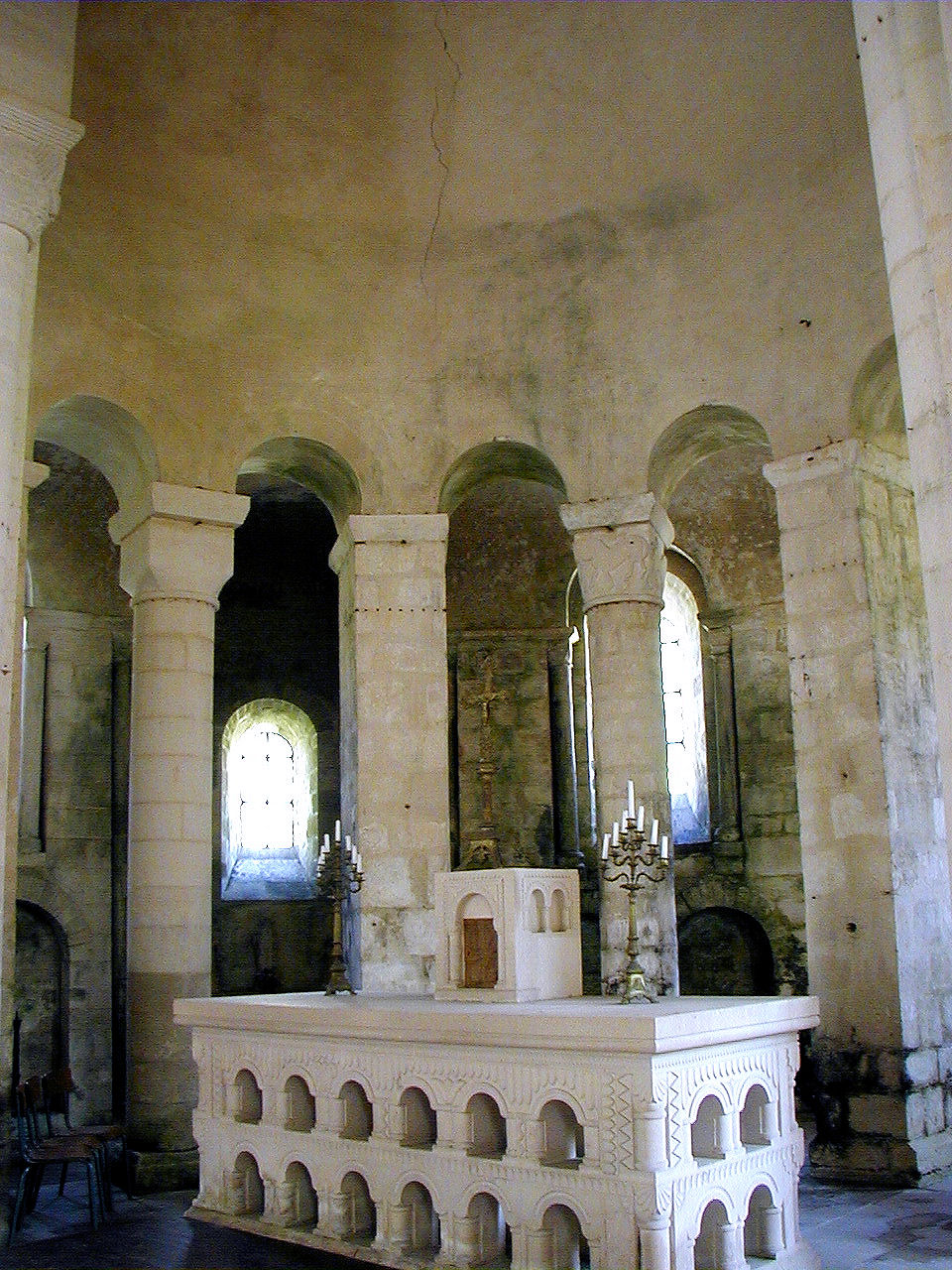
High altar, apse, and ambulatory

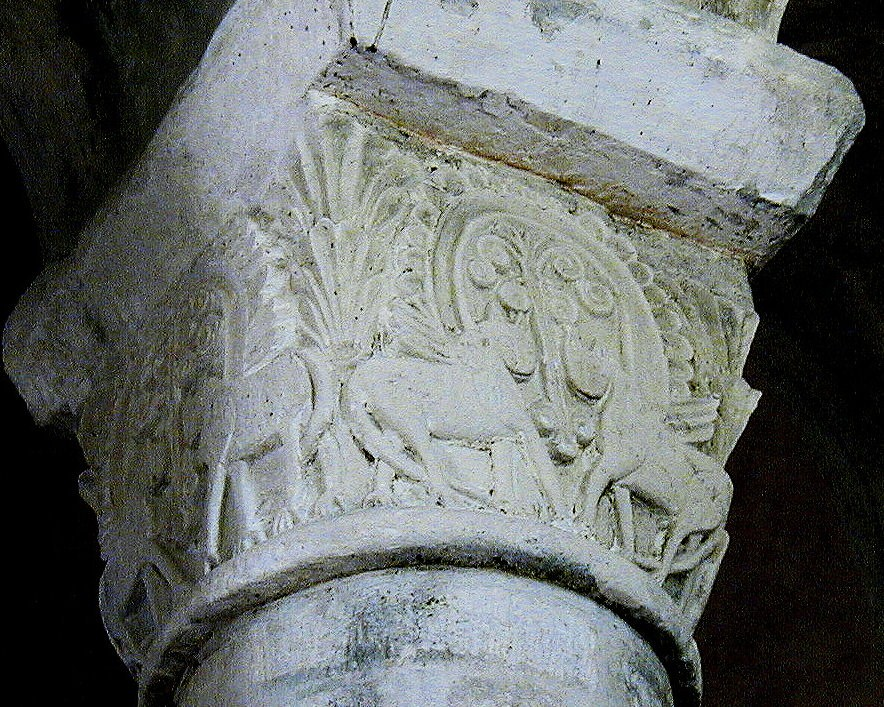
Capital in the ambulatory

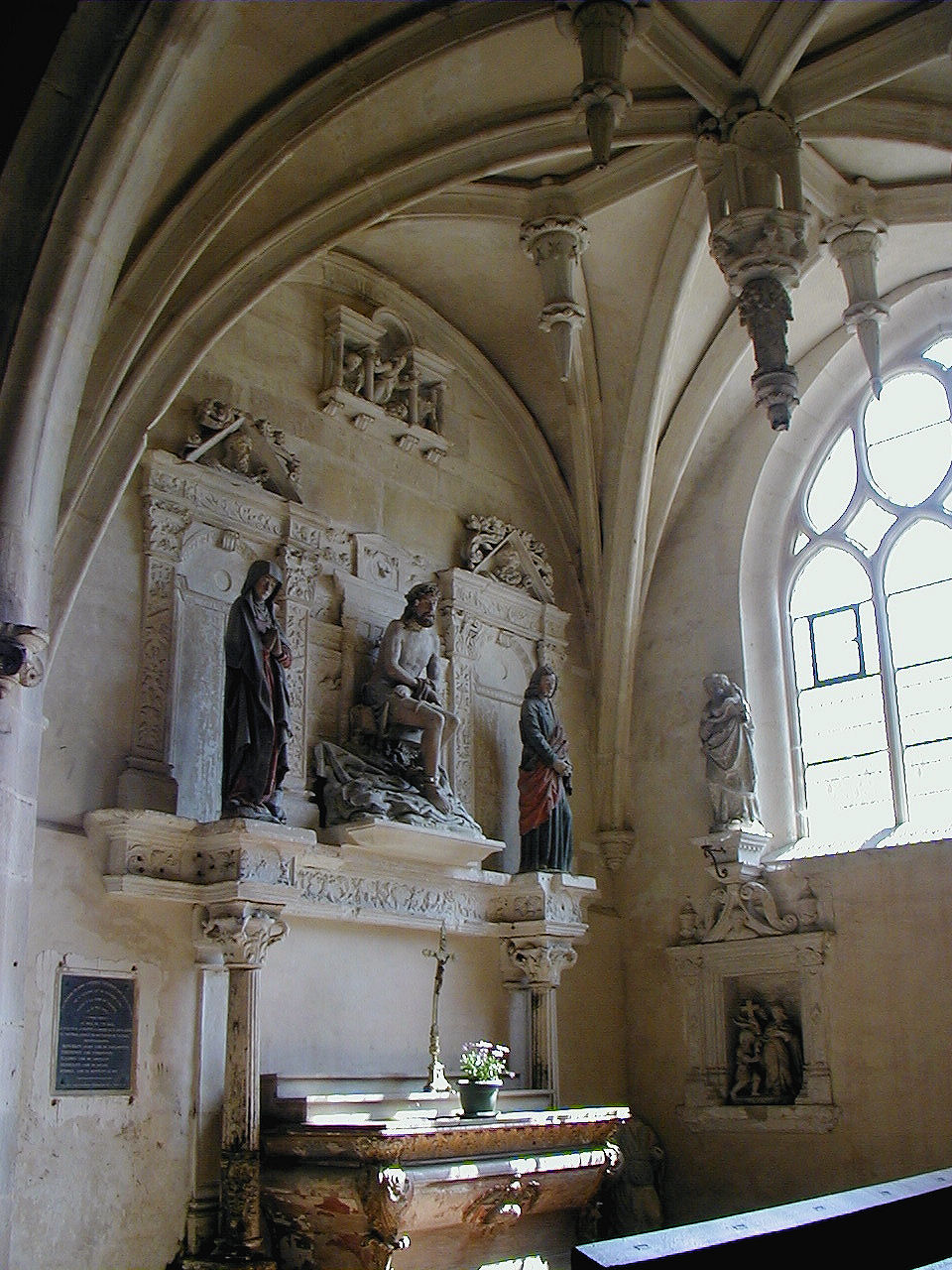
Chapel from 1541 overlooking the south aisle

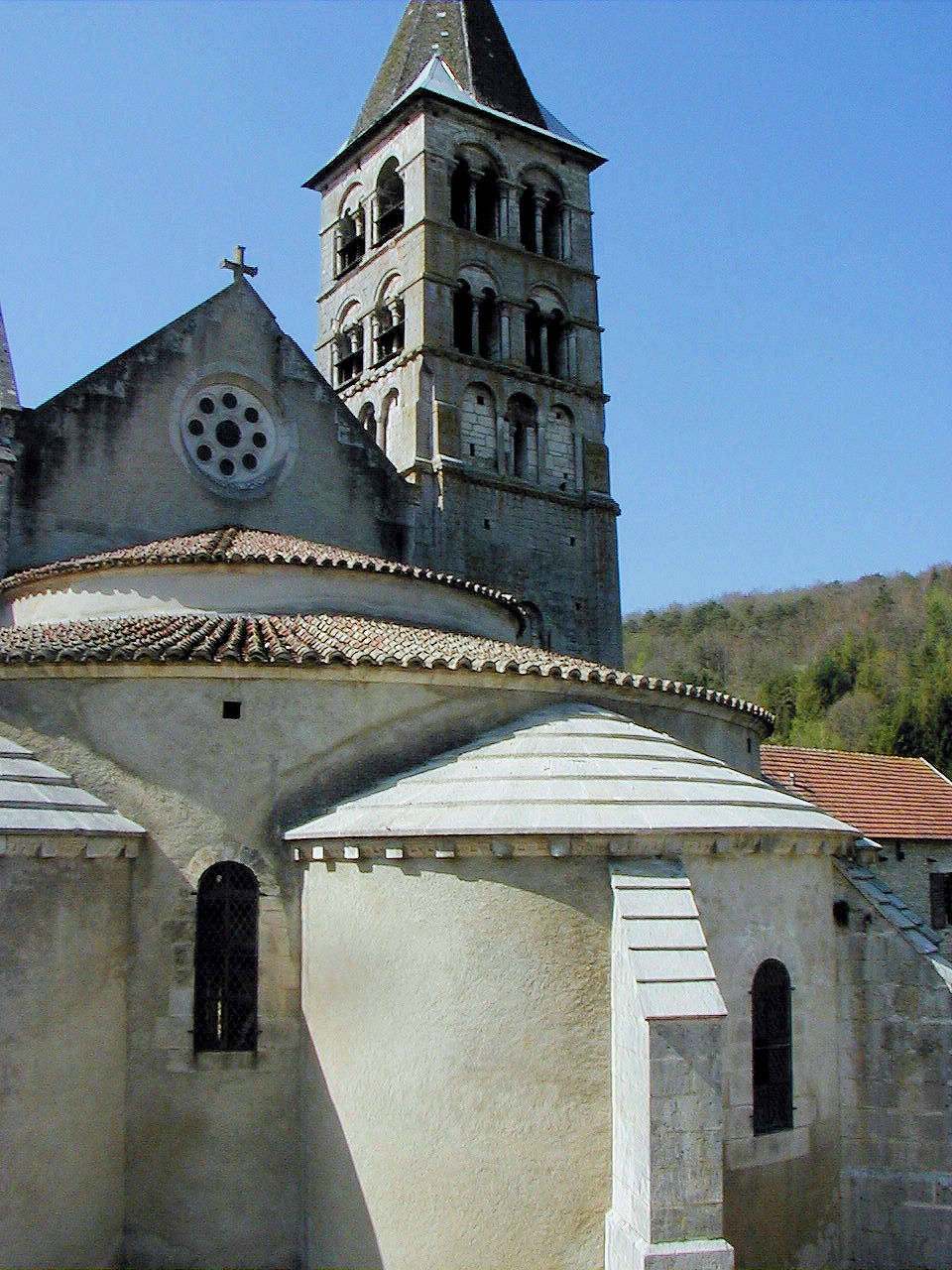
Radiating chapels.

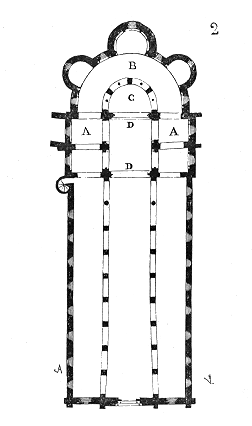
Plan

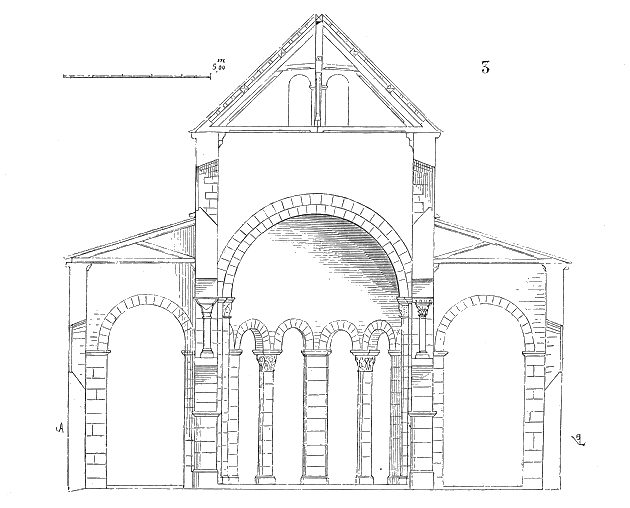
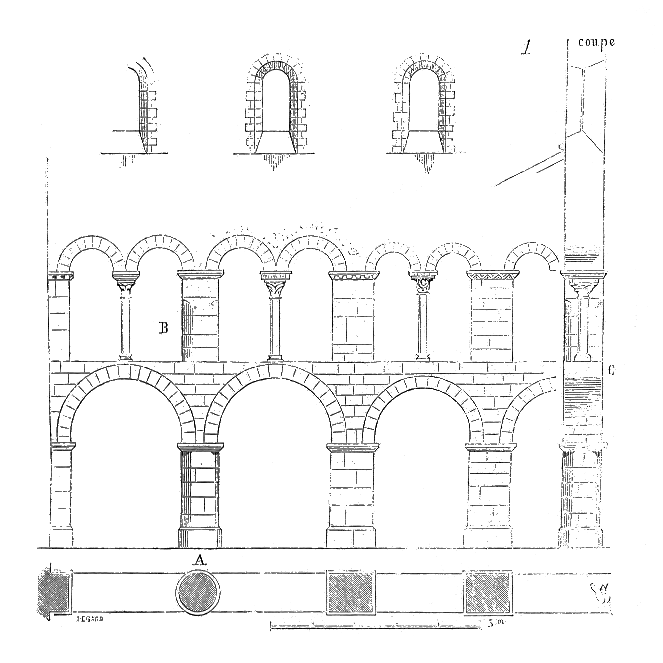
