= Bonate Sotto =

- Comune
- Comune di Bonate Sotto
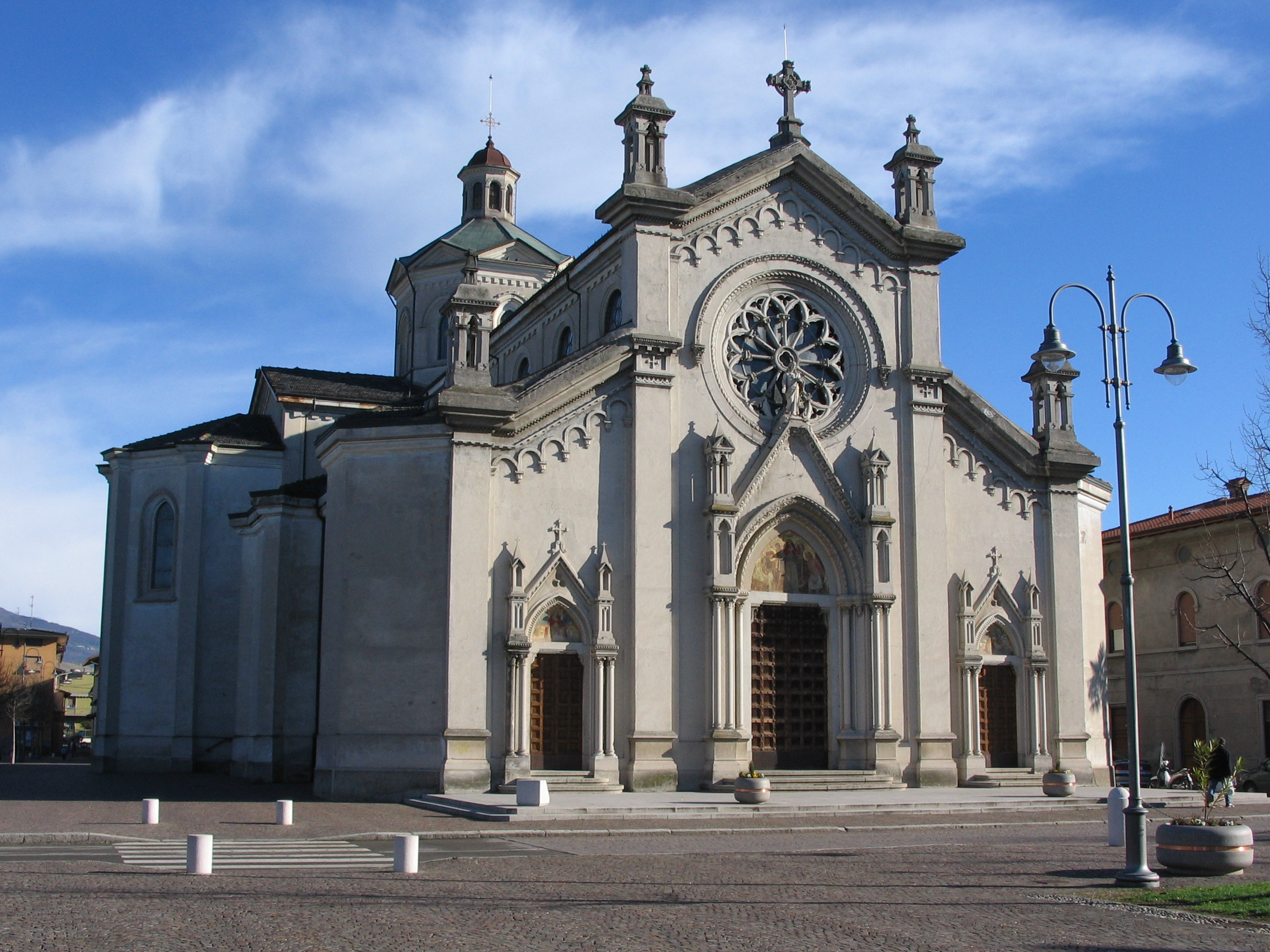
- Parish church of the Holy Heart of Jesus.

- Coat of arms

- Location within Italy Location within Lombardy
- Coordinates: 45°40′N 9°34′E
- Country: Italy
- Region: Lombardy
- Province: Bergamo (BG)

Government
  - Mayor: Carlo Previtali

Area
  - Total: 6.3 km^{2} (2.4 sq mi)
- Elevation: 215 m (705 ft)

Population (31 July 2017)
  - Total: 6,716
  - Density: 1,100/km^{2} (2,800/sq mi)
- Demonym: Bonatesi
- Time zone: UTC+1 (CET)
  - Summer (DST): UTC+2 (CEST)
- Postal code: 24040
- Dialing code: 035
- Patron saint: St. Sebastian
- Saint day: 20 January
- Website: Official website

Bonate Sotto (Bergamasque: Bunàt Sóta) is a comune (municipality) in the Province of Bergamo in the Italian region of Lombardy, located about 40 kilometres (25 mi) northeast of Milan and about 9 kilometres (6 mi) southwest of Bergamo in the Isola bergamasca.

Outside the town are the remains of the Romanesque Basilica di Santa Giulia.
