= Lombard band =

Decorative architectural element

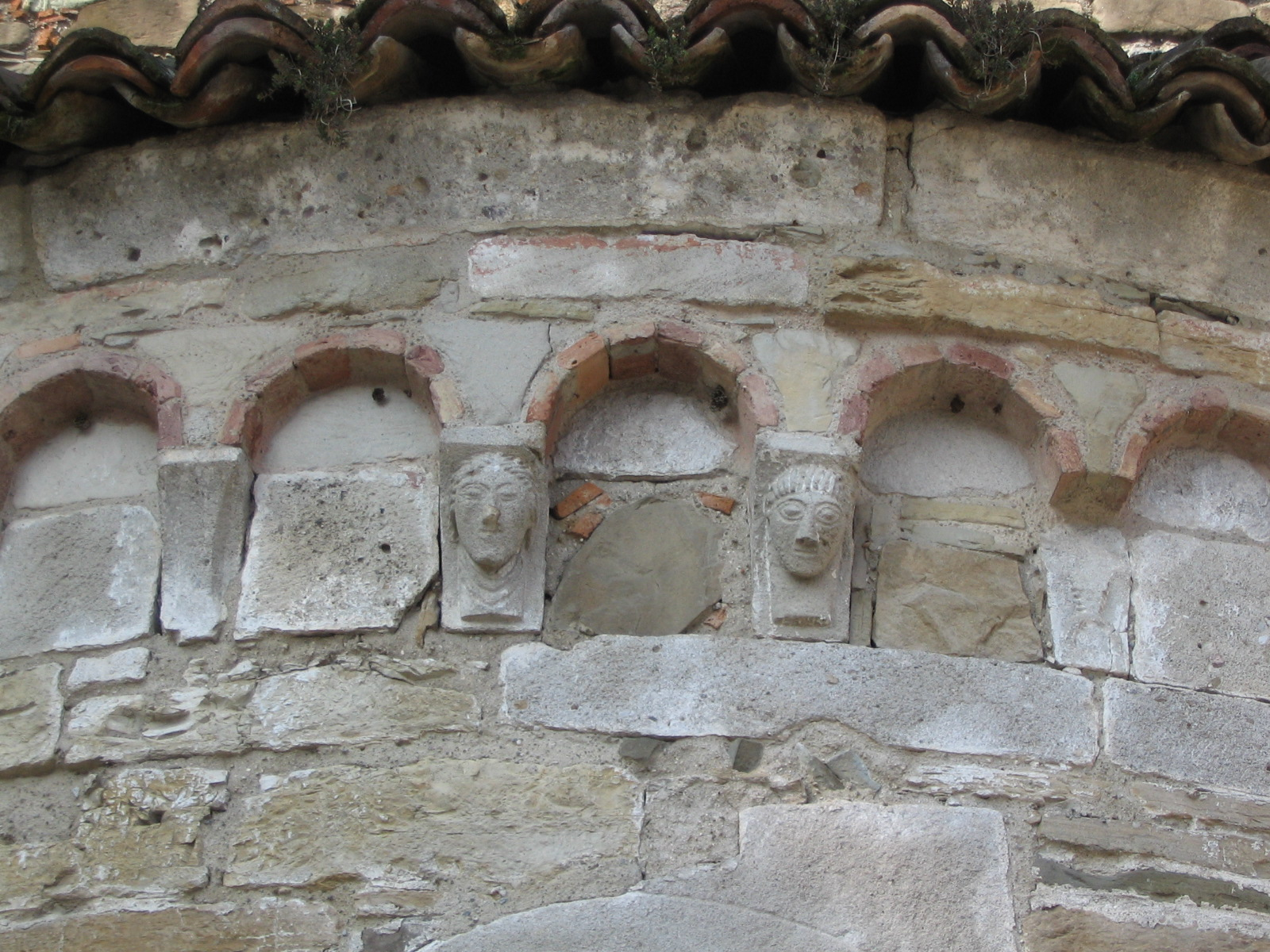
Lombard band in the Basilica di Santa Giulia, northern Italy

A Lombard band is a decorative blind arcade, usually located on the exterior of building. It was frequently used during the Romanesque and Gothic periods of Western architecture. It resembles a frieze of arches.

Lombard bands are believed to have been first used during the First Romanesque period, in the early 11th century. At that time, they were the most common architectural decorative motif for facades in regions such as Lombardy, Aragon and Catalonia. Arches of early Christian buildings of Ravenna, such as the Mausoleum of Galla Placidia, have been suggested as the origin of Lombard bands.

== See also ==
- Lombard architecture
- Lesene (low-relief pillars), another Lombardic element

Similar-looking structures:

- Corbels
- Jettying
