= Borrell (bishop of Vic) =

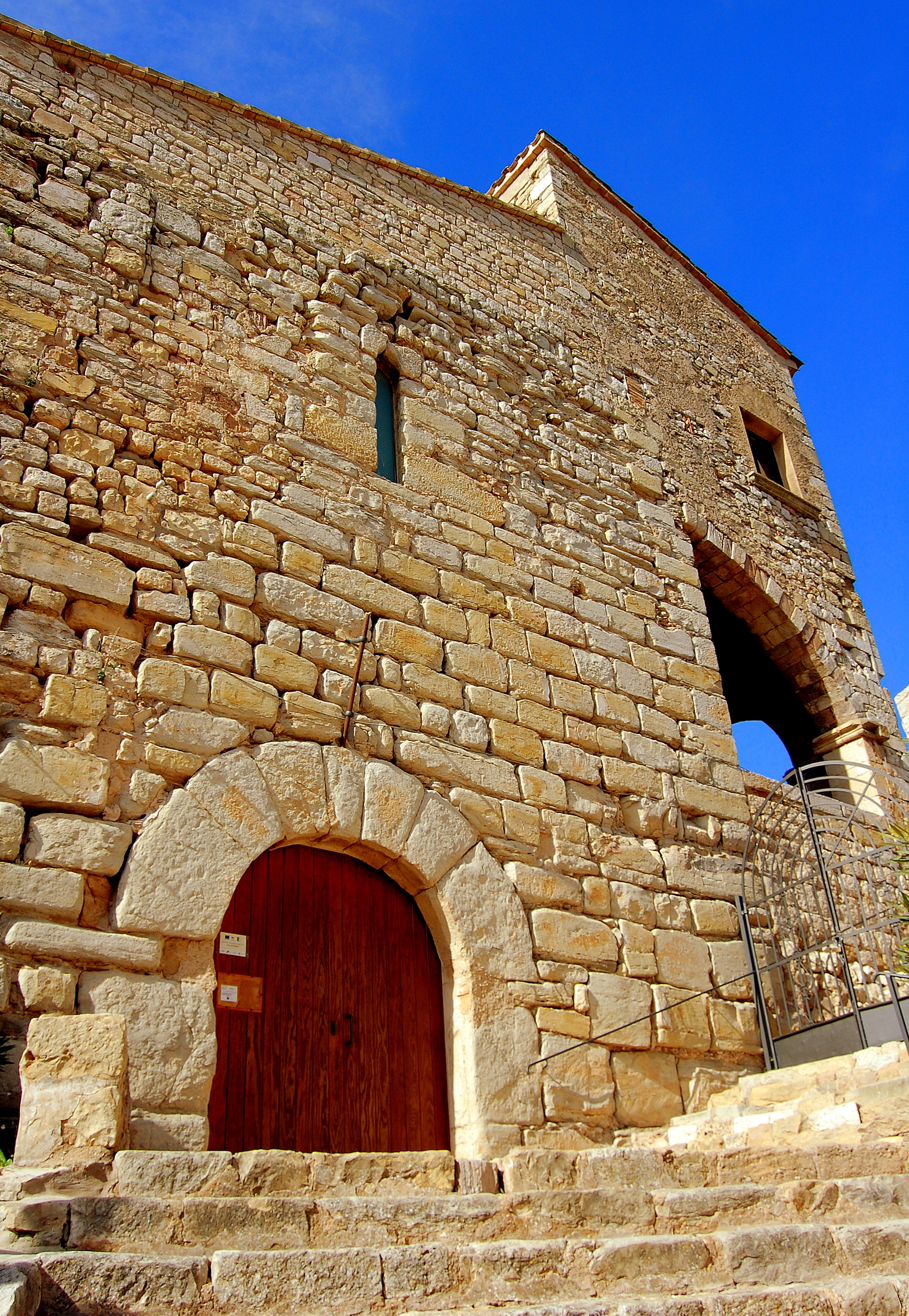
The castle of Barberà today. Borrell purchased this castle for the diocese.

Borrell (Latin: Burrellus; died 24 February 1018) was the bishop of Vic from 1010 until 1017. He was elected to replace Arnulf, who had died in battle against the Córdobans, and his episcopate coincided with the renewed colonisation of the west of Catalonia.

After succeeding to the episcopal throne in 1010, Borrell confirmed that the tithes from the fortified settlement (castrum) of Gurb belonged to the lord of the place, Berenguer, who had been granted them by Bishop Arnulf when he succeeded his father, Sendred. Berenguer was also a canon of the cathedral of Vic. In 1014 he was elected bishop of Elne. This resulted in a major dispute between Vic and Elne, as Borrell tried to collect the tithes of Gurb and seized Berenguer's family's property. Borrell created forged documents, assigned them to the episcopate of Froia, and presented them to an episcopal council in Narbonne in 1017. The council, fooled by the forgeries claiming that the tithes of Gurb belonged to the cathedral of Vic, confirmed the false documents and excommunicated Berenguer.

In 1011 and in 1017, Borrell sat on a panel of judges in lawsuits brought against the monastery of Sant Cugat. In 1015, Borrell installed Guillem de Mediona, already castellan of the frontier castle of Clariana, in the site of Calaf, with the condition that he build a fortress there. Guillem is described in documents as a levita, a term implying a deacon and a special relationship with the church. Calaf had originally been granted to the viscount of Ausona, Ramon (1007×9–14), by Count Raymond Borrell of Barcelona, but Borrell had acquired it for the see. Four months after the granting of Calaf to Guillem, Borrell farmed out the construction of a castle at Riquer, but no later documents mention a castle there. During Borrell's tenure, four castles were added to the diocese's holdings: Vilagelans was willed to the diocese; L'Espelt was donated to her; and Santa Perpètua and Barberà were bought.

Borrell died in 1018 while returning from a military expedition in al-Andalus. His successor, Oliba, convinced that the documents from the Gurb case were forged, reversed Borrell's decision on the tithes.
