= Sant Jaume de Malagarriga =

Romanesque church in Catalonia, Spain

- The whole church from the east, with the apse and the bell tower still roofed (photo L. Prat, Catalunya Romànica)
- Sant Jaume de Malagarriga
- 41.88998°N 1.71312°E
- Location: Malagarriga, Pinós, Solsonès, Catalonia
- Country: Spain

Architecture
- Style: Romanesque

Sant Jaume de Malagarriga is a Romanesque church in the enclave of Malagarriga, which belongs to the municipality of Pinós (Solsonès) and lies right on the boundary of the comarca of Bages. In the 12th century it was a cell of the monastery of Santa Maria de Serrateix, and at the end of the 15th century and the beginning of the 16th the place was recorded as the quadra of Sant Jaume. It was a parish until 1897, when it was suppressed and annexed to that of La Coromina.

== Location ==
The road from Manresa to Solsona crosses the enclave between kilometres 25 and 26. At kilometre point 25.5, coming from Solsona and after passing the Malagarriga bridge over the Cardener, a track leaves on the right and leads directly to the house and the church of Malagarriga.

== History ==
Copy of the will of Adelaida of 1050, which documents the place of Malagarriga, in the collection of Jaume Pasqual, vol. IV, f. 40v

According to the Catalunya Romànica, by its position the church must have belonged to the old territory of the castle of Torroella, although administratively it forms part of Pinós. The place of Malagarriga is documented in 1050.

In the act of consecration of the church of Serrateix, dated by its editor to 28 September 1123, the possessions confirmed to the abbey include, at Malagarriga, "totum ipsum honorem cum ecclesia Sancti Iacobi, que est cella ac dominicatura huius cenobii, cum decimis et primiciis vel defunccionibus et cimiteria ac oblacionibus suis" ("the whole of that honor with the church of Saint James, which is a cell and demesne of this monastery, with its tithes and first fruits or funeral dues, and cemeteries, and its offerings"). A will of 1291 made a bequest to Santa Cecília and to Sant Jaume de Malagarriga.

In 1486 a witness to an establiment (a land grant) of the monastery of Serrateix declared himself to be of "termini Mons de Malaguarriga, quadre Sancti Iacobi de Malaguarrigua" ("the territory of Mons de Malaguarriga, quadra of Saint James of Malaguarrigua"), and the fogatge (hearth census) of the Duchy of Cardona of 1502 records the "quadra de Sanct Jaume" ("quadra of Saint James") with a single hearth.

El Siglo Futuro of 25 January 1887, p. 3: the report on the novena at the Palà de Torroella mentions "el señor cura Párroco de Malagarriga" ("the Reverend Parish Priest of Malagarriga")

The Catalunya Romànica finds no parish functions at the church until after the 13th century, and states that it later lost them through the depopulation of the district. On 12 February 1639 the provision of Pere Danís as the new rector of the parish of Sant Jaume de Malagarriga, in the diocese of Solsona, was issued at Solsona, and the next day he took possession. The parish still had a rector in the 19th century: in December 1886 the "cura Párroco de Malagarriga" ("parish priest of Malagarriga") gave communion, together with the capitular vicar of Solsona, at a novena at the Palà de Torroella. In 1897 the parish was suppressed and annexed to that of Sant Ramon Nonat in La Coromina, erected that year, which received "l'extinta parròquia de Malagarriga i algunes cases del terme de Cardona" ("the extinct parish of Malagarriga and some houses of the district of Cardona"). According to the Catalunya Romànica, the church had become a chapel of the parish of La Coromina in Cardona, without worship and entirely abandoned.

== Architecture ==
The church from the south, August 1972 (inventory of the Diocese of Solsona, Sol. 252)

The apse, May 2019

It is a building with a single rectangular nave, ending at the east in a semicircular apse. The window of the apse, half walled up, appears to be double-splayed. At a much later date two side chapels were added, which give the plan the shape of a Latin cross, together with a sacristy to the north-east and a block to the north-west, from which rises a bell tower on a square plan.

The door, opened in the south wall, is round-arched and made of voussoirs; this wall and the apse have openings made later. The walls are of well-cut, polished ashlar blocks, typical of 12th-century work.

== Cemetery ==
The church, the bell tower and the cemetery wall on 28 March 1998 (Arxiu Comarcal de l'Anoia, fons Cementiris de Catalunya)

The 1123 act of consecration already includes the "cimiteria" ("cemeteries") among the rights of the church. The cemetery of Malagarriga, in the municipality of Pinós, appears in the Cementiris de Catalunya collection of the Arxiu Comarcal de l'Anoia, in a record dated 28 March 1998.

== Bibliography ==
- Bolòs, Jordi (2006). Diplomatari del monestir de Santa Maria de Serrateix (segles X-XV) [Diplomatary of the monastery of Santa Maria de Serrateix (10th–15th centuries)] (PDF). Diplomataris, no. 42 (in Catalan). Barcelona: Fundació Noguera; Pagès Editors. ISBN 84-9779-465-6.
