= Siege of Cardona (1711) =

Siege of the War of the Spanish Succession in Catalonia

- Part of the War of the Spanish Succession
- Map of the siege of Cardona, 1711 (Tindal and Rapin, 1744)
Date	12 November – 23 December 1711
Location	Cardona, Principality of Catalonia
Result	Habsburg–Catalan victory; siege lifted

Belligerents
Bourbon France and Spain	Habsburg and Catalan forces

Commanders and leaders
Muret; Arpajou; Melun †; Hercel; Vendôme (overall)	Eck; Guido Starhemberg (relief); Stanhope (relief)

Strength
About 8,000 elite troops and 22 engineers on arrival	Garrison of 2,183 men Relief force of about 4,300

Casualties and losses
Over 700 in the small camp alone; Muret's total estimated at 2,500, probably too high. Left behind 14 siege guns, 4 mortars and 4 small cannon.	About 300 in the relief force, including Colonel Stanhope; "some hundred" on 17 November

The siege of Cardona took place from November to December 1711 during the War of the Spanish Succession. A Franco-Spanish corps under Muret besieged the Castle of Cardona in the Principality of Catalonia, while the main armies of Vendôme and Guido Starhemberg faced each other at Els Prats de Rei. The Bourbon troops took the town on 17 November but not the castle, and withdrew after Starhemberg's relief force reached the garrison on 21–22 December.

== Background ==
In September 1711 the two armies reached Els Prats de Rei, on the route the Bourbon army wanted to take towards Barcelona. Vendôme gave up an attack on Starhemberg's position and decided to take Cardona and Solsona as a closing success for the campaign. In mid-October he had a road built from Calaf to Cardona by way of Pinós, which a merchant's report of 28 October said was finished in twelve days.

Starhemberg had the garrison strengthened. On 20 September the Cardona commander Planta had reported 800 men in the castle against the 1,200–1,500 needed; reinforcements and supplies arrived on 5 October, and Colonel Barry came in with 300 men on 23 October. Eck was appointed commander on 3 November. The garrison then numbered 2,183 men: 310 detachments, 700 Grisons, 729 of the Taaffe regiment, 252 of the Diputación (the Catalan regiment of the Generalitat), 192 grenadiers, and dismounted dragoons.

== The Bourbon advance ==
Two Bourbon columns were detached: Muret against Cardona and Bracamonte against Solsona. Solsona was invested on 3 November and its garrison withdrew to Cardona on the night of 6–7 November. Muret and Arpajou arrived before Cardona on 12 November with about 8,000 elite troops and 22 engineers. Serra gives 8,000 infantry and 1,500 cavalry, camped at the Pla de Bergús on 11–12 November.

The defenders held an entrenched camp covering the approach from Calaf, with a front of about 300 metres strengthened by two old towers, and a fortified outpost to the south.

== The siege ==
Contemporary Austrian plan of Cardona, its castle and surroundings, 1711

The trench was opened on the night of 14–15 November and the batteries fired on 15 November. On 17 November about 1,400 men in three columns, under Hercel, Arpajou and Melun, took the advanced works and the town. Eck sallied out with 300 men but was driven back into the castle, and the commander of the southern outpost surrendered with seven officers and 112 men. The French admitted about 43 casualties; the losses on the allied side were put at "some hundred". Muret held the town, but not the castle, which was then bombarded with cannon for 34 days.

Batteries opened fire on the castle on 20 November, and a breach at the Isabella bastion on 21 November was repaired during the night. On 22 November Starhemberg ordered Gehlen to bring 150 grenadiers into the castle with powder and musket balls; guided by Jaume Solà, a young builder from Riner, they got in on the night of 23 November with one man wounded. According to Albertí, Antoni Desvalls, brother of the governor Manuel Desvalls and a leader of the Catalan militias, was among them. Gehlen reported that only about 50 men in the castle were sick, and 34 aggregated officers left with him. Muret built a second bridge and four battalions crossed on 25 November.

Starhemberg's war council on 29 November decided to hold the camp at Els Prats de Rei rather than abandon it to relieve Cardona. Muret fired a mine and attempted an assault, which was repulsed. On 6 December he summoned the castle and Planta went to the French camp, but the talks broke down. On 11 December a mine brought down some masonry and grenadiers reached the covered way, but Eck threw them out.

== Relief ==
The Cardener crossing at Malagarriga, where the relief force camped, on an Austrian plan of the 1711 siege, detail. Kriegsarchiv, Vienna, H III d 812.

The relief force crossed the Cardener at the Malagarriga bridge, south of the town. Battée and Lacheraine were ordered to cross the river there with 1,500 infantry, 500 dismounted dragoons, 700 horse and 100 miquelets (Catalan irregulars), make contact with the garrison by way of Colomina and bring in a supply convoy, while Nebot supported them from Súria. Battée camped at the bridge on 10 December and crossed it during the night. The attack on Colomina, which 300 French troops held, failed; when French troops advanced towards Malagarriga, Battée was in danger of being cut off from the bridge, and he fought his way back across it to his camp. According to an 1837 report quoted by the historian Albert Fàbrega, the bridge's parapets were destroyed in 1711.

A second force was then assembled at the Malagarriga camp under Battée, joined by Hamilton and Gehlen: about 4,300 men, of whom 2,900 were infantry, 400 dismounted dragoons, 700 horse, and 600–700 miquelets. Stanhope joined on 17 December. By 16 December Antoni Desvalls, marquis of Poal, commander of the sometents (the local militia), was near the Malagarriga bridge with 1,500 of them, and General Rafael Nebot had arrived there with three regiments of fusiliers, Catalan and Aragonese volunteers and 500 peasants carrying provisions. Under the plan drawn up by the quartermaster-general Peroni, the troops in the Malagarriga camp were to march out on the evening of 20 December, and 160 regulars and 200 miquelets were to advance from the bridge against a French redoubt. The attack went in on 21 December. Eck sallied out from the castle; Colonel Pedro Montaner of the Diputación fell, and Muret's counter-attack failed. Colonel Stanhope was killed, and the French and Spanish lost about 400 men and the colours of the Couronne regiment.

On 22 December Eck reported a shortage of water, but the convoy entered the castle. The French abandoned their posts and the town, leaving 14 siege guns, 4 mortars and 4 small cannon. The fusiliers and peasants led by Desvalls carried the provisions into the castle on their backs. Serra dates the decisive action to 20–22 December, with communication with the castle open for five hours on 20 December while 400 men entered.

== Aftermath ==
French losses were over 700 at the small camp, and General Melun was killed; Muret's total of 2,500 is probably too high. The relief force lost about 300 men and Colonel Stanhope. Starhemberg held a Te Deum on 23 December, and the Empress and Emperor Charles VI thanked him; Eck died before the Emperor's letter arrived. At 11 pm on the night of 22–23 December Muret sent a trumpeter to Eck asking for safeguards for his wounded, and he rejoined Vendôme on 24 December. Mühlwerth records that the relief had a moral effect on the French army, and Vendôme withdrew towards Agramunt.

The Gran Enciclopèdia Catalana states that the Bourbon advance on Barcelona was momentarily halted. It also notes that in 1713, after the fall of Castellciutat, only Barcelona and Cardona remained free, and that Cardona capitulated on 18 September 1714.

== See also ==
- Siege of Barcelona (1713–1714)

== Bibliography ==
- Mühlwerth, Friedrich (1887). Feldzüge des Prinzen Eugen von Savoyen, II. Serie, IV. Band: Spanischer Successions-Krieg, Feldzug 1711 (in German). Vienna: Verlag des k.k. Generalstabes.
- Serra i Sellarés, Francesc (2012). "El setge de Cardona de l'any 1711". Butlletí de la Societat Catalana d'Estudis Històrics (in Catalan). 23: 243–287. doi:10.2436/20.1001.01.94.
