= Hostal de Pinós =

- Native name: Hostal del Santuari de Pinós
- Industry: Restaurant
- Founded: 1524; 502 years ago
- Headquarters: Pl. del Santuari S/N, 25287 Pinós, Lleida, Spain
- Website: www.restaurantdepinos.com

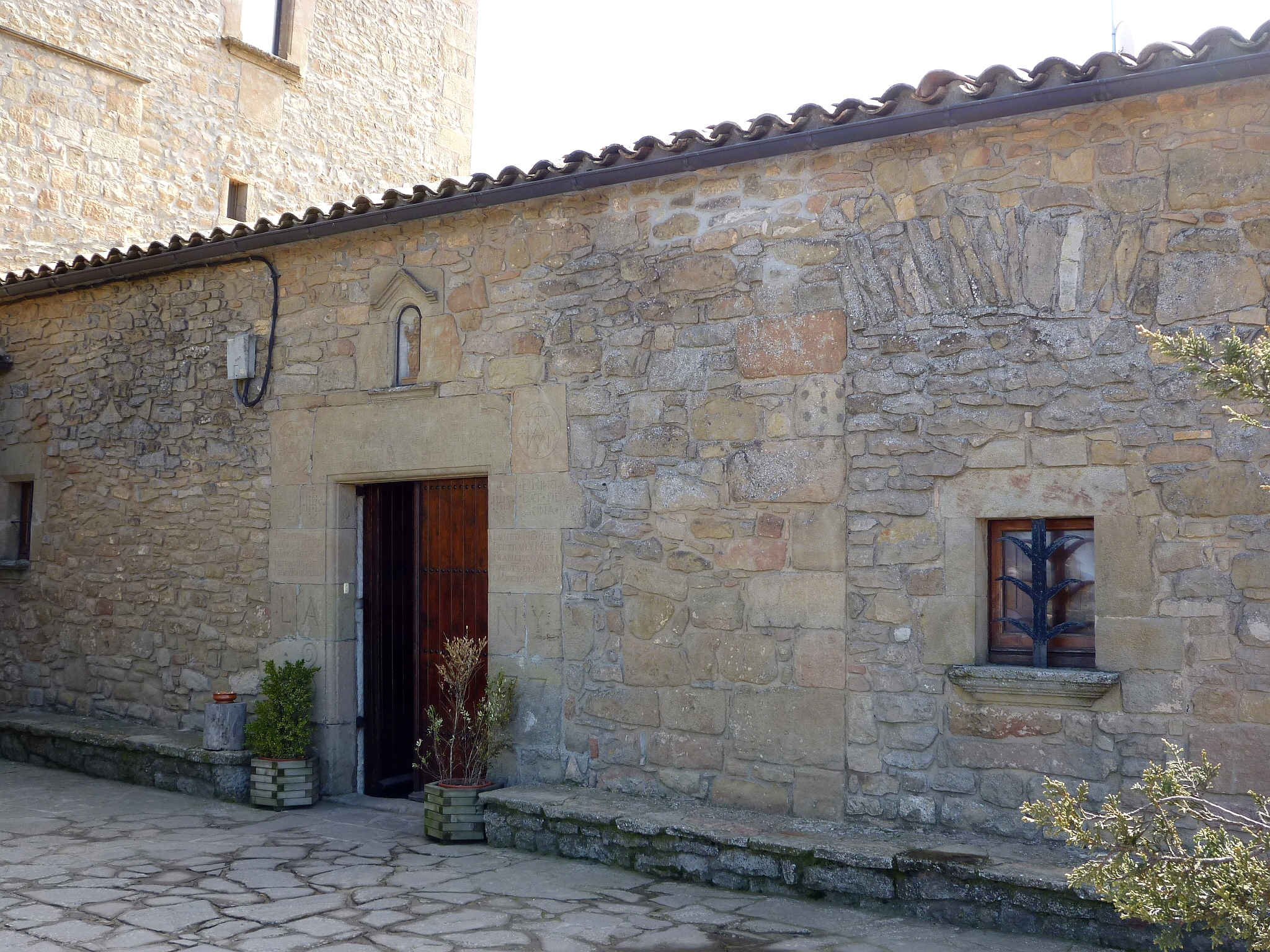
Hostal de Pinós

Hostal de Pinós is one of the oldest hostals in Spain. It was founded in 1524 and is located in Pinós, Lleida, Spain. The inn has never closed its doors from the start and offers three dining rooms: a central with capacity for 60 people and two small with a capacity 23 people.

== See also ==
- List of oldest companies
