= Froia (bishop of Vic) =

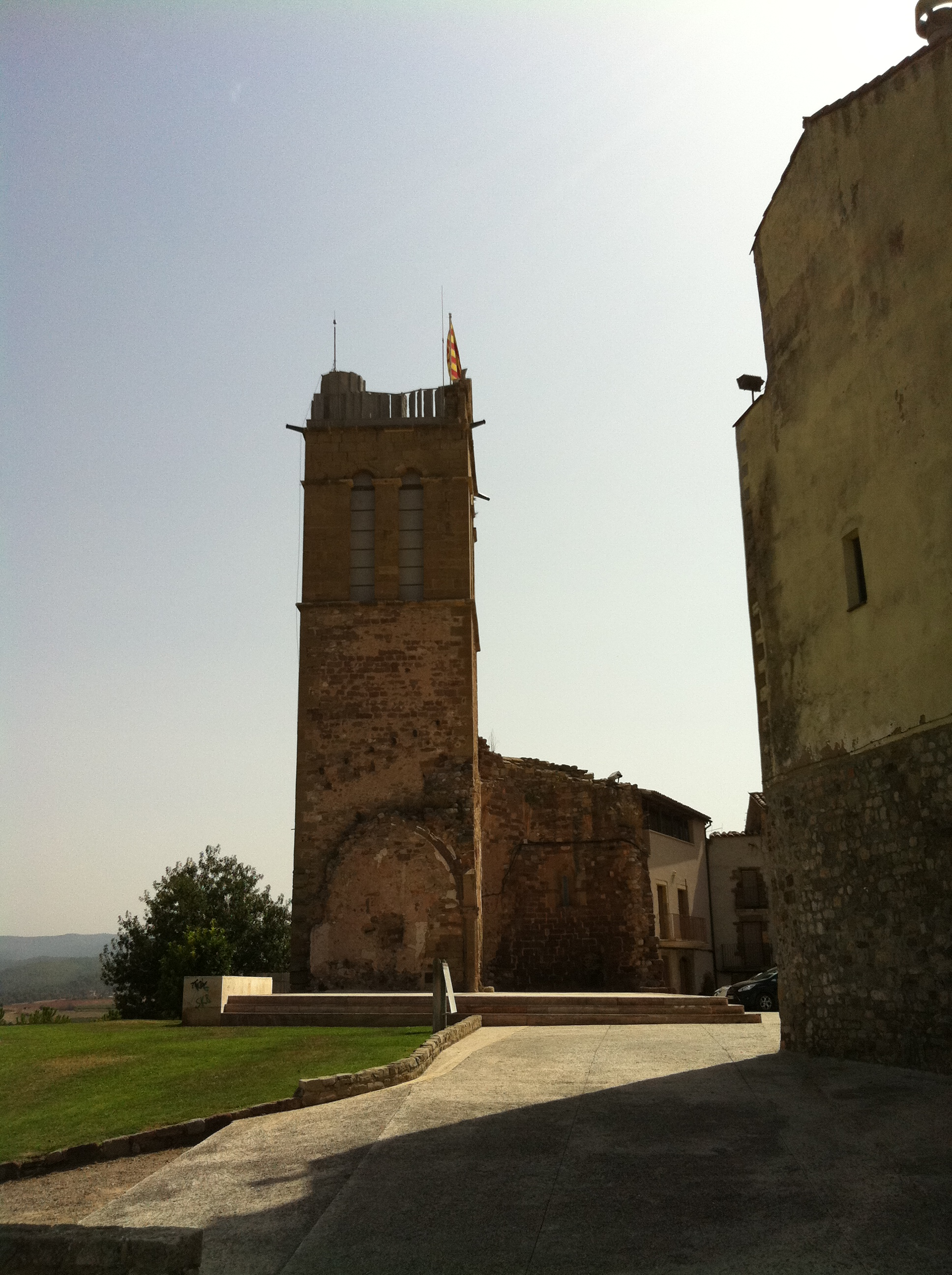
The tower of the castle of Artés dates from the 10th century and was owned by the bishops of Vic during Froia's time

Froia (or Fruia, Catalan: Frujà or Fruià; died 992×93) was a canon of the cathedral of Vic from 957 and bishop from 972. His predecessor, Atto, tried to have Vic raised to archiepiscopal status, but was assassinated by his opponents. Elected to replace him, Froia was consecrated by Ermengol, archbishop of Narbonne, who had opposed Atto because Vic was a suffragan diocese of Narbonne.

On 25 February 978, Pope Benedict VII confirmed the possessions and borders of the see of Vic in a pair of bulls sent to Froia and the other suffragan bishops of Narbonne.

Froia pursued a policy of acquiring and building castles along the Catalan frontier, even within the county and diocese of Barcelona. In 987, Count Borrell II of Barcelona donated half of the frontier castle of Miralles to Froia, who extracted an oath of fidelity from the castellan or vicar, Ennec Bonfill: the earliest surviving written oath from Catalonia. Froia also acquired the castles of Les Espases, Esparreguera and Font-rubí in the diocese of Barcelona. He also attempted to construct castles at Montbui and Tous.

Froia was assassinated in 992 or 993 by a faction supporting an anti-bishop. He was succeeded by Arnulf.
