= Sant Feliu de Vallcarca =

Coordinates: 41°42′08″N 2°3′33″E

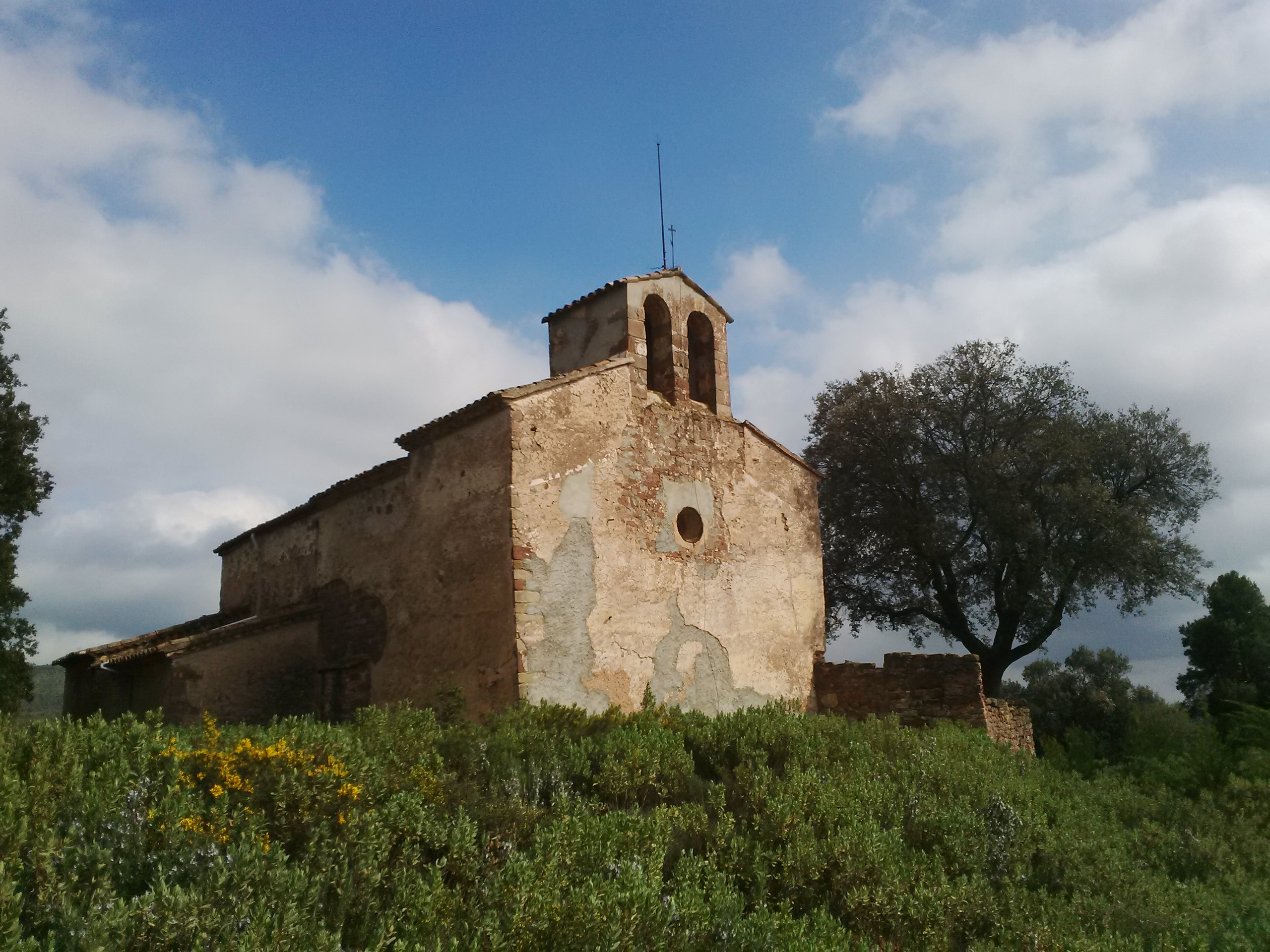
Sant Feliu de Vallcarca, April 2015

Sant Feliu de Vallcarca (also called Sant Feliuet of Vallcàrquera or Vallcàrcara) is a Romanesque church located about fifty kilometers from Barcelona in the area around the village of Sant Llorenç Savall (Catalonia, Spain).

The church was built in 1053 and has elements of the Lombard Romanesque style. A statue of Our Lady of Help venerated in the church disappeared in 1936 during the Spanish Civil War and was recovered in 1954. The church was considerably damaged during the war, but was later restored and reopened for worship. The floor plan of the temple consists of a single nave and main apse, with four smaller apses added later, two on each side of the nave.

Two masses are held at the church every year, one on Pentecost Monday and the other on the third Sunday in September.
