= Josep Maria Guix Ferreres =

- Bishop of Vic
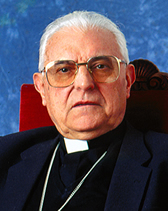
- Native name: Josep Maria Guix i Ferreres
- Church: Catholic Church
- Diocese: Diocese of Vic
- In office: 20 June 1983 – 13 June 2003
- Predecessor: Ramon Masnou i Boixeda
- Successor: Romà Casanova i Casanova
- Previous posts: Titular Bishop of Sistroniana (1968-1983); Auxiliary Bishop of Barcelona (1968-1983)

Orders
- Ordination: 31 May 1952
- Consecration: 14 December 1968 by Luigi Dadaglio

Personal details
- Born: 19 December 1927 La Coromina, Catalonia, Kingdom of Spain
- Died: 28 June 2009 (aged 81)

Josep Maria Guix Ferreres (19 December 1927 – 28 June 2009) was a Catalan bishop of the Roman Catholic Diocese of Vic.

Guix Ferreres was ordained on 31 May 1952 to the priesthood for the Roman Catholic Archdiocese of Barcelona. Pope Paul VI appointed him auxiliary bishop of the Barcelona Archdiocese on 22 October 1968, and he was ordained bishop on 19 December 1968. On 20 June 1983, Pope John Paul II appointed him Bishop on the Diocese of Vic. He retired on 13 June 2003.
