= Malagarriga Bridge =

Bridge crossing in Catalonia, Spain

- The old bridge in 1925
- Crossed: Cardener
- Locale: Over the Cardener, between Pinós (Solsonès) and Cardona (Bages), Catalonia, Spain

Characteristics
- Design: Vernacular (obra popular)

History
- Built: Old bridge: 13th century, rebuilt in the 15th; blown up in 1939. 1940s bridge: stone, three arches; still under construction in 1945. Present bridge: 1990
- Destroyed: 1939 (old bridge)

The Malagarriga Bridge crosses the river Cardener at the Malagarriga gorge, between Pinós (Solsonès) and Cardona (Bages), in Catalonia, Spain. The crossing has had three bridges. The old bridge, also called the Marbusca Bridge, was medieval and was blown up in 1939; its remains are protected as a Bé Cultural d'Interès Local, a locally listed heritage site. It was replaced by a three-arched stone bridge built in the 1940s, about 150 metres away, and the road now crosses on a bridge built in 1990.

== History ==
=== Origins ===
The old bridge dates back to the 13th century and was rebuilt in the 15th. Its history was gathered by Albert Fàbrega i Enfedaque, a historian from Súria and former president of the Centre d'Estudis del Bages, in an article on the old royal road from Manresa to Solsona, published in the journal Dovella in 2019. Fàbrega quotes the Efemérides de Cardona, written by Ramon Puig i Molins in 1869. According to Puig i Molins, the first record of the bridge dates from 1426, when "Constancia Gibert, in her will, leaves 20 sous for the work on the Marbusca bridge, which is being built anew". The same author says the bridge "is attributed to the Templars at the end of the 11th century or the beginning of the 12th".

The bridge originally had two arches. Puig i Molins describes it in the year 1500: "This year the two-arched bridge of Malagarriga already existed, which some believe was built in the time of the Crusades, because one keystone bears a cross with a sword hilt and the other a thistle, the arms of Cardona." It was 380 pams (Catalan palms) long, 21½ pams wide and 60 pams high, and its two arches spanned 112 and 96 pams. As late as 1850 a stone cross 32 pams high stood at one end of the bridge; it was pulled down when the road was opened.

=== Siege of 1711 ===
During the siege of Cardona in 1711, the pro-Habsburg troops sent to relieve the town reached the Malagarriga bridge on 10 December, crossed it and camped on the nearby plain. By 17 December about 4,300 men were there, and on the 21st they left Malagarriga.

The Cardener crossing at Malagarriga on an Austrian plan of the 1711 siege of Cardona, detail. Kriegsarchiv, Vienna, H III d 812.

=== Wars and the road, 1822–1851 ===
The bridge stands in the Malagarriga gorge and was always a strategic point. On 11 August 1822 rebels of the Regency of Urgell ambushed the Canarias and Murcia regiments there, which had taken supplies from Manresa to Cardona Castle. On 28 October of the same year, the military governor of Cardona took up a position on the bridge with 120 men against a force of 800 to 1,000 that held it, and kept up fire for three hours while a convoy crossed the river and entered the town.

According to a report of 1837, the bridge's parapets were destroyed in the war of those years, as had already happened in 1711 and 1822. On 3, 4 and 5 February 1838, during the First Carlist War, there was fighting at Súria and at the Malagarriga bridge. On 13 August 1838 the Carlists ambushed a division of the Liberal army there. According to the army's official report, that day the divisions leaving Cardona with a convoy of salt and wounded were attacked in the gorge above the bridge, and the fighting lasted until noon. In 1839 a memorandum on how to attack Berga, published in the press, listed the bridge among the points on the Manresa road where convoys could be attacked.

In July 1848, during the Second Carlist War, also called the War of the Matiners, the 6th Tarifa light infantry battalion and a column of the Constitución regiment fought the bands of Castells and the Tristanys there; the action lasted until eleven at night. In 1849 the Matiners kept a customs post on the bridge, where they charged a fee on every fanega of salt leaving the Cardona salt works.

In 1851 the bridge was fully fitted for the Manresa road: on 7 April that year the contract for the sixth section of the Manresa–Cardona road, 5,750 varas long, between the Rata inn and the Malagarriga bridge, was awarded in Barcelona.

=== Destruction in 1939 ===
A bridge blown up in 1939 on the Manresa–Solsona road, possibly the one at Malagarriga. La Vanguardia Española published the photograph on 8 September 1939 without saying which bridge it was.

The bridge was destroyed with explosives in January 1939 by the retreating Republican army, as Franco's troops advanced on Cardona. In February 1940 the press included Malagarriga in a list of bridges blown up in Catalonia during the retreat. According to an account collected in Cardona oberta, the stone of the demolished bridge was bought to build the Cinema Modern in Cardona, next to the Fonda Bellavista.

=== Later bridges ===
According to Cardona oberta, on 23 November 1940 the mayors of Cardona, Súria, Clariana and Solsona, together with Unión Española de Explosivos, Minas de Cardona and Transports Galtanegra, asked the Under-Secretariat of the Ministry of Public Works to build a new bridge. The work was approved on 12 December with a budget of 276,000 pesetas and was carried out by the firm Cubiertas y Tejados using prisoners of war. In the meantime, the river was crossed by a cable with small wagons. The new bridge, of stone with three arches and a flat deck, stands about 150 metres from the remains of the old one. Fàbrega dates it to 1940; the Architectural Heritage Inventory of Catalonia records it as still under construction in 1945. The works can be seen in two photographs from 1941. According to Fàbrega, the road now crosses the river on a bridge built in 1990.

== Remains ==
The remains of the old bridge lie in both municipalities, Cardona and Pinós, at the southern end of Cardona, on waste ground surrounded by woodland. They are reached from the C-1410 road: at kilometre 26, a dirt track runs beneath the new road. They are about 150 metres from the 1940s bridge.

Only the abutments on either bank and a small part of the deck survive. The outer facing is of finely dressed ashlar bound with lime mortar. At the base, the remains are 4 metres wide.
