= Jaume Mas =

Jaume Mas was the Bishop of Vic in Tarragona, Spain (1674–1684).

Catholic Church titles
Preceded by Jaume de Copons i de Tamarit	Bishop of Vic; 1674-1684	Succeeded by Antoni Pascual
