= Bernat Calbó =

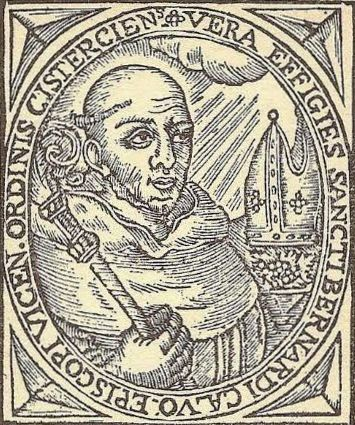
Bernat Calbó

Bernat Calbó (or Calvó) (c. 1180 – 26 October 1243), sometimes called Bernard of Calvo, was a Catalan jurist, bureaucrat, monk, bishop, and soldier.

Born and educated in Manso Calvo near Reus, Bernat belonged to a family of the knightly class and early on served as a jurist and functionary at the curia of the Archdiocese of Tarragona. In 1214 he became a Cistercian monk at the monastery of Santes Creus, eventually being elected its first abbot and, in 1223 or 1233, Bishop of Vich. In 1238 he and his episcopal household joined the Crusade of Reconquista launched against the taifa of Valencia.

Bernat brought material aid to the sieges of Burriana and Valencia. When the latter fell to the forces of James I of Aragon, Bernard and his troops joined the rest for a celebratory first Mass in the central mosque of the city. He received many grants of land in the Kingdom of Valencia, which he visited a second time in 1242. Still a jurist, he helped to publish the Valencian laws, the so-called Furs of Valencia, before his death at Vich in 1243. He was buried in the Cathedral of Vic. In 1260 he was beatified by Pope Alexander IV and on 26 September 1710 he was canonised by Pope Clement XI. The Cistercians celebrate his feast day is on 24 October; the diocese of Vich on 26 October. He is usually represented as a bishop in a Cistercian habit.

== Sources ==
- Burns, Robert Ignatius. The Crusader Kingdom of Valencia: Reconstruction on a Thirteenth-Century Frontier. Cambridge, Massachusetts: Harvard University Press, 1967. See page 309.
