= Diocese of Vic =

Roman Catholic diocese in Spain

Coordinates: 41.9281°N 2.2556°E

Diocese of Vic Dioecesis Vicensis Diócesis de Vich (es) Diòcesi de Vic (ca)

Catholic
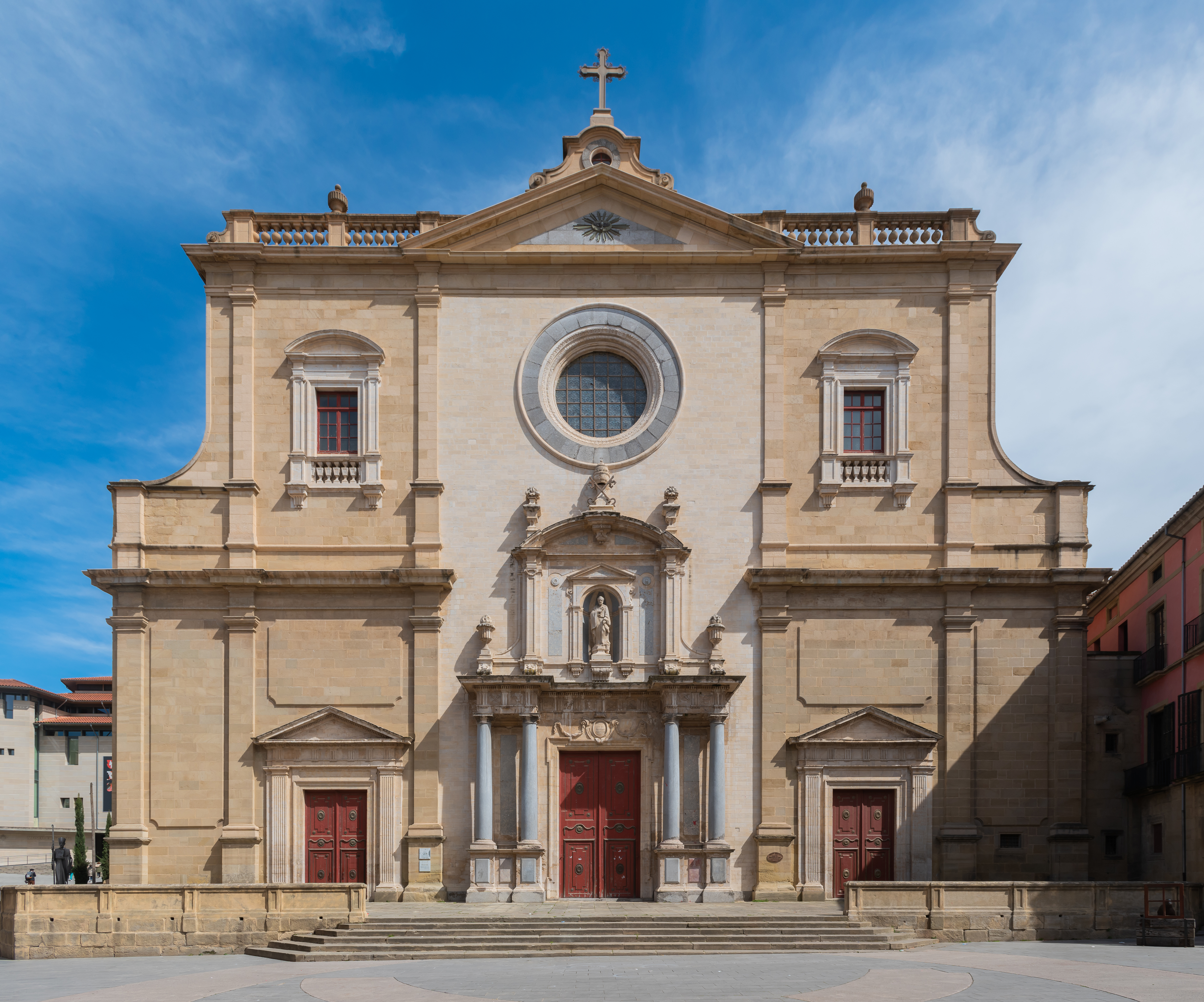
- Vic Cathedral

Location
- Country: Spain
- Ecclesiastical province: Tarragona
- Metropolitan: Tarragona

Statistics
- Area: 3,964 km^{2} (1,531 sq mi)
- Population: Total; Catholics: (as of 2023); 456,827 ▲; 412,029 ▲ (90.2%)
- Parishes: 249

Information
- Denomination: Roman Catholic
- Rite: Latin Rite
- Established: 5th Century
- Cathedral: Cathedral Basilica of St Peter in Vic
- Secular priests: 113 (Diocesan) ▼28 (Religious Orders) ▼35 Permanent Deacons ▲

Current leadership
- Pope: Leo XIV
- Bishop: Romà Casanova Casanova
- Metropolitan Archbishop: Joan Planellas i Barnosell

Map

Website
- Website of the Diocese

The Diocese of Vic (Latin: Dioecesis Vicensis) is a Latin diocese of the Catholic Church with its seat in the city of Vic in the ecclesiastical province of Tarragona in Catalonia, Spain. Its cathedral is a basilica dedicated to Saint Peter.

== History ==
A diocese was first established at Vic in the fifth century. After the Islamic conquest of Spain in 711, the diocese was abandoned.

The diocese was re-established in 886, shortly after the official re-settlement of the Plain of Vic had begun in 878. According to one theory, the new diocese was a product of the initiative of the Sunyer II, count of Empúries, and Teuter, bishop of Girona, to spread their influence westward at the expense of Count Wifred I of Osona. It is more likely that the see was re-founded with the support of Wifred, who petitioned the archdiocese of Narbonne to accept it as a suffragan. Although Vic was the traditional capital of the County of Osona, the county and the bishopric were not coterminous. The monastery of Santa Maria de Ripoll, one of the most important in the diocese, lay within the County of Besalú. So long as the counts of Osona were also counts of Barcelona, they appointed viscounts to rule in Osona, and these usually resided at the castle of Cardona in the diocese of Urgell. As a result, the bishops of Vic came to control the city itself, blending public, private and ecclesiastical power there.

There is a surviving charter of King Odo dated 889, in which the king appears to grant the count of Osona to the bishop, but most of the text is of a later date and is unreliable. The king did grant the fortress at Artés to the bishop, as well as one third of public revenue in the county. By 911, when the will of Count Wifred II granted a third of the profits of the mints in Osona to the bishop, the latter had already replaced the viscount as the most powerful person in the county. During the reign of Louis IV (936–54), the bishop of Vic received royal confirmation of his monetary right. In 957, without any authority to do so, the bishop began keeping back all the profits of the mints for the church. Throughout the 10th century the counts of Osona sought to re-settle the west of the county and fortify the frontier. To this end they granted many frontier castles to the bishop to hold.

== Minor basilicas ==
- Basilica of Santa Maria, Igualada
- Basilica of Santa Maria de la Seu, Manresa

== Bishops ==
=== Medieval period ===
- 886–899 Gotmar, first bishop of the restored diocese
- 899–914 Idalguer
- 914–947 Jordi
- 948–957 Guadamir
- 957–971 Ató
- 972–993 Frujà
- 993–1010 Arnulf
- 1010–1017 Borrell
- 1017–1046 Oliba
- 1046–1076 Guillem de Balsareny
- 1076–1099 Berenguer Seniofred de Lluçà
- 1099–1101 Guillem Berenguer
- 1102–1109 Arnau de Malla
- 1109–1146 Ramon Gaufré
- 1147–1185 Pere de Redorta
- 1185–1194 Ramon Xetmar de Castellterçol
- 1195–1233 Guillem de Taverte
- 1233-1243 Saint Bernat Calbó
- ...
- 1410-1421 Alfons de Tous
- 1421-1423 Martin de Torres
- 1423-1423 Miquel de Navès
- 1424–1445 Jordi d'Ornós
- 1445-1459 Jaume Cardona
- ...

=== Modern period ===
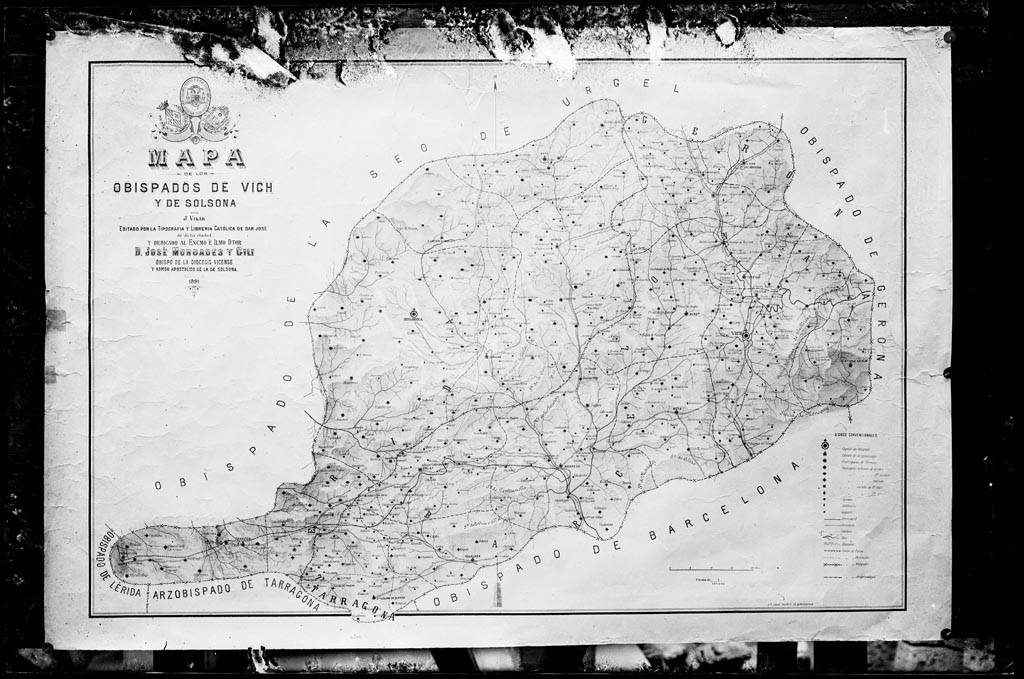
Map of the Diocese c. 1900

- Bishop Romà Casanova Casanova (since 2003.06.13)
- Bishop Josep Maria Guix Ferreres (1983.06.20 – 2003.06.13)
- Bishop Ramon Masnou i Boixeda (1955.12.02 – 1983.06.20)
- Bishop Joan Perelló i Pou, M.S.C. (1927.06.20 – 1955.07.27)
- Patriarch Francesc Muñoz i Izquierdo (1916.05.05 – 1925.12.14)
- Bishop Josep Torras i Bages (1899.06.19 – 1916.02.07)
- Bishop Josep Morgades i Gili (1882.03.27 – 1899.06.19)
- Bishop Pere Colomer i Mestres (1875.09.17 – 1881.08.30)
- Bishop Antoni Lluís Jordà i Soler (1866.01.08 – 1872.06.22)
- Bishop Joan-Josep Castanyer i Ribas (1857.12.21 – 1865.05.18)
- Bishop Antoni Palau i Térmens (1853.12.22 – 1857.09.25)
- Bishop Llucià Casadevall i Duran (1848.07.03 – 1852.03.10)
- Bishop Pau Jesús Corcuera i Caserta (1824.10.19 – 1835.07.03)
- Bishop Ramon Strauch i Vidal, O.F.M. (1816.09.23 – 1823.04.16)
- Bishop Francesc de Veyan i Mola (1783.12.15 – 1815.12.30)
- Bishop Antoni Manuel de Hartalejo López, O. de M. (1777.02.17 – 1782.06.18)
- Bishop Bartolomé Sarmentero, O.F.M. (1752.07.17 – 1775.12.06)
- Bishop Manuel Muñoz Guil (1744.07.13 – 1750.09.30)
- Bishop Ramon de Marimon i de Corbera-Santcliment (1720.12.16 – 1744.01.16)
- Bishop Manuel de Santjust Pagès (1710.02.19 – 1720.06.18)
- Bishop Antoni Pascual (1684–1704)
- Bishop Jaume Mas (1674–1684)
- Bishop Jaume de Copons i de Tamarit (1665–1674)
- Bishop Brauli Sunyer (1663–1664)
- Bishop Francesc Crespí de Valldaura i Brizuela (1656–1662)
- Bishop Ramon de Senmenat i Lanuza (1640.01.20 – 1655.10.25)
- Bishop Gaspar Gil i Miravete de Blancas (1634.11.20 – 1638.08.25)
- Bishop Pere de Magarola i Fontanet (1627.03.22 – 1634.03.22)
- Bishop Andrés de San Jerónimo, O.S.H. (1614.08.27 – 1625.09.28)
- Bishop Antoni Gallart i de Treginer (1612.03.19 – 1613.12.16)
- Bishop Onofre de Reard (1608.03.03 – 1611.12.19)
- Bishop Francesc Robuster i Sala (1598.05.05 – 1607.04.27)
- Bishop Joan Vila (1597.02.27 – 1597.09.24)
- Bishop Pere Jaime (1587.08.07 – 1597.03.10)
- Bishop Joan Baptista de Cardona (1584.07.04 – 1587.03.18)
- Bishop Pere d'Aragó (1577.01.14 – 1584.05.04)
- Bishop Bernat de Jossa i de Cardona, O.S.B. (1574.10.15 – 1575.09.21)
- Bishop Benet de Tocco, O.S.B. (1564.11.06 – 1572.09.05)
- Bishop Braulio Sunyer (1563.01.05 – 1567)
- Archbishop Acisclo Moya de Contreras (1554.07.06 – 1564.01.27)
- Bishop Joan de Tormo (1510.12.09 – 1553.01.01)
- Bishop Joan d'Enguera, O.P. (1505.12.19 – 1510.12.09)

== Churches ==
- Sant Jaume de Vallverd
