= Felip Vall i Verdaguer =

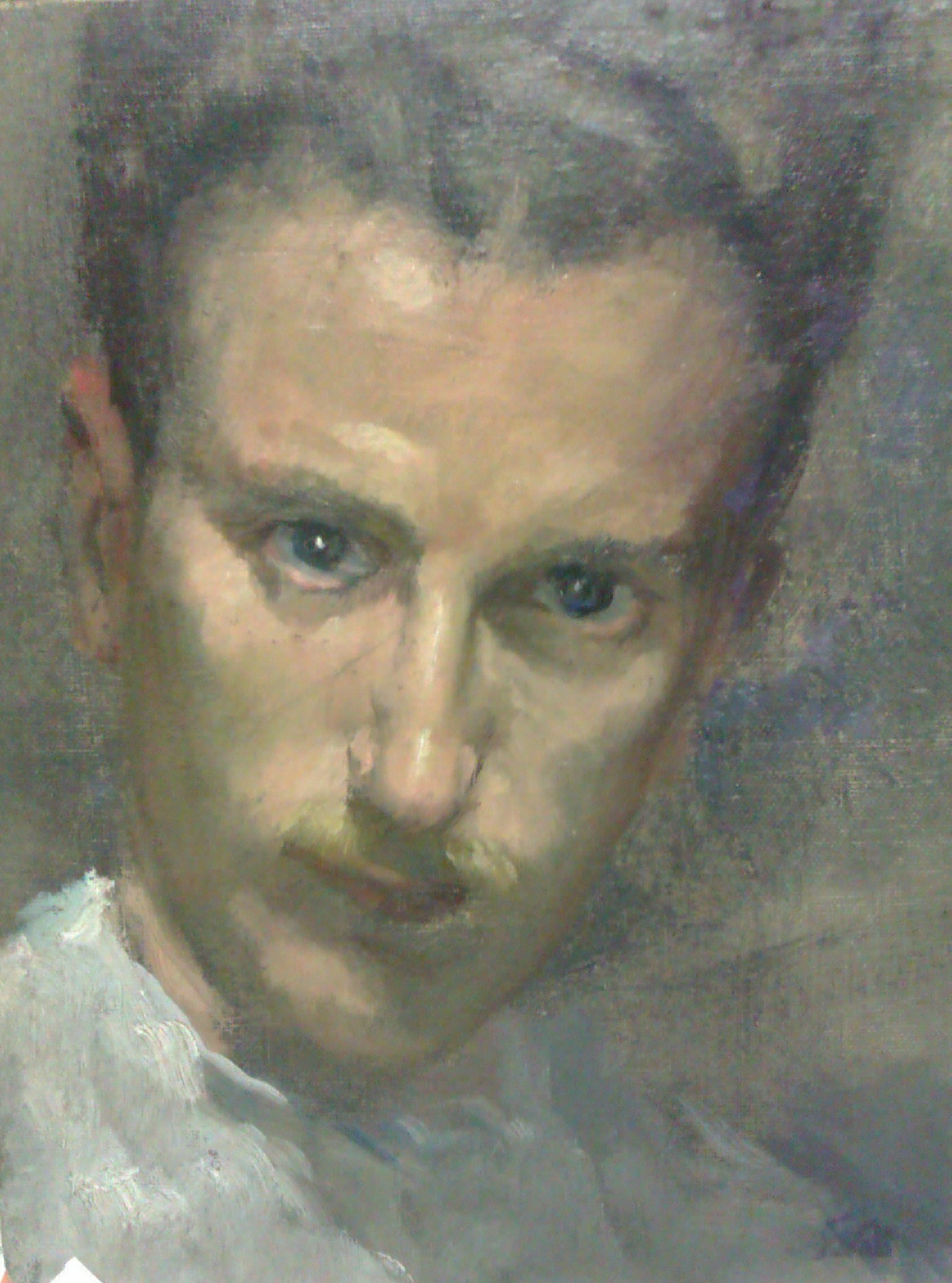

Felip Vall i Verdaguer (26 May 1916 in Tona, Catalonia (Spain) – 5 August 2012 in Vic) was a Spanish painter, decorator and designer who specialized in murals.

== Biography ==
He studied art at the St. George School of Fine Arts (later also called La Llotja) in Barcelona, where he was a disciple of the painters Ramon de Capmany and Josep Maria Marquès i Puig. He also trained at the Architecture and Industrial School, where he did a color chemistry course. He became a muralist and follower of Josep Maria Sert Badia.

In 1937, he painted Els Milicians a la Trinxera (Militants in The Trenches) during the Spanish Civil War. In 1938, he created the mural in the mayor's office of the Malla Town Hall. Gradually he began to receive commissions to decorate other buildings in the area. In 1947, he was chosen from many candidates to paint the vaulted ceiling of the Cathedral in Vic. The original model for this project is currently preserved in the Episcopal Museum in Vic Museu Episcopal de Vic. The final model is on show in the Chapel of the Holy Spirit cloister in the Vic cathedral, but he never got to paint the ceiling murals themselves due to lack of funding.

In 1949 Vall made a study trip to France. He settled in Paris where he worked for some time and extended his studies at the Ecole des Beaux-Arts. He found a girlfriend, Gisele Decoursière, who taught at the Institute Marie Curie in Paris. Furthermore, he lived in Paris until 1955, and during that time he had a number of exhibitions of his painting as well as his decorated furniture. Vall showed his furniture at Chez Christofle, in the Rue Royale in Paris, and he received commissions.

He was chosen to head the association of Spanish artists living in France, most notably when he headed the group of Spanish artist exhibiting in the 1954 Salon of Free Art (Art Libre) in Paris where he also exhibited along with Pablo Picasso, Alexis Hinsberger and 30 other artists who belonged to the along with intellectuals also living in France at the time. This exhibit was done as a tribute to Garcia Lorca.

Vall obtained an international patent for painting fur pelts, something that provided him with sufficient income to live in Paris all those years. Vall had previously worked in the family clothing business (Corses Maria and Confecciones Mariver) where he designed the logos, the drawings of the models and other elements. This business began in 1916. Vall also did illustrations for books including one called Se Habla Español Didier Publishers in France, 1952, and he did etchings and engravings for Montaner i Simon Publishers (1940-1960).

Later, he lived in Mallorca for several years, during which he had shows at the Costa Galleries in Palma. The owner of this gallery, Josep Costa, and his son became his art dealers until 1980. He also showed at the Llotja in Palma de Mallorca in 1960, and he painted a series of murals made with fabrics that were commissioned for the private home of Mr. Juan Homs in Cala d’Or.

Vall also gave lectures including "A New Modality For Painting Murals" in Lleida 1946 [15] as well as "The Origin of Pottery" in Mallorca in 1966, among others. For the centennial of The Atlàntida: In 1977, in the centenary of the award that the poet Jacint Verdaguer received, Felip Vall exposes at Diputació de Barcelona 12 paintings. Six of them were on show from 1977 to 1995 at the Casa-Museu Verdaguer in Vil·la Joana.

For seven months in 1996 he carried out the restoration of his own paintings at the church in Tona when he re-painted half of the 500m2.

== Outstanding work ==
He has murals, paintings and decorated furniture in Catalonia, France (especially Paris), Italy and United States of America:

- 1938 Mural in the Plenary Hall of the Town Hall of Malla painted during the Spanish Civil War. This is an allegory of the seasons.
- 1940 the Chapel of Sorrows in the country house Torrellebreta, in Malla.
- 1944-45 Decoration of the ceiling in the Holy Chapel of the Church of Sant Pere de les Puelles, in the old quarter of Barcelona. This is the second oldest church in Barcelona and the paintings were done to honor the millennium of the church's foundation.
- 1945 Decoration of the church in Sant Andreu Tona, with subsequent restoration of the main altar in 1996.
- 1947 The dining room of the Pradell Manor, Gurb, Vic (House of Ramon d'Abadal i de Vinyals)
- 1945 Mural in the Marist School of Valldemia, in Mataró where Felip Vall and his brothers studied during childhood.
- 1961 – Mural decoration of halls, stalls and amphitheater of the Diagonal cinema in Barcelona, for its opening on 24 February 1961.

== Awards and recognitions ==
- Diploma with bronze medal by the Society of Arts and Letters, City of Paris.
- In 1996 he received the "Milestone" award from the town of Tona in "recognition of his long and extensive activity on behalf of culture in the town of Tona, including his archaeological research in different excavations, promoting and directing the restoration of the castle and the Camp de les Lloses in this town as well as his performance in the historical documentary research about Tona, and his contributions to the field of painting".

== Retrospectives ==
- Retrospective in Can Sebastià. The Buxaderas-Grau Foundation. Tona. December 2013-January 2014.
- Felip Vall Verdaguer and the ceiling of the Vic Cathedral. [1] within VICCC Vic Catalan Capital of Culture 2016. Capella Fonda (Sala Sert) March 2016.
- L’Atlàntida of Felip Vall. Paintings and Drawings. Vall's Year in Tona 2016. Can Sebastià. April 2016 [2]
- Felip Vall paints women and children. Camp de les Lloses Museum. Tona. December 2016-January 2017.
