= Ramon Strauch i Vidal =

Roman Catholic bishop

Servant of God Ramon Strauch i Vidal OFM
- Bishop of Vic
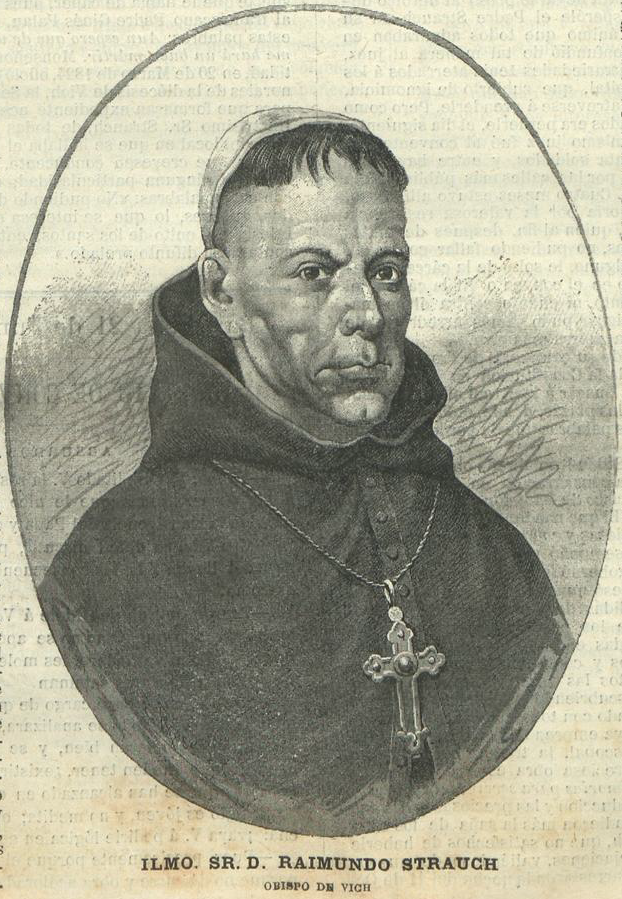
- Church: Roman Catholic Church
- Diocese: Vic
- See: Vic
- In office: 23 September 1816 - 16 April 1823
- Predecessor: Francisco Veyán y Mola
- Successor: Pablo Jesús Corcuera y Caserta

Orders
- Consecration: 12 January 1817 by Pablo Sitjar Ruata

Personal details
- Born: Ramon Strauch i Vidal; 7 October 1760 Tarragona, Spain
- Died: April 16, 1823 (aged 62) Vic, Spain

Sainthood
- Venerated in: Roman Catholic Church
- Title as Saint: Servant of God

Ramon Strauch i Vidal, O.F.M. (7 October 1760 – 16 April 1823), was a Roman Catholic Spanish bishop who served as the Bishop of Vic. He was killed in 1823 and his cause of canonization has commenced. The process started on 25 July 1933, and bestowed upon him the title of Servant of God.

== Biography ==
Ramon Strauch i Vidal was born to a Swiss soldier who served in Spain. He felt his religious vocation at the age of sixteen and entered a Franciscan convent. Vidal was made a professor in Mallorca in 1789 and remained there into the Peninsular War. He was an open liberal and was critical of the Cortes of Cádiz and his work. He was imprisoned because of this.

Pope Pius VII appointed Vidal as the Bishop of Vic in 1816 and he received episcopal consecration in 1817. Conflict in Vic in 1821 forced him to leave for a brief period of time in Sant Boi de Lluçanès. Vidal was shot dead in 1823 and his corpse left on the road. It was not collected from the road for two days. In his diocese, he was hailed as a martyr of the Christian faith.

== Cause of beatification ==
He was hailed as a martyr and there were calls for the commencement of his cause of canonization. That commenced under Pope Pius XI on 25 July 1933, thereby proclaiming him to be a Servant of God.
