= Sant Jaume de Vallverd =

Church of Sant Jaume de Vallverd Església de Sant Jaume de Vallverd
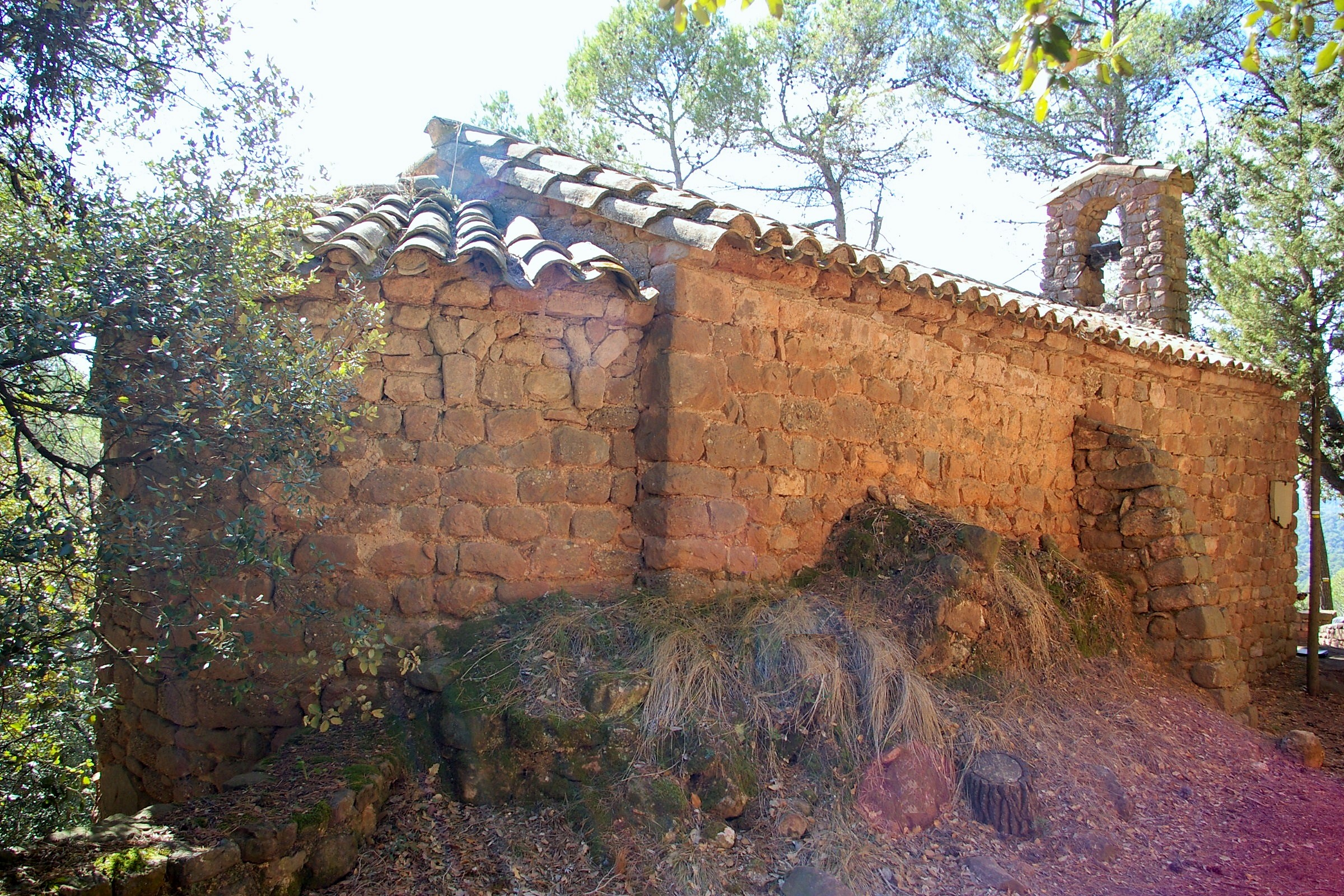

Religion
- Affiliation: Roman Catholic
- Province: Roman Catholic Diocese of Vic, Barcelona
- Rite: Roman
- Patron: St. James
- Year consecrated: March 1, 1976
- Status: Chapel

Location
- Location: Barcelona, Catalonia
- Interactive map of Church of Sant Jaume de Vallverd; Església de Sant Jaume de Vallverd
- Coordinates: 41.670837°N 2.081842°E

Architecture
- Type: Church
- Style: Romanesque

Sant Jaume de Vallverd is a Romanesque church located about fifty kilometers from Barcelona and four kilometers from the village of Sant Llorenç Savall in Vallès Occidental county (Catalonia).

In the 12th century, Bernat de Vallverd, a knight and landowner built the chapel next to his house. As stated in his will (1190 A.D.), the church would pass to his son Bernard with the commitment to hold mass there weekly and maintain a lamp perpetually lit inside. If these conditions were not met, the properties would pass to the monks of Sant Llorenç del Munt.

In the mid-17th century, five centuries after its construction, the church was completely in ruins. In the 19th century, only part of the apse and the south façade of the original chapel remained. In 1975, the owner of “La Busqueta”, a nearby farmhouse, decided to restore it, accurately replicating the structure of the original Romanesque building.

The church consists of a small single nave that retains two original structures from the 12th century: the apse and part of the barrel vault. It is possible to see the westernmost part of the barrel vault reconstructed with wooden beams. Noteworthy external decorative elements include a bell-less belfry and blind arches in the apse. Next to the chapel there is a cave with a barred gate, lending a mysterious presence to the site. On July 25, the feast of Sant Jaume (St. James) is celebrated in the chapel.
