= Josep Maria Sert =

Spanish painter

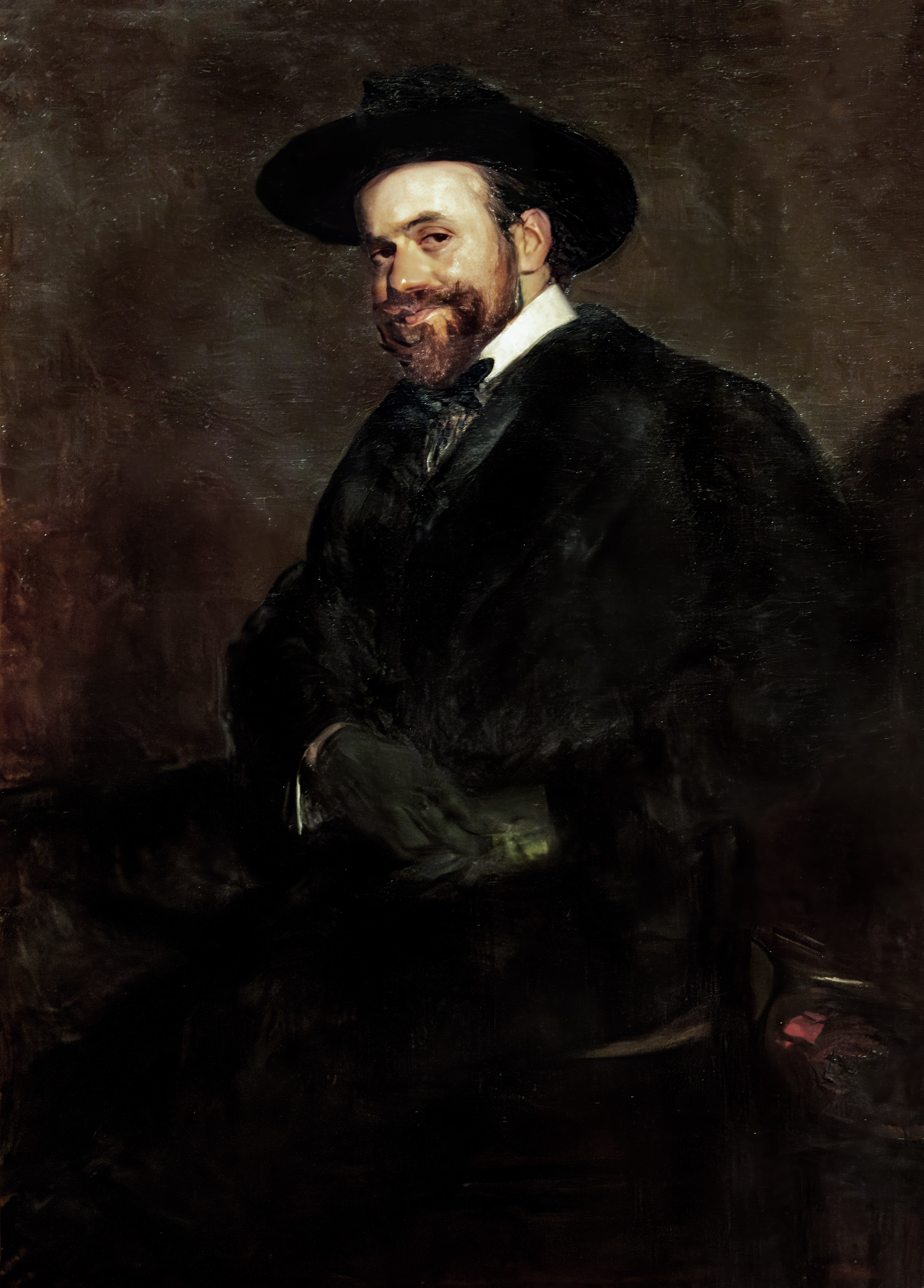
- Portrait of Sert by Jacques-Emile Blanche (MNAC)
- Born: Josep Maria Sert i Badia; 21 December 1874; Barcelona, Spain
- Died: 27 November 1945 (aged 70); Barcelona, Spain
- Resting place: Vic Cathedral
- Known for: Murals
- Style: Grisaille
- Movement: Baroque
- Spouses: Misia Godebska (m. 1914; div. 1927) Isabelle Roussadana Mdivani (m. 1928; died 1938)

Josep Maria Sert i Badia (Catalan pronunciation: [ʒuˈzɛb məˈɾi.ə ˈsɛɾt]; Barcelona, 21 December 1874 – 27 November 1945, buried in the Vic Cathedral), also quoted as José María Sert, was a Spanish muralist, the son of an affluent textile industry family. He was particularly known for his grisaille style, often in gold and black. His works had notable international success.

== Career ==
Josep Maria Sert was born on 21 December 1874, in the city of Barcelona. He initially studied art in Rome before moving to Paris in 1899. There, he became involved with a group of decorative artists known as Les Nabis, gravitating around Paul Ranson, who had studied at the private Académie Julian, founded in 1868 by painter Rodolphe Julian.

Sert was commissioned in 1900 to paint the interior of the Vic Cathedral in the Province of Barcelona, Catalonia in murals, which took him more than 30 years to complete.

By 1910, Sert had begun fully focusing on murals and other large-scale work. He collaborated with Russian Sergei Diaghilev to create sets for his Ballets Russes. In 1929 he was commissioned with the elaboration of a series of large format canvases painted in his signature grisaille style intending to cover the walls of the reconverted San Telmo church in San Sebastián; they portray different historic chapters of the Basques in an epic manner.

Sert's monochromatic painting accords with his use of the camera and black-and-white photographic media in his pictorial work between 1905 and 1945. That was confirmed in the mid-1980s by Michèle Chomette's discovery and 1988 exhibition, of a photographic archive depicting his models and props, such as articulated artist's dolls, taxidermied animals, cut-out drawings on paper or card, drapery, model ships, and seashells were copied, using a grid, into stage-like constructions for composing the mural paintings in which often the point of view, from below, was extreme. The vintage prints from the Gerd Sander estate, exhibited at the Georg Kolbe Museum in Berlin in 1996, and Galerie Julian Sander, Cologne in 2026, show retouching, redrawing, and grid lines that correspond to the contents of particular paintings.

In the United States, Sert painted a mural at the Waldorf-Astoria in New York City, as well as a 1937 mural entitled American Progress at 30 Rockefeller Center. American Progress was commissioned by the Rockefellers to replace Diego Rivera’s mural Man at the Crossroads, which Nelson Rockefeller destroyed because it included an image of Lenin. He later painted the walls and ceilings of the Council Chambers at the League of Nations in Geneva.

== Personal life ==
Sert began an affair with the well-known pianist and patron of the arts Misia Godebska in 1908. They married on 2 September 1920. In 1925, Sert met Georgian-Russian sculptor Isabelle Roussadana Mdivani, known as Roussy, who subsequently moved in with him and Misia. Sert began an affair with Roussy and later divorced Misia on 28 December 1927 to marry Mdivani.

Roussy and Sert were married in 1928 in a civil ceremony at the consulate in The Hague. In 1930, they were married in a religious ceremony at the Spanish church in Paris. After Roussy died in 1938, Sert reconciled with Misia and returned to life with her, though they kept separate apartments.

Sert died on 27 November 1945 in Barcelona, and left his apartment and furnishings to Misia.

== Gallery ==
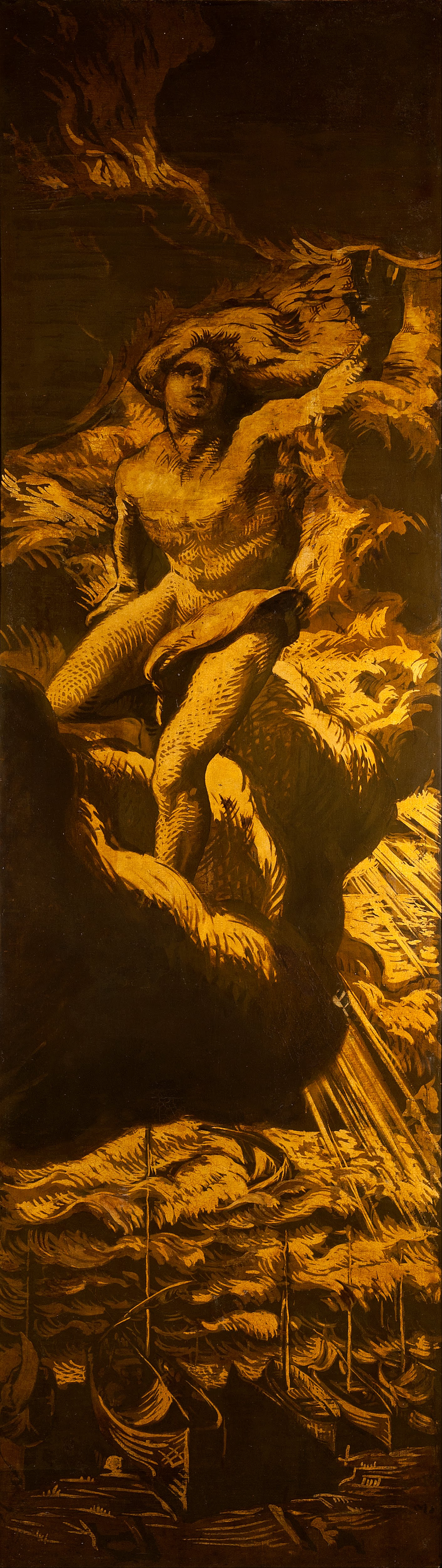
Apollo flying through the Clouds (1913)

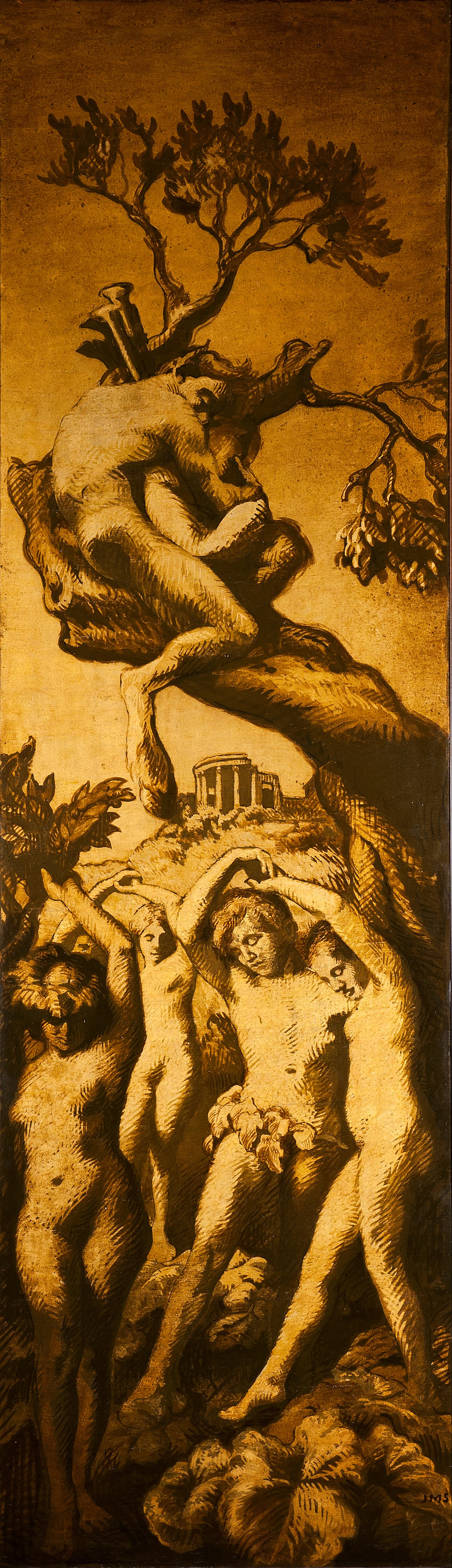
Satyr watching some Nymphs dancing (1913)

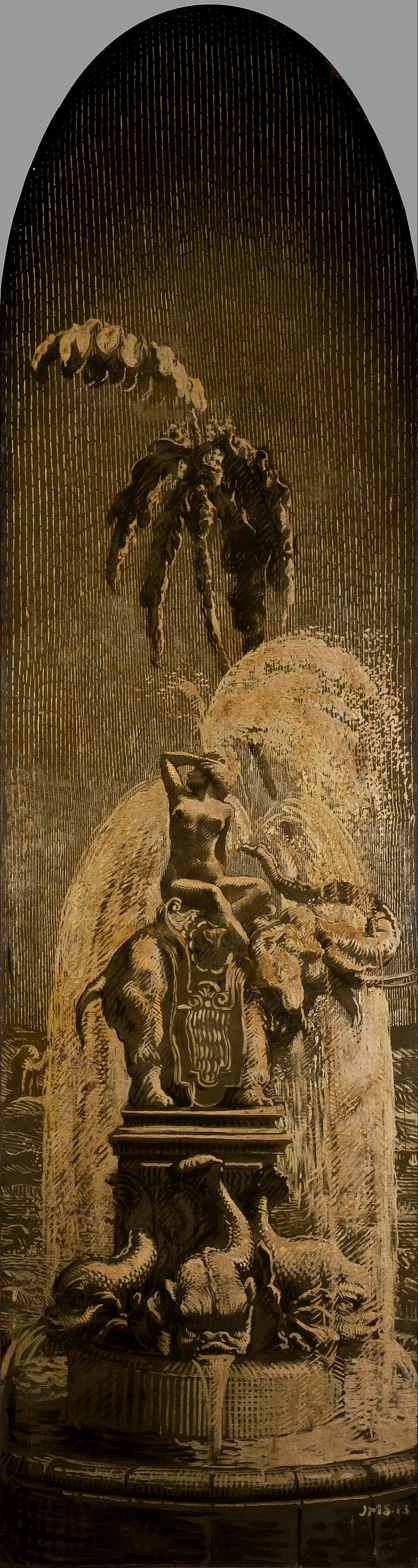
The Elephant Fountain (1913)

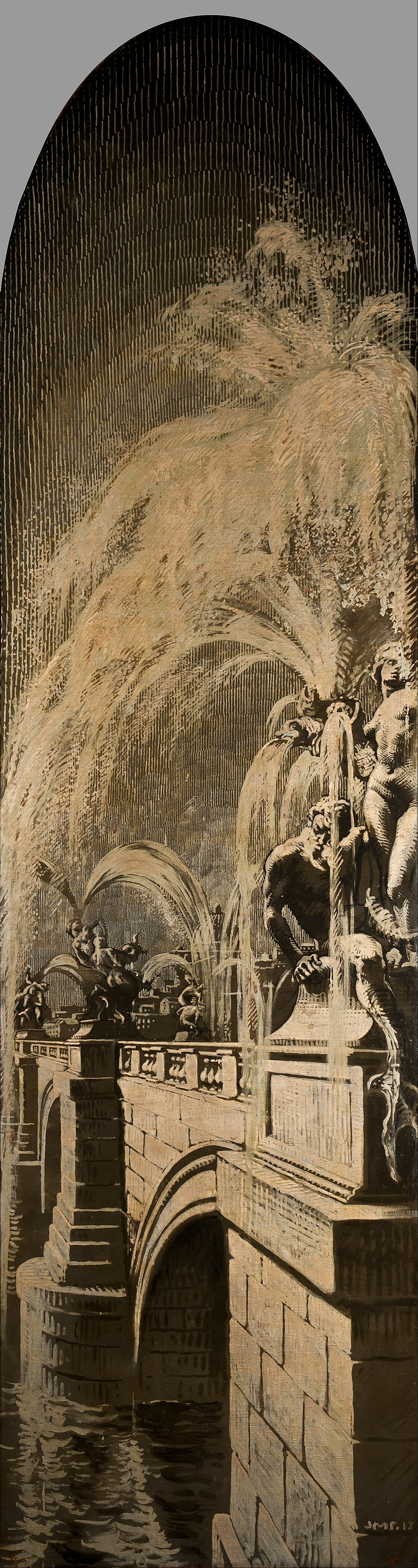
The Fountains Bridge (1913)

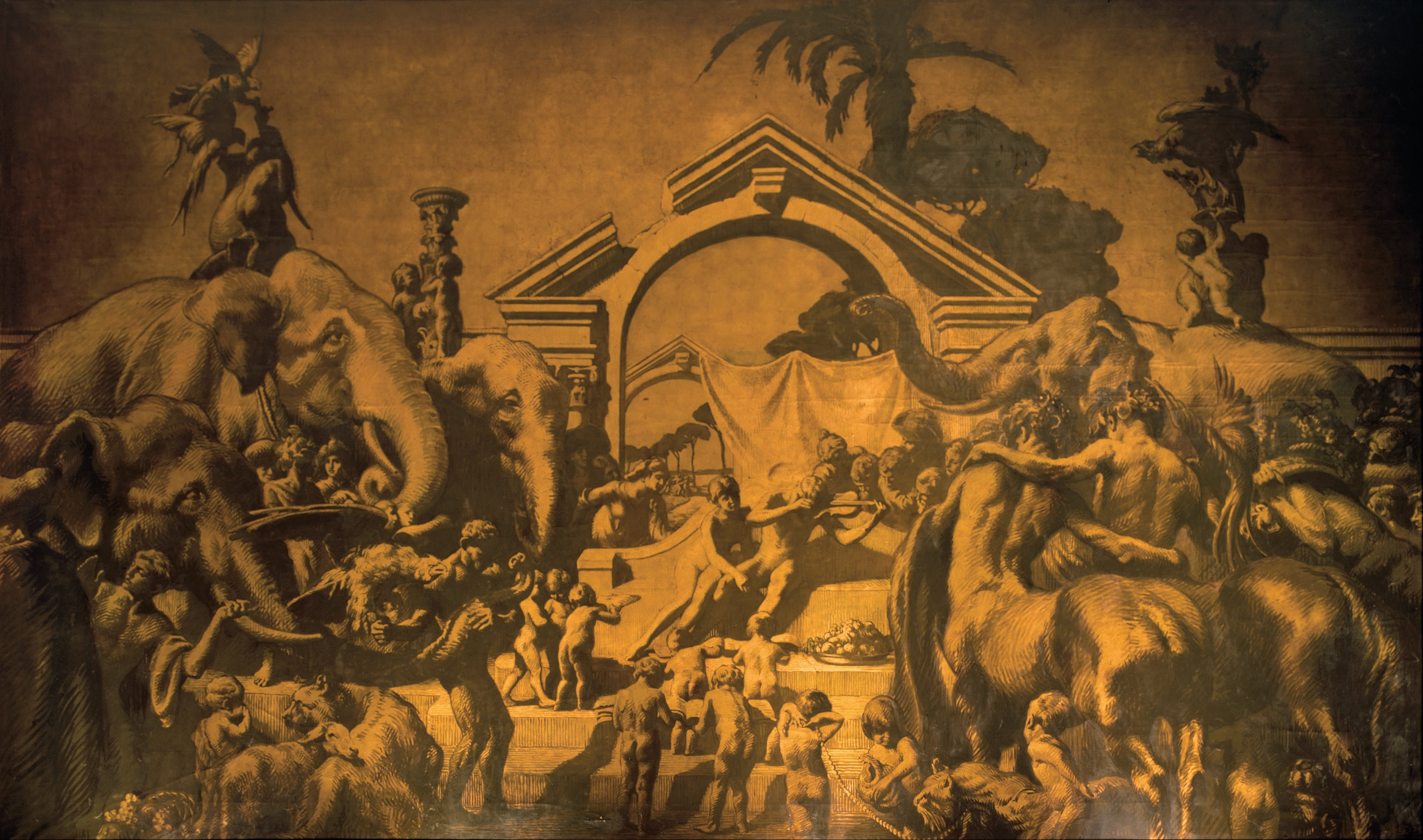
The Triumph of Apollo (1913)

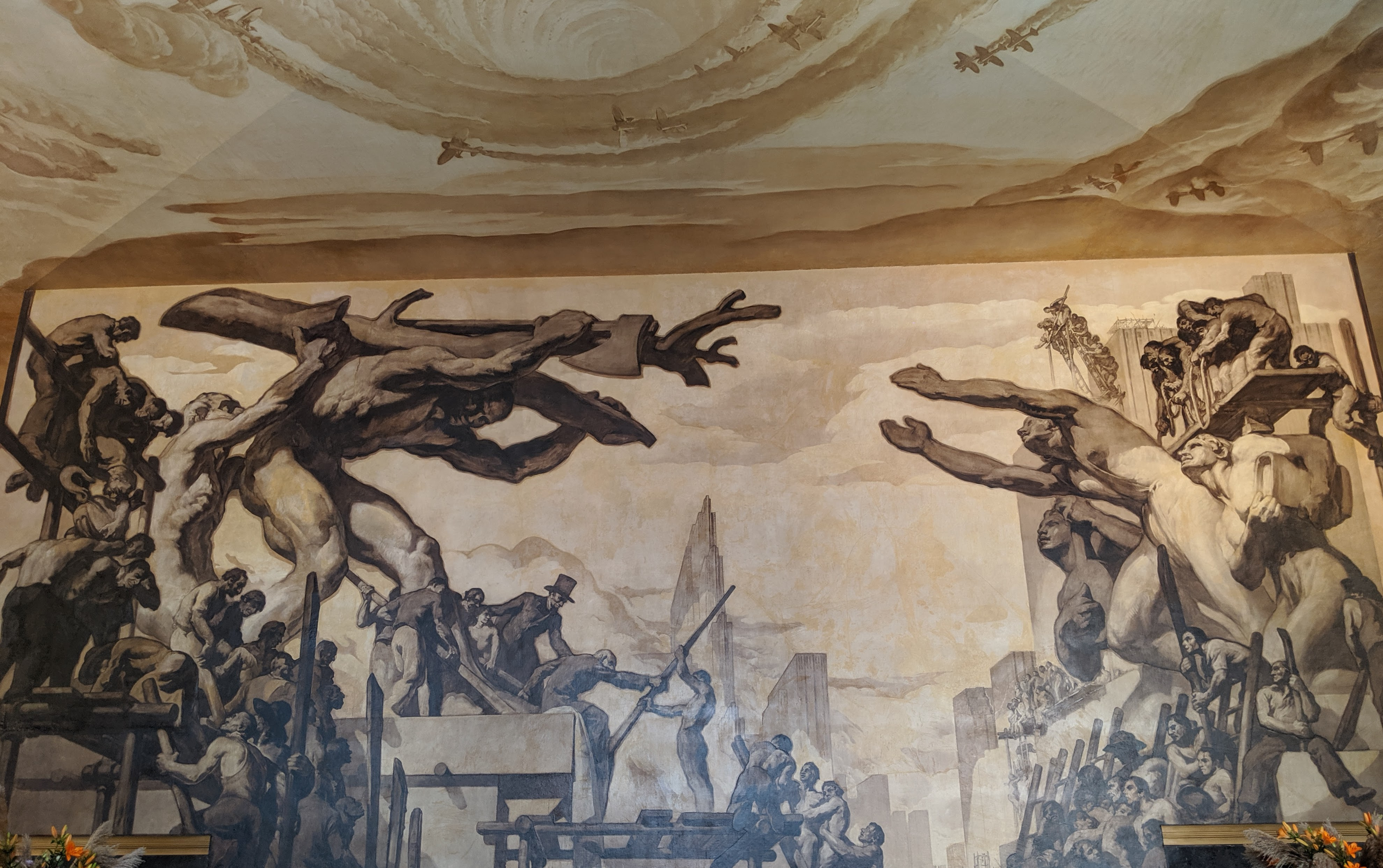
American Progress, the Triumph of Man's Accomplishments Through Physical and Mental Labor (1937)
