= Vic Cathedral =

- Cathedral of St. Peter of Vic
- Catalan: Catedral de Vic
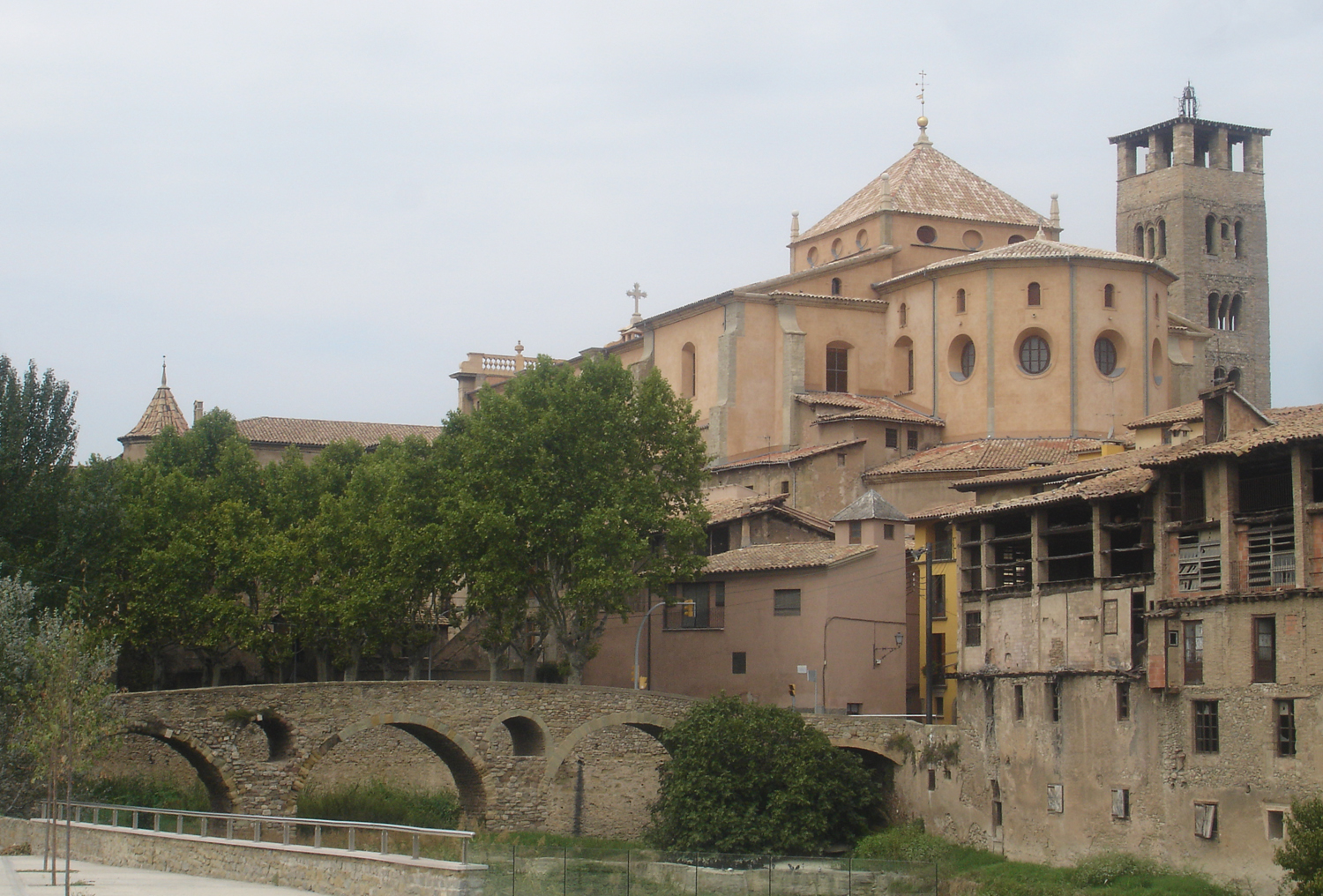
- Vic Cathedral seen from the river

- Location in Vic, Catalonia
- 41.9281°N 2.2556°E
- Location: Vic, Catalonia
- Country: Spain
- Denomination: Roman Catholic

History
- Status: Cathedral, minor basilica
- Consecrated: 1038 and September 15, 1803

Architecture
- Architect: Josep Moretó i Codina
- Architectural type: Church
- Style: Romanesque, Gothic, Neoclassical
- Groundbreaking: September 24, 1781
- Completed: 1803

Specifications
- Materials: Marble, brick

Administration
- Archdiocese: Roman Catholic Diocese of Vic

Clergy
- Archbishop: Bishop Romà Casanova Casanova

UNESCO World Heritage Site
- Reference no.: RI-51-0000432
- Spain
- Region: Europe and North America

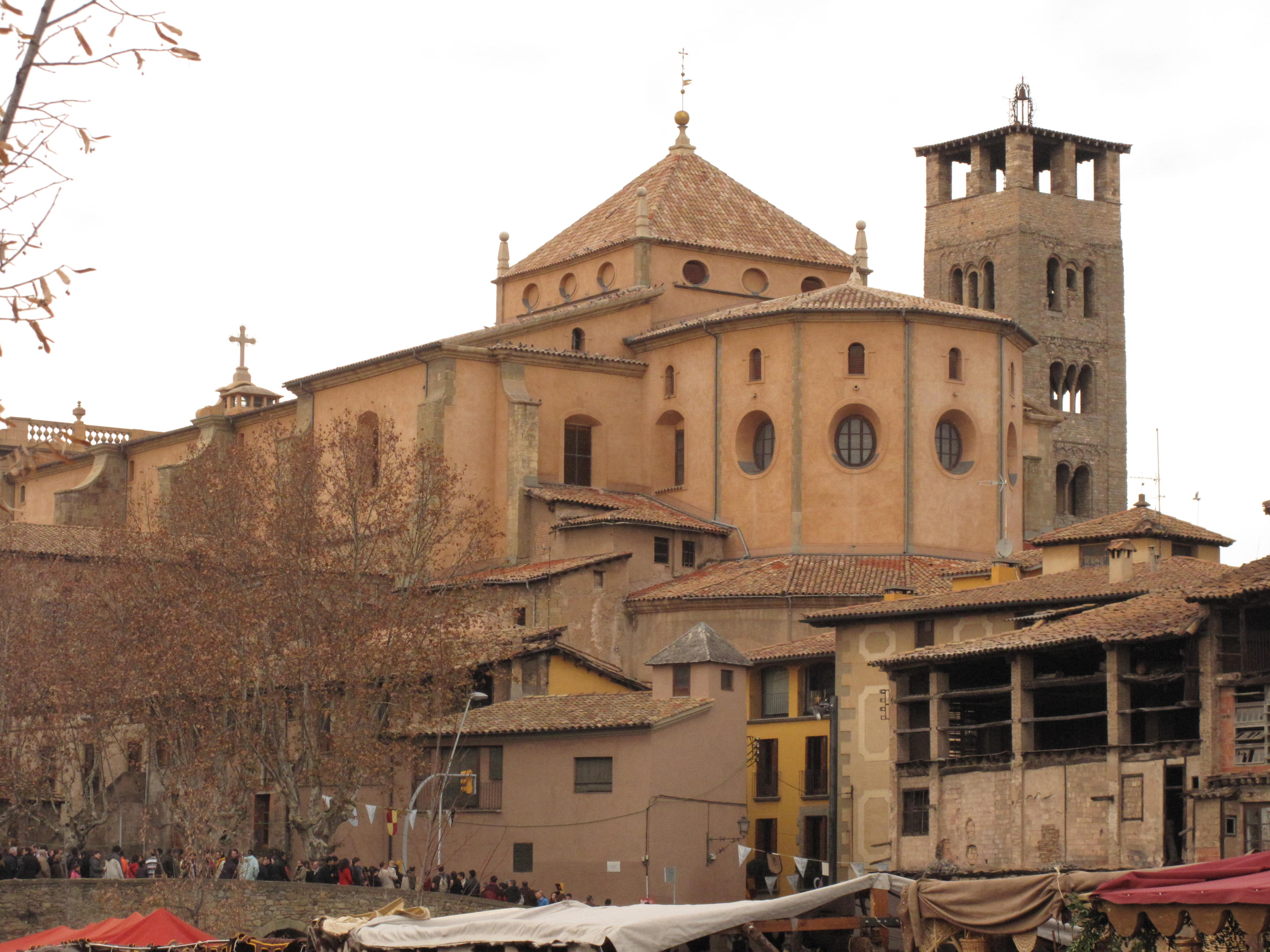
The cathedral from the river

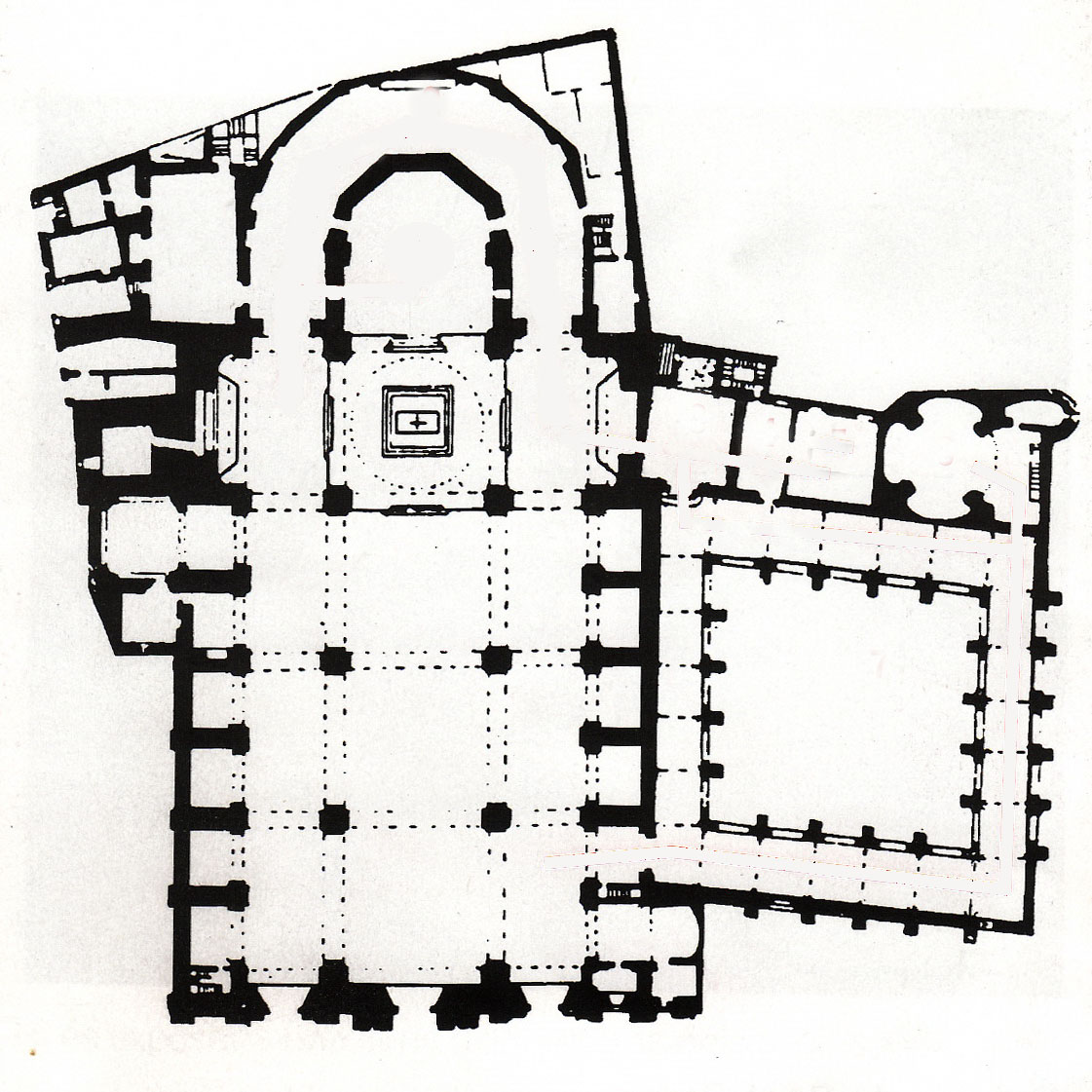
Ground Plan

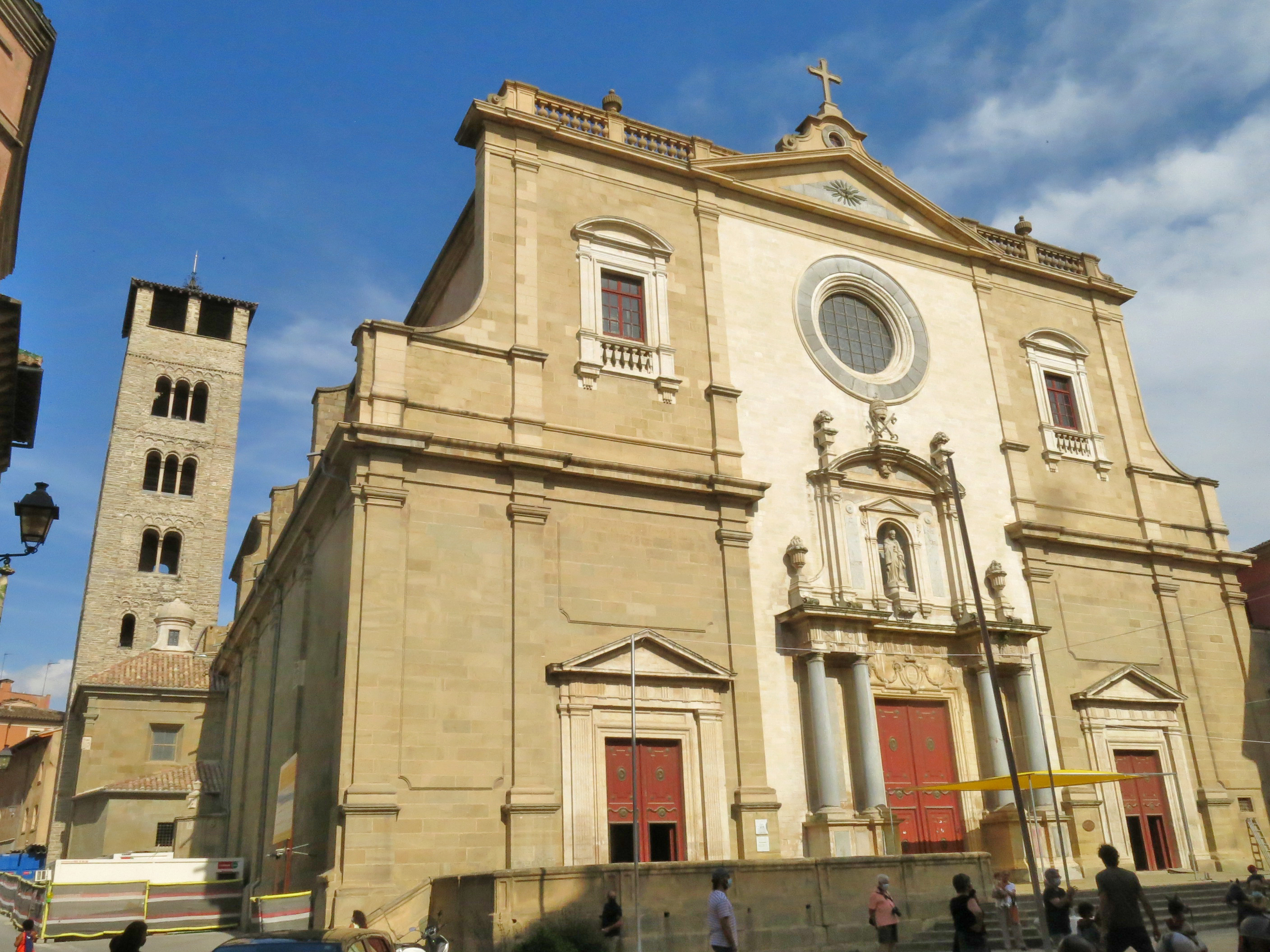
Cathedral of Vic

Vic Cathedral (Catalan: Catedral de Vic), officially the Cathedral of St. Peter the Apostle (Catalan: Catedral de Sant Pere Apòstol), is a Roman Catholic cathedral in Vic, Catalonia, Spain. It is the seat of the Diocese of Vic.

It has a mix of Romanesque, Gothic, Baroque and Neoclassic styles.

== History ==
=== Origins ===
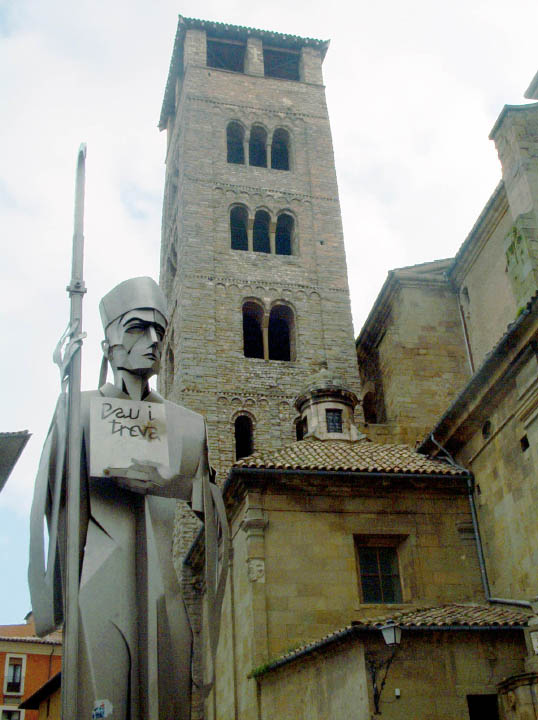
Romanesque bell tower of the Cathedral of Vic. In the first place, the sculpture of Abat Oliba.

Nobody knows for sure where the primitive paleochristian and later visigothic basilica once stood, but a cathedral in Vic appears documented at least from the year 516. It was most likely destroyed during the Arab invasion of 717-718. A provisional rammed earth church was built in 886 when count Wilfred the Hairy repopulated the area and restored the bishopric.

In the 10th century, with the Christian border more firmly stablished, the cathedral was rebuilt, this time of stone, and featuring three naves and two accompanying sister churches, devoted to the Saint Mary and Saint Michael.

=== The Cathedral of Oliba ===
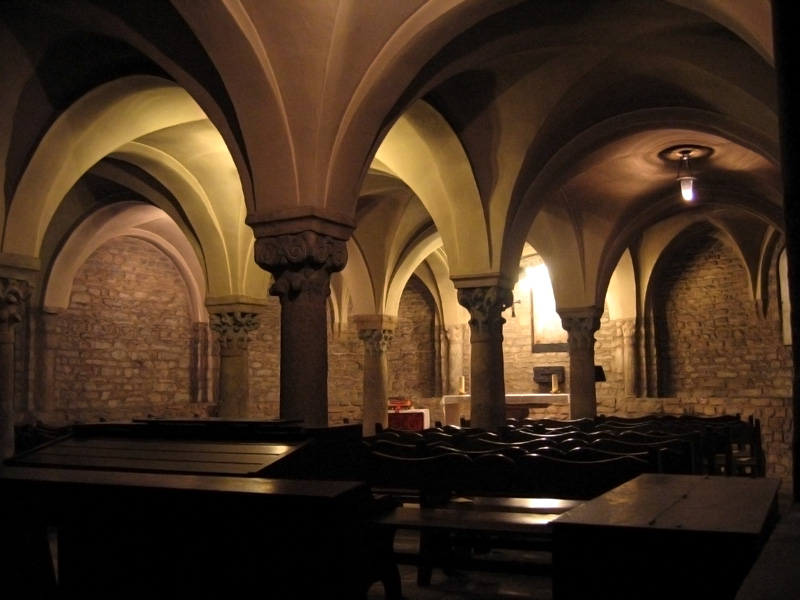
Crypt of the cathedral.

Just a century later the cathedral was rebuilt again by bishop Abat Oliba in a monumental Romanesque style. It was consecrated in 1038 by Archbishop Wilfred of Narbonne. The bell tower, 46 meters high, was separated from the main building. From this period only the bell tower and the crypt have remain today. The crypt is notable for displaying preromanesque style capitals that were probably sourced from the 10th century temple. In addition, in the Episcopal Museum of Vic, there are some reliefs with figures from the Romanesque portal and capitals from the cloister, of great sculptural quality.

Two hundred years later, Ramon d'Anglesola wrote a pastoral letter urging the faithful to contribute to the repair of the building. The cathedral did not experience a Gothic style reconstruction like most other European cathedrals, but it got its upper cloister, started in 1318, and main alabaster altarpiece, finished by Pere Oller in 1428. Both works can still be witnessed today in the building. In 1401 Bishop Diego de Heredia added a transept, and in 1585 the door of Saint John opened on its northern side.

=== Santa Maria la Rodona ===
Built as a sister church of the cathedral, the atypical round temple was a prominent feature for many centuries. By instance, the bishops celebrated the first Christmas Mass at Santa Maria and the third at St. Peter's. The church, like the cathedral, had many reconstructions, but the final one was performed by the canon Guillem Bonfil in 1140, and was consecrated forty years later by the bishop Pere de Redorta. It was demolished in 1787 to make room for the new cathedral. It was in the present Square of the Cathedral, in front of the façade: on the pavement one can see the marks of its location, finally stablished as a result of recent excavations that left the foundations in the open.

=== The current cathedral ===
The first stone of the new church was laid on September 24, 1781, and was consecrated on September 15, 1803. The project is the work of the Vic-born architect Josep Moretó i Codina, in academic neoclassical style.

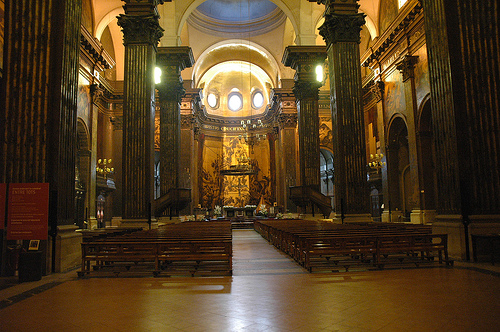
Inside the Cathedral of Vic, with the ships and paintings of Sert

In 1891, the Episcopal Museum of Vic opened on the upper floor of the cathedral's cloister.

After a tumultuous 19th century that left the cathedral severely impoverished, in the 20th century, Josep Maria Sert was commissioned to decorate the bare walls and ceilings of the interior. Sert finished the paintings on all the walls in 1930 and, in 1931, the cathedral was declared Historic Artistic Monument. Shortly after, at the start of the Spanish Civil War in 1936, the cathedral was burned down by revolutionary mobs and most of the vaulting collapsed. Just after the war the repair works of the cathedral began, the crypt was rediscovered, and an ambulatory built. Josep Maria Sert re-painted the walls. The temple reopened in 1945.

== Architecture ==
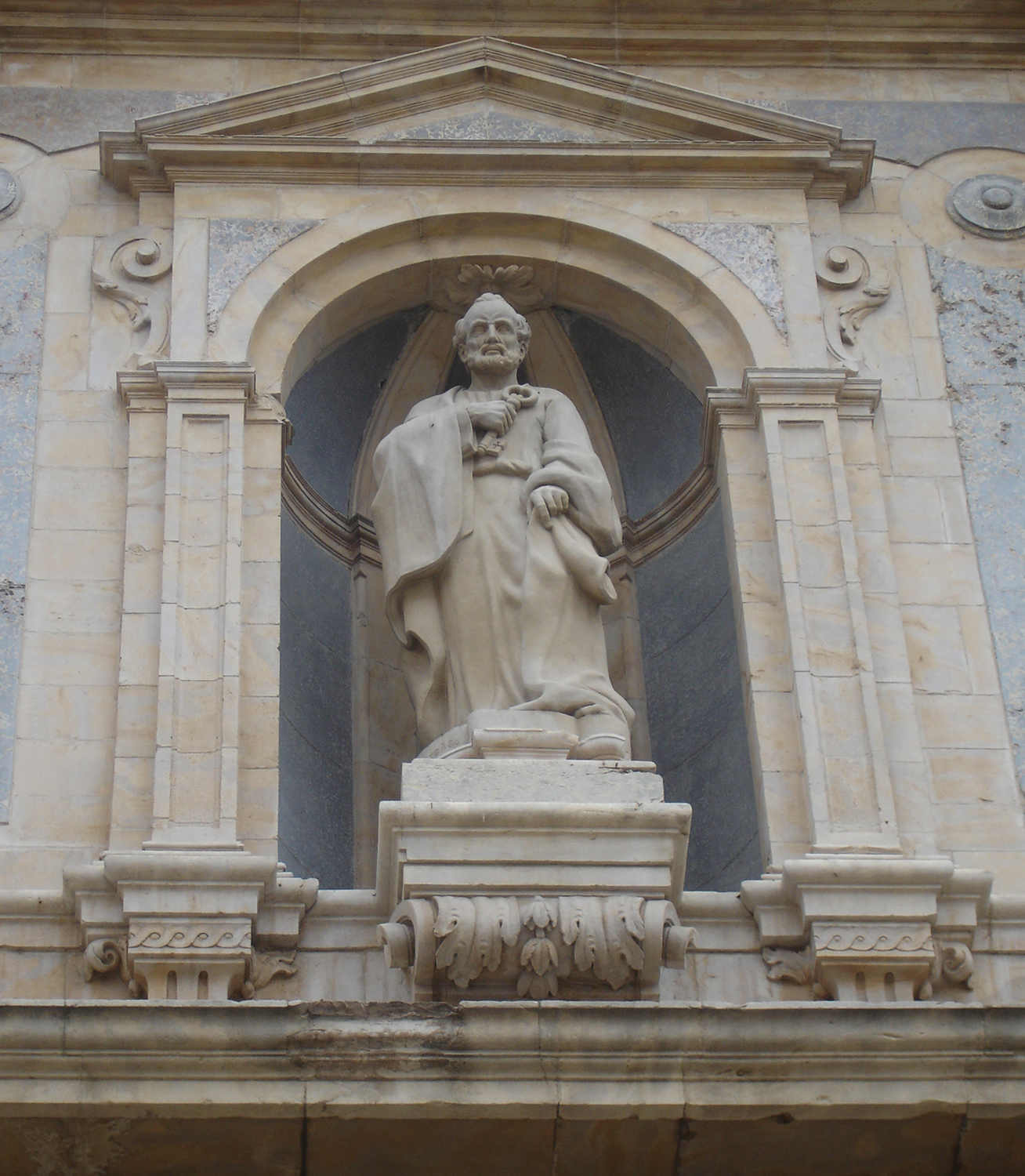
Figure of Sant Pere, with a key in his hand, by Joan Seguranyes

It is a building of a severe and cold neoclassical style, excessively academic. It combines Doric and Tuscan styles, with a white stone facade enriched with a balustrade. The facade of the cathedral dates from the remodeling of 1803, in a neoclassical style. On the upper part there is a central rosette, decorated with Romanesque archivolts that are used by the old cathedral, and flanked by two windows. It has three entrances, corresponding to the three naves. The central nave facade is the most ornate, with pilasters and pediment, and the sculpture of Saint Peter, patron saint of the temple.

In general, the work is not well regarded by scholars, who consider it disproportioned. The architectural ornamentation is poor and routine, as well as contradicting some principles of the application of classical orders.

=== Interior ===
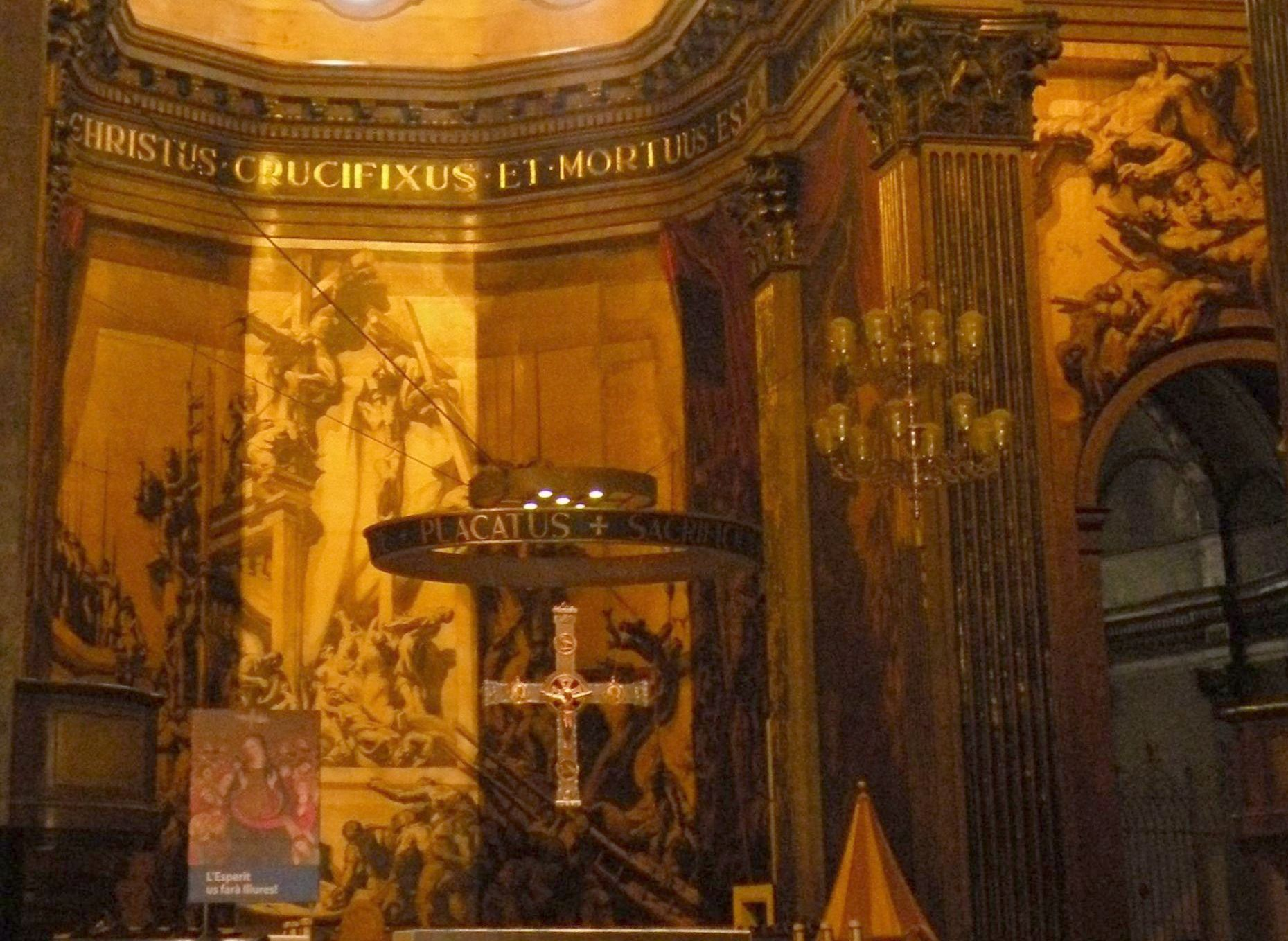
Apse with paintings.

The interior consists of three naves of the same height, separated by Corinthian pilasters (with clearly disproportionate dimensions between the architrave shards and the set of capitals and pillars), a pronounced transept, a semicircular vault deck and a dome in the cruise, and the polygonal apse. The side naves have series of two chapels under each round of vaults.

=== Paintings by Sert ===
In the first half of the 20th century, the decoration of the great white walls was commissioned by the Catalan painter Josep Maria Sert, who worked between 1926 and 1930, when he finished them and presented the project for the paintings of the vaults. Large oil-painted canvases were placed on the walls. The 1936 fire, at the beginning of the Civil War (1936-1939), destroyed Sert's work - many graphic documents are preserved - and considerably damaged the vaults and the dome of the nave. Josep Maria Sert carried out a new decoration, which we can contemplate today, between 1939 and 1945. Dying just before he could finish the last paintings, his disciples completed them following his style. In general, the style of the second version is less colorful.

Like the first version, they are huge canvases set on the walls of the cathedral. With the characteristic style of Sert, the masses and voluminous figures predominate, with great force, with a great contrast of chiaroscuro. Almost monochromatic, it emphasizes in the golden colors and the ranges of brown and ocher, with touches of red. The game of volumes and this chromatic treatment creates a sense of depth.

The iconography program responds to a cycle of the mystery of redemption (in the first version, it focused on the exaltation of Christ and the Church). In the polyps of the apse, which follows the polygonal plant, the crucifixion of the Lord is seen, between the scenes of his burial and ascension. The four scenes of the cycle regarding the loss of original justice and the fall of Adam and Eve continue on the walls of the cruise. On the arches of the side chapels, scenes of the martyrdom of the apostles and evangelists are developed. In the triptych formed by the walls of the feet of the cathedral, the subjects that represent Jesus expelling the merchants of the temple are opposed, and he himself coming out with the cross on the shoulder, flanking the central scene that represents the sentence pronounced by Pilate.

On the lunettes of the overcrowding, his assistant, Miquel Massot i Tetas, reproduced the songs of the Beatitudes that his master had made in the decoration destroyed by the burning of 1936. In 1947 the painter Felip Vall i Verdaguer won the competition to decorate the vaults of the cathedral but he could not secure the funding and the project did not materialize. A model and several sketches and preparatory drawings are preserved in this project.

=== Altarpiece ===
The main altarpiece of alabaster, dated between 1420 and 1427, is the main wall of the girola, the work of Pere Oller dedicated to the Virgin Mary and Saint Peter. It was given at the beginning of the fifteenth century, by Bernard Despujol.

=== Chapels ===
On the north side of the temple there are a number of Baroque chapels, which are the first part built of a project from the beginning of the 17th century to a new cathedral.

In particular, the chapel of Sant Bernat Calbó, under the bell tower, is the work of the architect of Mataró Jaume Vendrell (1633). Saint Bernat Calbó had been bishop of Vic between 1233 and 1243 and participated with James I of Aragon in the conquest of Valencia. His body rests on a large silver-plated ballot box, the work of the goldsmith Joan Matons made between 1700 and 1728.

In the chapel of the Virgin of Montserrat is the tomb of Bishop Josep Torras i Bages and a dead Christ is from Josep Llimona i Bruguera.

=== Crypt ===
The crypt dates from the Romanesque cathedral consecrated in 1038. The capitals are still older, since they took advantage of the ancient pre-Romanesque cathedral.

=== Cloister ===
Regarding the primitive cloister, it is divided into two floors, a Romanesque inferior from the 12th century and a Gothic superior from the 14th century built by the teachers Despuig, Lardenosa and Valls. In great beauty, it has a unique gallery with double windows, open in the interior of the cloister and out in the city. It also conserves the gothic door that leads to the chapter room.

The lower cloister opens the chapter room consecrated in 1360, with a rectangular ground plan covered by an octagonal vault with a small square apse in the background. In the center of the cloister we find the grave of the Catalan philosopher born in Vic Jaume Balmes, crowned by a statue made in 1853 by Josep Bover, for the cemetery of the city, and moved to the cloister in 1865.

== See also ==
Josep Maria Sert
