= Sant Llorenç Savall =

- Municipality
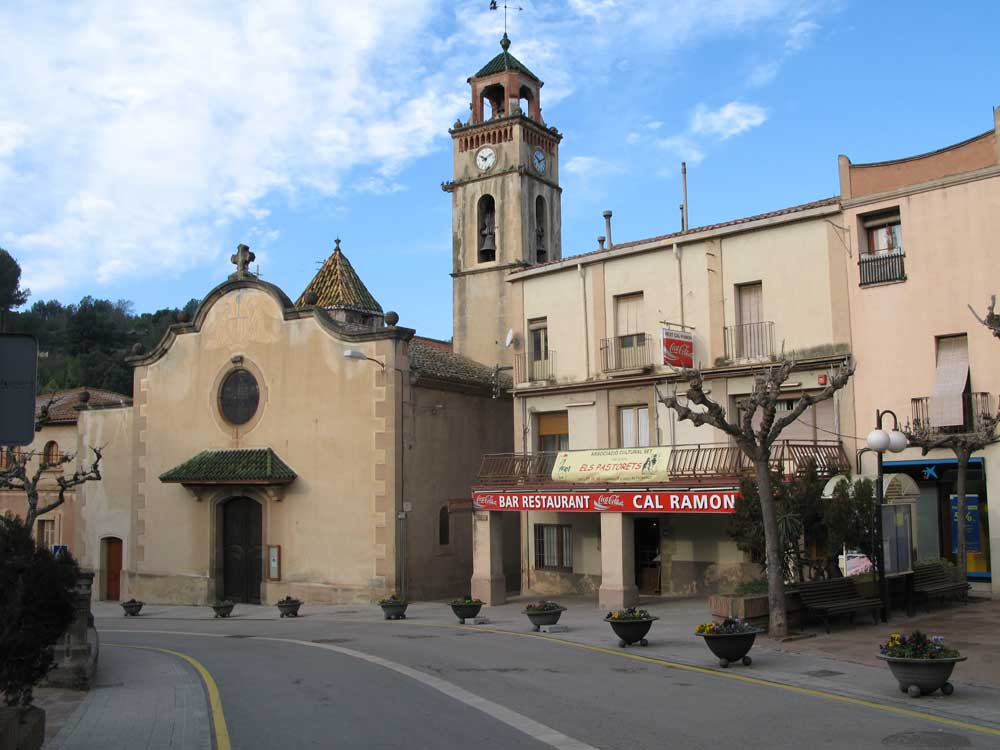
- Square in Sant Llorenç Savall

- Coat of arms

- Location in Catalonia Sant Llorenç Savall (Spain)
- Coordinates: 41°40′46″N 2°03′28″E
- Country: Spain
- Community: Catalonia
- Province: Barcelona
- Comarca: Vallès Occidental

Government
  - Mayor: Joan Solà Herms (2019) (ERC)

Area
  - Total: 41.1 km^{2} (15.9 sq mi)

Population (2025-01-01)
  - Total: 2,587
  - Density: 62.9/km^{2} (163/sq mi)
- Website: www.savall.cat

Sant Llorenç Savall (Catalan pronunciation: [ˈsaɲ ʎuˈɾɛns səˈβaʎ]) is a municipality of the comarca of Vallès Occidental, in Catalonia.

== Churches ==
- Sant Jaume de Vallverd
