= El Palà de Torroella =

el Palà de Torroella
- Singular population entity
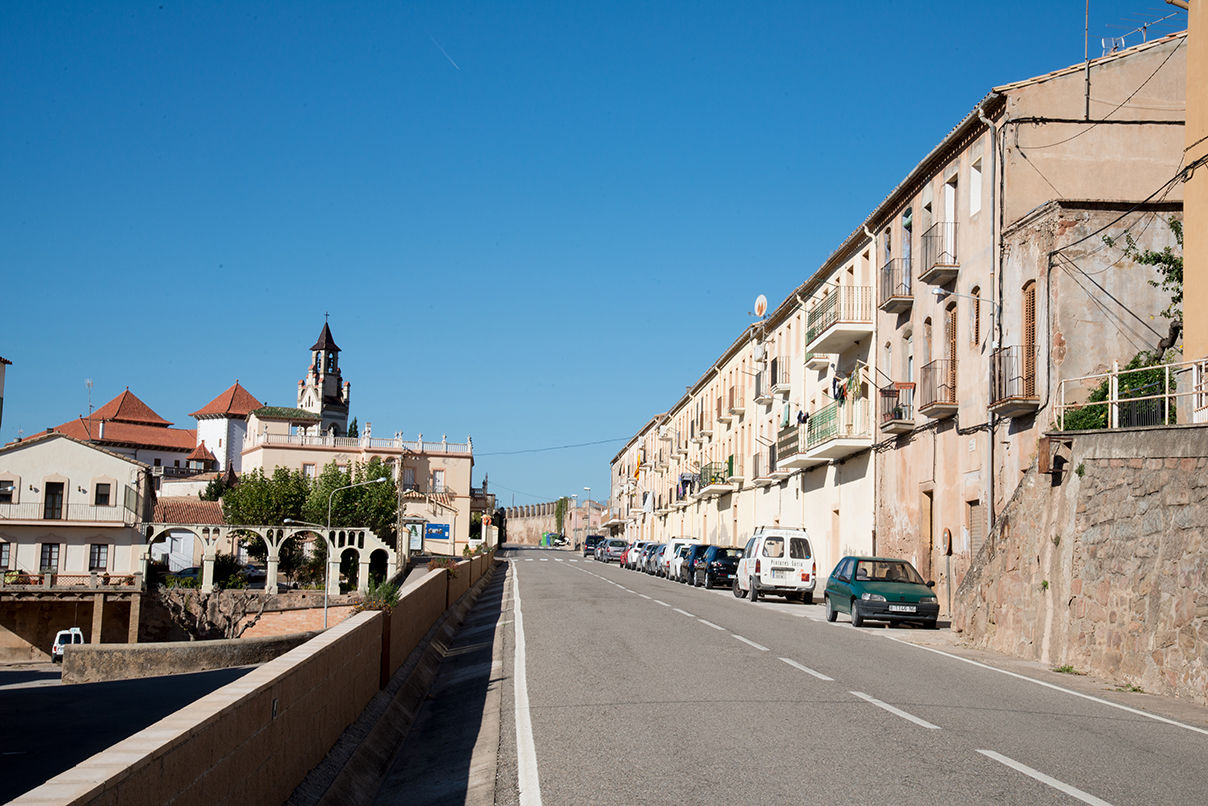
- View of el Palà de Torroella

- Location within Spain Location within Catalonia Location within Province of Barcelona
- Coordinates: 41°51′19.9″N 1°43′02.3″E
- Country: Spain
- A. community: Catalunya
- Province: Barcelona
- Municipality: Navàs

Population (January 1, 2024)
  - Total: 203
- Time zone: UTC+01:00
- Postal code: 08269
- MCN: 08141000400
- Website: Official website

el Palà de Torroella is a singular population entity in the municipality of Navàs, in Catalonia, Spain.

As of 2024 it has a population of 203 people.
