= Atto (bishop of Vic) =

Atto (Catalan: Ató; died 971) was the bishop of Vic from 957 until his death. He had the bishopric of Vic raised to an archbishopric, but was assassinated by his opponents in 971.
