= Arnulf (bishop of Vic) =

Arnulf (died 1010) was the bishop of Vic from 993. He was a member of the family of the hereditary viscounts of Ausona, whose chief castle was at Cardona, although they also controlled the upper town of Vic itself. His mother was the viscountess Ermetruit, who made a donation to the diocese while her son was bishop.

In 985, before he became bishop, Arnulf was captured during a raid by Almanzor and held for ransom in Córdoba. After his release, he was elected to replace Froia, who was murdered by the supporters of an anti-bishop in 992.

Arnulf's younger brother, the viscount of Ausona, recognised the overlordship of the bishop in the upper town. In the mid-eleventh century, the viscount's authority in the upper town was replaced by that of the seneschal of the count of Barcelona when the latter inherited Ausona. The lack of jurisdictional clarity that began in Arnulf's time led to open warfare between the bishops and the seneschals in the thirteenth century.

In 1010, Count Ramon Borrell of Barcelona, taking advantage of the Andalusian fitna (civil war), invaded the caliphate of Córdoba. Arnulf took part in the expedition and was killed in battle.
