= La Coromina =

la Coromina
- Singular population entity
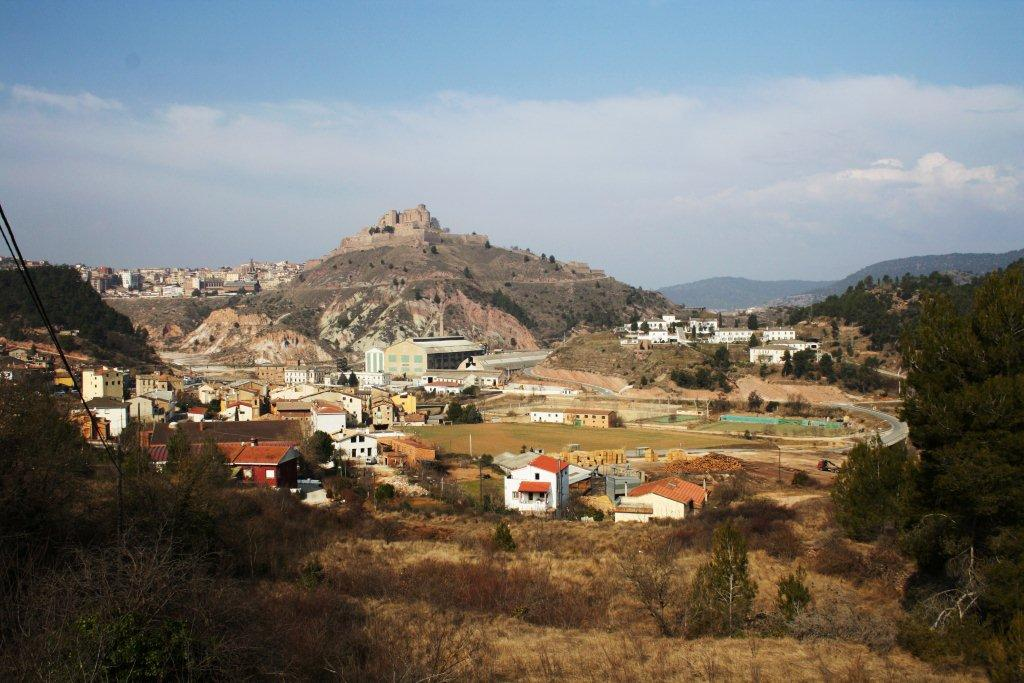
- View of la Coromina

- Location within Spain Location within Catalonia Location within Province of Barcelona
- Coordinates: 41°54′32.5″N 1°41′44.5″E
- Country: Spain
- A. community: Catalunya
- Province: Barcelona
- Municipality: Cardona

Population (January 1, 2024)
  - Total: 540
- Time zone: UTC+01:00
- Postal code: 08261
- MCN: 08047000300

la Coromina is a singular population entity in the municipality of Cardona, in Catalonia, Spain.

As of 2024 it has a population of 540 people.
