= Pinós =

- Municipality
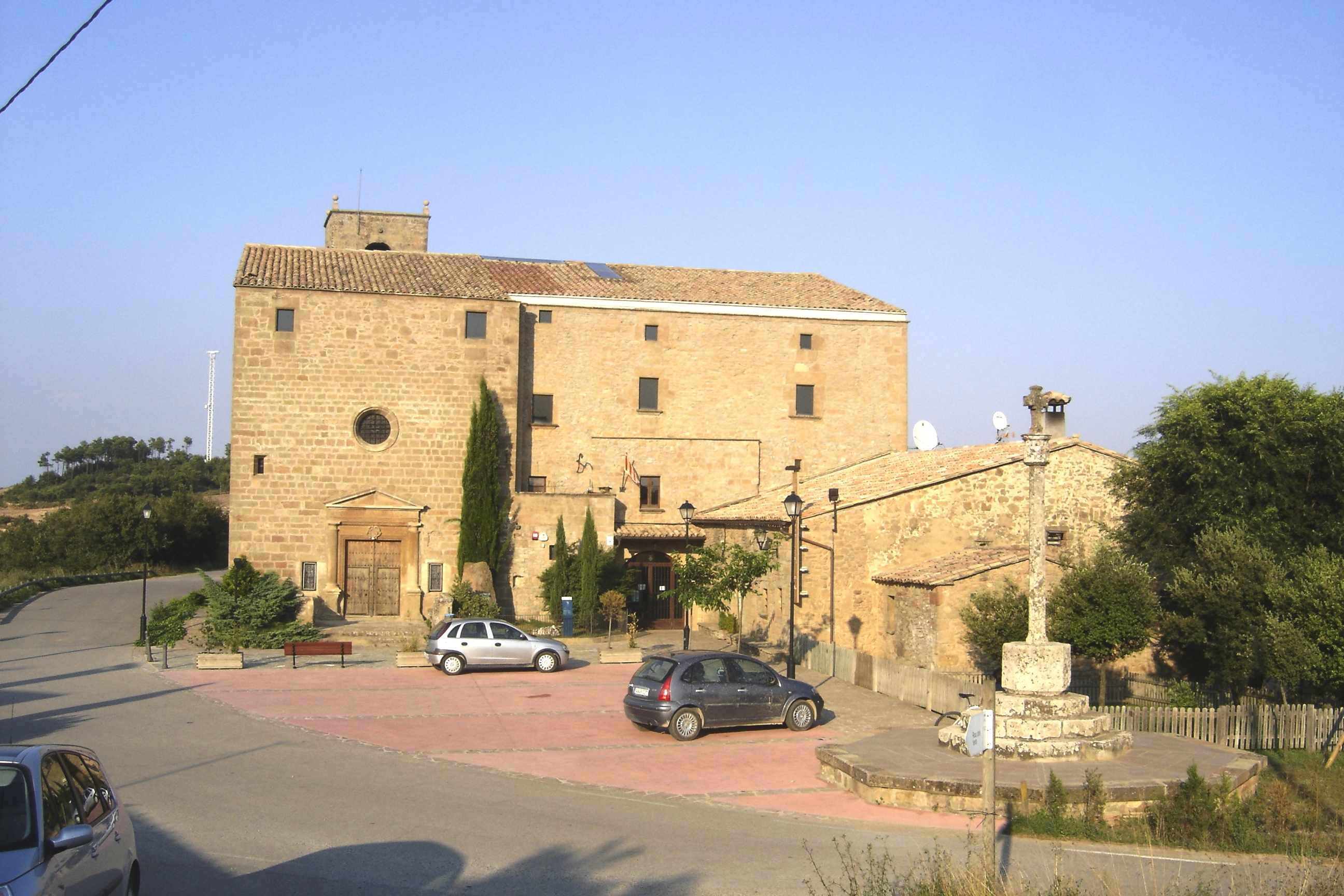
- Pinós's town hall

- Flag Coat of arms

- Location in Catalonia
- Coordinates: 41°49′43″N 1°32′35″E
- Country: Spain
- Community: Catalonia
- Province: Lleida
- Comarca: Solsonès

Government
  - Mayor: Jordi Casellas Palà (2015)

Area
  - Total: 104.3 km^{2} (40.3 sq mi)
- Elevation: 823 m (2,700 ft)

Population (2025-01-01)
  - Total: 274
  - Density: 2.63/km^{2} (6.80/sq mi)
- Demonym(s): Pinosenc, pinosenca
- Postal code: 25287
- Website: pinos.ddl.net

Pinós (Catalan pronunciation: [piˈnos]) is a village and municipality in the province of Lleida and autonomous community of Catalonia, Spain. The municipality includes a small exclave to the north-east, Malagarriga (1.05 km^{2}), in the Cardener valley between the municipalities of Cardona and Navàs in Bages. The village is regarded as the geographical centre of Catalonia, and there is a plaque set in the ground at its claimed location.

It has a population of 274 (register office, 2025).

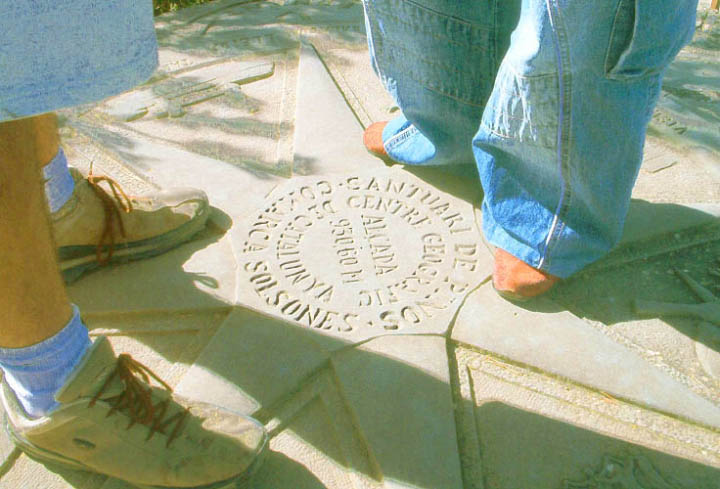
The plaque in Pinós marking the centre of Catalonia
