= Castle of Rajadell =

Medieval castle in Catalonia, Spain

Coordinates: 41.7286°N 1.7060°E

Castell de Rajadell
- Rajadell, Bages, Catalonia, Spain
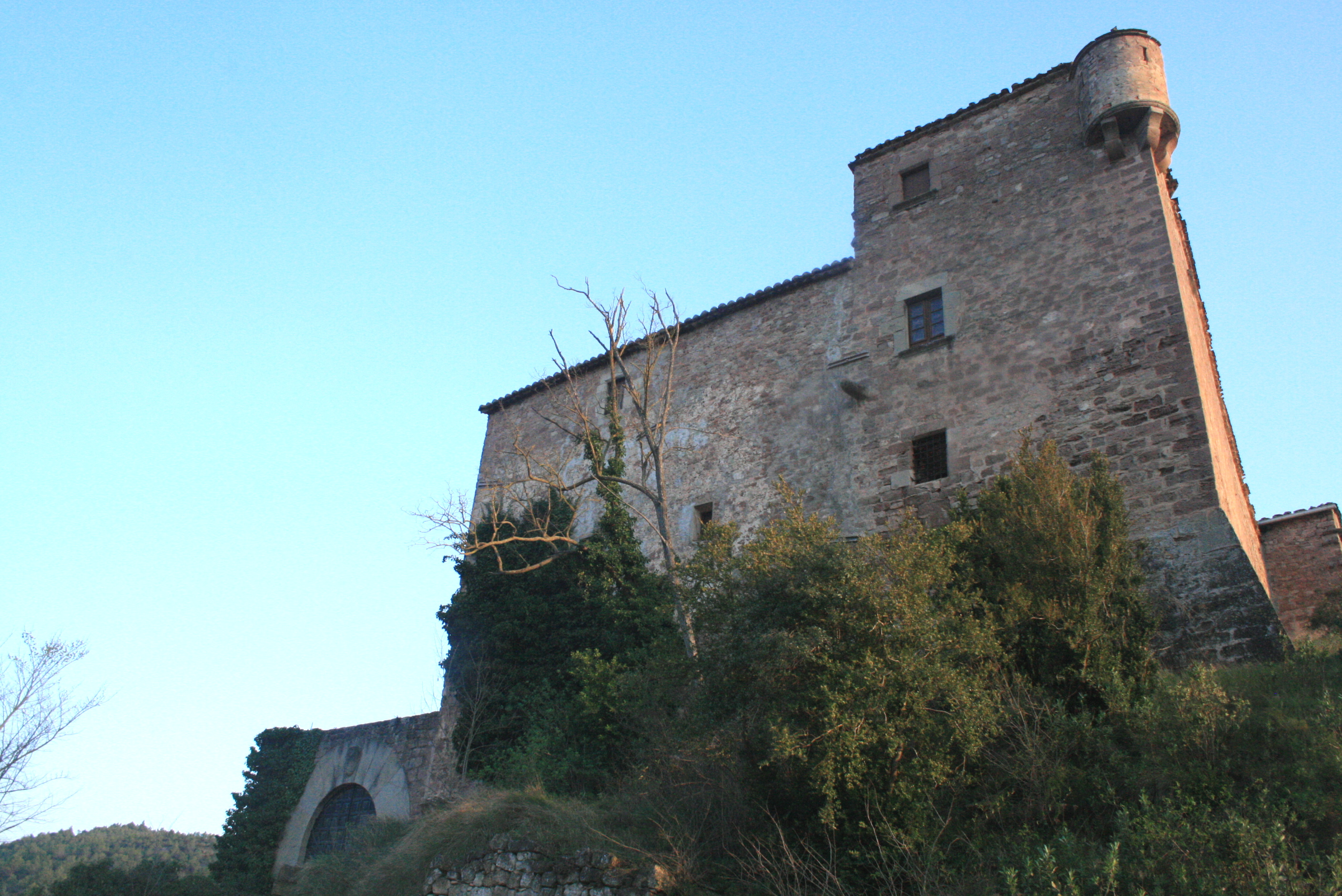

Site information
- Type: Castle

Site history
- Built: 961

The Castle of Rajadell (Catalan: Castell de Rajadell) is a medieval castle in Rajadell, Catalonia, Spain. Built in the 10th century, the castle was used during a number of conflicts in the history of Spain. The castle is listed as a Spanish heritage and cultural site.

== Description ==
The gothic castle was built in the medieval Principality of Catalonia. The castle is first mentioned in 961 A.D, though some sources describe it as a being first mentioned in 1063. The castle was initially built by the noble Rajadell family during the early centuries of the Reconquista. The castle remained in the hands of the Rajadells for centuries, and was badly damaged when the family joined an unsuccessful revolt against John II of Aragon, before being sold in the 16th century.

After the 16th century, the castle was intermittently owned by a number of noble families; by the 19th century it was still in private hands. During the Spanish Civil War, the castle was occupied and used as a base by Catalonian revolutionaries. The Spanish government declared it a heritage site in 1988.
