= Valls de Torroella =

- Singular population entity
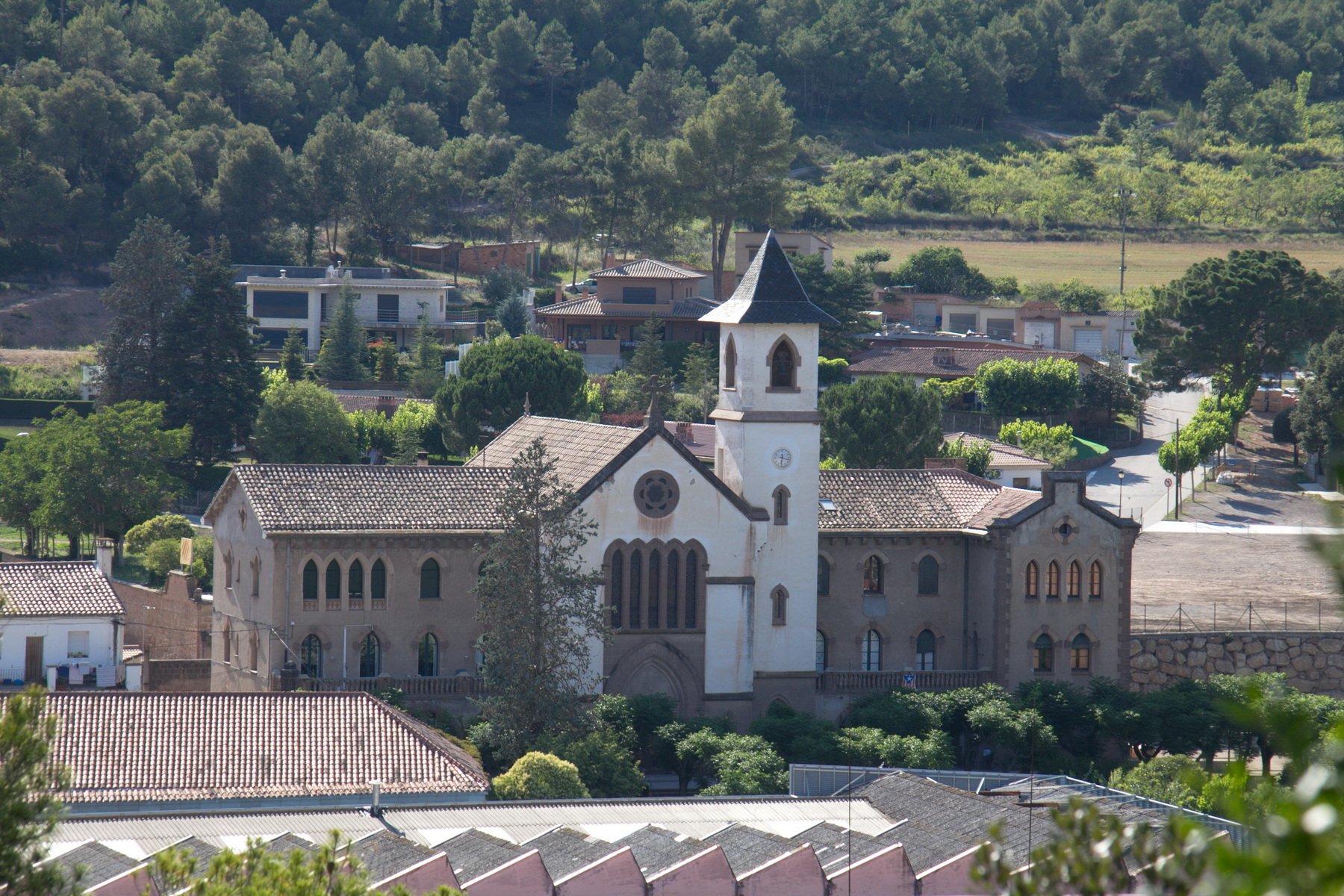
- View of Valls de Torroella

- Location within Spain Location within Catalonia Location within Province of Barcelona
- Coordinates: 41°50′55.5″N 1°43′19.0″E
- Country: Spain
- A. community: Catalunya
- Province: Barcelona
- Municipality: Sant Mateu de Bages

Population (January 1, 2024)
  - Total: 318
- Time zone: UTC+01:00
- Postal code: 08269
- MCN: 08229000500

Valls de Torroella is a singular population entity in the municipality of Sant Mateu de Bages, in Catalonia, Spain.

As of 2024 it has a population of 318 people.
