= El Serrat de Castellnou =

el Serrat de Castellnou
- Singular population entity
- Location within Spain Location within Catalonia Location within Province of Barcelona
- Coordinates: 41°48′11.4″N 1°50′05.1″E
- Country: Spain
- A. community: Catalunya
- Province: Barcelona
- Municipality: Castellnou de Bages

Population (January 1, 2024)
  - Total: 884
- Time zone: UTC+01:00
- Postal code: 08251
- MCN: 08062000500

el Serrat de Castellnou is a singular population entity in the municipality of Castellnou de Bages, in Catalonia, Spain.

As of 2024 it has a population of 884 people.
