= Castelltallat =

- Singular population entity
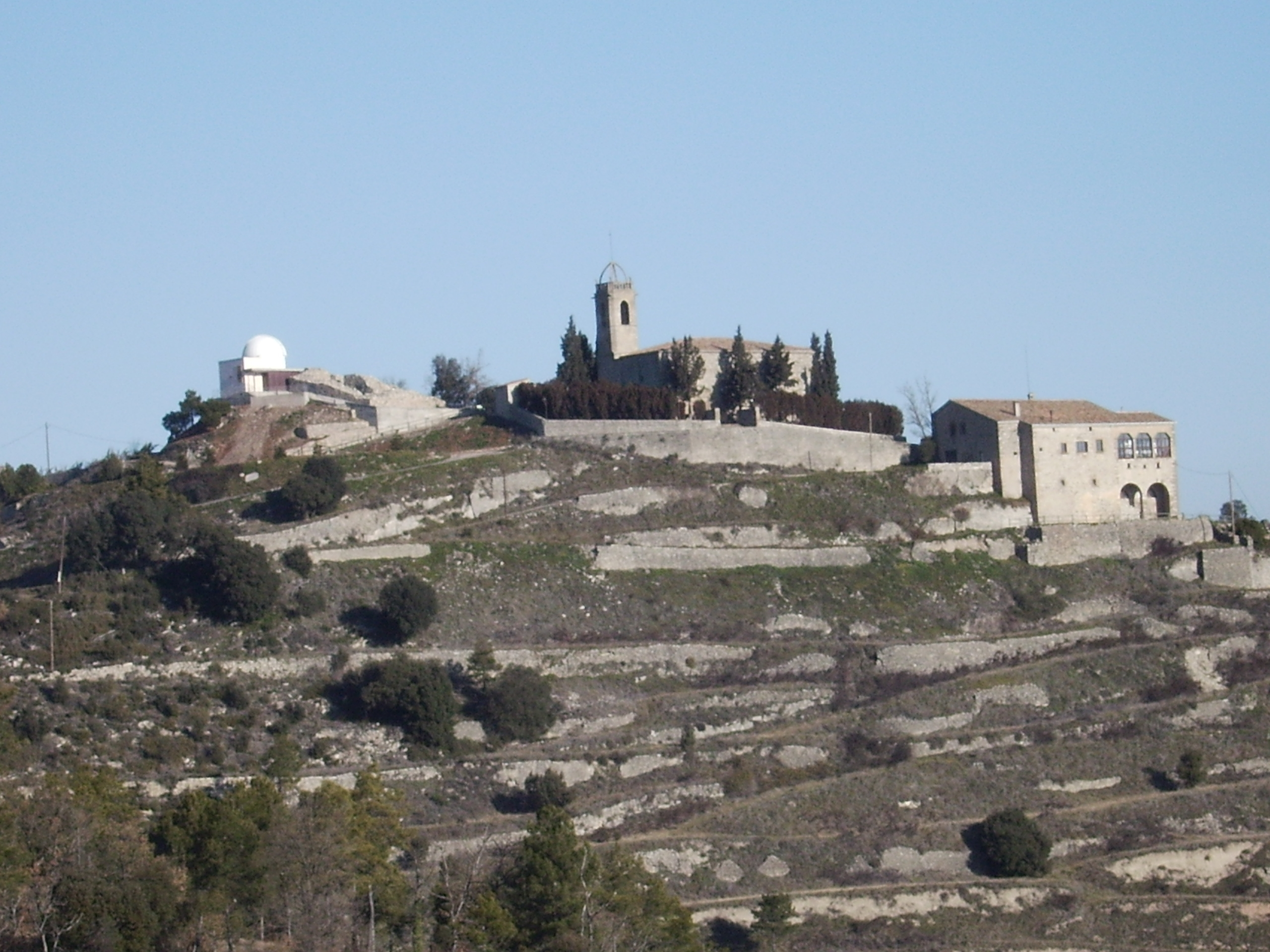
- View of Castelltallat

- Location within Spain Location within Catalonia Location within Province of Barcelona
- Coordinates: 41°47′38.2″N 1°37′57.3″E
- Country: Spain
- A. community: Catalunya
- Province: Barcelona
- Municipality: Sant Mateu de Bages

Population (January 1, 2024)
  - Total: 89
- Time zone: UTC+01:00
- Postal code: 08263
- MCN: 08229000100

Castelltallat is a singular population entity in the municipality of Sant Mateu de Bages, in Catalonia, Spain, in 71 kilometers from Barcelona.

As of 2024 it has a population of 89 people (183 in 1857).

The village was a municipality until 1840 when it became part of San Mateu de Bages municipality. The parish church of Sant Miquel has been documented since 1031 and is located at an altitude of 887 m. The Church contains samples of Romanesque, Renaissance, Baroque and neoclassical architectural styles. It was built at the feet of the now ruined 10th or 11th century Castelltallat castle which gave its name to the mountain range, for "Castell talaiat" comes from the words "Castell", castle, and "Talaia", watchtower.

An astronomical observatory was built close to the ruins of the ancient castle as part of the revitalization of the area after numerous forest fires. Opened in 2004, the dome of the observatory has a diameter of 5 meters and contains a 400 mm telescope.

== Sources ==
- Aine, M. Bescherelle (1857). "Castelltallat". Grand dictionnaire de géographie universelle (in French). Vol. 2 C-F. Administration générale. p. 112.
