= Can Servitge =

- Singular population entity
- Location within Spain Location within Catalonia Location within Province of Barcelona
- Coordinates: 41°42′51.1″N 1°45′46.3″E
- Country: Spain
- A. community: Catalunya
- Province: Barcelona
- Municipality: Rajadell

Population (January 1, 2024)
  - Total: 127
- Time zone: UTC+01:00
- Postal code: 08256
- MCN: 08178000500

Can Servitge is a singular population entity in the municipality of Rajadell, in Catalonia, Spain.

As of 2024 it has a population of 127 people.
