= Canet de Fals =

- Singular population entity
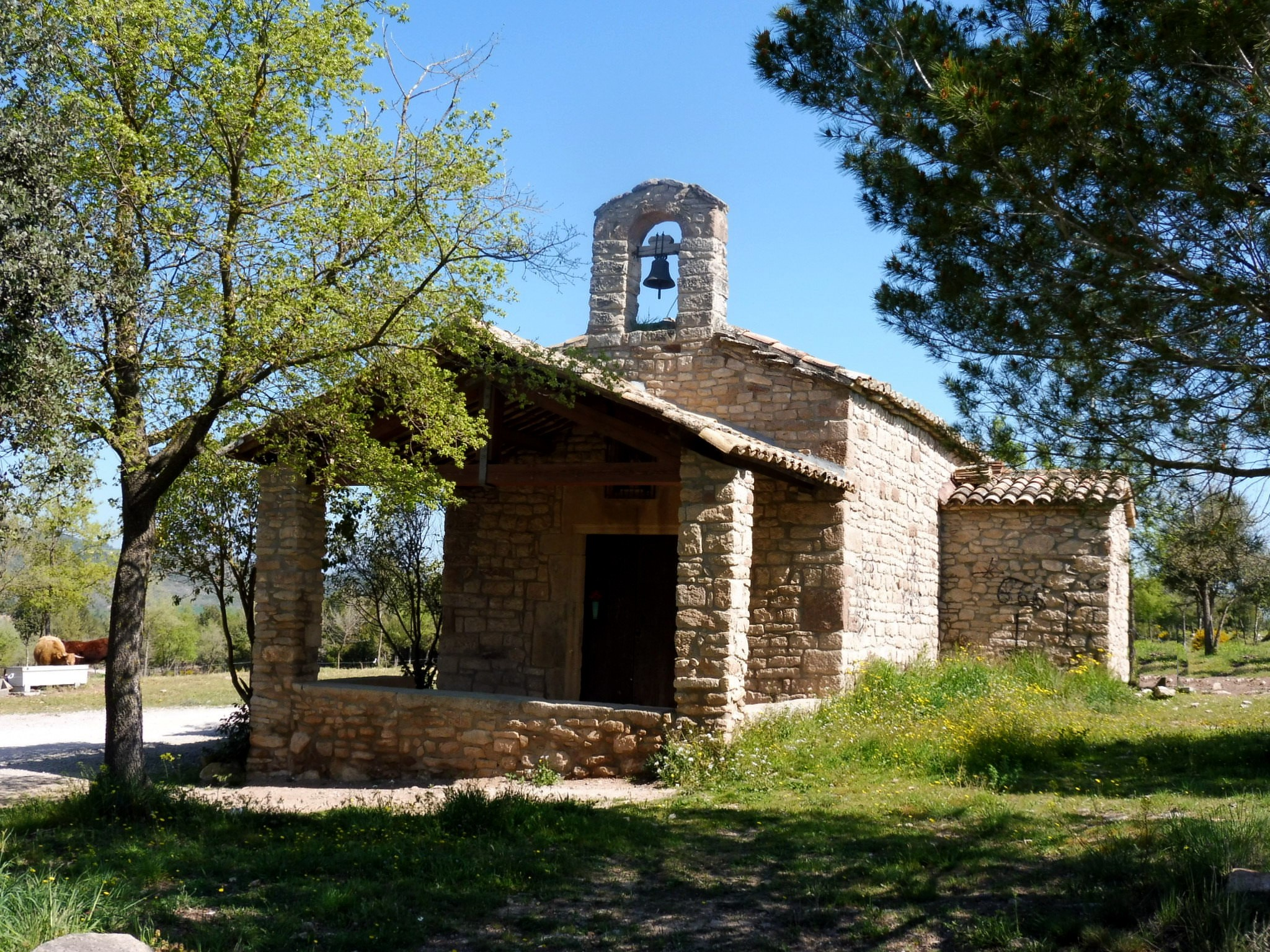
- Sant Joan de Jaumandreu

- Location within Spain Location within Catalonia Location within Province of Barcelona
- Coordinates: 41°45′44.6″N 1°44′36.6″E
- Country: Spain
- A. community: Catalunya
- Province: Barcelona
- Municipality: Fonollosa

Population (January 1, 2024)
  - Total: 914
- Time zone: UTC+01:00
- Postal code: 08259
- MCN: 08084000400

Canet de Fals is a singular population entity in the municipality of Fonollosa, in Catalonia, Spain.

As of 2024 it has a population of 914 people.
