= Les Coromines =

les Coromines
- Singular population entity
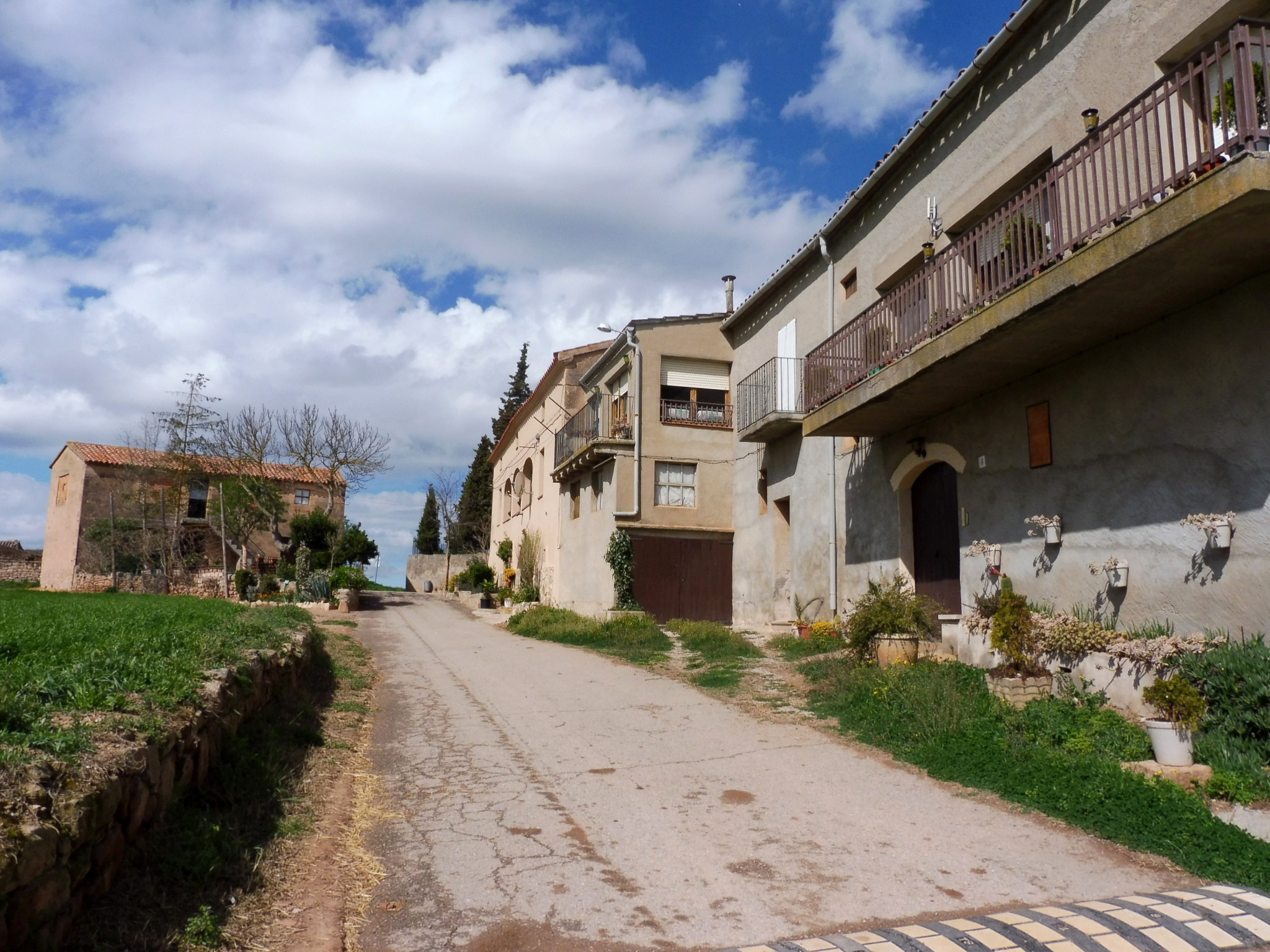
- View of les Coromines

- Location within Spain Location within Catalonia Location within Province of Barcelona
- Coordinates: 41°43′08.8″N 1°34′43.2″E
- Country: Spain
- A. community: Catalunya
- Province: Barcelona
- Municipality: Aguilar de Segarra

Population (January 1, 2024)
  - Total: 26
- Time zone: UTC+01:00
- Postal code: 08281
- MCN: 08002000300

les Coromines is a singular population entity in the municipality of Aguilar de Segarra, in Catalonia, Spain.

As of 2024 it has a population of 26 people.
