= Coaner =

- Singular population entity
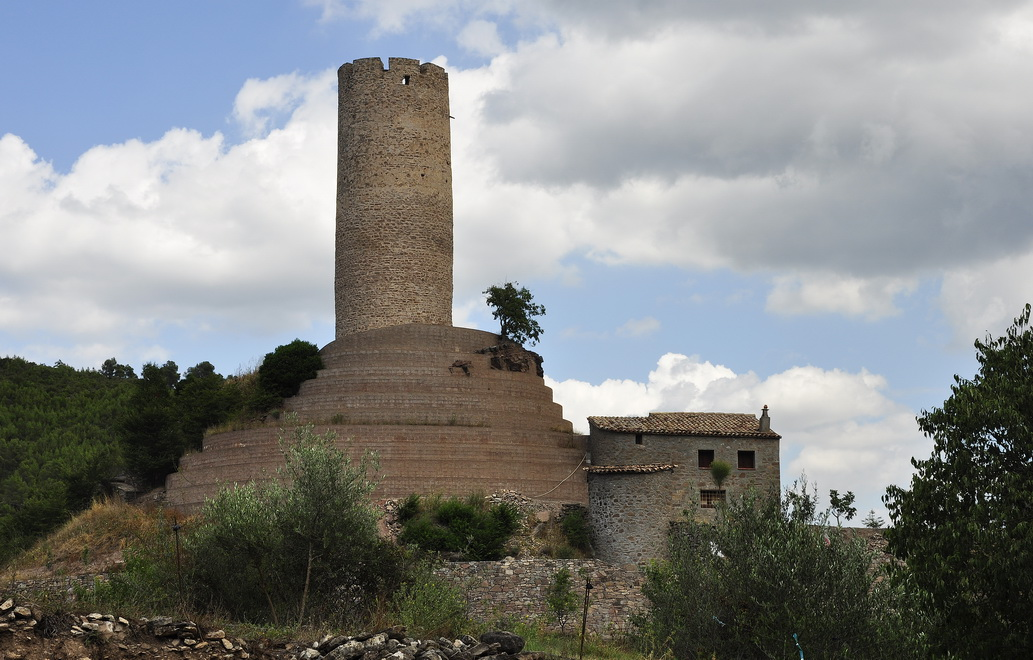
- Castle of Coaner

- Location within Spain Location within Catalonia Location within Province of Barcelona
- Coordinates: 41°49′57.6″N 1°42′47.6″E
- Country: Spain
- A. community: Catalunya
- Province: Barcelona
- Municipality: Sant Mateu de Bages

Population (January 1, 2024)
  - Total: 19
- Time zone: UTC+01:00
- Postal code: 08269
- MCN: 08229000200

Coaner is a singular population entity in the municipality of Sant Mateu de Bages, in Catalonia, Spain.

As of 2024 it has a population of 19 people.
