= Argençola, Castellnou de Bages =

Argençola
- Singular population entity
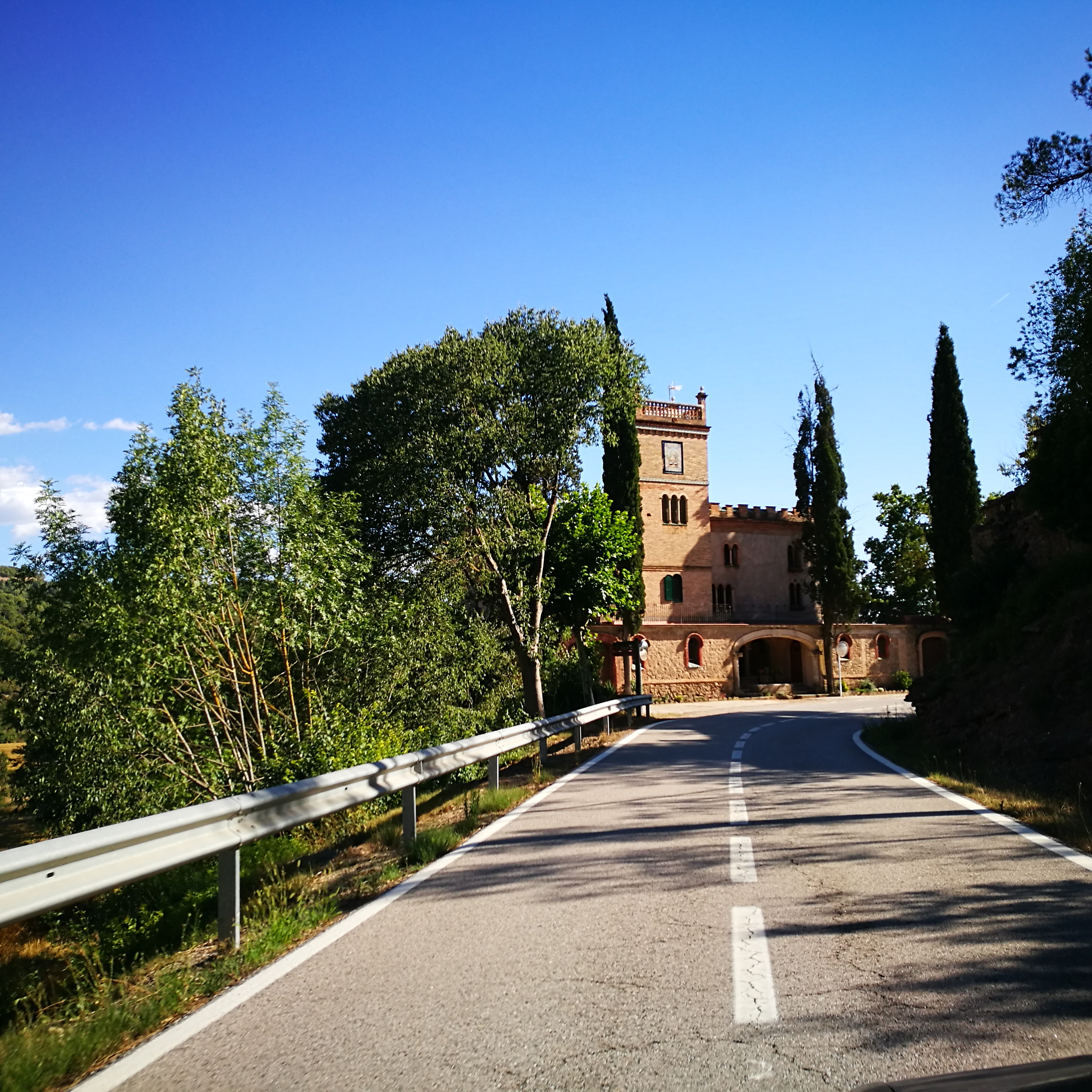
- Arriving to Argençola

- Location within Spain Location within Catalonia Location within Province of Barcelona
- Coordinates: 41°51′34.4″N 1°47′35.0″E
- Country: Spain
- A. community: Catalunya
- Province: Barcelona
- Municipality: Castellnou de Bages

Population (January 1, 2024)
  - Total: 15
- Time zone: UTC+01:00
- Postal code: 08260
- MCN: 08062000200
- Website: Official website

Argençola is a singular population entity in the municipality of Castellnou de Bages, in Catalonia, Spain.

As of 2024, it has a population of 15 people.
