= El Fusteret =

Fusteret
- Singular population entity
- Location within Spain Location within Catalonia Location within Province of Barcelona
- Coordinates: 41°49′12.0″N 1°45′36.0″E
- Country: Spain
- A. community: Catalunya
- Province: Barcelona
- Municipality: Súria

Population (January 1, 2024)
  - Total: 59
- Time zone: UTC+01:00
- Postal code: 08260
- MCN: 08274000200

Fusteret is a singular population entity in the municipality of Súria, in Catalonia, Spain.

As of 2024 it has a population of 59 people.
