= Museo Memoria de la Ciudad =

Museum in Asunción, Paraguay

The Museum of the Memory of the City
- (Museo Memoria de la Ciudad)
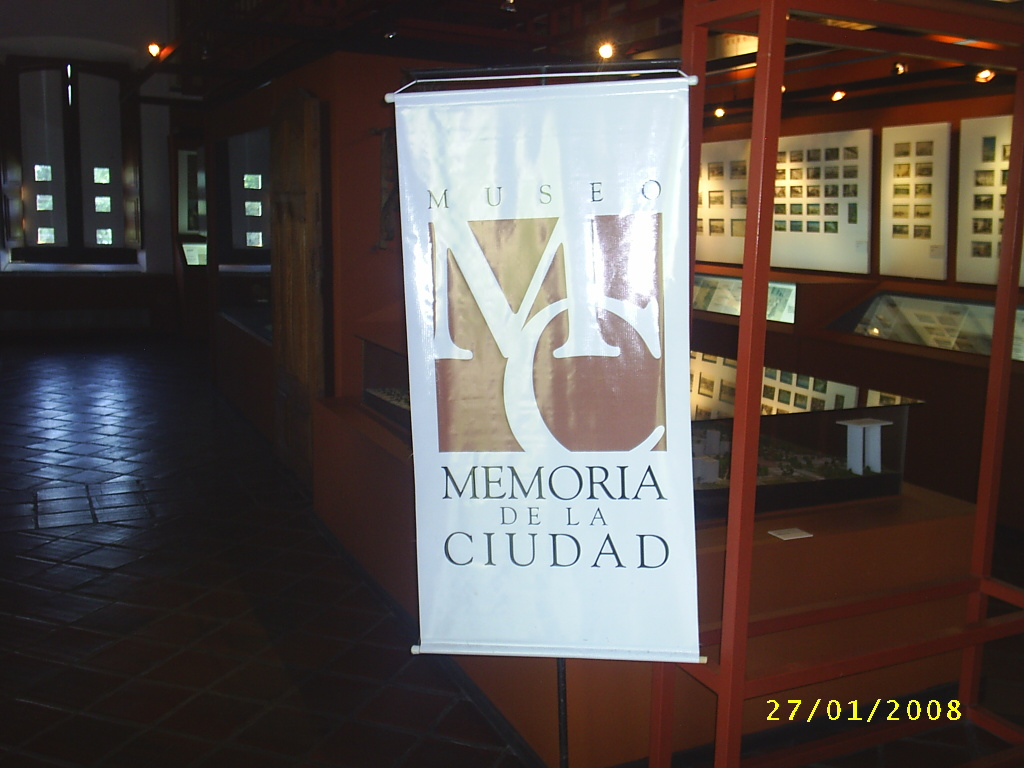
- Museo Memoria de la Ciudad
- Location: Viola House (Casa Viola), one of the nine buildings that make up the architectonic complex Manzana de la Rivera, in front the Government house, in Asunción, capital of Paraguay
- Coordinates: 25.2782°S 57.6375°W

The Museum of the Memory of the City (Museo Memoria de la Ciudad) is located in the Viola House (Casa Viola), one of the nine buildings that make up the architectonic complex Manzana de la Rivera, in front the Government house, in Asunción, capital of Paraguay. This Museum was an idea of the architect Carlos Colombino, and was inaugurated on 14 August 1996. a journey through its different spaces will allow to make a reading of Asuncion's history, in its different phases of development. The objects that it treasures had been collected in the country, as well as in the cities of New York City, Madrid, Paris, Montevideo and Buenos Aires.

== CASA VIOLA ==
The Viola house is a typical colonial construction dated from 1750 to 1758, its location answers to the disposition of the streets before doctor Gaspar Rodríguez de Francia squared the city. The house has a tile roof. There is a gallery in front; behind the gallery there is a blacksmith's shop built over wooden beams and columns. Previously, the house had three big rooms, now there's only one, located in front of the government. In the back part there is a passing gallery, as a sample of the culata yovai, type of antique Paraguayan houses. The roof is made of palm and tacuara; the tiles are set with a mud kind of cement.

== History ==
Alter the change of government in 1989, people wanted to restore few places in town. In this context, a group of architecture students Start the campaign "Salvemos la Manzana frente al palacio" which means "let’s save the block in front of the government palace", due to the damage of the construction and in opposition to a project that pretend to demolish to build a park in its place. Due to the celebration of the 500 years of America's discovery, there were established through all Iberoamerica some commissions to organize few actions about it. The Comisión V Centenario Paraguay, presided by the architect Juan Cristaldo, includes the Project Casa Viola, among the principal projects to be done, which was presented by the writer Augusto Roa Bastos in front of the Agencia Española de Cooperación Internacional (Spanish agency of international cooperation). During the administration of the mayor José Luis Alder, Asuncion's town hall acquired the property that of in the property of the Manzana. The restoration works started in 1991, year in which the buildings started to function again to turn it into the cultural centre of the city. Its first principal was the architect Carlos Colombino. The visit to this Museum allows a double reading through one of the facts that happened since the foundation of the city, and another one through the chronicles of its protagonists. In the museum we can appreciate different ritual elements appertaining to the guarani culture, as a pre-Hispanic undertaker's. there's also a genealogical tree of enlightened men and women of the nation, paintings by many Paraguayan artists, that reflect the way of living in Asunción through the different periods, geographical maps, statistics and historical information, city maps of Asunción and the neighbor countries, from the 17th and 18th centuries, furnitures, journals, books, shields, magazines, scores, candlesticks, colonial objects, as various building elements. In the year 2005, with the sponsoring of the United States embassy, the conservation and restoration Project of the heap started.

== More significant samples ==
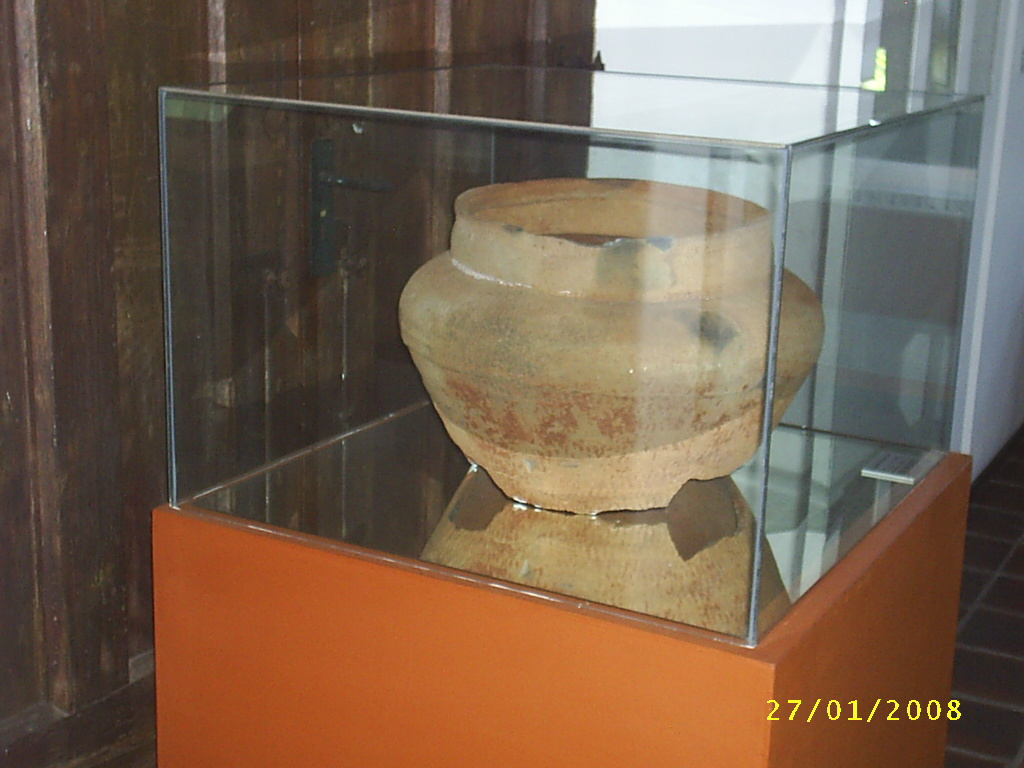
Guaraní funeral urn

ARCHEOLOGY

The native guaraníes developed a prolific agro pottery activity. For the fabrication of objects they used a pottery decorated with fingers and natural dyeing. In the museum you can appreciate an urn, used to bury their dead people.

ARCHITECTURE

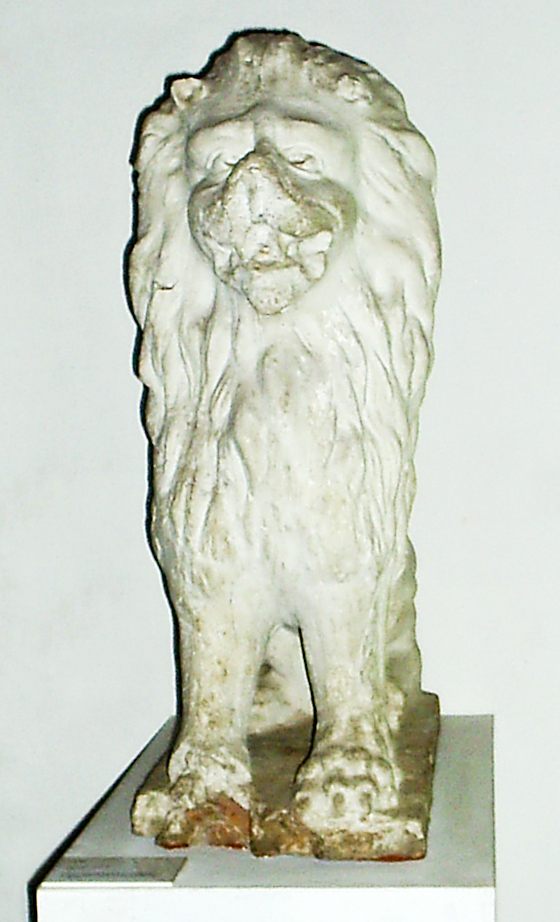
Concrete Lion

Concrete Lion

The lion is a very appreciated animal, especially in the European heraldry, it was used as a decorative element in Asuncion's architecture. A concrete lion is appreciated in the museum.

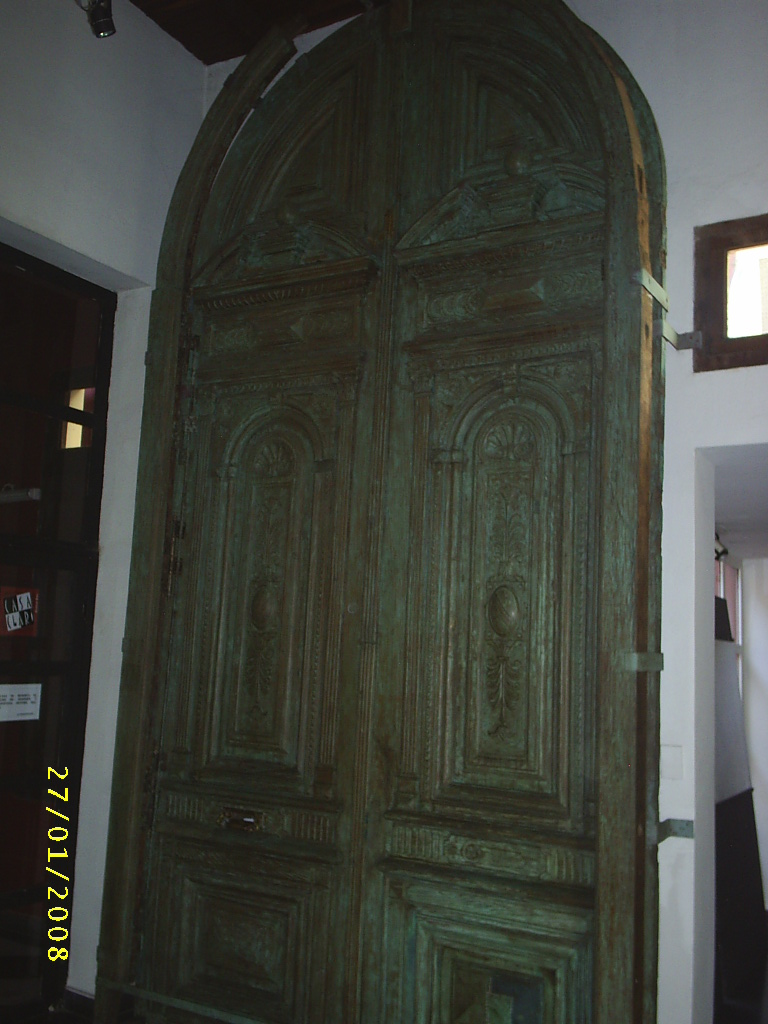
Door of the Nacional Club. 1860

Door of the National Club

A carved and assembled door belonged to the National Club, founded by Carlos Antonio López’ sons and sons in law. The building to which it belonged was designed by the architect Alejandro Ravizza, being finished in 1860, located in the corner of Palma street, between 25 de diciembre (today named Chile) and Atajo (today named Alberdi).

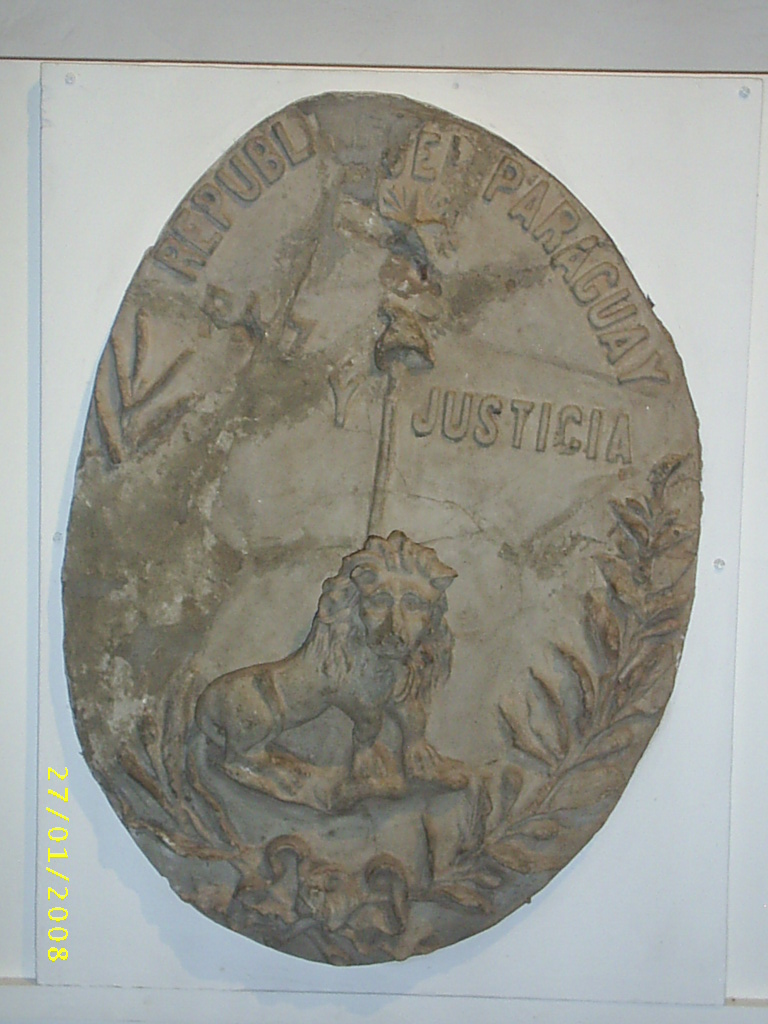
Shield of Paraguay

Concrete Shield of Paraguay

Ornamental constructive element exponent of Paraguayan culture.

Wind proof door with beveled glass with Paraguay's shield.

Paraguay's shield was created by José Gaspar Rodríguez de Francia in 1820. next to Paraguay's shield is the one named "Hacienda" created by the consuls Mariano R. Alonso and Carlos A. López in the Extraordinary Congress, 25 November 1842.

Colonial drew tiles from the Castelvi House.

The constructive elements of Paraguayan architecture are a result of different architectonic influences: formals, functional, stylish and constructive.

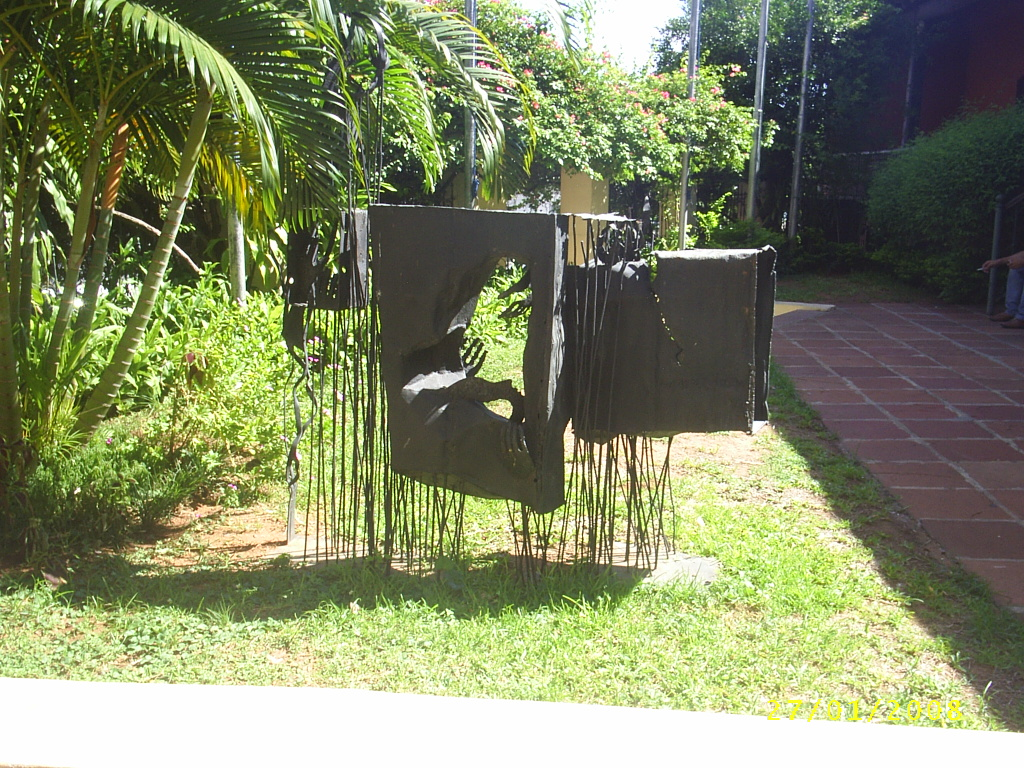
Escultura ubicada a la Entrada de la Manzana de la Rivera

DOCUMENTS

Among the most important documents that the museum has, the maps stand out. The maps are from different periods and establish a reflection of the historic evolution of the region. In a colored map made in Ámsterdam in 1694: Paraguay or Province of the Río La Plata with adjacent can be appreciated the adjacent regions of Tucumán and Santa Cruz de la Sierra. In Paraguay's map, made at the beginnings of the 20th century, you can see the Chaco territory lost after the Guerra del Chaco (Chaco war). In Paraguay's map, vulgo Paraguay, with adjacent, made in the 17th century, you can see Asuncion's street-map.

Doña Ysabel Venegas’ Will

The object shown is a copy of the original Hill of Doña Isabel Venegas, cross-bred and main woman, neighbor of Asunción city, in 1578. The original one is in the National registry of Asunción (Archivo Nacional de Asunción) Juditial and Criminal Section, vol. 1537.

Score

There are many scores of great value for Paraguayan musical history saved in this Museum: Añoranza triste (Sad nostalgia), Canción guarani (Guaraní song), Gratitud (Gratitude) by Carlos Federico Reyes, musician, humorist, writer and painter, born in Asunción, on 15 October 1909. Died in 1999. There are also the original scores of the polka Recuerdos de Caacupé (Caacupé memories).

Asuncion's street rectification by José G. Rodríguez de Francia

Acrylic panel representation: the yellow bands: street's grids (medieval European model established by the Population's ordinance and brought to America by the Spanish people. Asuncion lost like that its last prototypical Paraguayan characteristics). The black bands: map made by Azara.

Asuncion's Coasting Band Project and Urban Environment Development plan

The coasting band Project propose to give solutions to many social, environmental, urban, and technical problems, caused by the spate of Paraguay River (río Paraguay); as to give a new image to that zone of the city.

ART

Paintings

La mestiza, Indígenas chaqueños: by Roberto Holden

El mercado Guasú, Calle Palma by Ignacio Núñez Soler

La Chacarita: by Alicia Bravard

Personajes del Mercado de Asunción: little statues by Serafín Marsal(1861–1951). Born in Spain and arrived to Paraguay in 1907, where he settled definitively.

Maqueta del Centro histórico de Asunción

Asuncion's Historic Centre Model A three-dimensional representation of the city, the historical buildings are in Light brown. The rest of the buildings are in a neutral color.

Pictures of the book Paraguay's Republic

Pictures: Payaguá Chief, House of Government, Asuncion's Market, Cathedral Church, Encarnación Church, Brigadier Gral. Francisco Solano López, Government Park, Asuncion's Nautical and Harbor, Sketch of the first Railway section (Asunción-Villarrica).

Colored Carvings: Arnoldus Montanus . Publisher in Ámsterdam in 1671.

Asuncion's street-map: Félix de Azara (1746–1821). Spanish naturalist and seaman, sent to America to arbitrate in the border situation between Spain's and Portugal's possessions. He studied the fauna and the geography of Paraguay and of the Río de la Plata.

SUITE

First music stand of Asuncion's Symphonic Orchestra.

Rocking-chair: Word and weave. 19th century. Don Carlos Antonio López period.

Colonial Bedroom In this room are shown among other objects, a wedding bed, hammocks for older people and kids, Saint niche, a pitcher, a candlestick, a place were people used to pray their rosaries, while the parents prayed, a kid would be in a smaller sit passing them the mate.

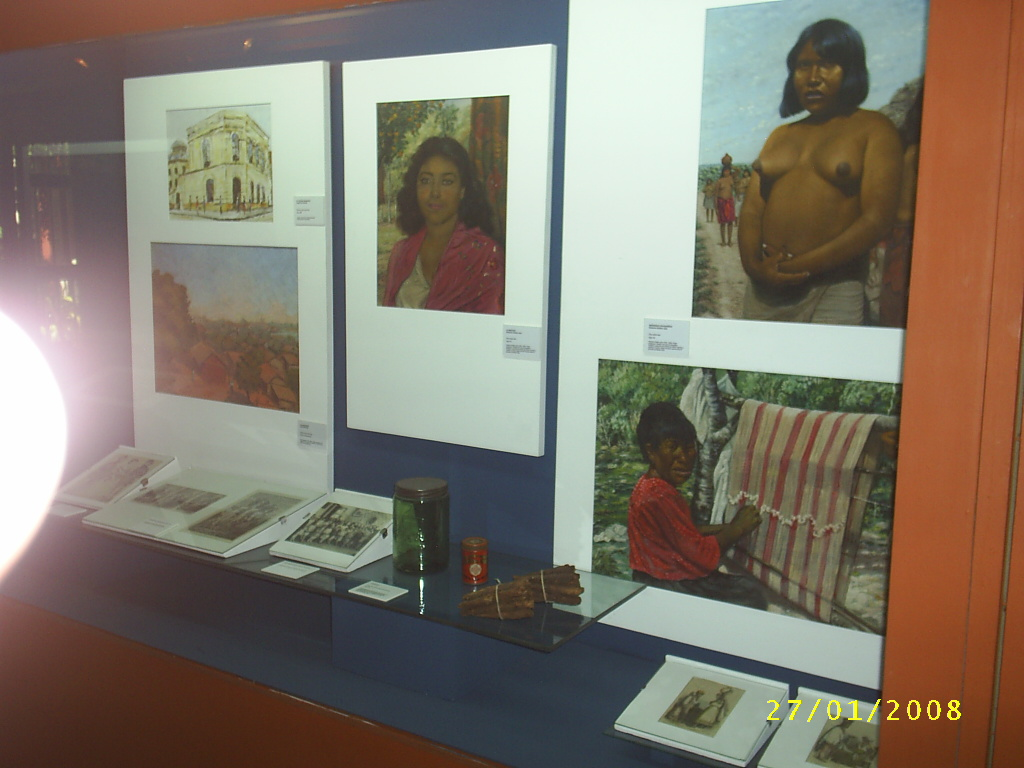
Paintings and various objects

VARIOUS OBJECTS Bandoneón, with its black leather box with floral details and its interior lined with red velveteen.

Guaraní ritual elements, used by the guarani Indians as musical instruments and as water recipients..

Niche belonging to the colonial art, originally Tabapy, made in the first half of the 18th century, painted and carved in a many-colored wood, dedicated to de Rosary Virgin. It belonged to the Isasi-de la Peña family. It was donated to this Museum by Rubén Talavera Goiburú and his wife. Little wooden trunk, formed by a box with a curved lid with two pieces of wood and four screws, polished and lined up with paper in its interior.

Two pieces of tobacco, symbol of the economical growth of the Lopez Time Jars of Yerba from the Asunción Company, commercial representations of the yerba mate, one of the products most widely used by the society

Medal of the 50th anniversary of the Guarania, given to Jose Asunción Flores
