= Gaià =

- Municipality
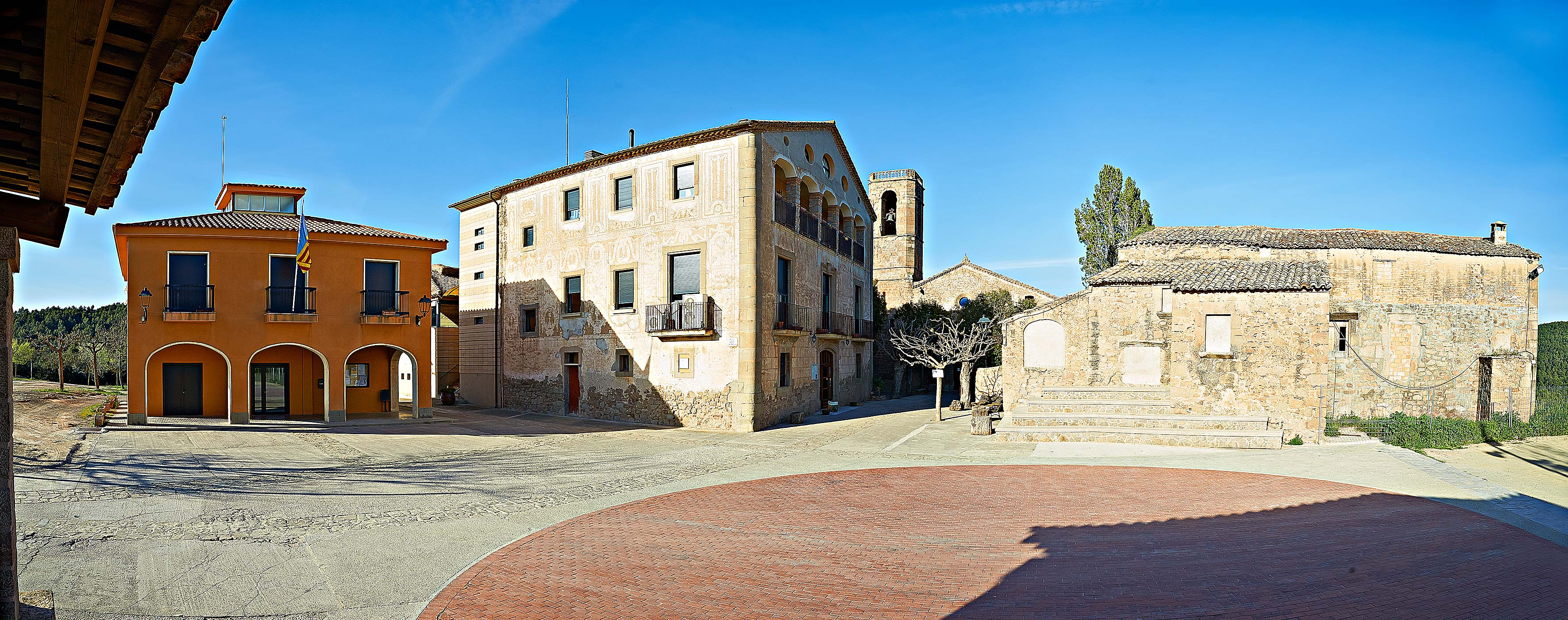
- Gaià town hall

- Flag Coat of arms

- Location in Catalonia Gaià (Spain)
- Coordinates: 41.916°N 1.926°E
- Province: Barcelona
- Comarca: Bages

Government
  - Mayor: Enric Armengou Vall de la Vilaramó (2015)

Area
  - Total: 39.5 km^{2} (15.3 sq mi)

Population (2025-01-01)
  - Total: 172
  - Density: 4.35/km^{2} (11.3/sq mi)
- Website: gaia.cat

Gaià (Catalan pronunciation: [gəˈja]) is a municipality in the province of Barcelona and autonomous community of Catalonia, Spain. The municipality covers an area of 39.6 square kilometres (15.3 sq mi) and the population in 2014 was 163.
