= Súria =

- Municipality
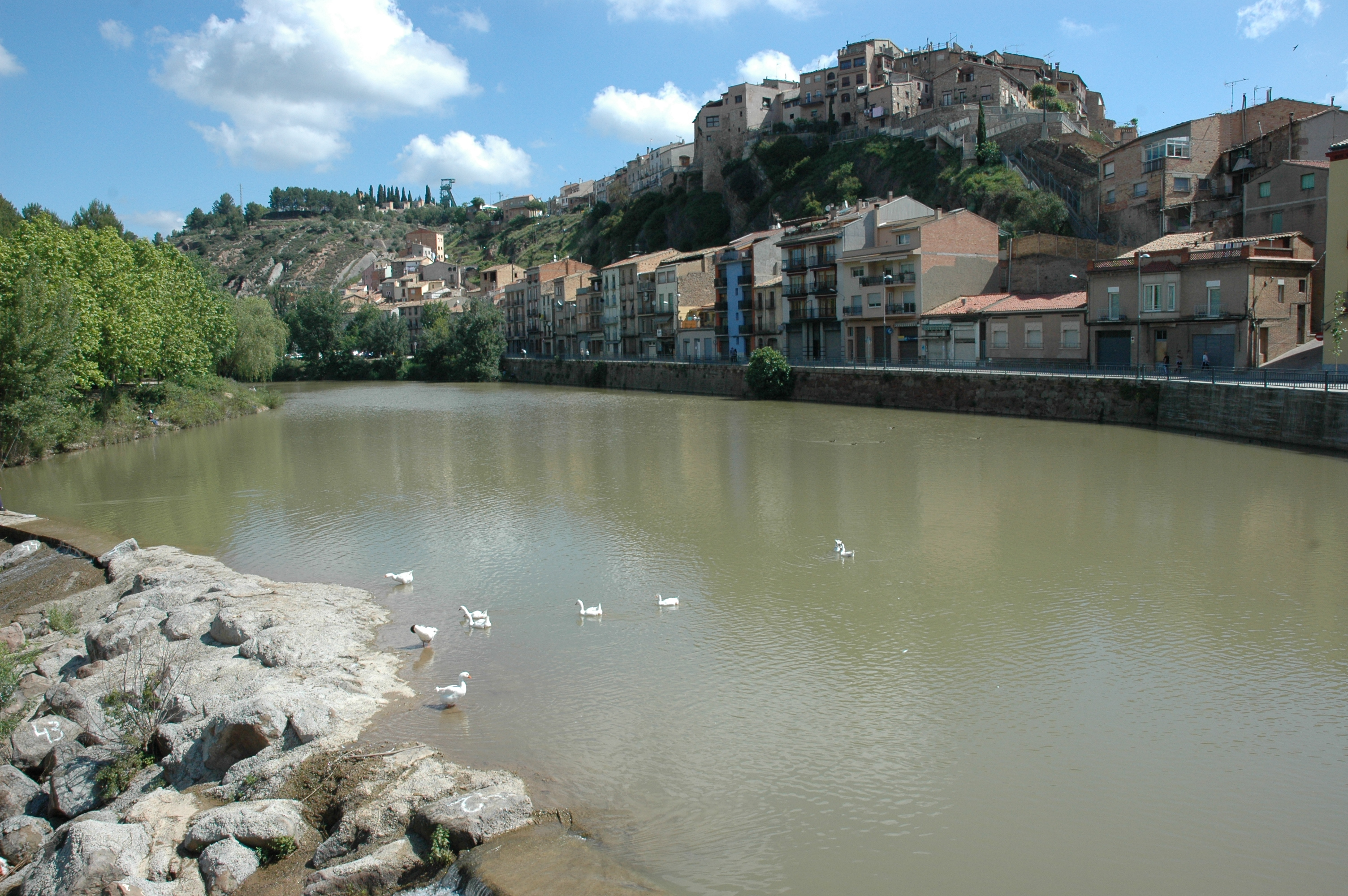
- The Cardener river passing Súria

- Flag Coat of arms

- Location in Catalonia Súria (Spain)
- Coordinates: 41°50′10″N 1°45′10″E
- Country: Spain
- Community: Catalonia
- Province: Barcelona
- Comarca: Bages

Government
  - Mayor: Josep Ma. Canues Costa (2015)

Area
  - Total: 23.6 km^{2} (9.1 sq mi)
- Elevation: 326 m (1,070 ft)

Population (2025-01-01)
  - Total: 6,200
  - Density: 260/km^{2} (680/sq mi)
- Demonym(s): Surienc, surienca
- Website: www.suria.cat

Súria (Catalan pronunciation: [ˈsuɾiə]) is a municipality in the comarca of the Bages in Catalonia. It is situated in the valley of the Cardener river between Manresa and Cardona. The area is best known for its deposits of potassium salts, which are exploited commercially and exported with trucks directly to all around the European continent or served to Martorell to receive chemical treatment by a dedicated railway line (there are passenger rail services between Martorell and Manresa, but there are none between Manresa and Súria, separated only by 14.3 km of distance). The Old Town, at the foot of the castle, has preserved much of its medieval structure. The municipality is linked to Manresa and to Cardona and Solsona by the C-1410 road.

== Demography ==
1900	1930	1950	1970	1986	2016
1,941	3,975	4,378	6,869	6,684	5,999
