= Manzana de la Rivera =

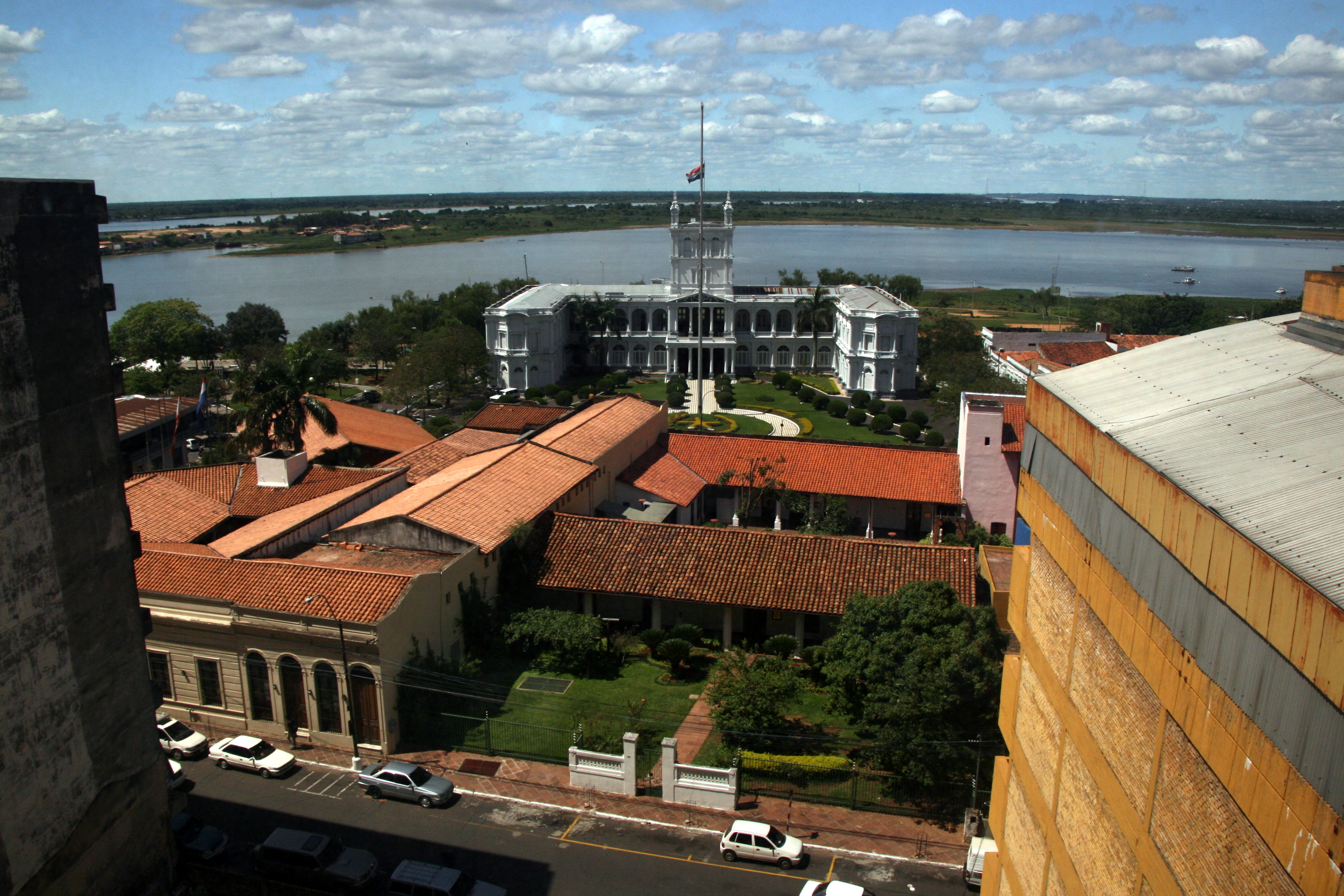
The Manzana de la Rivera Complex, downtown Asunción.

The Manzana de la Rivera is an antique city block transformed into a museum-library-theater-café complex located in Asunción. It has become a cultural symbol of Paraguay.

== Location ==
Located at Juan de Ayolas 129, Asunción, Paraguay, the architectonic complex is a group of nine restored houses as well as some new construction. It is located in front of the Government House. Its name comes from an old nearby street name, the Calle de la Rivera.

== History ==
After the change of government in 1989, people wanted to restore a few places in town. In this context, a group of architecture students started the campaign Salvemos la Manzana frente al palacio which means let’s save the city block in front of the government house, opposing a project that intended to demolish it to build a park in its place. The restoration works started in 1991. Its first director was the architect Carlos Colombino.

== Houses of la Manzana ==
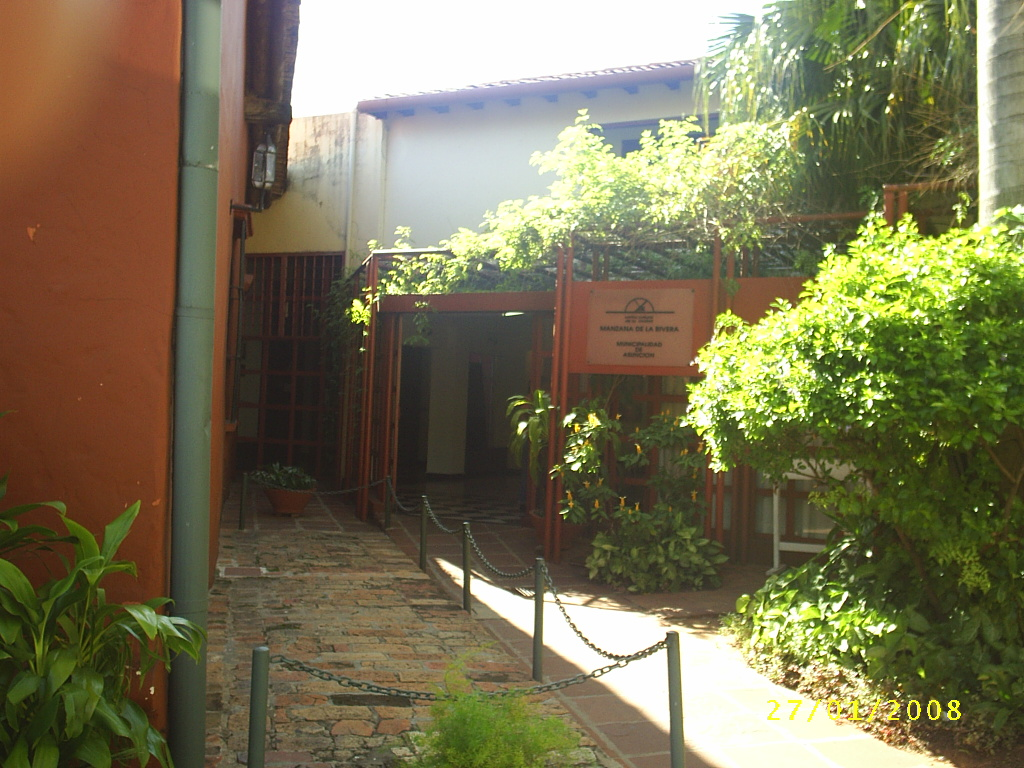
Main entrance of Manzana de la Rivera

Viola House

The Viola House is a typical colonial construction dated from 1750 to 1758. Its location relates to the layout of the streets before Doctor Gaspar Rodríguez de Francia squared the city. The house has a tile roof. There is a gallery in front; behind the gallery there is a blacksmith's shop built over wooden beams and columns. Previously, the house had three big rooms, now there's only one, located in front. In the back part there is a passing gallery, as a sample of the culata yovai, a type of antique Paraguayan house. The roof of the gallery is made of palm and tacuara; the tiles are set with a mud kind of cement.

Nowadays it houses the Museo Memoria de la Ciudad, a museum in commemoration of the city, and exhibits texts, maps, objects, paints, graphics, as well as other elements that tell the history of Asunción, since its foundation until modern times.

Clari House

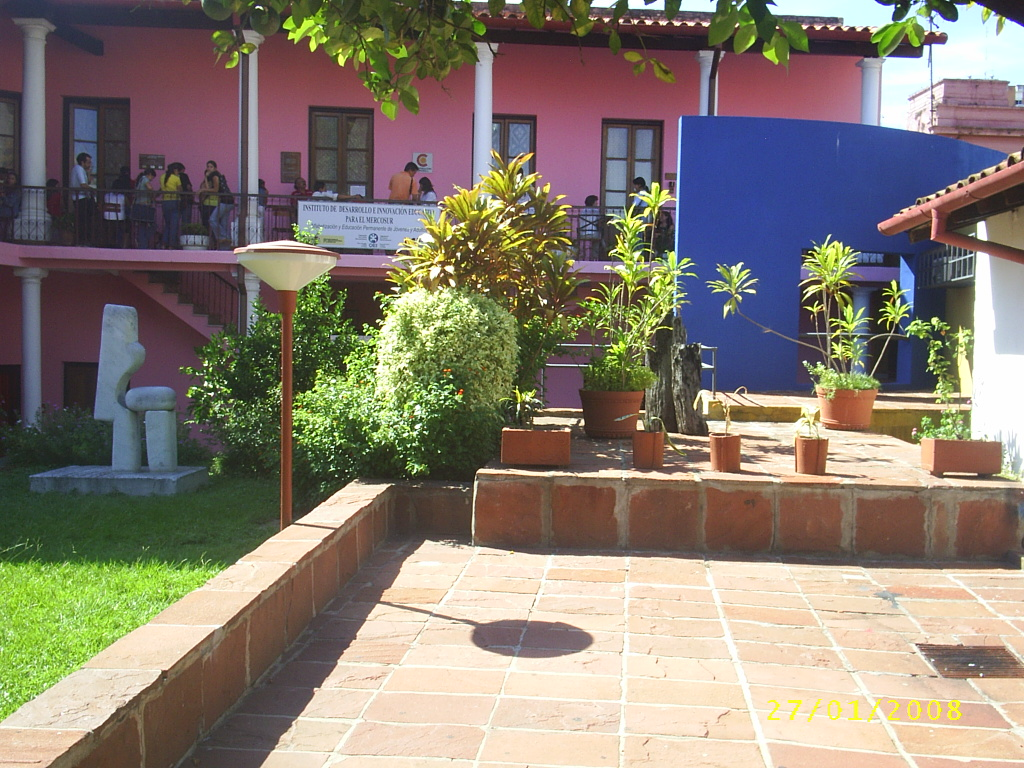
Patio Leonor

Located next to the “Viola House”, this house is a simple construction with an interior gallery with rooms next to each other. Built by the architect Clari at the beginnings of the 20th century with a late Art Nouveau style. The house is now used as the Café Bar Casa Clari. The newly built Miguel Acevedo addition is used as an art gallery

Clari-Mestre House

This building, adjoining with “Casa Clari” was built in 1912 in a neoclassical style. When it was restored, it had a zinc roof, which was supposedly placed after its initial construction. The ceiling was made of cardboard, with relief and no colors. Due to the bad condition of the ceiling and roof, it was decided to put a tile roof on the house.

Because the house has different levels, it was easy to create an auditorium. The Ruy Diaz de Guzmán auditorium is used for concerts, theater shows, dance shows and book presentations among various other activities.

Vertúa House

From all the buildings that make up the Manzana, this was the only one that had the possibilities of having a second floor. It was built in 1898 in a neoclassic style. There used to be a sweetshop with the same name.

In 1993 it turns into the office of the Municipal Library, having more than 20.000 volumes of books. It also has an “hemeroteca” a place for quick and actualized reading, as well as a mobile library service that visits many schools and parks in the city.

Emasa House

At the point of restoration, this building needed the most work. It was first used as a customs office, with a number of big rooms along one side of a hallway. After that, a printing house had been using the building, and it was necessary to remove part of the roof.

Nowadays, the office of the Cultural Centre of the city, the office of the Spanish Agency of International Cooperation (Agencia Española de Cooperacion Internacional), and the office of the Paraguayan Chamber of the Associated Booksellers (Camara paraguaya de Libreros Asociados) are in there. It also has a space named “La Galeria” (the gallery) that works as an exhibition place, mainly of sculptures and equipment.

Castelví House

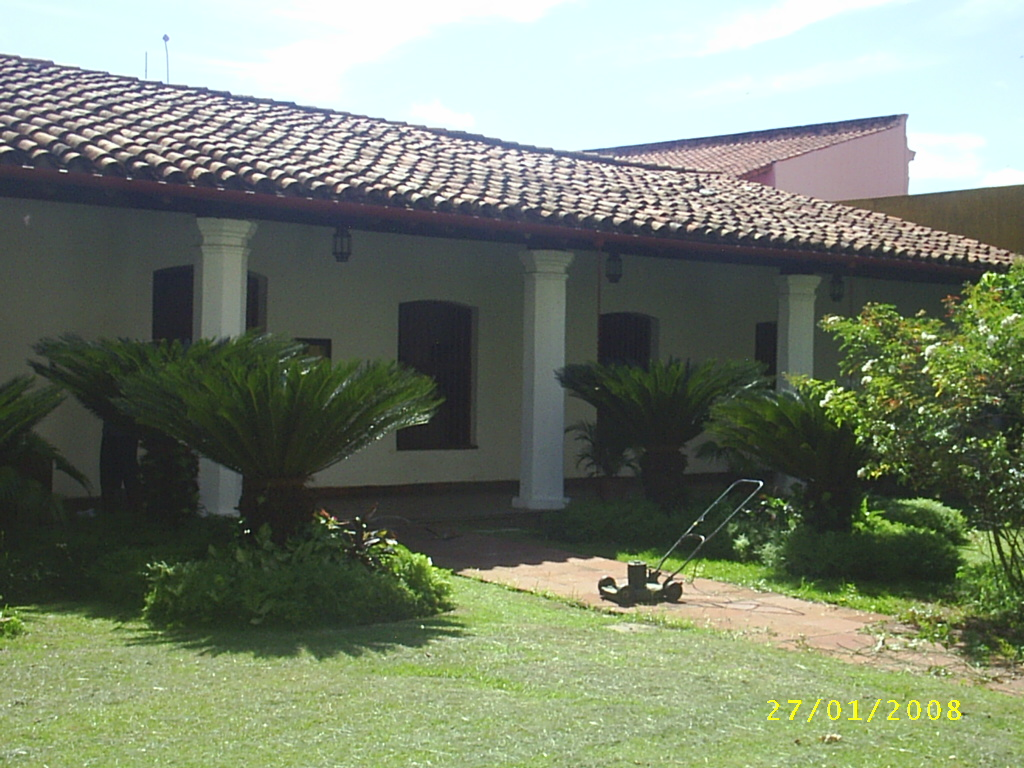
House Castelví

Previously known as the “Casa Serra”, the “Castelvi House” is a building from the year 1804, and was still built within the colonial system. The house was built by the Catalan José Castelvi, who was Asuncion's vice mayor. It has the original doors, windows, window bars, and one of the floors. It's a pre-Franciscan house, located 15 m from the street; it has an external garden that forms part of the urban zone.

Nowadays there are two exhibition rooms: Juan A. Samudio and Domingo Martínez de Irala. There is also a playroom for the kids. In the garden of the house is named Patio Arecayá in commemoration of the Arecayá Indian rebellion, and is used for various outside activities.

Serra I and Serra II Houses

Both houses represent the neoclassical style of housing, with rooms located near the street. They have two hallways, so it's supposed that they were two houses that merged into each other.

It now houses the Municipal videotheque which has videos and documentaries on educational and cultural topics, especially designed for students. In the Patio Leonor, (joining of the internal gardens between “Castelvi” and “serra I and II”) different kinds of shows are carried out.

Ballario

Built in 1901 in a neoclassical style, this was the house that was restored last in June, 1996. The house is site of the offices of the UNESCO in Paraguay.

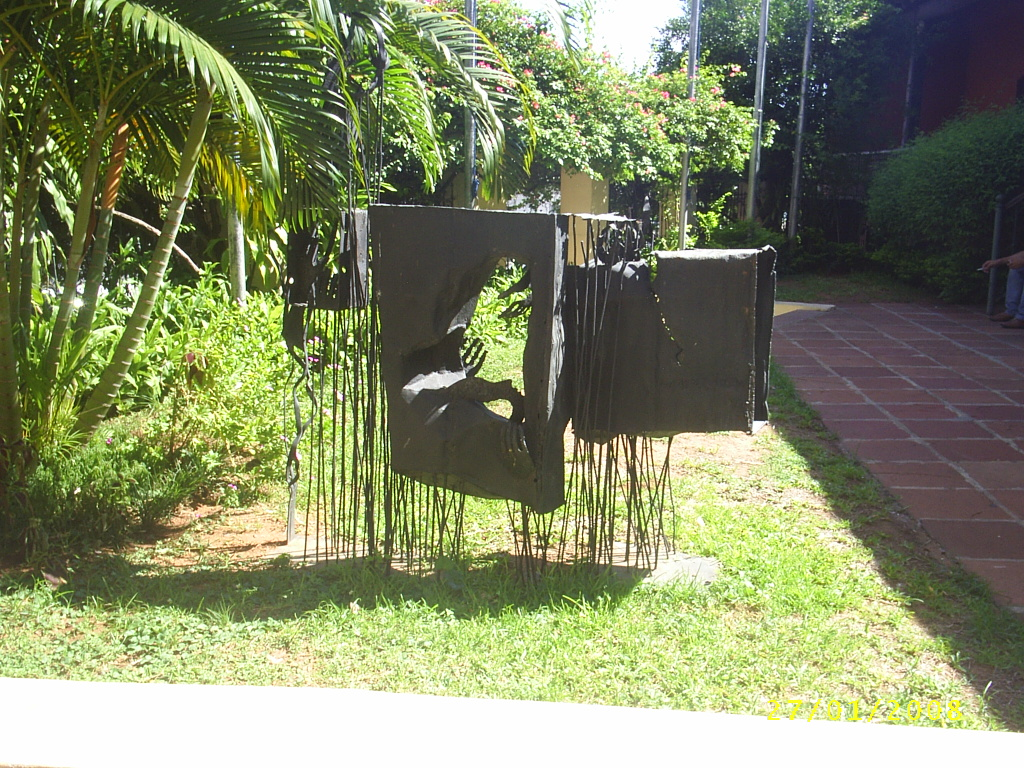
Sculpture at the entrance of la Manzana de la Rivera

== Other facts ==
In 1993 there were plans to build an experimental theater in the wasteground that was part of the Manzana. A design contest was set up, in which young architects were asked to submit their ideas. The winner was Javier Corvalán. The multi-use lounge Federico García Lorca was inaugurated on June 26, 1999, with the visit of the Spanish president José María Aznar.

== Opening hours ==
- Museo Memoria de la Ciudad (City Memory Museum)

Monday to Friday: from 08.00 to 21.00 Saturday: from 10.00 to 20.00 Sunday: from 10.00 to 19.00

- Espacio Miguel Acevedo y Galería (Miguel Acevedo space and Gallery)

Monday to Friday: form 08.00 to 21.00 Saturday: from 10.00 to 20.00 Sunday: from 10.00 to 19.00

- Casa Castelví

Monday to Friday: from 08.00 to 13.30 Saturday: from 10.00 to 20.00 Sunday: from 10.00 to 19.00

- Biblioteca Municipal (Municipal Library)

Monday to Friday: from 07.00 to 19.00 Saturday: from 08.00 to 12.00

- Videoteca Municipal (municipal Videotheque)

Monday to Friday: from 12.00 to 17.30
