= Cardener =

River in Spain

Coordinates: 42°10′32″N 1°35′27″E

The Cardener (Catalan pronunciation: [kəɾðəˈne]) is a river in Catalonia, Spain. Its source is at Les Fonts del Cardener in the municipality of La Coma i la Pedra (Solsonès) at an elevation of 1,050 metres (3,440 ft). It drains a basin of 1,500 square kilometres (580 mi^{2}). It passes through the reservoir of Sant Ponç (25 hm^{3}) between Olius and Clariana de Cardener (Solsonès), Cardona, Súria, and Manresa (Bages) before joining the Llobregat at Castellgalí (Bages).

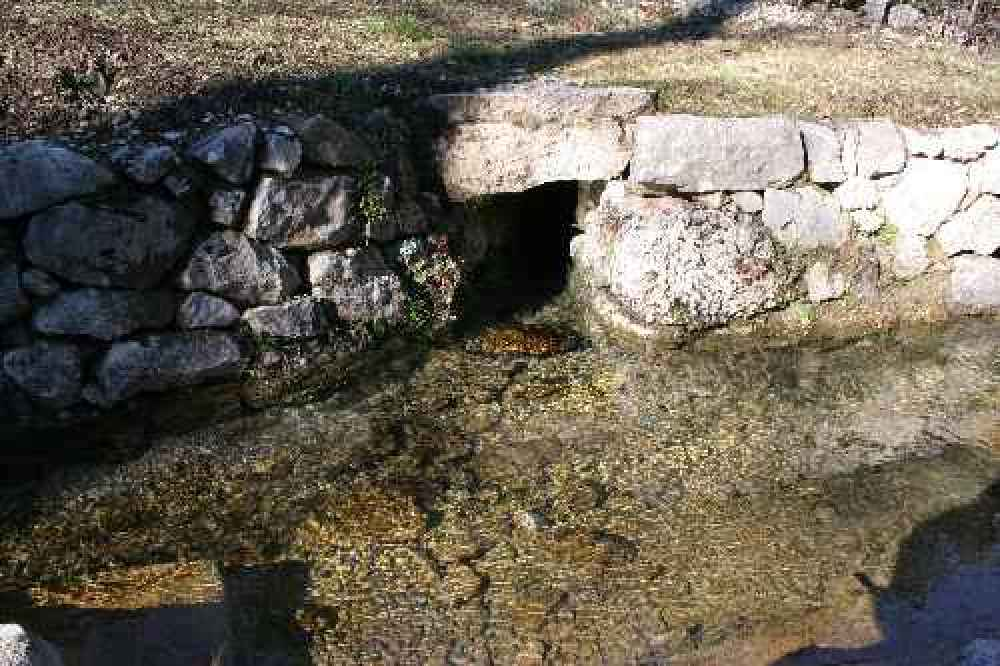
One of the Cardener's sources

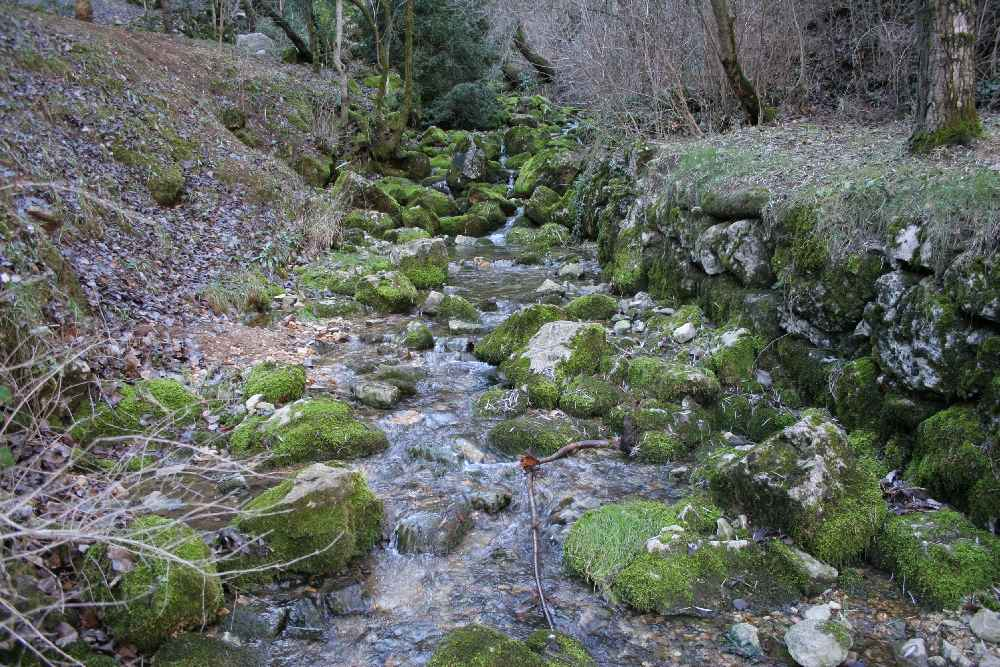
Headwaters of the Cardener river

== See also ==
- List of rivers of Spain
