= Serafín Marsal =

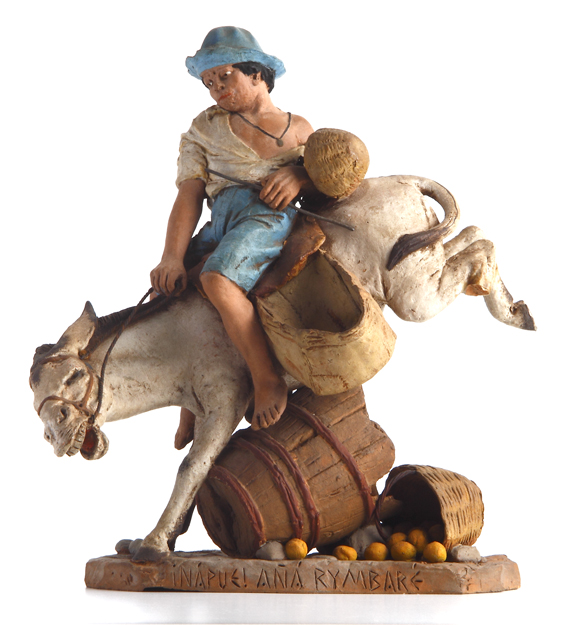
The Boy and the Donkey. Marsal had an extreme ability to sculpt animals

Serafin Marsal (Cardona, Spain, 1862 – Asunción, 1956) was a Spanish born Paraguayan sculptor.

== Biography ==
After studying for six years at the Academy of Fine Arts in Barcelona, Marsal moved to Buenos Aires, where several French, Italian and Spanish artists in sculpture and metal engraving became famous.

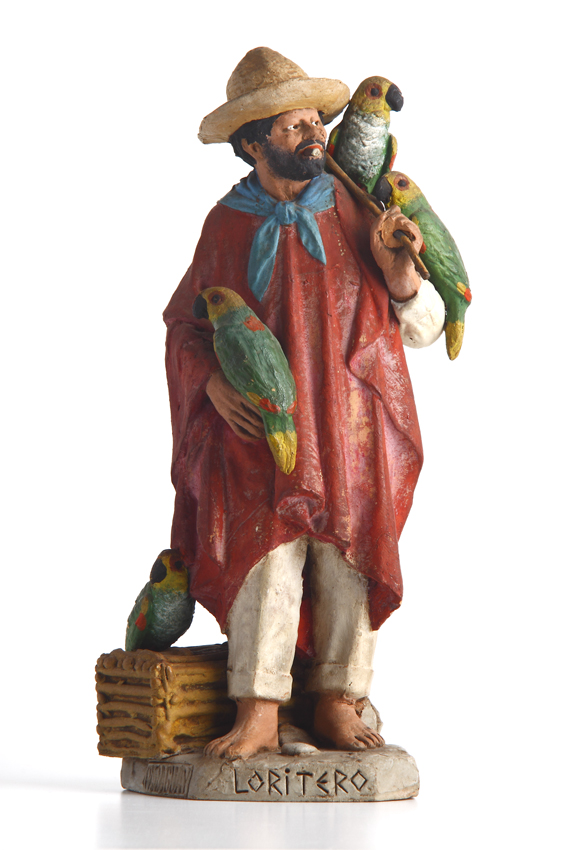
Loritero, beautiful statuette made by Serafin Marsal

In 1898, Marsal received the third prize from the National Fine Arts Exhibition of Buenos Aires. The next year, he accepted an invitation to teach drawing and sculpture in Santa Fé. There, Marsal participated in urban planning, sculpture production and became part of the city's artistic and cultural life. One of his sculptures, a bust of the educator called Sarmento, remains in the plaza dedicated to the teacher. In 1901, he became Art Director of the "Blanco & Negro" magazine. In 1907, at the age of 46 and highly recognized in the artistic field, Marsal moved to Asunción in Paraguay according to medical recommendations, due to the health problems experienced by his wife. In this smaller city, he faced economic difficulties, as orders were rarer. He taught at the Arts School. Even with no orders, Marsal started to produce small clay statues that represented the Paraguayan people with perfection.

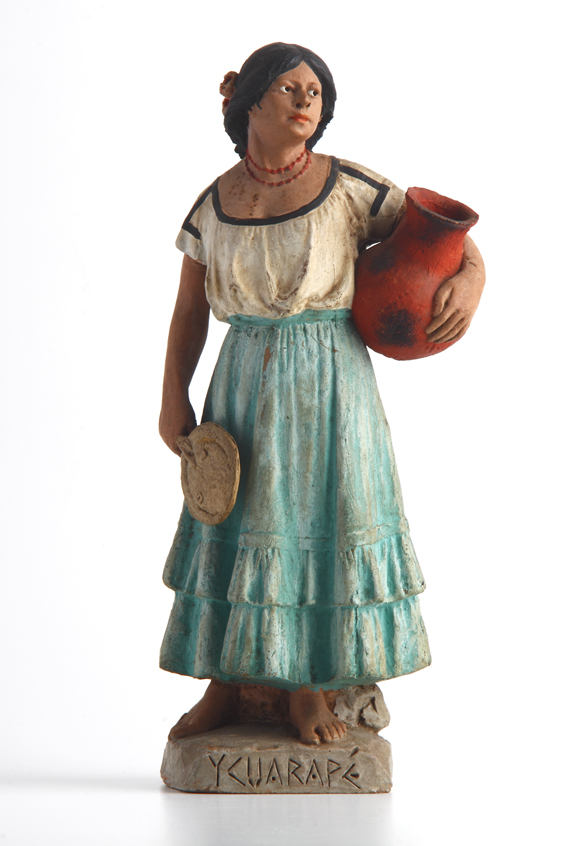
Paraguayan woman, represented in the figure by Marsal

== Artworks ==
Made by hand with clay from the Pilcomayo River, each statuette represented a typical figure of the Paraguayan people with a variety of details and beautiful finishing. Marsal made each figure using a mould from which he extracted the essential piece. However, his method was not a multiple-piece system, so the finishing of each piece was done by hand, and one was different from the other. Besides beauty and careful finishing, his pieces have an important historical value, as they portray typical figures of a period. They are social representations: There is a woman carrying a jar over her head, a donkey as a means of transportation, Indian faces, a man who sold fruits, among many others that frequented the Asunción market. In addition, all figures were entitled in Guaraní, the people's language. In autobiographical notes, Marsal once wrote:

"For approximately 18 years I dedicate myself to making little figures in clay. I calculate that perhaps one hundred small figures were created monthly in my house to be sold in North America, fifty thousand to be sold in Central America and South America; in Europe, four or five thousand; in Japan a bit more one thousand, and many others whose destination I ignore".

To date, what remains of his works, as the used material is quite fragile, belongs to private collections and to the Museo Memoria de la Ciudad, which has a collection of 36 pieces.
