= El Pont de Vilomara i Rocafort =

- Municipality
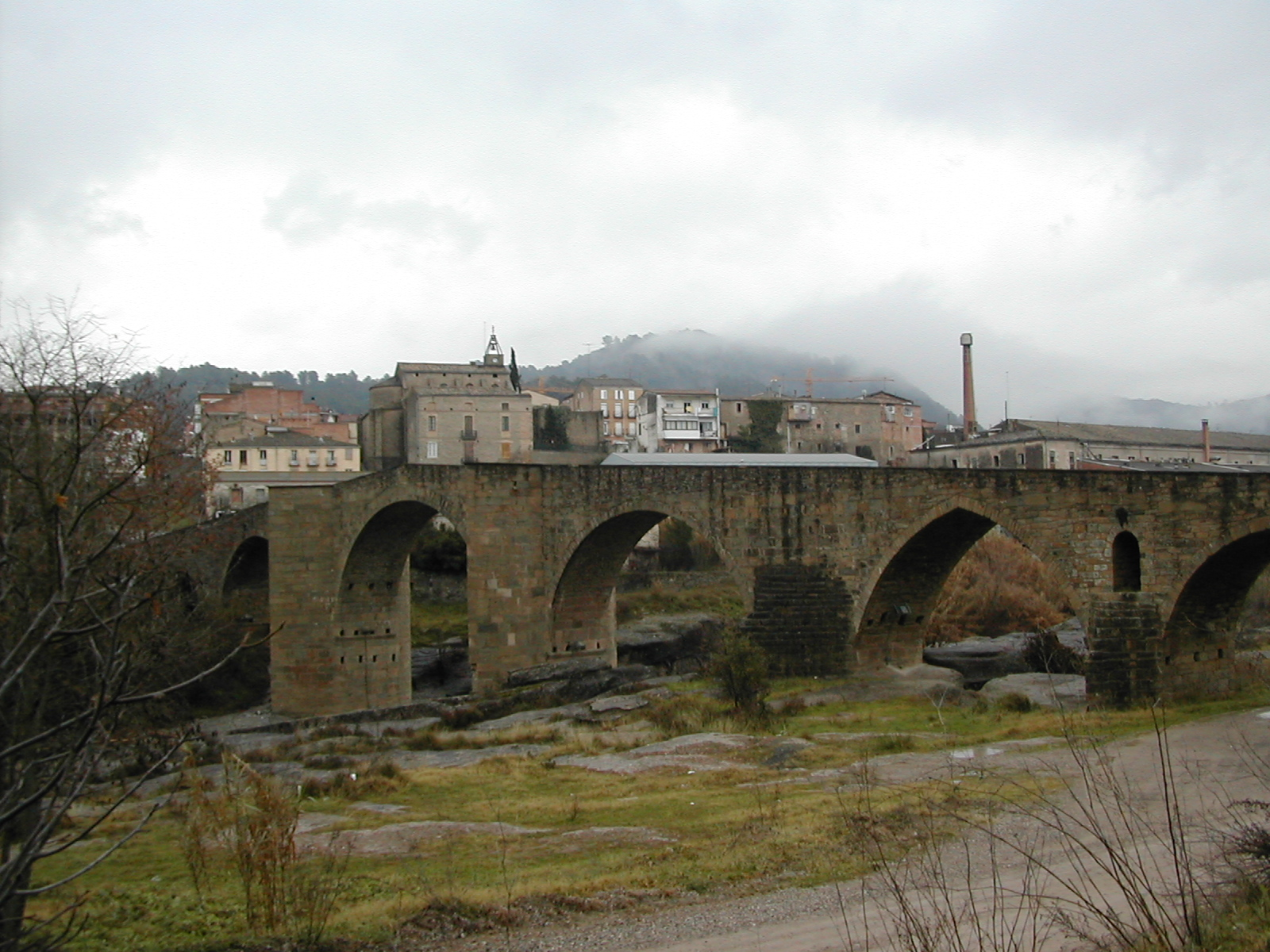
- The gothic bridge over the Llobregat river

- Coat of arms

- Location in Catalonia El Pont de Vilomara i Rocafort (Spain)
- Coordinates: 41.702°N 1.873°E
- Country: Spain
- Community: Catalonia
- Province: Barcelona
- Comarca: Bages

Government
  - Mayor: Cecilio Rodríguez Martín (2015)

Area
  - Total: 27.4 km^{2} (10.6 sq mi)

Population (2025-01-01)
  - Total: 4,193
  - Density: 153/km^{2} (396/sq mi)
- Website: www.elpont.cat

El Pont de Vilomara i Rocafort (Catalan pronunciation: [əl ˈpɔn də βiluˈmaɾəj ˌrɔkəˈfɔɾt]) is a municipality in the province of Barcelona and autonomous community of Catalonia, Spain. It covers an area of 27.35 square kilometres (10.56 sq mi) and the population in 2014 was 3,780.

The municipality comprises the settlements of El Pont de Vilomara (1998 population 2,111), Rocafort (55), and River Parc (36).

== Notable people ==
- Jonathan Soriano (born 1985), former professional footballer
