= Cardona, Spain =

Cardona
- Municipality
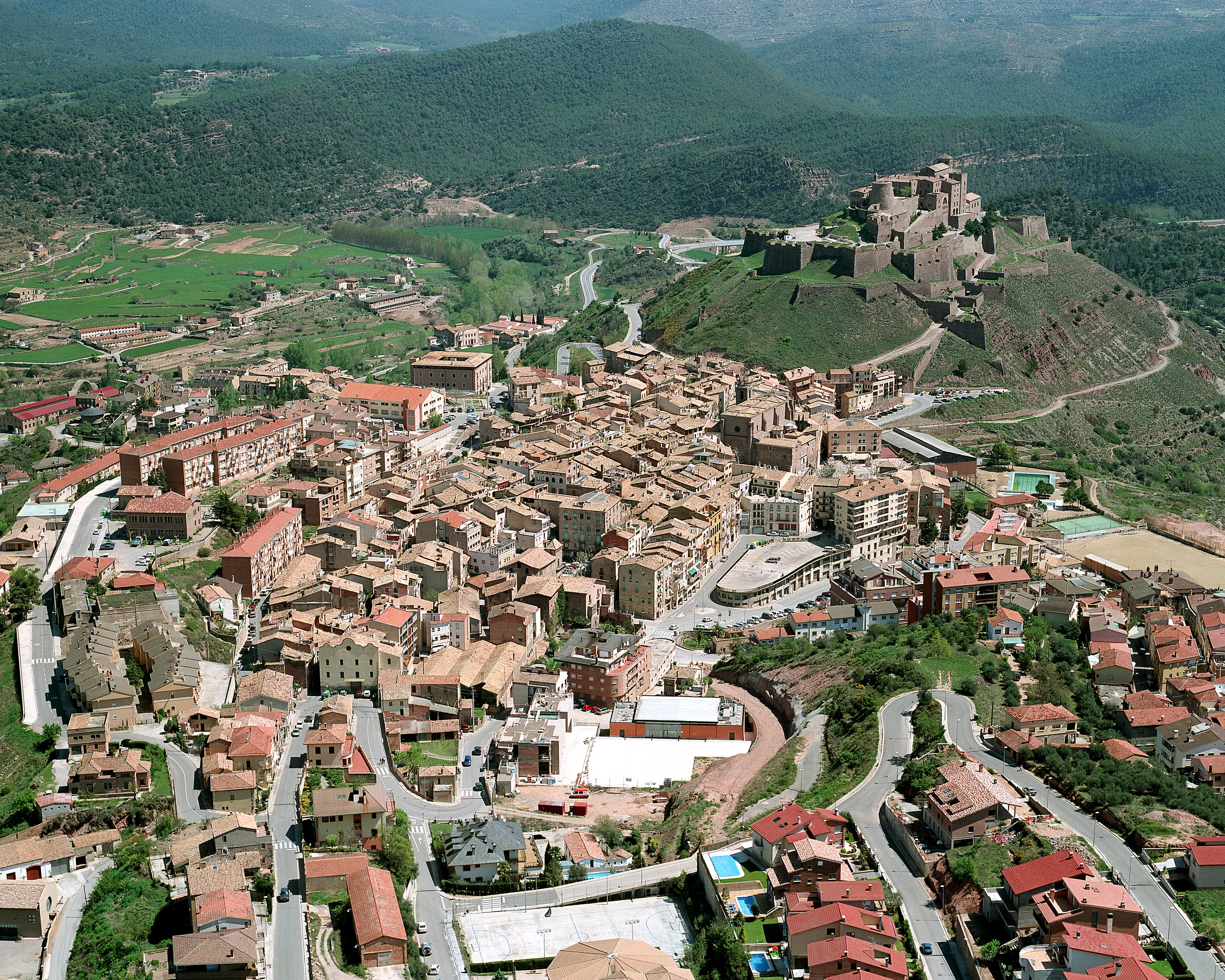
- Cardona from the air

- Coat of arms

- Location in Catalonia Cardona (Spain)
- Coordinates: 41°54′49″N 1°40′50″E
- Country: Spain
- Community: Catalonia
- Province: Barcelona
- Comarca: Bages

Government
  - Mayor: Ferran Estruch Torrents (2015)

Area
  - Total: 66.7 km^{2} (25.8 sq mi)
- Elevation: 506 m (1,660 ft)

Population (2025-01-01)
  - Total: 4,553
  - Density: 68.3/km^{2} (177/sq mi)
- Postal code: 08261
- Website: www.cardona.cat

Cardona (Catalan pronunciation: [kəɾˈðonə]) is a town in the Spanish region of Catalonia, in the province of Barcelona; about 90 km (56 mi) northwest of the city of Barcelona, on a hill almost surrounded by the river Cardener, a branch of the Llobregat. To the east of the town, the river has been diverted through a tunnel has been dug through a spur, leaving a loop of dry river bed near the saltmine.

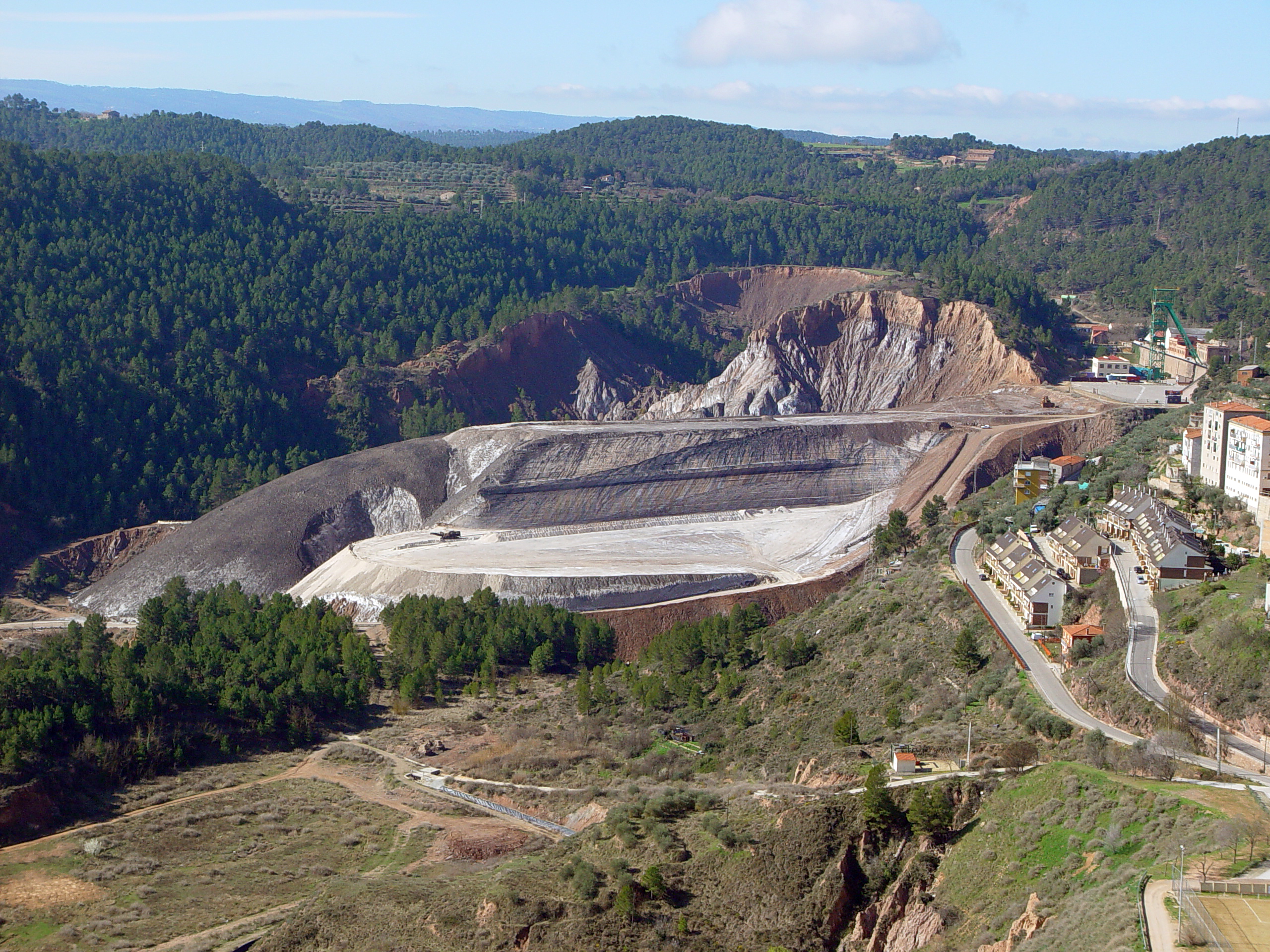
Rock salt mine in Cardona

Near the town is an extensive deposit of rock salt. The salt forms a mountain mass (called Muntanya de Sal) covered by a thick bed of a reddish-brown clay, and apparently resting on a yellowish-grey sandstone. It is generally more or less translucent, and large masses of it are quite transparent. The hill has been worked like a mine since Roman times; pieces cut from it have been carved by artists in Cardona into images, crucifixes and many articles of an ornamental kind.

== Main sights ==
- The Castle of Cardona, which is set high on a hill and contains a Parador hotel.
- The 11th-century Romanesque church of Sant Vicenç. The portico of the church was once covered with murals. Fragments of these "painted vaults" were restored in 1960 and are now displayed at the Museu Nacional d'Art de Catalunya in Barcelona.
- The Church of Sant Miquel, built in the 11th century and rebuilt in the 14th century in Gothic style. It houses a precious polyptych by Pere Vall, depicting St. Anne, the Virgin and St. Amador, and a 15th-century baptismal font.

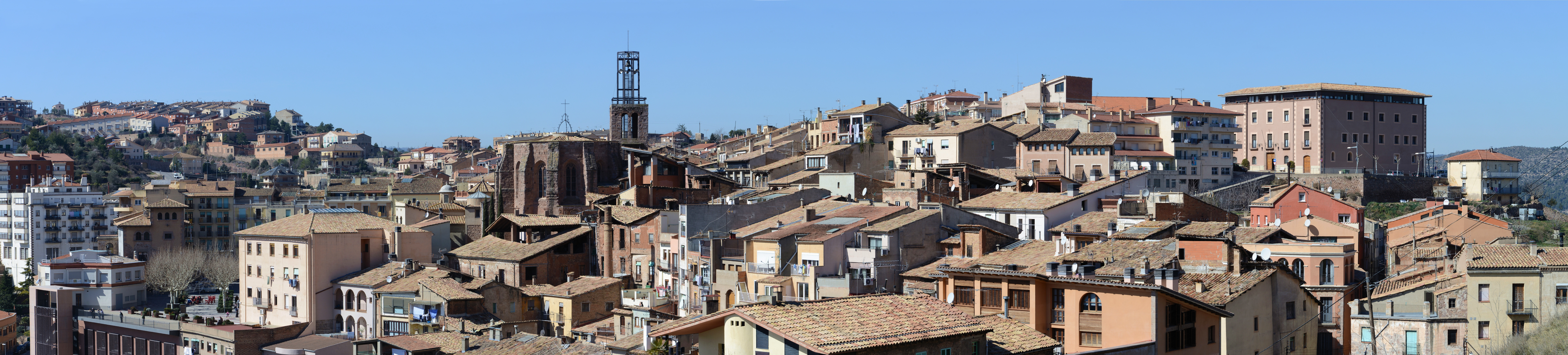
Panoramic view of the village, from near the castle

== Local festivals ==
- Caramelles: The Sunday of Passover
- Mercat de la ganga: The first Sunday of February
- Fira de Pentecostés: The first Sunday of June
- Fira de la Llenega: The last Sunday of October
- Festa Major: The second last weekend in September
- Aplec de Cardona: 18 September

== Notable people ==
- Serafín Marsal (1862–1956), Paraguayan sculptor
- Berto Romero, comedian.

== Notes ==
The movie Chimes at Midnight, by Orson Welles, was filmed at the castle in Cardona.

== Twin towns ==
- Cardona, Uruguay

== Bibliography ==
- Pedrosa, Andreu (2001). The Castle of Cardona. Sant Vincenç de Castellet: Farell. ISBN 84-930418-8-2
- Panareda Clopés, Josep Maria; Rios Calvet, Jaume; Rabella Vives, Josep Maria (1989). Guia de Catalunya, Barcelona: Caixa de Catalunya. ISBN 84-87135-01-3 (Spanish). ISBN 84-87135-02-1 (Catalan).
