= Bages =

Coordinates: 41°46′44″N 1°51′40″E

- Comarca
- Country: Spain
- Autonomous community: Catalonia
- Province: Barcelona
- Region: Central Catalonia
- Capital: Manresa
- Municipalities: List: Aguilar de Segarra, Artés, Avinyó, Balsareny, Callús, Cardona, Castellbell i el Vilar, Castellfollit del Boix, Castellgalí, Castellnou de Bages, Fonollosa, Gaià, Manresa, Marganell, Monistrol de Montserrat, Mura, Navarcles, Navàs, El Pont de Vilomara i Rocafort, Rajadell, Sallent, Sant Feliu Sasserra, Sant Fruitós de Bages, Sant Joan de Vilatorrada, Sant Mateu de Bages, Sant Salvador de Guardiola, Sant Vicenç de Castellet, Santpedor, Súria, Talamanca

Government
  - Body: Bages Comarcal Council
  - President: Eloi Hernàndez (ERC)

Area
  - Total: 1,092.2 km^{2} (421.7 sq mi)

Population (2014)
  - Total: 175,527
  - Density: 160.71/km^{2} (416.24/sq mi)
- adjusted following Moianès creation
- Demonym
- Time zone: UTC+1 (CET)
  - Summer (DST): UTC+2 (CEST)
- Largest municipality: Manresa

Bages (Catalan pronunciation: [ˈbaʒəs]) is a comarca (county) in the central region of Catalonia, Spain. The capital is the city of Manresa (province of Barcelona).

Industries include the mining of potash at Súria and Sallent, and the manufacture of textiles along the rivers Llobregat and Cardener. Agriculture includes vineyards, cereals, and olive groves.

To the north are Berguedà and (running clockwise) Lluçanès, Moianès, and Vallès Occidental. To the south are Baix Llobregat, Anoia and Solsonès. In May 2015, Bages lost five municipalities - Calders, L'Estany, Moià, Monistrol de Calders, Santa Maria d'Oló - to the new comarca of Moianès.

== Municipalities ==
Municipality	Population (2014)	Area km^{2}
Aguilar de Segarra	251	43.3
Artés	5,661	17.9
Avinyó	2,275	63.2
Balsareny	3,343	36.9
Callús	1,985	12.5
Cardona	4,921	66.7
Castellbell i el Vilar	3,624	28.5
Castellfollit del Boix	428	58.9
Castellgalí	2,022	17.2
Castellnou de Bages	1,241	29.2
Fonollosa	1,429	51.7
Gaià	163	39.5
Manresa	75,297	41.6
Marganell	297	13.5
Monistrol de Montserrat	2,945	11.8
Mura	211	47.8
Navarcles	6,003	5.5
Navàs	6,117	80.6
El Pont de Vilomara i Rocafort	3,780	27.4
Rajadell	528	45.5
Sallent	6,780	65.2
Sant Feliu Sasserra	626	22.4
Sant Fruitós de Bages	8,243	22.2
Sant Joan de Vilatorrada	10,733	16.4
Sant Mateu de Bages	644	102.9
Sant Salvador de Guardiola	3,130	37.2
Sant Vicenç de Castellet	9,326	17.1
Santpedor	7,384	16.6
Súria	5,999	23.6
Talamanca	141	29.4
• Total: 30	175,527	1,092.2
