= Aguilar de Segarra =

- Municipality
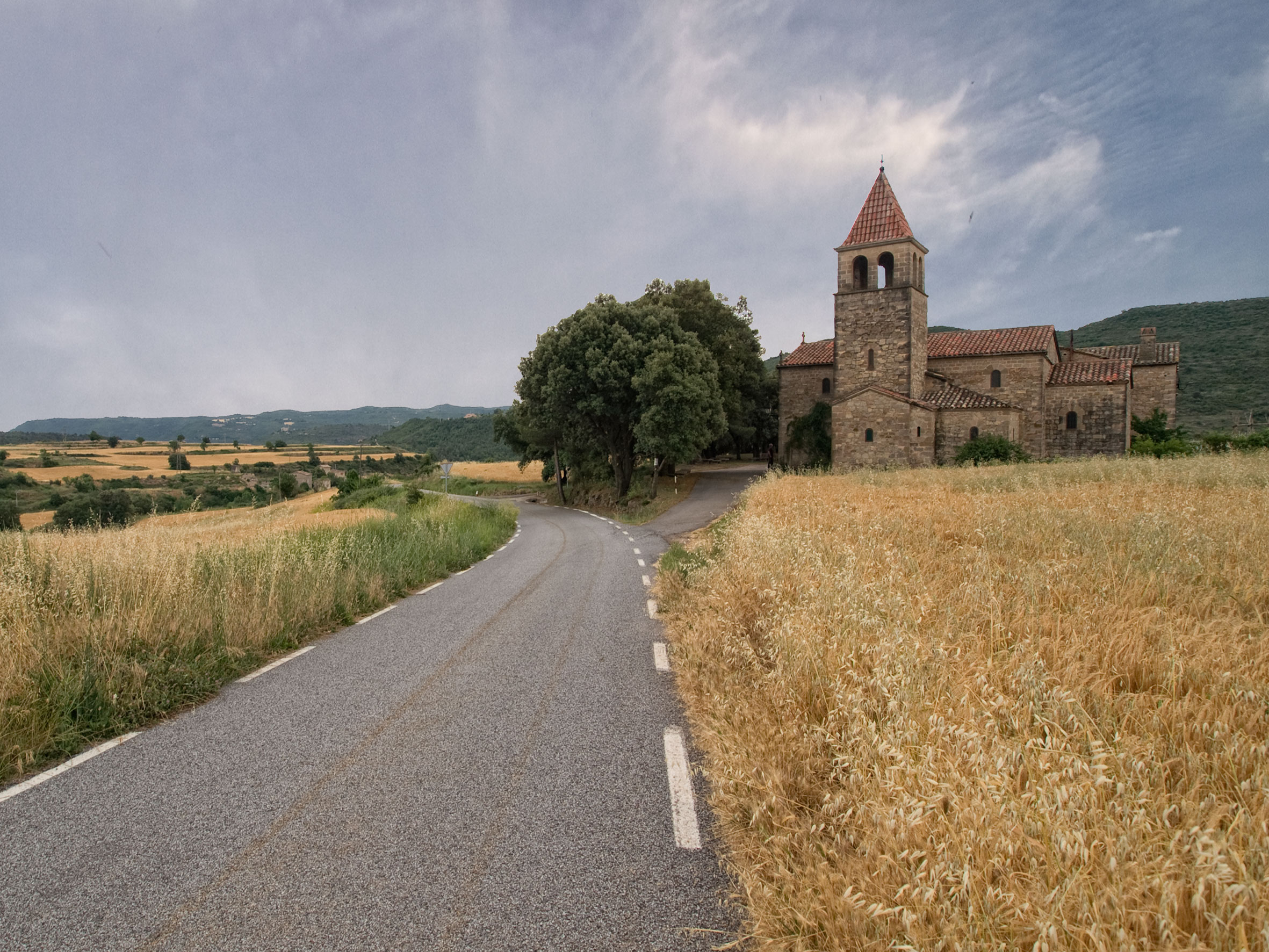
- Church of Sant Andreu d'Aguilar

- Coat of arms

- Location in Catalonia Aguilar de Segarra (Spain)
- Coordinates: 41.741°N 1.632°E
- Country: Spain
- Community: Catalonia
- Province: Barcelona
- Comarca: Bages

Government
  - Mayor: Valentí Riera Vilaplana (2015)

Area
  - Total: 43.14 km^{2} (16.66 sq mi)

Population (November 1, 2011)
  - Total: 252
  - Density: 5.841/km^{2} (15.13/sq mi)
- Time zone: UTC+01:00 (CET)
- Postal code: 08256
- Area code: 080023
- Website: Official website

Aguilar de Segarra (Catalan pronunciation: [əɣiˈla ðə səˈɣarə]) is a municipality in the comarca of Bages, on the western edge of the comarca, in the province of Barcelona, Catalonia, Spain.

Aguilar de Segarra has several notable buildings: the Castle of Castellar, the Castle of Aguilar, and the churches of Sant Andreu d'Aguilar, Sant Miquel de Castellar, Santa Magdalena de Còdol-Rodon, Santa Maria de les Coromines and Santa Maria del Grauet.

== Demography ==
According to Spanish census data, this is the population of Aguilar de Segarra in recent years.

1981	1991	2001	2011
219	191	220	252
