= Fonollosa =

- Municipality
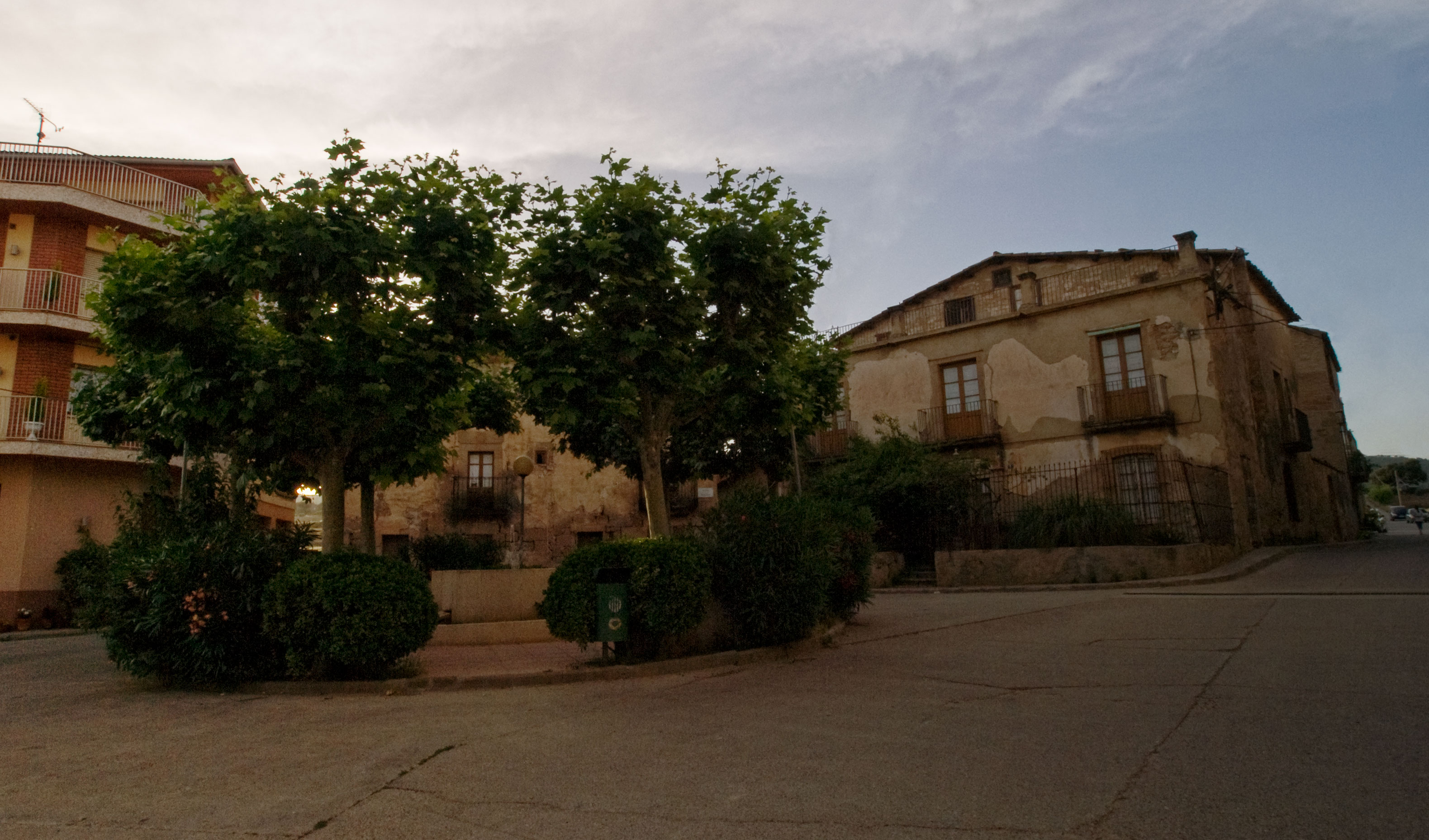

- Coat of arms

- Location in Catalonia Fonollosa (Spain)
- Coordinates: 41.763°N 1.668°E
- Country: Spain
- Community: Catalonia
- Province: Barcelona
- Comarca: Bages

Government
  - Mayor: Eloi Hernàndez Mosella (2015)

Area
  - Total: 51.7 km^{2} (20.0 sq mi)

Population (2025-01-01)
  - Total: 1,570
  - Density: 30.4/km^{2} (78.7/sq mi)
- Website: www.fonollosa.cat

Fonollosa (Catalan pronunciation: [funuˈʎozə]) is a municipality in the province of Barcelona and autonomous community of Catalonia, Spain. The municipality covers an area of 51.67 square kilometres (19.95 sq mi) and the population in 2014 was 1,429.
