= Sant Mateu de Bages =

- Municipality
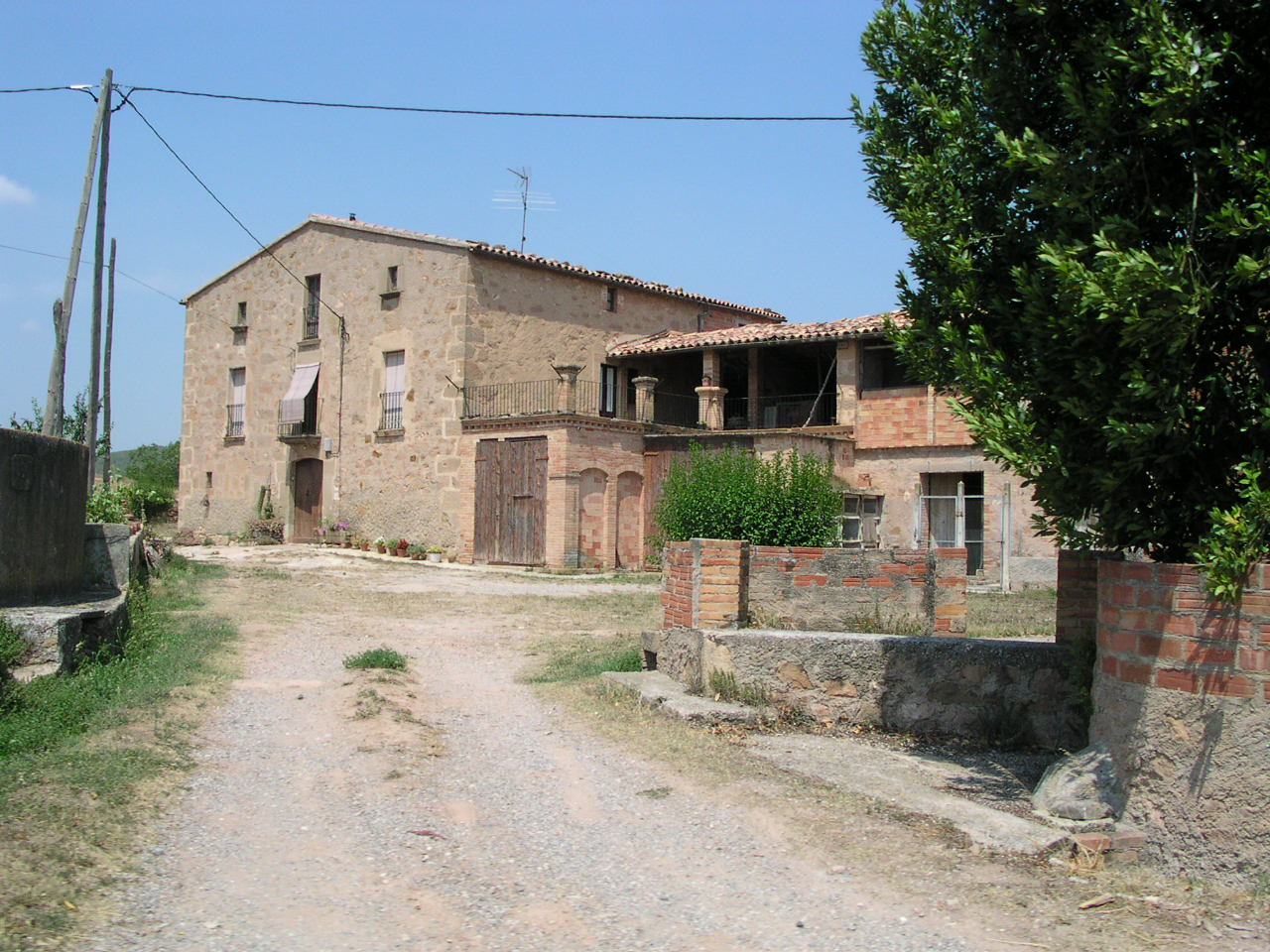
- Street in Sant Mateu de Bages

- Coat of arms

- Location in Catalonia Sant Mateu de Bages (Spain)
- Coordinates: 41.797°N 1.733°E
- Country: Spain
- Community: Catalonia
- Province: Barcelona
- Comarca: Bages

Government
  - Mayor: Pere Ribera Guals (2015)

Area
  - Total: 102.9 km^{2} (39.7 sq mi)

Population (2025-01-01)
  - Total: 641
  - Density: 6.23/km^{2} (16.1/sq mi)
- Website: www.santmateudebages.cat

Sant Mateu de Bages (Catalan pronunciation: [ˈsam məˈtew ðə ˈβaʒəs]) is a village in the comarca of Bages in province of Barcelona and autonomous community of Catalonia, Spain. The municipality covers an area of 102.93 square kilometres (39.74 sq mi) and the population in 2014 was 644.
