= Rajadell =

- Municipality
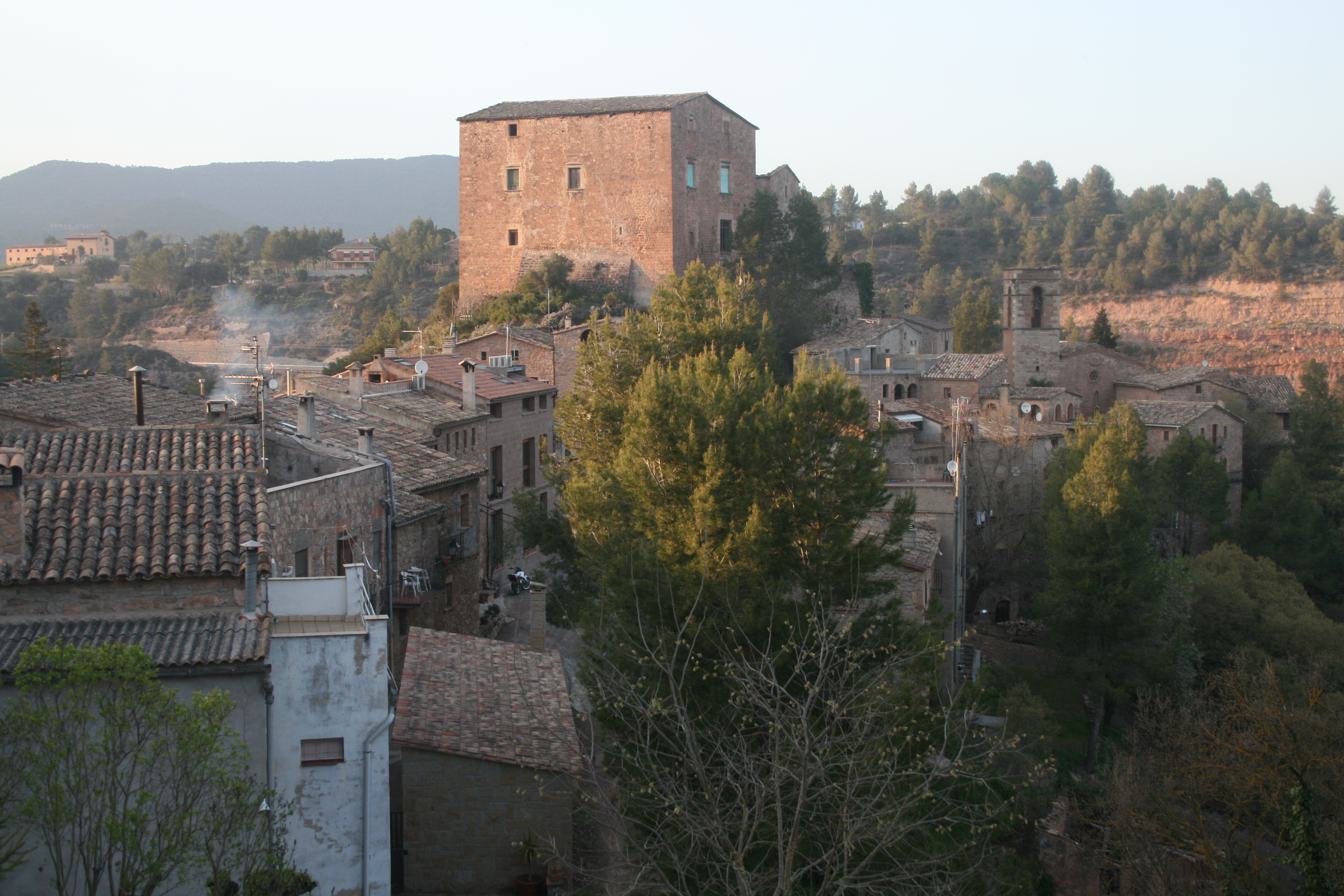
- Rajadell and its castle

- Location in Catalonia Rajadell (Spain)
- Coordinates: 41°43′45″N 1°42′20″E
- Country: Spain
- Community: Catalonia
- Province: Barcelona
- Comarca: Bages

Government
  - Mayor: Joan Costa Plans (2015)

Area
  - Total: 45.5 km^{2} (17.6 sq mi)

Population (2025-01-01)
  - Total: 597
  - Density: 13.1/km^{2} (34.0/sq mi)
- Website: rajadell.org

Rajadell (Catalan pronunciation: [rəʒəˈðeʎ]) is a municipality in the province of Barcelona and autonomous community of Catalonia, Spain. The municipality covers an area of 45.53 square kilometres (17.58 sq mi) and the population in 2014 was 528. The Castle of Rajadell is located in the town.

== Demography ==
According to Spanish census data, this is the population of Rajadell in recent years.

1981	1991	2001	2011
256	288	389	542
