= Castellnou de Bages =

- Municipality
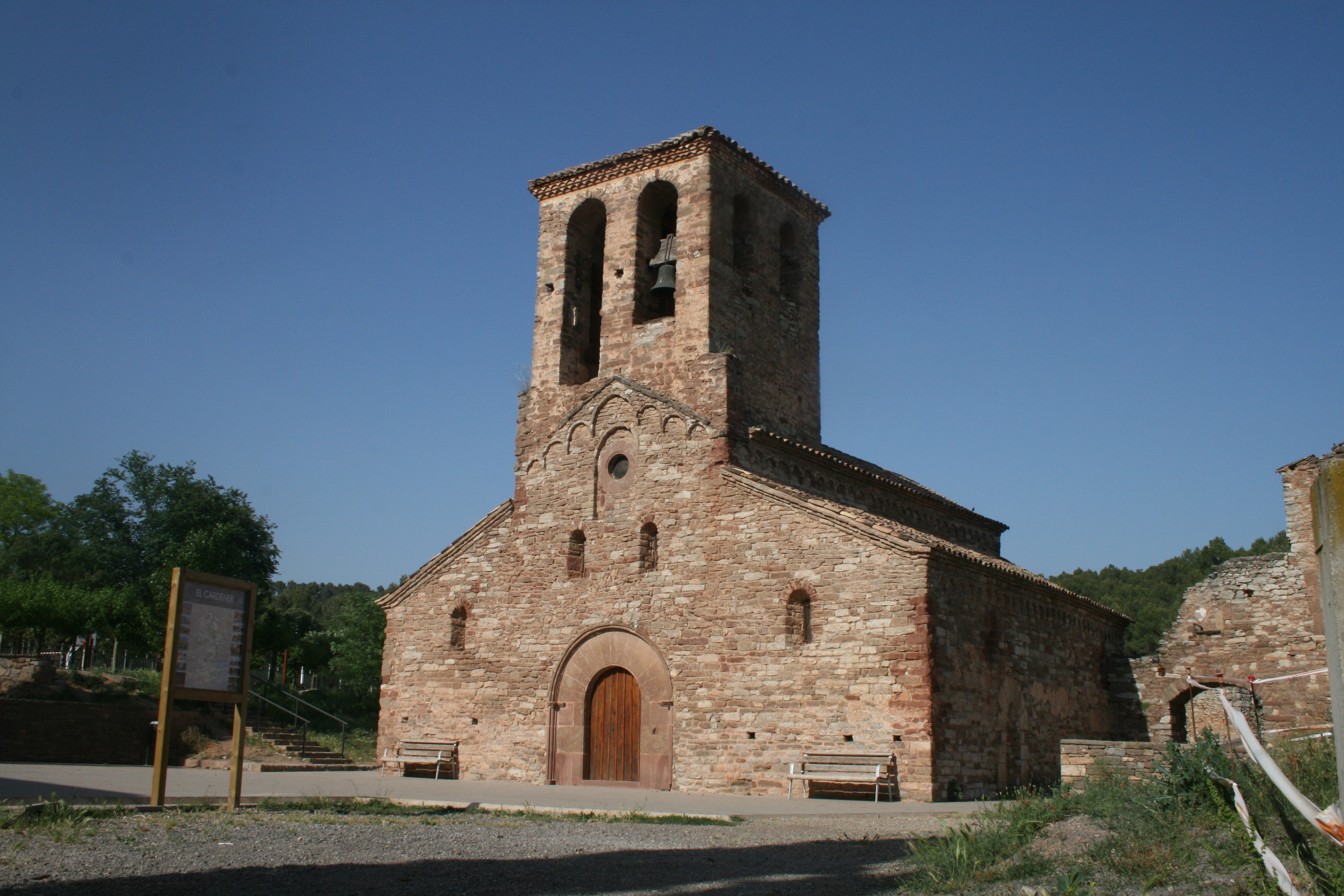
- Saint Andrew Church

- Flag Seal

- Location within Spain Location within Catalonia Location within Province of Barcelona
- Coordinates: 41°50′02.1″N 1°50′12.8″E
- Country: Spain
- Community: Catalunya
- Province: Barcelona
- Comarca: Bages

Government
  - Mayor: Domènec Òrrit

Area
  - Total: 29.14 km^{2} (11.25 sq mi)

Population (January 1, 2021)
  - Total: 1,431
  - Density: 49.11/km^{2} (127.2/sq mi)
- Time zone: UTC+01:00
- Postal code: 08251, 08260
- MCN: 08062
- Website: Official website

Castellnou de Bages (Catalan pronunciation: [kəsˌteʎˈnɔw ðə ˈβaʒəs]) is a municipality in the province of Barcelona and autonomous community of Catalonia, Spain. The municipality covers an area of 29.16 square kilometres (11.26 sq mi) and the population in 2021 was 1,431.
