= Santa Eugènia de Relat =

- Singular population entity
- Location within Spain Location within Catalonia Location within Province of Barcelona
- Coordinates: 41°53′05.1″N 1°58′49.4″E
- Country: Spain
- A. community: Catalunya
- Province: Barcelona
- Municipality: Avinyó

Population (January 1, 2024)
  - Total: 46
- Time zone: UTC+01:00
- Postal code: 08279
- MCN: 08012000200

Santa Eugènia de Relat is a singular population entity in the municipality of Avinyó, in Catalonia, Spain.

As of 2024 it has a population of 46 people.
