= Valldeperes =

- Singular population entity
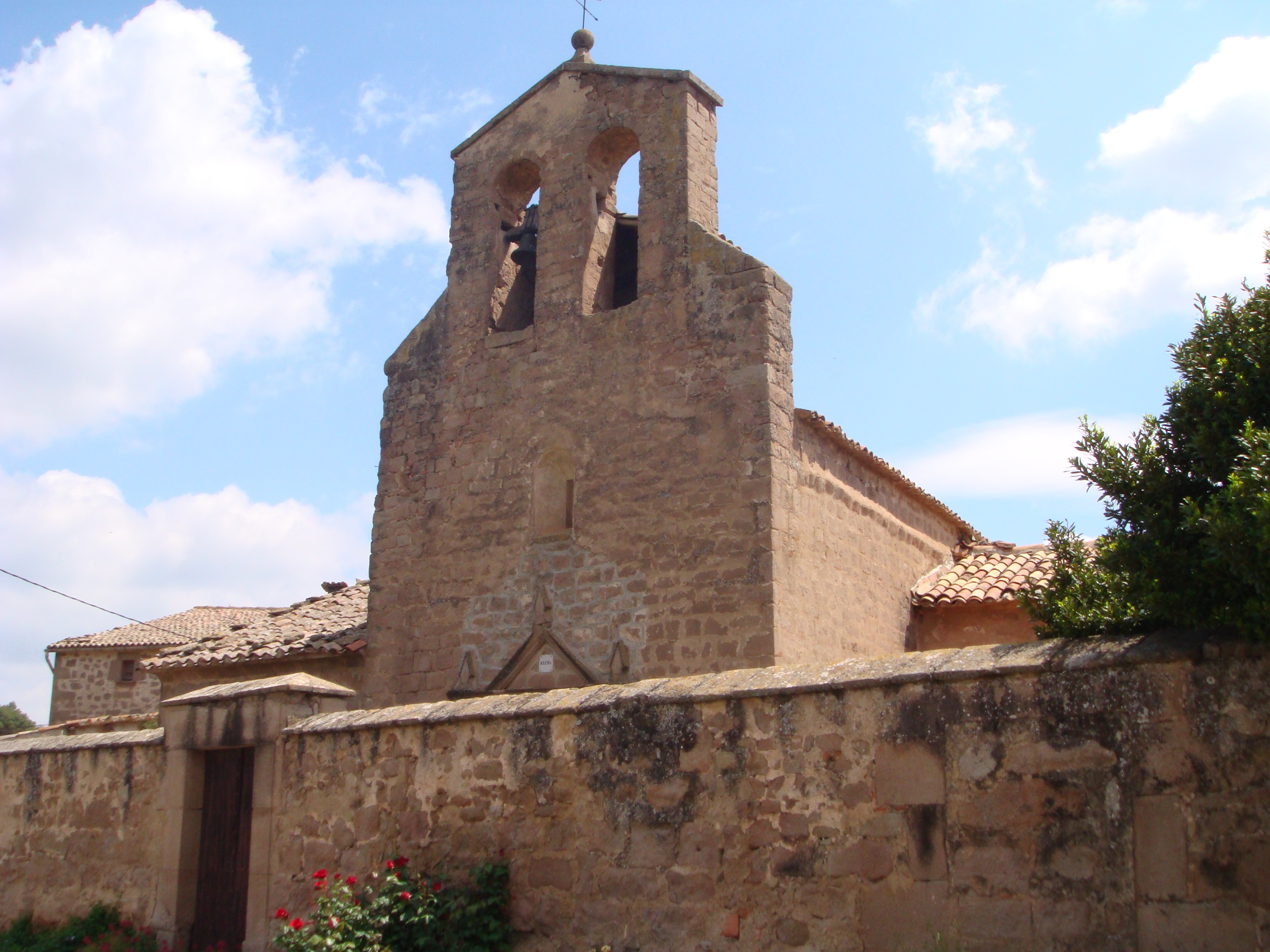
- Church of Valldeperes

- Location within Spain Location within Catalonia Location within Province of Barcelona
- Coordinates: 41°54′29.1″N 1°43′52.8″E
- Country: Spain
- A. community: Catalunya
- Province: Barcelona
- Municipality: Navàs

Population (January 1, 2024)
  - Total: 8
- Time zone: UTC+01:00
- Postal code: 08670
- MCN: 08141000700
- Website: Official website

Valldeperes is a singular population entity in the municipality of Navàs, in Catalonia, Spain.

As of 2024 it has a population of 8 people.
