= Boades =

- Singular population entity
- Location within Spain Location within Catalonia Location within Province of Barcelona
- Coordinates: 41°40′55.9″N 1°52′08.0″E
- Country: Spain
- A. community: Catalunya
- Province: Barcelona
- Municipality: Sant Vicenç de Castellet

Population (January 1, 2024)
  - Total: 15
- Time zone: UTC+01:00
- Postal code: 08295
- MCN: 08262000100

Boades is a singular population entity in the municipality of Sant Vicenç de Castellet, in Catalonia, Spain.

As of 2024 it has a population of 15 people.
