= Horta d'Avinyó =

- Singular population entity
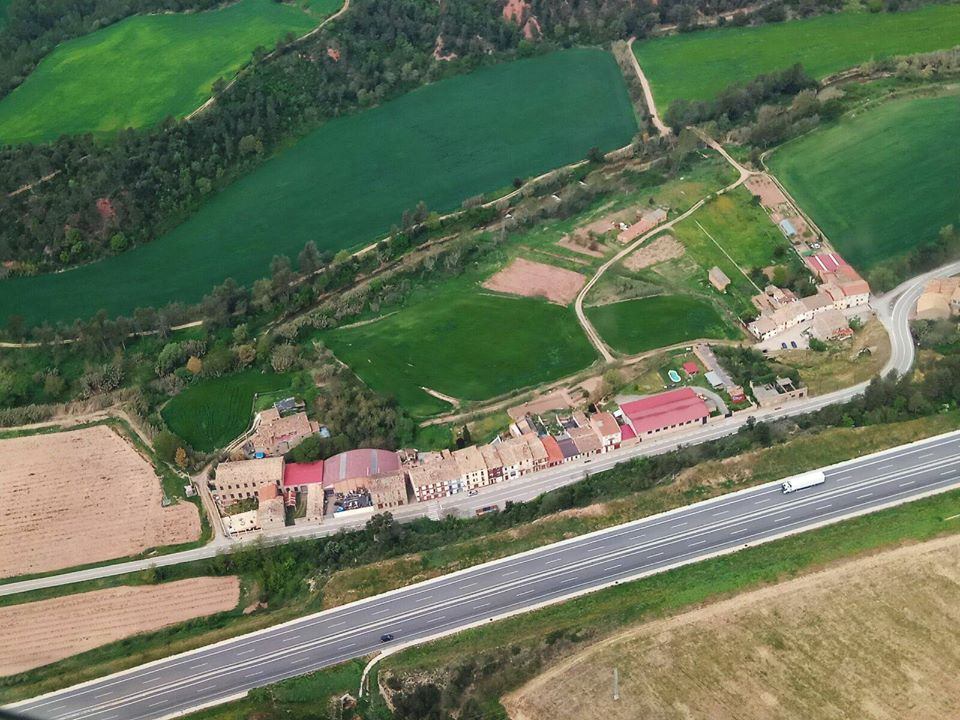
- View of Horta d'Avinyó

- Location within Spain Location within Catalonia Location within Province of Barcelona
- Coordinates: 41°49′20.2″N 1°57′54.6″E
- Country: Spain
- A. community: Catalunya
- Province: Barcelona
- Municipality: Avinyó

Population (January 1, 2024)
  - Total: 73
- Time zone: UTC+01:00
- Postal code: 08279
- MCN: 08012000300

Horta d'Avinyó is a singular population entity in the municipality of Avinyó, in Catalonia, Spain.

As of 2024 it has a population of 73 people.
