= Mas Planoi =

- Singular population entity
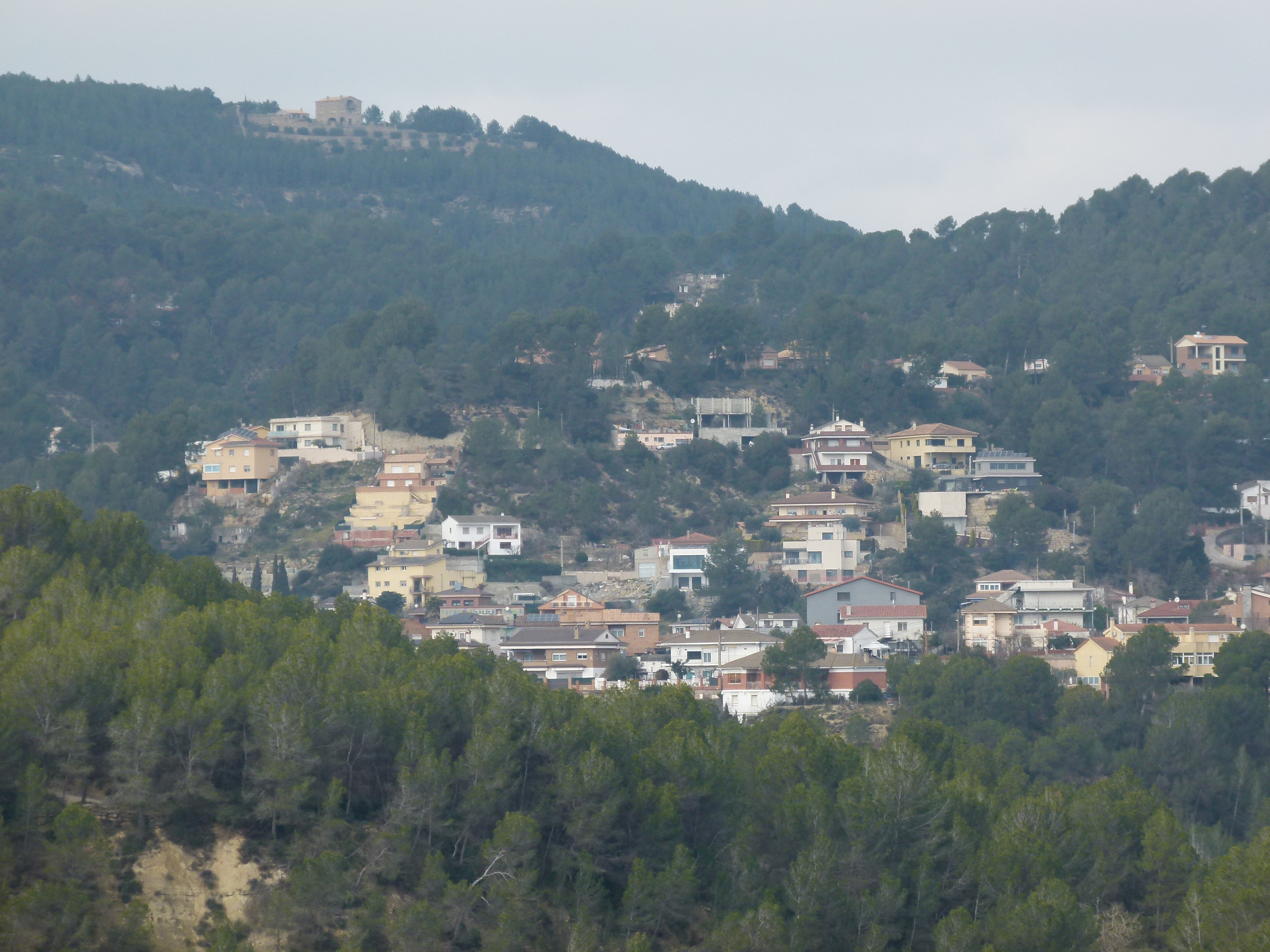
- View of Mas Planoi

- Location within Spain Location within Catalonia Location within Province of Barcelona
- Coordinates: 41°40′10.1″N 1°50′07.8″E
- Country: Spain
- A. community: Catalunya
- Province: Barcelona
- Municipality: Castellgalí

Population (January 1, 2024)
  - Total: 1,336
- Time zone: UTC+01:00
- Postal code: 08297
- MCN: 08061000900

Mas Planoi is a singular population entity in the municipality of Castellgalí, in Catalonia, Spain.

As of 2024 it has a population of 1,336 people.
