= La Balconada =

la Balconada
- Singular population entity
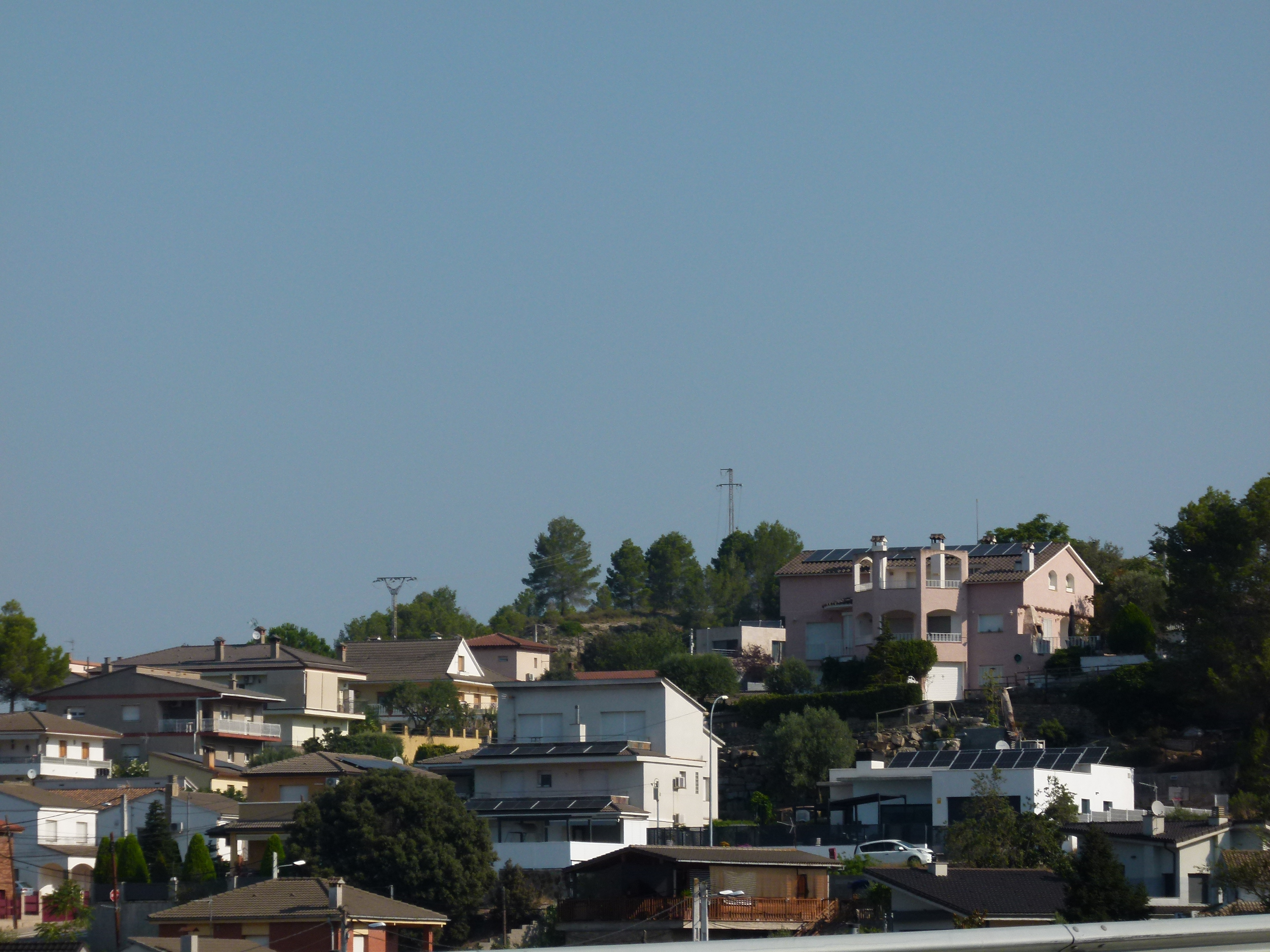
- View of la Balconada

- Location within Spain Location within Catalonia Location within Province of Barcelona
- Coordinates: 41°39′44.8″N 1°52′07.8″E
- Country: Spain
- A. community: Catalunya
- Province: Barcelona
- Municipality: Sant Vicenç de Castellet

Population (January 1, 2024)
  - Total: 327
- Time zone: UTC+01:00
- Postal code: 08295
- MCN: 08262000500

la Balconada is a singular population entity in the municipality of Sant Vicenç de Castellet, in Catalonia, Spain.

As of 2024 it has a population of 327 people.
