= Sant Iscle i Santa Victòria =

- Singular population entity
- Location within Spain Location within Catalonia Location within Province of Barcelona
- Coordinates: 41°45′30.7″N 1°50′38.3″E
- Country: Spain
- A. community: Catalunya
- Province: Barcelona
- Municipality: Sant Fruitós de Bages

Population (January 1, 2024)
  - Total: 7
- Time zone: UTC+01:00
- Postal code: 08272
- MCN: 08213000800

Sant Iscle i Santa Victòria is a singular population entity in the municipality of Sant Fruitós de Bages, in Catalonia, Spain.

As of 2024 it has a population of 7 people.
