= Castelladral =

- Singular population entity
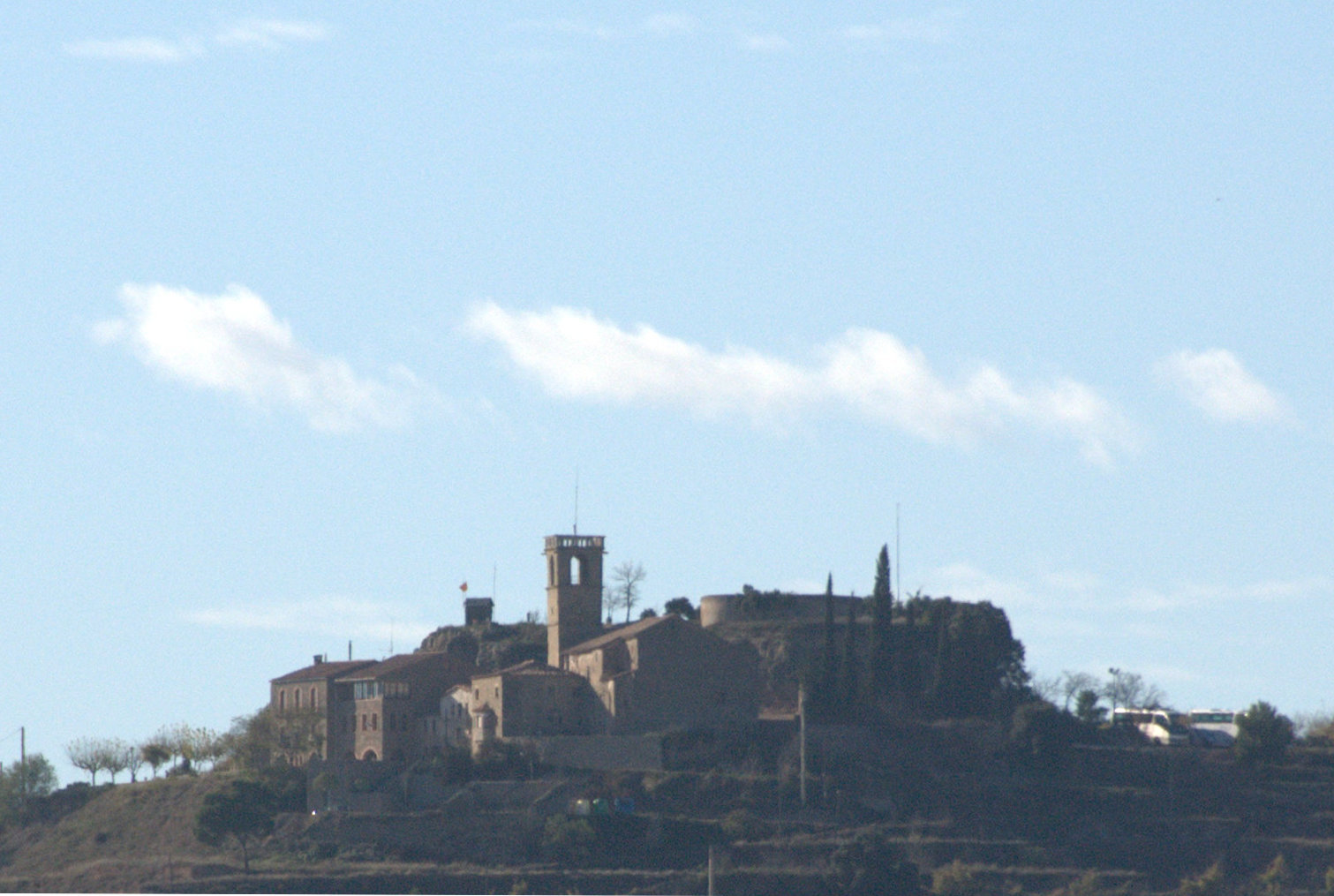
- View of Castelladral

- Location within Spain Location within Catalonia Location within Province of Barcelona
- Coordinates: 41°53′58.4″N 1°46′50.6″E
- Country: Spain
- A. community: Catalunya
- Province: Barcelona
- Municipality: Navàs

Population (January 1, 2024)
  - Total: 57
- Time zone: UTC+01:00
- Postal code: 08671
- MCN: 08141000100
- Website: Official website

Castelladral is a singular population entity in the municipality of Navàs, in Catalonia, Spain.

As of 2024 it has a population of 57 people.
