= Torroella de Baix =

- Singular population entity
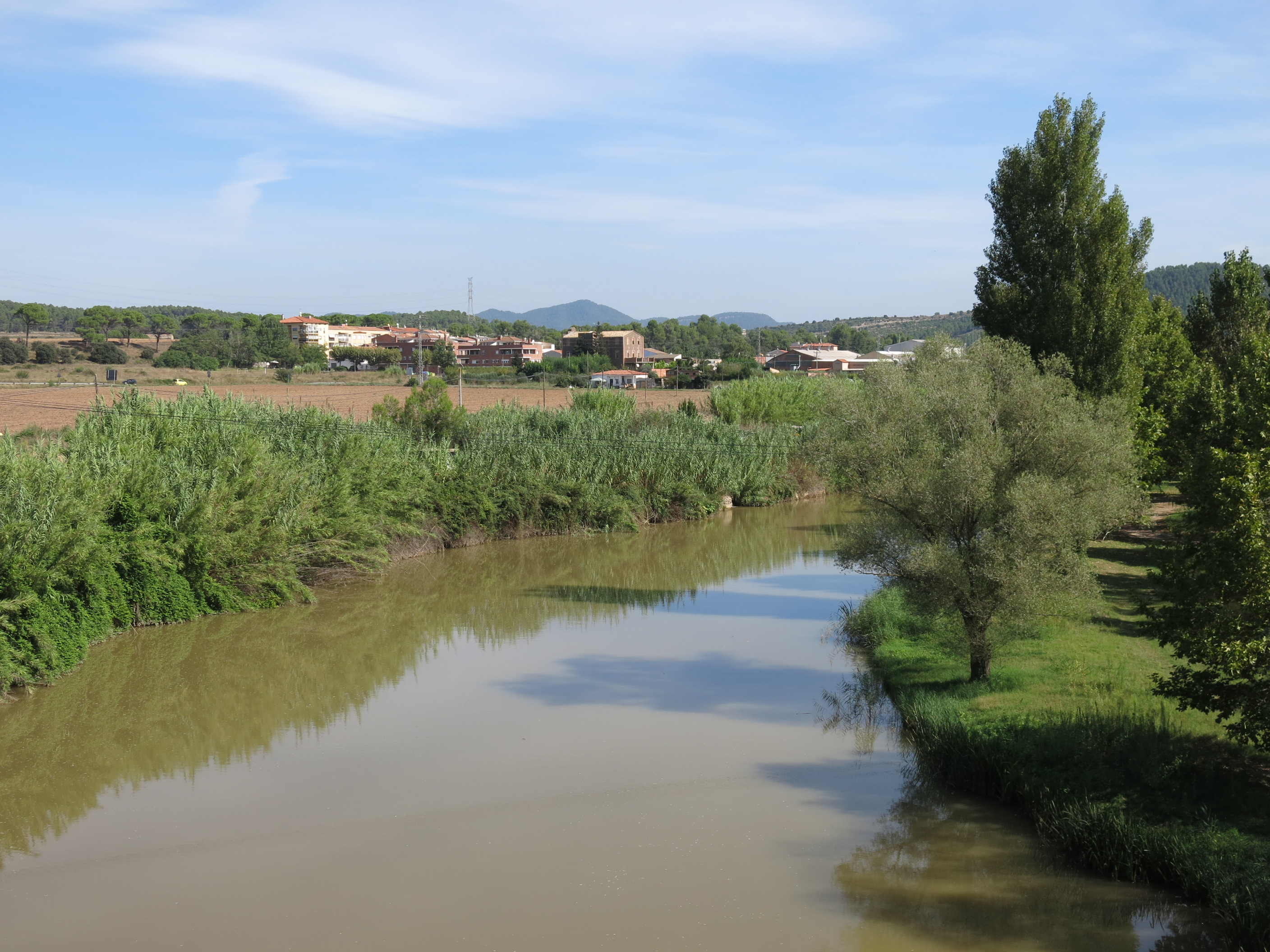
- View of Torroella de Baix from Navarcles

- Location within Spain Location within Catalonia Location within Province of Barcelona
- Coordinates: 41°45′30.1″N 1°53′45.3″E
- Country: Spain
- A. community: Catalunya
- Province: Barcelona
- Municipality: Sant Fruitós de Bages

Population (January 1, 2024)
  - Total: 428
- Time zone: UTC+01:00
- Postal code: 08272
- MCN: 08213000200
- Website: Official website

Torroella de Baix is a singular population entity in the municipality of Sant Fruitós de Bages, in Catalonia, Spain.

As of 2024 it has a population of 428 people.
