= Graugés =

- Singular population entity
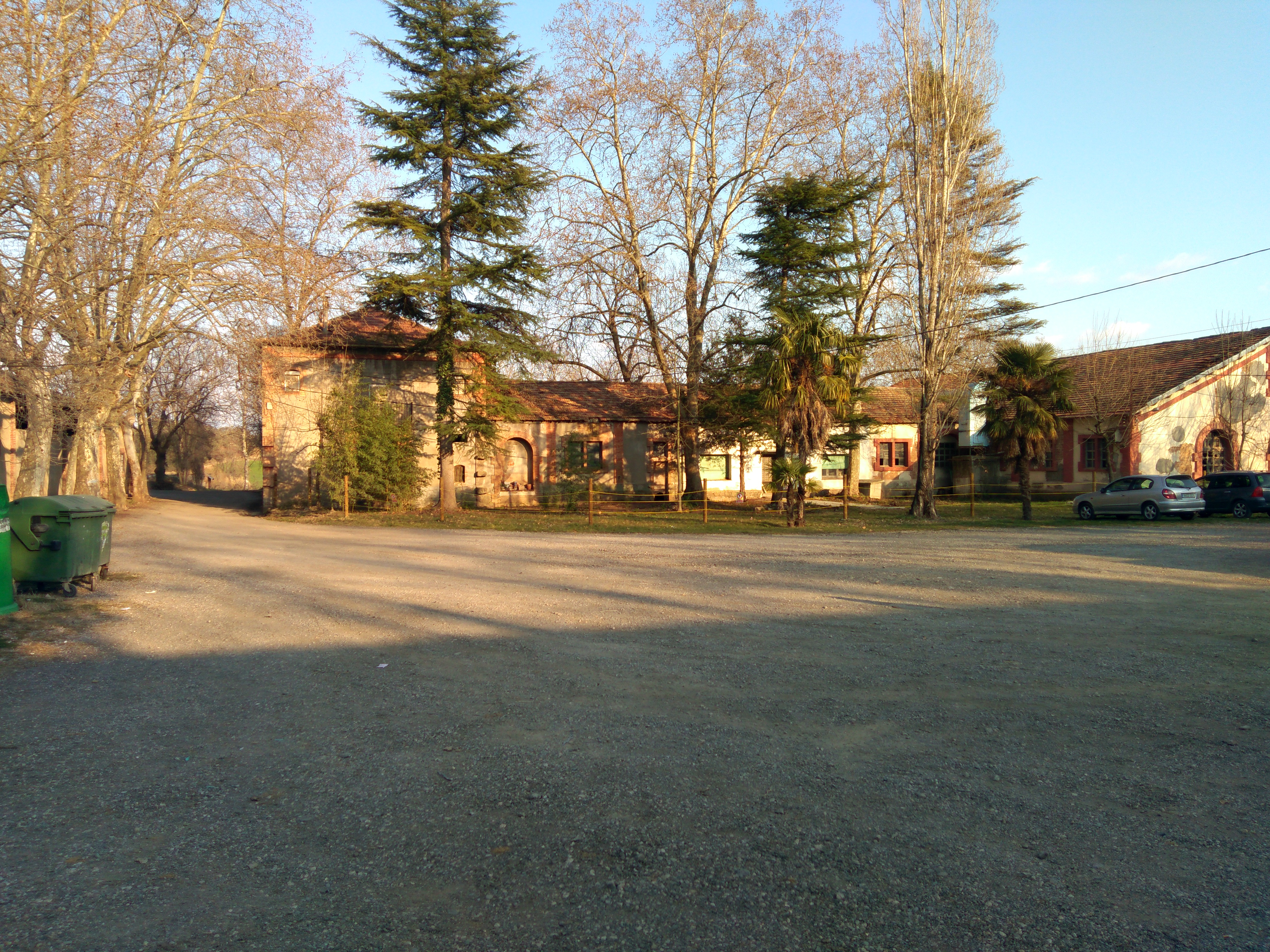
- View of Graugés

- Location within Spain Location within Catalonia Location within Province of Barcelona
- Coordinates: 42°03′52.1″N 1°50′34.6″E
- Country: Spain
- A. community: Catalunya
- Province: Barcelona
- Municipality: Avià

Population (January 1, 2024)
  - Total: 161
- Time zone: UTC+01:00
- Postal code: 08610
- MCN: 08011000300

Graugés is a singular population entity in the municipality of Avià, in Catalonia, Spain.

As of 2024 it has a population of 161 people.
