= Carrer de Dalt i Ca l'Esteve =

Singular population entity in Spain

- Singular population entity
- Location within Spain Location within Catalonia Location within Province of Barcelona
- Coordinates: 41°39′04.4″N 1°45′33.8″E
- Country: Spain
- A. community: Catalunya
- Province: Barcelona
- Comarca: Bages
- Municipality: Sant Salvador de Guardiola

Population (January 1, 2024)
  - Total: 389
- Time zone: UTC+01:00
- Postal code: 08253
- MCN: 08098000700

Carrer de Dalt i Ca l'Esteve is a singular population entity in the municipality of Sant Salvador de Guardiola, in Catalonia, Spain.

As of 2024 it has a population of 389 people.
