= Can Font =

- Singular population entity
- Location within Spain Location within Catalonia Location within Province of Barcelona
- Coordinates: 41°41′03.9″N 1°50′21.9″E
- Country: Spain
- A. community: Catalunya
- Province: Barcelona
- Municipality: Castellgalí

Population (January 1, 2024)
  - Total: 26
- Time zone: UTC+01:00
- Postal code: 08297
- MCN: 08061000300

Can Font is a singular population entity in the municipality of Castellgalí, in Catalonia, Spain.

As of 2024 it has a population of 26 people.
