= Vallhonesta =

- Singular population entity
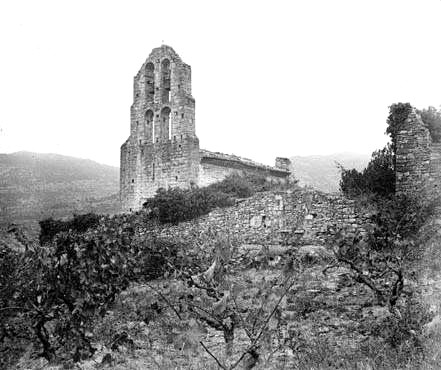
- Church of Sant Pere de Vallhonesta

- Location within Spain Location within Catalonia Location within Province of Barcelona
- Coordinates: 41°40′26.3″N 1°53′38.6″E
- Country: Spain
- A. community: Catalunya
- Province: Barcelona
- Municipality: Sant Vicenç de Castellet

Population (January 1, 2024)
  - Total: 11
- Time zone: UTC+01:00
- Postal code: 08295
- MCN: 08262000400

Vallhonesta is a singular population entity in the municipality of Sant Vicenç de Castellet, in Catalonia, Spain.

In 2023, it had 12 inhabitants. As of 2024 it has a population of 11 people.
