= El Pont de Cabrianes =

el Pont de Cabrianes
- Singular population entity
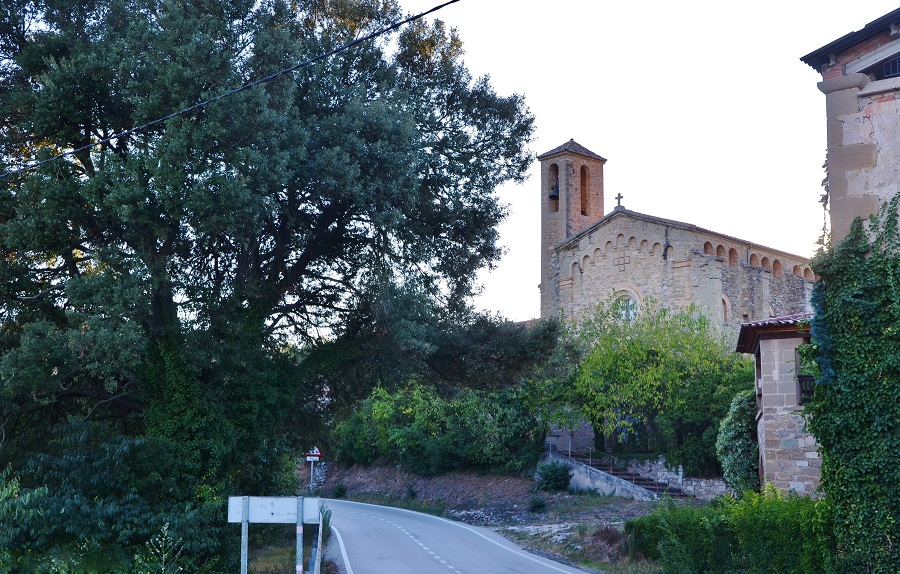
- Església del Pont de Cabrianes

- Location within Spain Location within Catalonia Location within Province of Barcelona
- Coordinates: 41°45′13.0″N 1°53′31.4″E
- Country: Spain
- A. community: Catalunya
- Province: Barcelona
- Municipality: Sant Fruitós de Bages

Population (January 1, 2024)
  - Total: 3
- Time zone: UTC+01:00
- Postal code: 08272
- MCN: 08213000600

el Pont de Cabrianes is a singular population entity in the municipality of Sant Fruitós de Bages, in Catalonia, Spain.

As of 2024 it has a population of 3 people.
