= La Fàbrica =

la Fàbrica
- Singular population entity
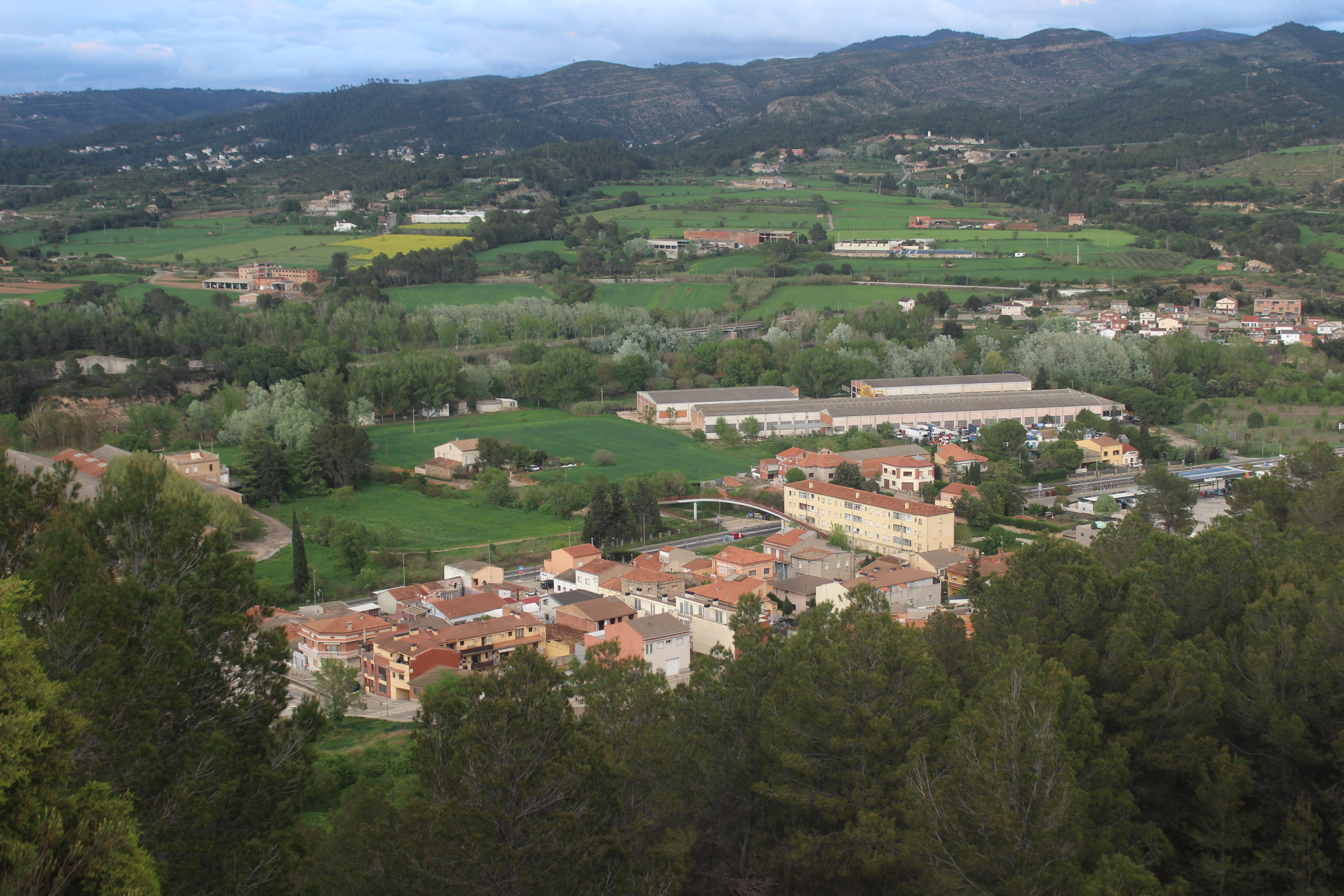
- View of la Fàbrica

- Location within Spain Location within Catalonia Location within Province of Barcelona
- Coordinates: 41°40′42.3″N 1°50′46.9″E
- Country: Spain
- A. community: Catalunya
- Province: Barcelona
- Municipality: Castellgalí

Population (January 1, 2024)
  - Total: 176
- Time zone: UTC+01:00
- Postal code: 08297
- MCN: 08061000100

la Fàbrica is a singular population entity in the municipality of Castellgalí, in Catalonia, Spain.

As of 2024 it has a population of 176 people.
