= Barri de la Creu =

- Singular population entity
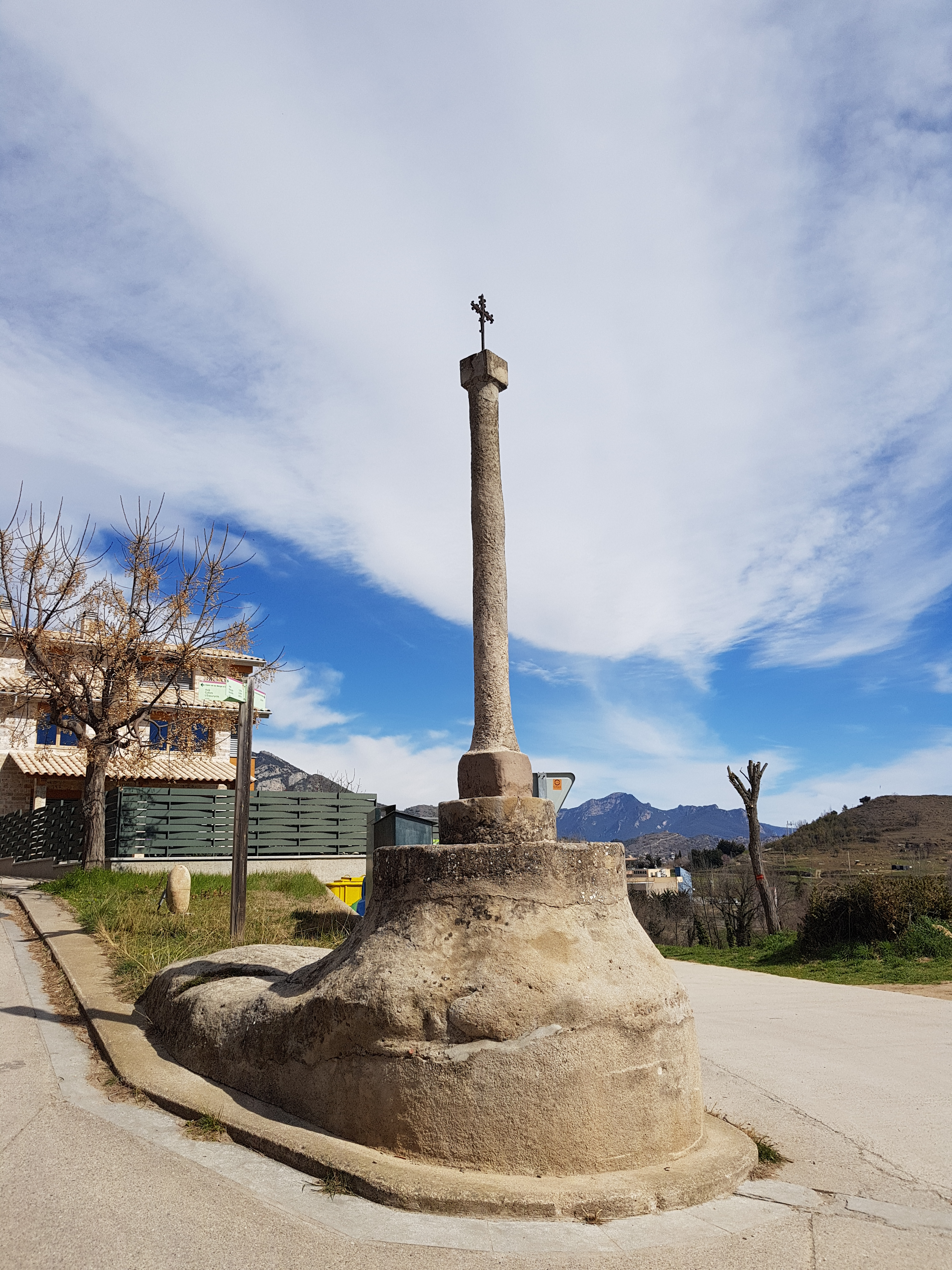
- Cross on the Barri de la Creu

- Location within Spain Location within Catalonia Location within Province of Barcelona
- Coordinates: 42°05′04.2″N 1°49′35.1″E
- Country: Spain
- A. community: Catalunya
- Province: Barcelona
- Municipality: Avià

Population (January 1, 2024)
  - Total: 113
- Time zone: UTC+01:00
- Postal code: 08610
- MCN: 08011000700

Barri de la Creu is a singular population entity in the municipality of Avià, in Catalonia, Spain.

As of 2024 it has a population of 113 people.
