= La Rosaleda, Sant Fruitós de Bages =

la Rosaleda
- Singular population entity
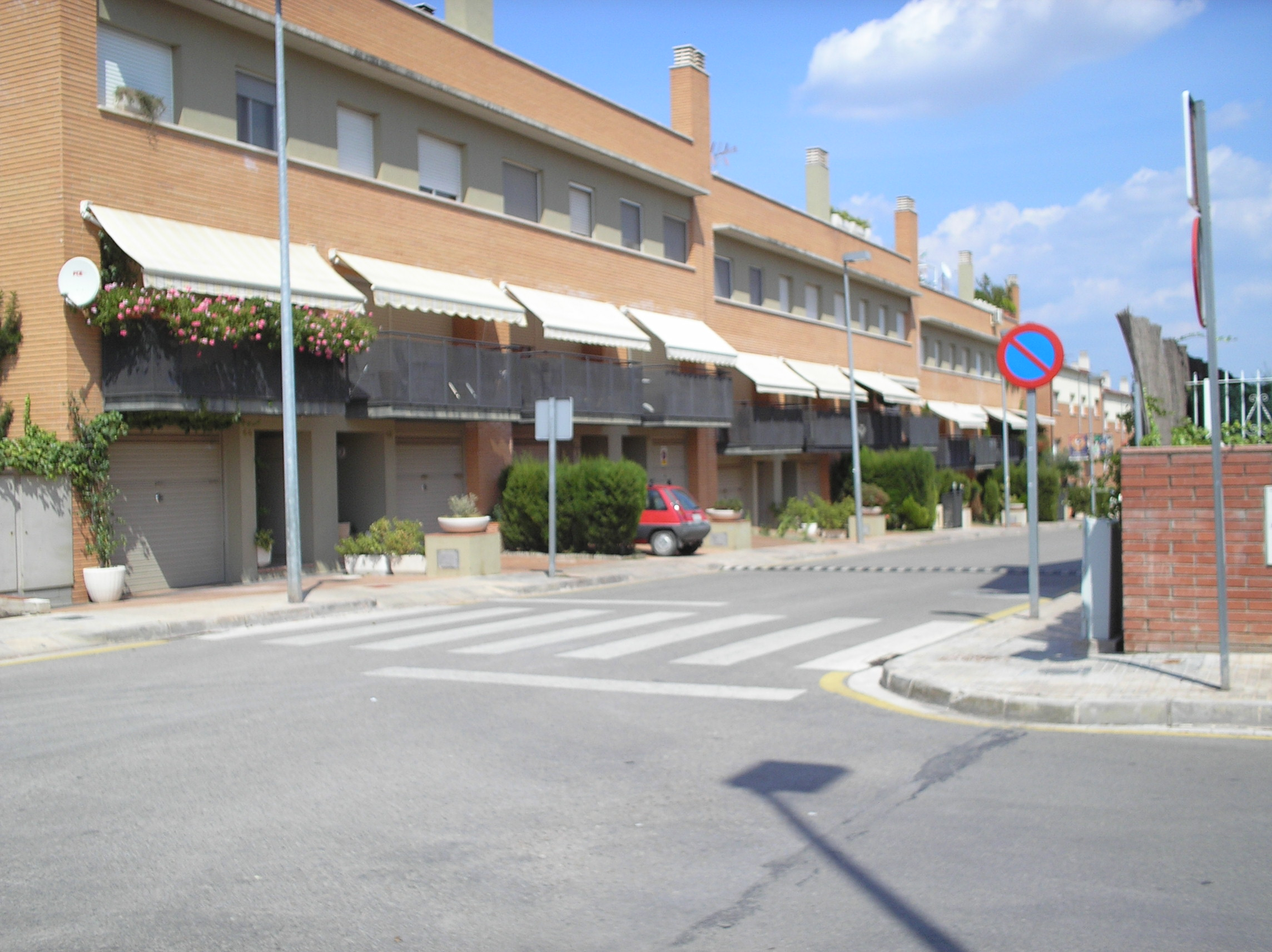
- Houses in la Rosaleda

- Location within Spain Location within Catalonia Location within Province of Barcelona
- Coordinates: 41°44′43.5″N 1°51′39.5″E
- Country: Spain
- A. community: Catalunya
- Province: Barcelona
- Municipality: Sant Fruitós de Bages

Population (January 1, 2024)
  - Total: 521
- Time zone: UTC+01:00
- Postal code: 08272
- MCN: 08213000100
- Website: Official website

la Rosaleda is a singular population entity in the municipality of Sant Fruitós de Bages, in Catalonia, Spain.

As of 2024 it has a population of 521 people.
