= El Mujal =

el Mujal
- Singular population entity
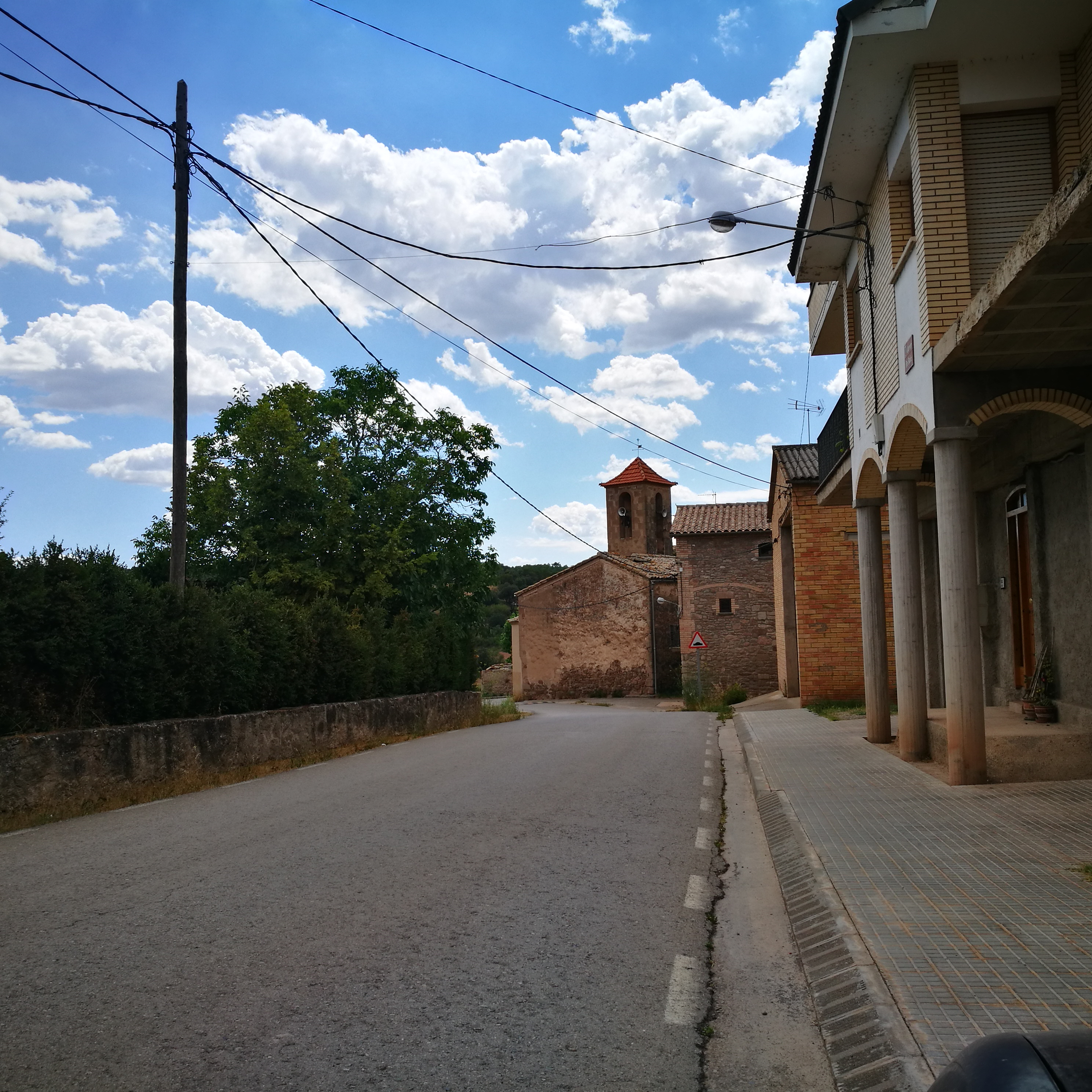
- Church of el Mujal

- Location within Spain Location within Catalonia Location within Province of Barcelona
- Coordinates: 41°53′26.9″N 1°51′16.6″E
- Country: Spain
- A. community: Catalunya
- Province: Barcelona
- Municipality: Navàs

Population (January 1, 2024)
  - Total: 61
- Time zone: UTC+01:00
- Postal code: 08670
- MCN: 08141000200
- Website: Official website

el Mujal is a singular population entity in the municipality of Navàs, in Catalonia, Spain.

As of 2024 it has a population of 61 people.
