= El Clot del Tufau =

el Clot del Tufau
- Singular population entity
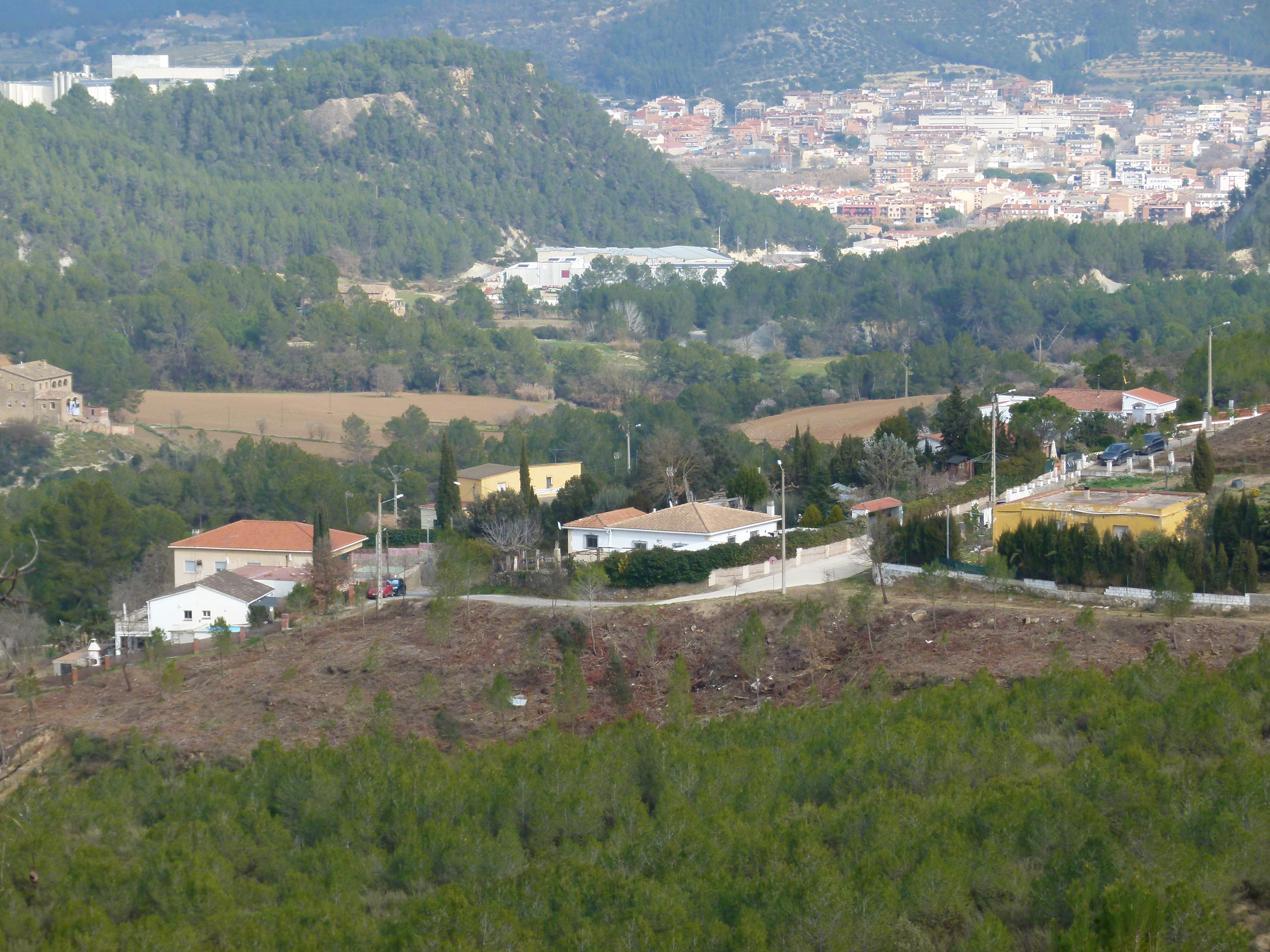
- View of el Clot del Tufau

- Location within Spain Location within Catalonia Location within Province of Barcelona
- Coordinates: 41°39′37.8″N 1°50′12.2″E
- Country: Spain
- A. community: Catalunya
- Province: Barcelona
- Municipality: Sant Vicenç de Castellet

Population (January 1, 2024)
  - Total: 48
- Time zone: UTC+01:00
- Postal code: 08295
- MCN: 08262000200

el Clot del Tufau is a singular population entity in the municipality of Sant Vicenç de Castellet, in Catalonia, Spain.

As of 2024 it has a population of 48 people.
