= Les Brucardes =

les Brucardes
- Singular population entity
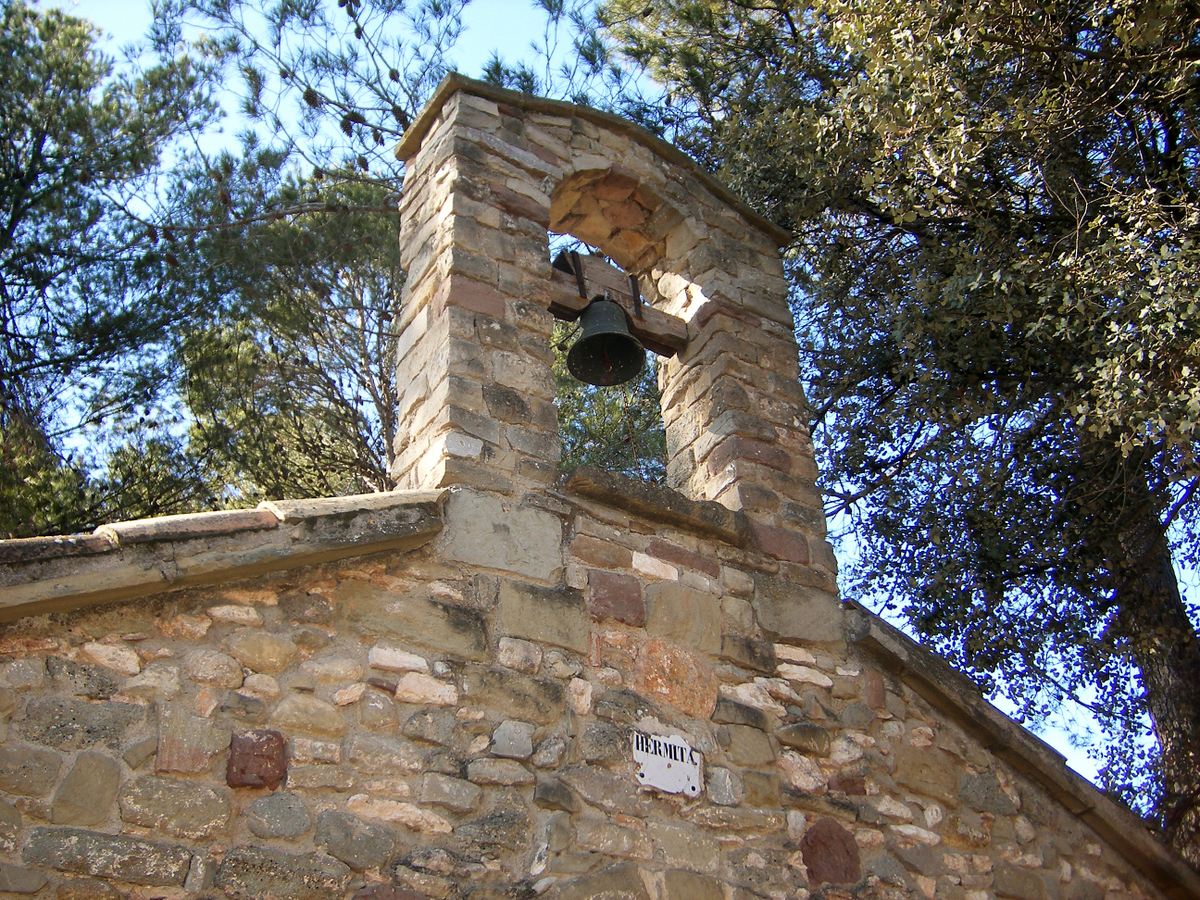
- Sant Sebastià de les Brucardes

- Location within Spain Location within Catalonia Location within Province of Barcelona
- Coordinates: 41°44′26.5″N 1°53′07.9″E
- Country: Spain
- A. community: Catalunya
- Province: Barcelona
- Municipality: Sant Fruitós de Bages

Population (January 1, 2024)
  - Total: 758
- Time zone: UTC+01:00
- Postal code: 08272
- MCN: 08213000400
- Website: Official website

les Brucardes is a singular population entity in the municipality of Sant Fruitós de Bages, in Catalonia, Spain.

As of 2024 it has a population of 758 people.
