= Set-rengs =

Singular population entity in Spain

- Singular population entity
- Location within Spain Location within Catalonia Location within Province of Barcelona
- Coordinates: 41°40′25.1″N 1°44′29.2″E
- Country: Spain
- A. community: Catalunya
- Province: Barcelona
- Comarca: Bages
- Municipality: Sant Salvador de Guardiola

Population (January 1, 2024)
  - Total: 10
- Time zone: UTC+01:00
- Postal code: 08253
- MCN: 08098001100
- Website: Official website

Set-rengs is a singular population entity in the municipality of Sant Salvador de Guardiola, in Catalonia, Spain.

As of the January 2024 census, it has a population of 10 people.
