= Raval del Parrot =

- Singular population entity
- Location within Spain Location within Catalonia Location within Province of Barcelona
- Coordinates: 41°40′00.3″N 1°46′24.5″E
- Country: Spain
- A. community: Catalunya
- Province: Barcelona
- Comarca: Bages
- Municipality: Sant Salvador de Guardiola

Population (January 1, 2024)
  - Total: 27
- Time zone: UTC+01:00
- Postal code: 08253
- MCN: 08098000200

Raval del Parrot is a singular population entity in the municipality of Sant Salvador de Guardiola, in Catalonia, Spain.

As of 2024 it has a population of 27 people.
