= Els Torrents, Castellgalí =

els Torrents
- Singular population entity
- Location within Spain Location within Catalonia Location within Province of Barcelona
- Coordinates: 41°41′31.9″N 1°50′11.3″E
- Country: Spain
- A. community: Catalunya
- Province: Barcelona
- Municipality: Castellgalí

Population (January 1, 2024)
  - Total: 30
- Time zone: UTC+01:00
- Postal code: 08297
- MCN: 08061000700

els Torrents is a singular population entity in the municipality of Castellgalí, in Catalonia, Spain.

As of 2024 it has a population of 30 people.
