= El Calbet =

Singular population entity in Spain

el Calbet
- Singular population entity
- Location within Spain Location within Catalonia Location within Province of Barcelona
- Coordinates: 41°41′03.9″N 1°46′49.8″E
- Country: Spain
- A. community: Catalunya
- Province: Barcelona
- Comarca: Bages
- Municipality: Sant Salvador de Guardiola

Population (January 1, 2024)
  - Total: 1,512
- Time zone: UTC+01:00
- Postal code: 08253
- MCN: 08098000400

el Calbet is a singular population entity in the municipality of Sant Salvador de Guardiola, in Catalonia, Spain.

As of 2024 it has a population of 1,512 people.
