= Sant Salvador de Torroella =

- Singular population entity
- Location within Spain Location within Catalonia Location within Province of Barcelona
- Coordinates: 41°52′11.3″N 1°42′52.8″E
- Country: Spain
- A. community: Catalunya
- Province: Barcelona
- Municipality: Navàs

Population (January 1, 2024)
  - Total: 20
- Time zone: UTC+01:00
- Postal code: 08269
- MCN: 08141000600
- Website: Official website

Sant Salvador de Torroella is a singular population entity in the municipality of Navàs, in Catalonia, Spain.

As of 2024 it has a population of 20 people.
