= Pineda de Bages =

- Singular population entity
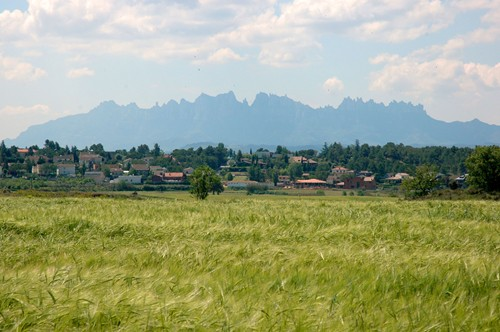
- View of Pineda de Bages

- Location within Spain Location within Catalonia Location within Province of Barcelona
- Coordinates: 41°45′34.6″N 1°50′07.5″E
- Country: Spain
- A. community: Catalunya
- Province: Barcelona
- Municipality: Sant Fruitós de Bages

Population (January 1, 2024)
  - Total: 1,019
- Time zone: UTC+01:00
- Postal code: 08272
- MCN: 08213000500
- Website: Official website

Pineda de Bages is a singular population entity in the municipality of Sant Fruitós de Bages, in Catalonia, Spain.

As of 2024 it has a population of 1,019 people.
