= La Vall d'Urbisol =

Singular population entity in Spain

la Vall d'Urbisol
- Singular population entity
- Location within Spain Location within Catalonia Location within Province of Barcelona
- Coordinates: 41°48′08.6″N 2°01′13.3″E
- Country: Spain
- A. community: Catalunya
- Province: Barcelona
- Municipality: Avinyó

Population (January 1, 2024)
  - Total: 22
- Time zone: UTC+01:00
- Postal code: 08279
- MCN: 08012000400

la Vall d'Urbisol is a singular population entity in the municipality of Avinyó, in Catalonia, Spain.

As of 2024 it has a population of 22 people.

== Zoning ==
A 2017 municipal plenary session stated that the locality is inelligible for redevelopment, and that the houses in the area can be maintained without any opportunity for additional construction or modification.
