= Obiols =

- Singular population entity
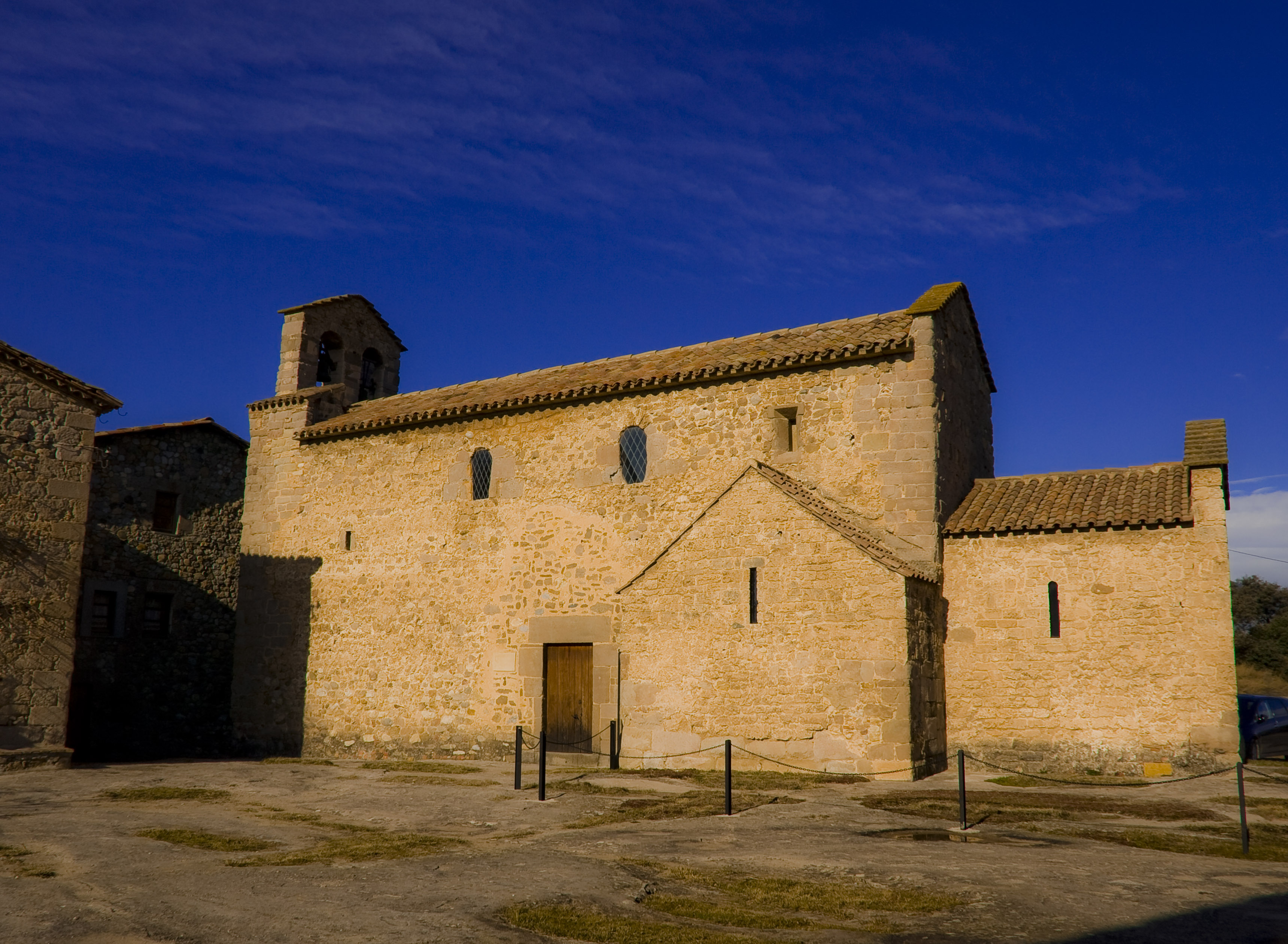
- Sant Vicenç d'Obiols

- Location within Spain Location within Catalonia Location within Province of Barcelona
- Coordinates: 42°03′40.0″N 1°51′59.7″E
- Country: Spain
- A. community: Catalunya
- Province: Barcelona
- Municipality: Avià

Population (January 1, 2024)
  - Total: 18
- Time zone: UTC+01:00
- Postal code: 08610
- MCN: 08011000400

Obiols is a singular population entity in the municipality of Avià, in Catalonia, Spain.

As of 2024 it has a population of 18 people.
