= La Torre del Breny =

la Torre del Breny
- Singular population entity
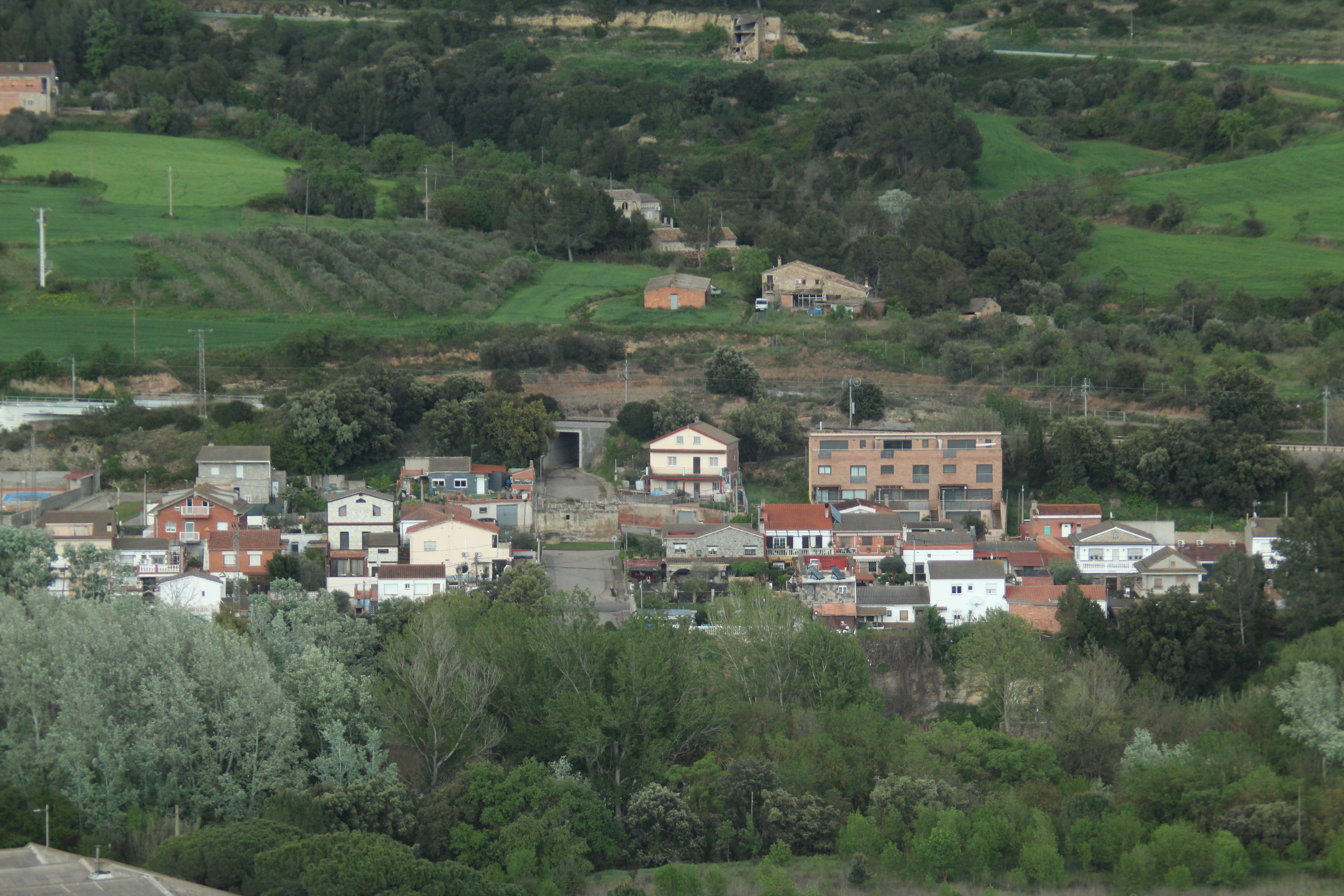
- View of la Torre del Breny

- Location within Spain Location within Catalonia Location within Province of Barcelona
- Coordinates: 41°40′40.6″N 1°51′16.6″E
- Country: Spain
- A. community: Catalunya
- Province: Barcelona
- Municipality: Castellgalí

Population (January 1, 2024)
  - Total: 102
- Time zone: UTC+01:00
- Postal code: 08297
- MCN: 08061001100

la Torre del Breny is a singular population entity in the municipality of Castellgalí, in Catalonia, Spain.

As of 2024 it has a population of 102 people.
