= Molí del Castell =

- Singular population entity
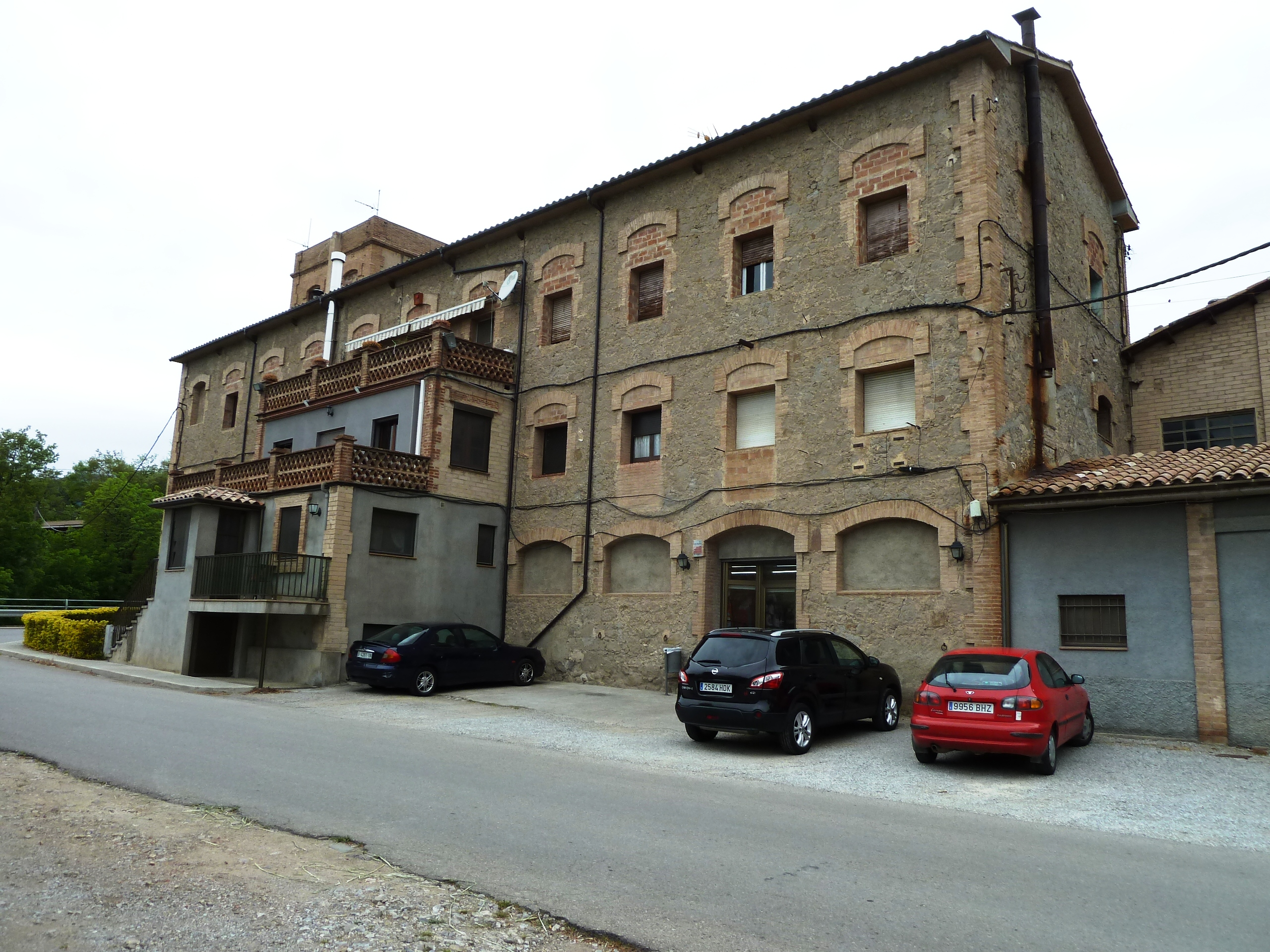
- Molí del Castell

- Location within Spain Location within Catalonia Location within Province of Barcelona
- Coordinates: 42°05′01.0″N 1°49′54.6″E
- Country: Spain
- A. community: Catalunya
- Province: Barcelona
- Municipality: Avià

Population (January 1, 2024)
  - Total: 45
- Time zone: UTC+01:00
- Postal code: 08610
- MCN: 08011000800

Molí del Castell is a singular population entity in the municipality of Avià, in Catalonia, Spain.

As of 2024 it has a population of 45 people.
