= Avinyó =

- Municipality
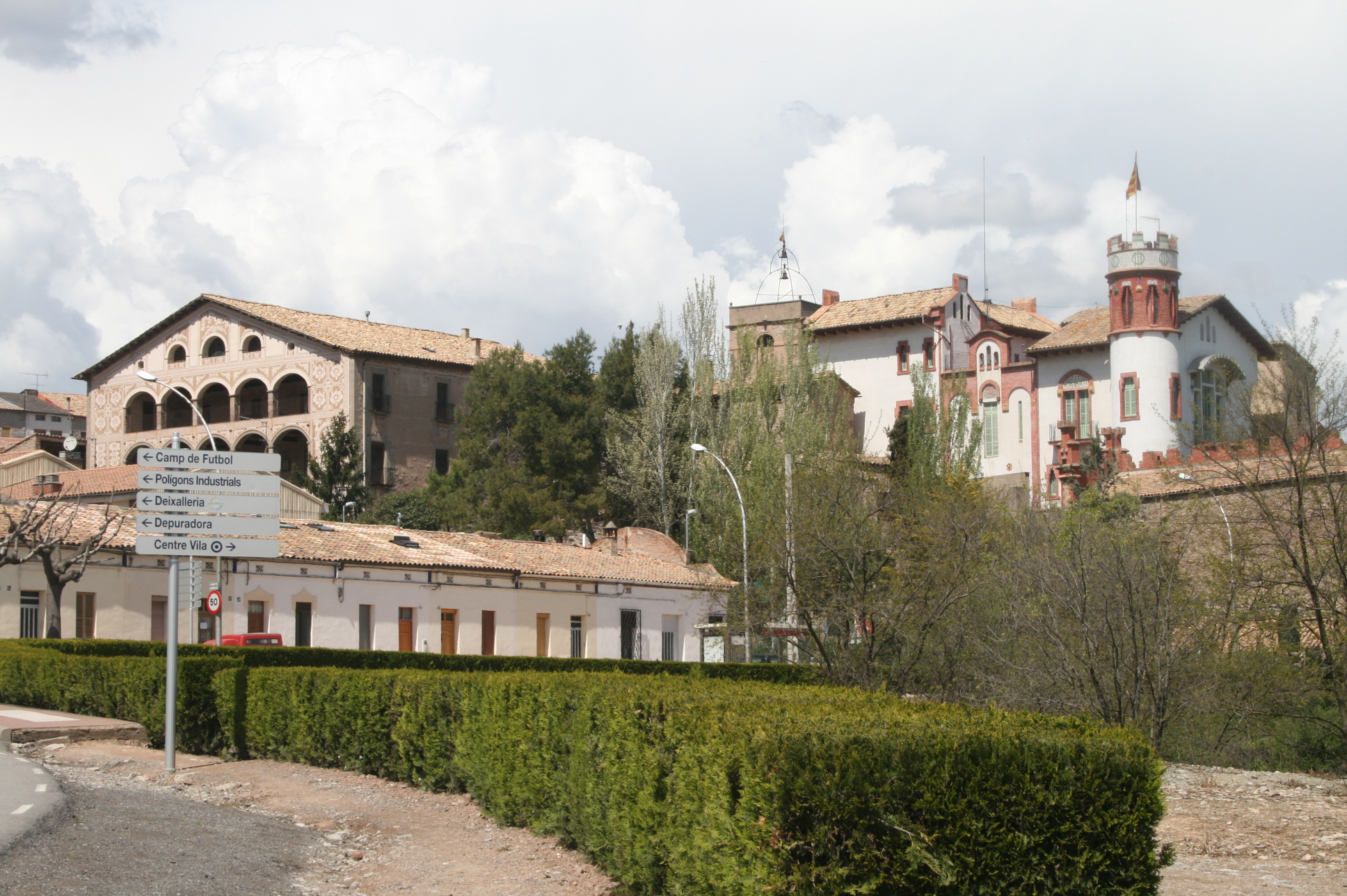
- Old centre of Avinyó

- Flag Coat of arms

- Location in Catalonia Avinyó (Spain)
- Coordinates: 41°51′47″N 1°58′15″E
- Country: Spain
- Community: Catalonia
- Province: Barcelona
- Comarca: Bages

Government
  - Mayor: Sergi Grau Torrent (2024)

Area
  - Total: 63.2 km^{2} (24.4 sq mi)

Population (2025-01-01)
  - Total: 2,322
  - Density: 36.7/km^{2} (95.2/sq mi)
- Website: www.avinyo.cat

Avinyó (Catalan pronunciation: [əβiˈɲo]) is a municipality in Catalonia, Spain, located in the comarca of Bages, province of Barcelona. Its population in 2018 was estimated at 2,250 residents. Its current mayor is Sergi Grau Torrent, elected in 2023.
