= Avià =

- Municipality
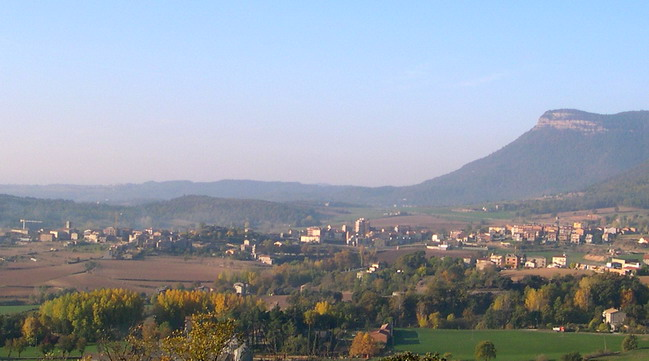
- Avià

- Flag Coat of arms

- Location in Catalonia Avià (Spain)
- Coordinates: 42°04′42.00″N 1°49′12.00″E
- Country: Spain
- Community: Catalonia
- Province: Barcelona
- Comarca: Berguedà

Government
  - Mayor: Patrocini Canal Burniol (2015) (Som Avià)

Area
  - Total: 27.24 km^{2} (10.52 sq mi)
- Elevation: 677 m (2,221 ft)

Population (2025-01-01)
  - Total: 2,267
  - Density: 83.22/km^{2} (215.5/sq mi)
- Demonym(s): Avianès, avianesa
- Postal code: 08610
- Website: avia.cat

Avià (Catalan pronunciation: [əβiˈa]) is a municipality in the comarca of Berguedà, in Catalonia. Its population in 2007 was 2108 inhabitants.

The municipality is made up of three towns: Avià, Graugés and La Plana. Its economical activity is based on agriculture and textile industry. In 2010 the population of the town was 2223.

The mayor is Patrocini Canal Burniol.

== Landmarks ==
- Church of Sant Vicenç d'Obiols. Pre-Romanesque
- Church of Santa Maria d'Avià. Romanesque
- Serrat dels Lladres (Avià).
- Serradet del Bullidor.
- Sant Martí d'Avià, the parish church in Plaça del Ateneu, also known as Plaça del Secretari.
