= Sant Vicenç de Castellet =

- Municipality
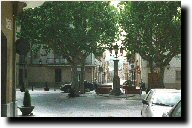

- Flag Coat of arms

- Location in Bages county

- Location within Catalonia Location within Spain
- Coordinates: 41°40′4″N 1°51′48″E
- Sovereign state: Spain
- Community: Catalonia
- Region: Centre
- County: Bages
- Province: Barcelona

Government
  - Mayor: Daniel Mauriz i Vidal (2023) (JxC)

Area
  - Total: 17.1 km^{2} (6.6 sq mi)
- Elevation: 176 m (577 ft)

Population (2025-01-01)
  - Total: 10,164
  - Density: 594/km^{2} (1,540/sq mi)
- Demonym(s): Santvicentí, santvicentina
- Website: svc.cat

Sant Vicenç de Castellet (Catalan: [sam biˈsɛnz ðə kəs.təˈʎɛt]) is a municipality in Bages county in Catalonia, Spain. It is situated near the confluence of the Llobregat river and the Cardener river. The two railway stations, close to each other, serve the FGC line R5 between Barcelona and Manresa, and the Renfe line between Barcelona and Zaragoza via Manresa and Lleida, served by Rodalies lines R4 and R12. The C-1411 road links the municipality with Martorell and Manresa.

The ruins of both the Castellet castle and of a Roman tomb (third century, known locally as la Torre del Breny) are visible.

== Demography ==
1900	1930	1950	1970	1986	2007
1429	3094	4008	6831	7625	8096
