= Navàs =

- Municipality
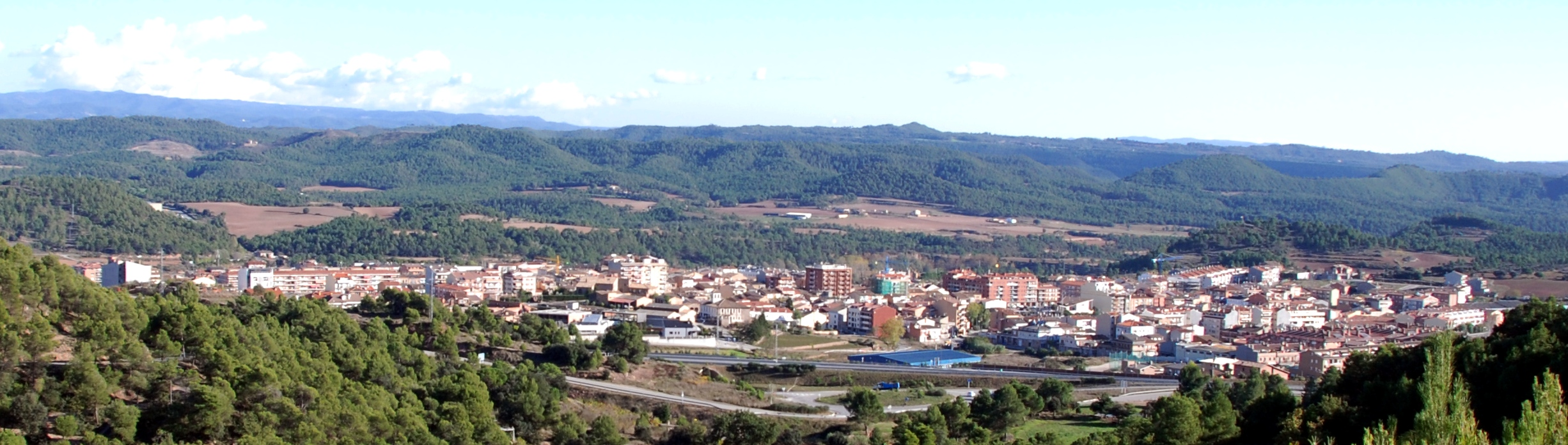
- Navàs

- Coat of arms

- Location in Catalonia Navàs (Spain)
- Coordinates: 41°54′0″N 1°53′11″E
- Country: Spain
- Community: Catalonia
- Province: Barcelona
- Comarca: Bages

Government
  - Mayor: Jaume Casals Ció (2015)

Area
  - Total: 80.6 km^{2} (31.1 sq mi)

Population (2025-01-01)
  - Total: 6,238
  - Density: 77.4/km^{2} (200/sq mi)
- Website: www.navas.cat

Navàs (Catalan pronunciation: [nəˈβas]) is a town and municipality in the province of Barcelona in Catalonia, Spain. The municipality covers an area of 80.6 square kilometres (31.1 sq mi) and the population in 2014 was 6,117.
