= Sant Fruitós de Bages =

- Municipality
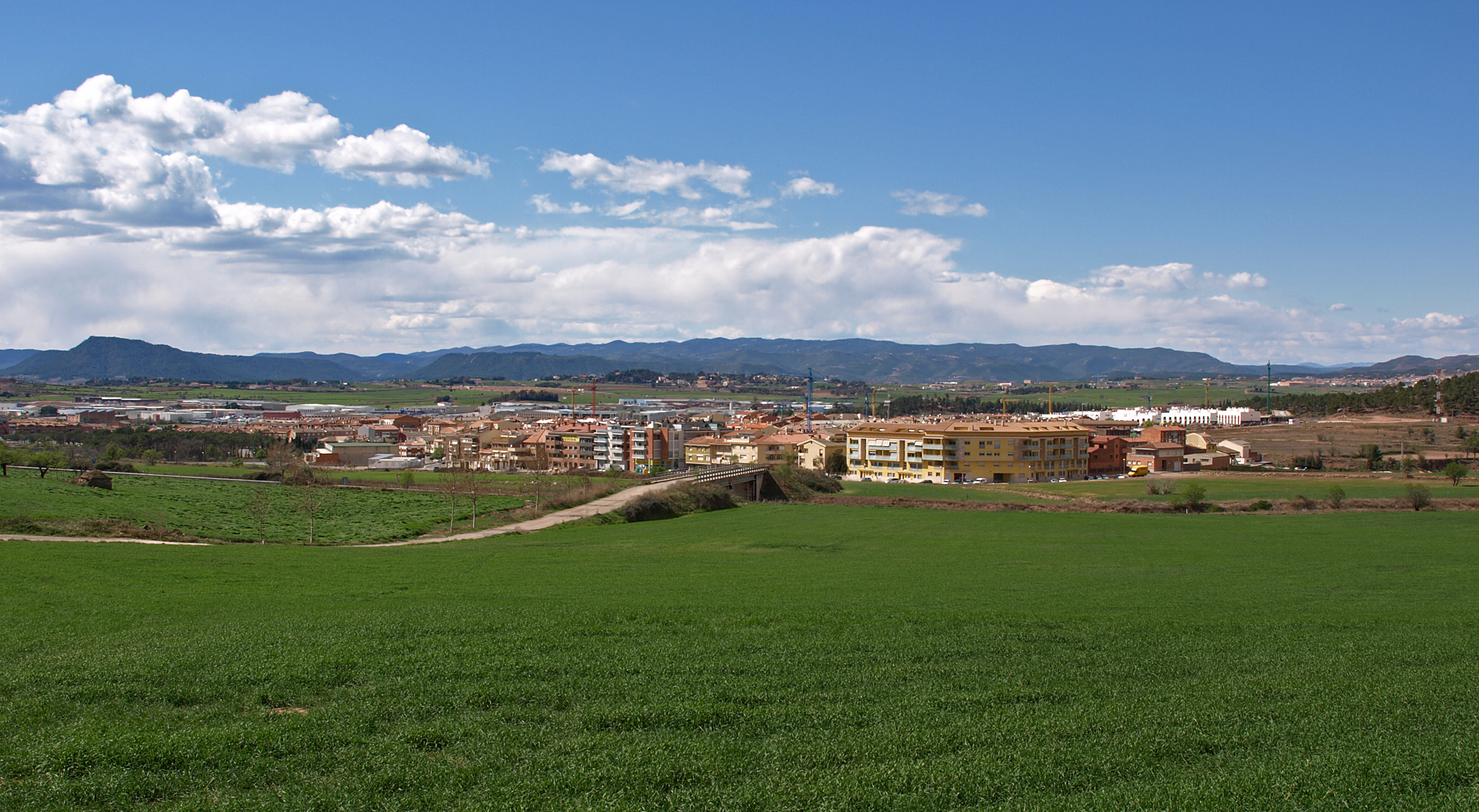

- Flag Coat of arms

- Location in Catalonia Sant Fruitós de Bages (Spain)
- Coordinates: 41.752°N 1.8745°E
- Country: Spain
- Community: Catalonia
- Province: Barcelona
- Comarca: Bages

Government
  - Mayor: Joan Carles Batanés Subirana (2025)

Area
  - Total: 22.2 km^{2} (8.6 sq mi)
- Elevation: 247 m (810 ft)

Population (2025-01-01)
  - Total: 9,333
  - Density: 420/km^{2} (1,090/sq mi)
- Postal code: 08272
- Website: www.santfruitos.cat

Sant Fruitós de Bages (Catalan pronunciation: [ˈsaɱ fɾujˈtoz ðə ˈβaʒəs]) is a municipality in the comarca of Bages in Catalonia, Spain. The monastery of Sant Benet de Bages is situated here.

The historical centre of the town maintains its medieval character, with houses around the church forming what is called a "sagrera".
