= Castellgalí =

- Municipality
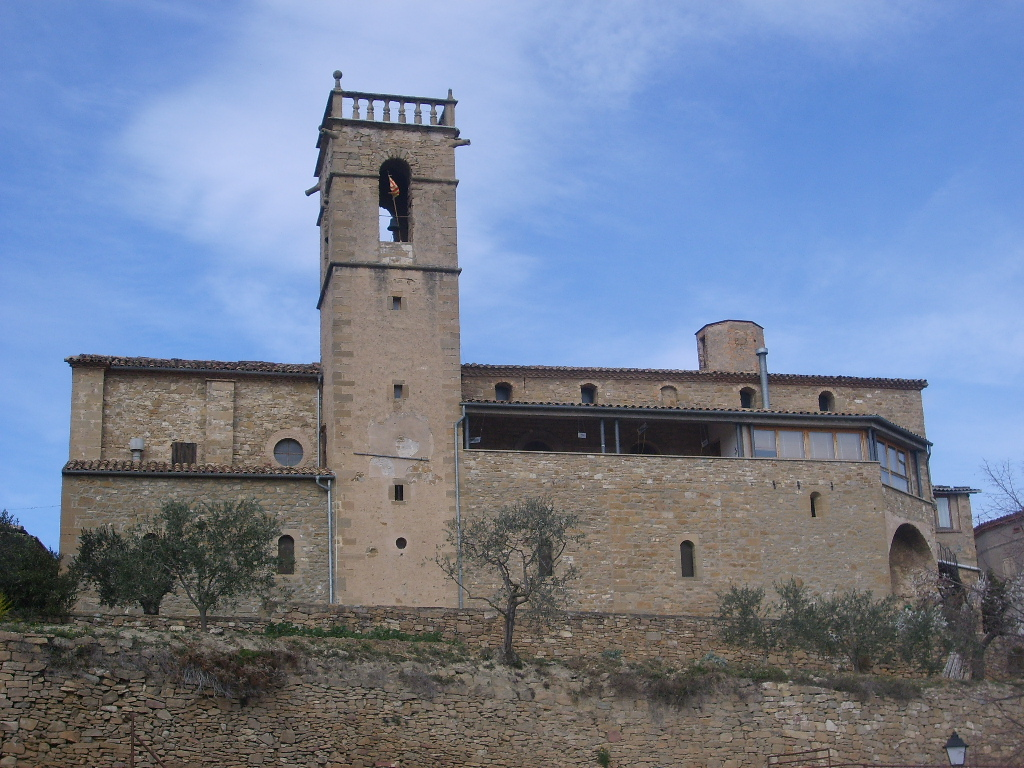

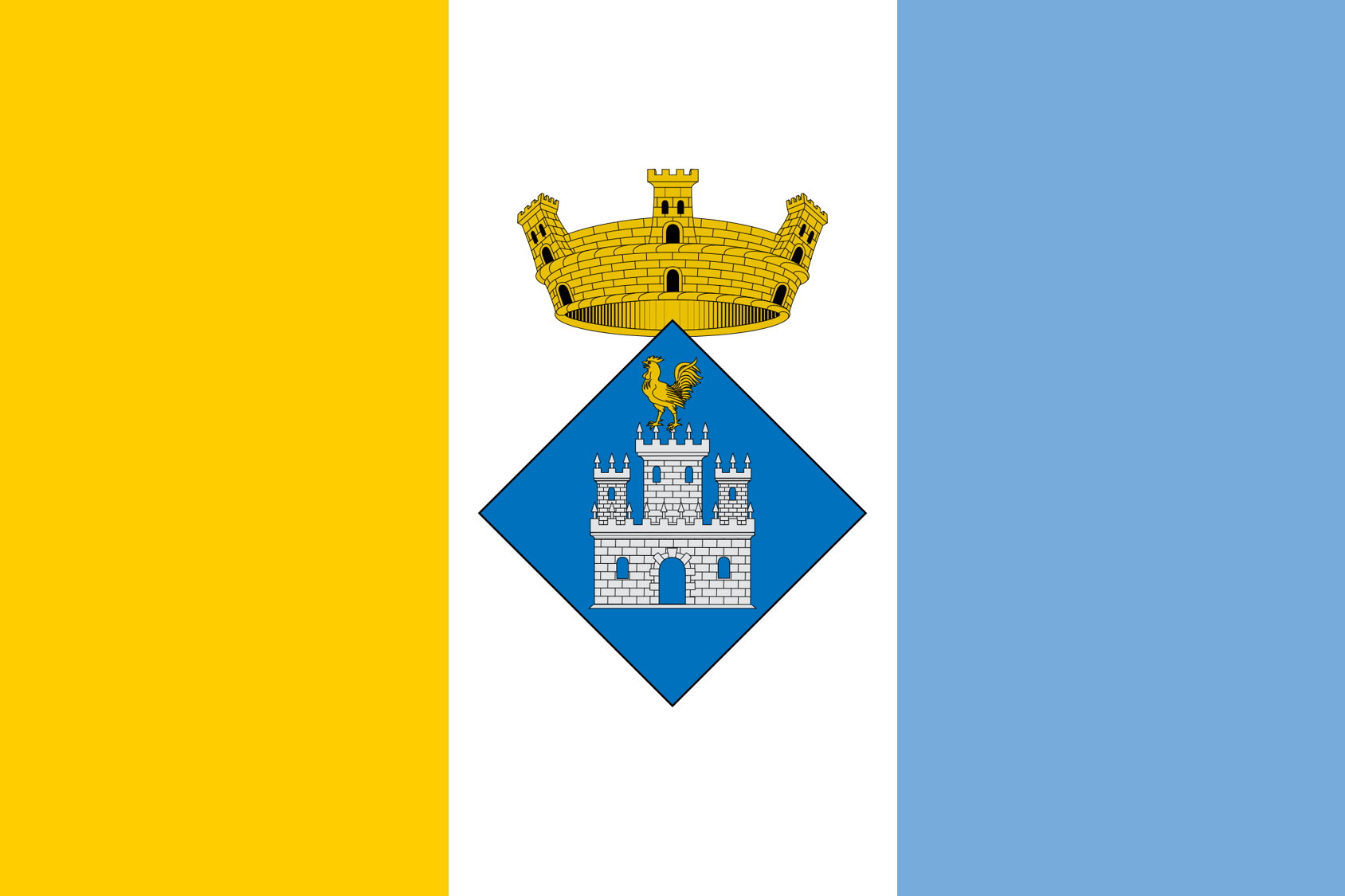
- Flag Coat of arms

- Location in Catalonia Castellgalí (Spain)
- Coordinates: 41.673°N 1.838°E
- Country: Spain
- Community: Catalonia
- Province: Barcelona
- Comarca: Bages

Government
  - Mayor: Cristòfol Gimeno Iglesias (2015)

Area
  - Total: 17.2 km^{2} (6.6 sq mi)
- Elevation: 266 m (873 ft)

Population (2025-01-01)
  - Total: 2,413
  - Density: 140/km^{2} (363/sq mi)
- Demonym(s): Castellgalí, castellgalina
- Website: www.castellgali.cat

Castellgalí (Catalan pronunciation: [kəsˌteʎ.ɣəˈli]) is a municipality in the south of the region of Bages, Catalonia, where the Cardener and Llobregat rivers meet, and contains the Boades archaeological site Cultural Asset of National Interest and the Torre del Breny, one of the most outstanding ancient Greek sites in Catalonia.

== History ==
=== Iberian period ===
The first signs of population were found in Boades, which was initially an Iberian settlement between the 6th and 1st centuries BC. An Iberian settlement existed at Puig del Castel between the 4th and 1st centuries BC. The location of the settlement of Boades between the Llobregat and Cardener rivers allowed its inhabitants to farm successfully on the fertile land, which led to a surplus and export of cereals. There were also olive trees and vineyards. The terrain was also favorable for hunting. The settlement was located in the area of Cal Roc near a meander of the Llobregat.

=== Roman period ===
With the arrival of the Romans, the Iberian settlement of Puig del Castell was progressively abandoned, while the settlement of Boades was reconfigured as a Roman village and acted as a strategic commercial centre since it was located on the trade routes coming from the Llobregat and Cardener rivers. Several important funerary monuments were also erected during this period, such as the Torre del Breny and the Roman tomb of Boades. The Breny tower was a monumental Roman sepulchre in the form of a temple, partly dismantled in 1870 to allow its stones to be used for a nearby dam. The Roman tomb at Boades, on the other hand, is located about 100 metres south of the Roman villa and was built during the 3rd century. It is considered a prototype of Roman funerary practices in Catalonia. Material extracted from archaeological excavations in the area is currently housed in the Manresa regional museum.

=== Middle Ages ===
The beginnings of the village coincide with those of its castle. A document from 867 mentions the Castelo de Galindo (Galindo Castle), attesting to the origin of the place's name. Little is known about the history of this castle, now in ruins. The first lords of the castle and the area were the Galí family. In 1178, the castle was sold, along with its lordship, to King Alfonso II of Aragon by Sibila, who was most probably a descendant of the Galí lineage. After the purchase, King Alfonso I handed it over to feudatories. During the period in which Castellgalí was a royal property, it was governed by castlans, vassals of the king. They took the name Castellgalí as their surname, thus inaugurating a new dynasty. At the end of this period, the Black Death affected Castellgalí, leaving many farmhouses empty and causing the death of the last castlans: Berenguer de Castellgalí, and shortly afterwards his wife Guilleuma de Rocafort I Castellet. In 1350, Peter the Ceremonious sold it to Bernat Torres for 8,000 sous. The latter's son, Dalmau Torres, sold it in 1413 to Luis de Rajadell, the younger brother of the Lord of Rajadell. At the beginning of the Catalan Civil War, the lord of Castellgalí, Manel de Rajadell, left the village because he was a supporter of Juan II. Thus the lordship was temporarily ceded to the monastery of Montserrat. It is believed that the castle was destroyed during this war, between 1462 and 1472.

=== Modern times ===
In the 18th century there was a great expansion of vine cultivation due to demographic expansion and the creation of the rabassa morta rental contract (until the death of the vineyards), which allowed Catellgalí to consolidate its nucleus. It was during this period that the old quarter acquired the urban configuration that still remains today, a fact that can be seen by looking at the years engraved on the lintels of the houses in the village, where in addition to the year of construction of the house, you can sometimes see the engravings that announced the services offered (a horseshoe, a loaf of bread and a knife...), as well as in the popular names given to the houses (such as Cal Ferrer, Casa del Herrero, the blacksmith's house). The old quarter was born around the royal road, the inn and the church. When the constitution of 1812 eliminated feudal duties, its last feudal lords were the Amigants, Marquises of Fonollar. The Despujol, Marquises of Palmerola, were the last noble family to buy the Amigant properties.

=== Contemporary age ===
The convulsive 19th century also marked Castellgalí, from the war of independence through the three Carlist wars, but it was also the century when the new cemetery was created (1892), the church was expanded (1897), the railway arrived (1859) and so did a telegraph antenna (1887). In this period of change and conflict, when manorial rights were extinguished, the last Spanish colonies were lost and constant wars ravaged the country, Castellgalí was considered a safe place, a refuge for the troops. It was a place of refuge for the Sometents against the French, Carlist and Liberal troops, and was a place of passage for all of them. In this century, the first factories were set up (1816 Barrera textile mill, 1860 Cots, 1896 Sant Jaume and 1898 Carbons Elèctrics) that would shape the Castellgalí of the 20th century.

The industrialisation of Castellgalí, which began in the 19th century, meant that the population grew until the end of the 1970s, except during the years of the Civil War. This conflict ravaged the population, and was felt in the loss of movable heritage, mainly ecclesiastical, such as the destruction of the 17th century altarpieces of the church of San Miguel and Santa Margarita, the silver urns from the same century, with the mortal remains of Saint Honestus and San Repelión or the destruction of the figure of San Miguel.

The population decreased until the mid-1990s, when the population began to grow to its present-day levels. It is also worth mentioning the birth of the residential area of Mas Planoi, in four zones. An area of single-family houses took its name from the farmhouse that has been there since at least the 15th century. At present, it continues to expand with the recent urbanisation of Ca l'Enric de Calafell in 2022.

== Places of interest ==
=== The confluence of the Cardener and Lobregat rivers ===
The place where the waters of the Cardener and Llobregat rivers meet at a large river area where riverside vegetation, especially poplars, grows majestically. The relative tranquillity of the place makes bird-watching possible in both of the migration seasons and in the wintering and nesting periods. In the cold months, some migrating ducks such as the common shoveler or the grunting duck can be found there, but it is easier to see the great cormorant. Grey herons and kingfishers can be found all year round.

=== Boades archaeological site and Torre del Breny ===
Salvador Ginesta tells us that the word Breny comes from either a misspelling of Elbreny, itself derived from the personal name Elderind; a toponym about stones and undergrowth; or a Gaulish term related to a chieftain or mountain.

Also known as the Tower of the Demons, Torre del Breny was mutilated in the Middle Ages when a farmhouse was built next to it: a door was opened, a window was opened and holes were made for the beams. It is a tomb in the form of a tower, whose base is still preserved today. It is of solid construction with its sides oriented to the four cardinal points. On the outside and at the top its mouldings and details are quite deteriorated. Inside two rectangular chambers are covered by two barrel vaults. The apparatus is quite regular, made up of large, well-cut ashlars of grey sandstone, dry-jointed and elongated in shape.

From drawings made by Laborde before its destruction, we can get an idea of what it originally looked like. It had a base (conditiorium) measuring 10x10.5 m, 3 m high; externally it had mouldings and other details as decorative elements; internally it was divided into two rooms and covered with a barrel vault. Above the base was the cell, which was probably also covered with a barrel vault. The upper part was surmounted by an ornamental frieze, above which was a cornice on which the slopes of the roof rested. The frieze was decorated with sculptural reliefs: a lion on either side of a nude female figure. On the other hand, E. Hübner and J. Gudi found a graffiti or inscription engraved on an ashlar that Marc Mayer believes must read: V VILGELMO QUE, which could date from the 10th-11th centuries and could correspond to a certain Wilgemus. Different researchers think that it would refer to the owner of the area where the building was located, but after the construction of the building.

Excedra In the neighbourhood of Boadas we can see this chamber with an apsidal semicircular floor plan, partially standing behind the Vilaseca and Cadevall farmhouses, next to the road that leads to the Carbures factory. The facing of the wall is made up of ashlars of natural stone from the area, of medium and small sizes, which can be identified as opus vittatum. The ashlars are well cut and arranged in horizontal courses. It has a window of considerable size crowned with a round arch made of roof tiles and fired-earth bricks, in a wall that reaches a height of 4 m. The exedra is a Roman building dating from the Lower Imperial period, very characteristic from the 3rd century onwards. Most villages of a certain size have chambers with these characteristics, and a markedly stately character.

Roman Sepulchre: In the same neighbourhood as Boadas, a small square Roman building from the 4th or 3rd century AD, with firm walls and a well-worked plinth. It had two storeys, the upper one supported by a semicircular arch. Today, it has been extensively rebuilt, and the gable roof has been completely rebuilt. Serra Ràfols considered the four silos inside to be Iberian. It is considered of the "chamber" and "cell" type within the Roman sepulchre typology.

=== Casa Amigant, Castellgalí Museum ===
Located next to the parish church of Sant Miquel. The beginning of history of this manor house can be traced back to documents from the end of the 17th century, but it probably existed before that. In 1673 Josep d'Amigant i FeIrer, first Count of Fonollar, bought the castle of Castellgalí from the Bolet family (who had also acquired the jurisdiction of the castle from the Rajadell family). This family of Manresa origin were the lords of Castellgalí until the abolition of feudal lordships by the Court of Cadiz. Josep d'Amigant i Ferrer took public possession of Castellgalí on October, 5th, 1673. In 1711 King Charles III granted him the title of Count of Fonollar. In 1684 he converted the building into a manor house, probably because the castle was in ruins, but he never lived there; when he modified the original structure he put his coat of arms on the façade. He favoured the Christian faith by having the relics of the town's patron saints carried and sold the plots of land along the royal road to form the town centre. His brother Francesc, canon and vicar general of Barcelona, gave the relics of San Honest on July, 27 of 1673 and made this saint and San Repelión co-patron saints of the town. In 1880, the heirs of the Amigants were the Despujol family, Marquises of Palmerola. It seems that the Amigants never lived in this house, in fact, in 1763 they rented the house of the Hostal to other people. Pere Playà Vilaseheir heir to the Cal Mas, bought the Amigant in 1873. The building now belongs to the Castellgalí Town Council. The museum was inaugurated in May, 5th of 1991; the Casal de Cultura was inaugurated in November, 25th of 2002. The part occupied by the social premises was the old Hostel Café of Castellgalí and its rooms were used for dances and film screenings at the beginning of the 20th century. Today, it houses the Youth Information Point, organises talks, has exhibition rooms and a computer room. On the front of the house (the west façade) we can see on the main lintel, the inscription 16IHS84 (1684 Iesus Hristus), under a cross; there is also, under a porthole, the coat of arms of the Amigant family. It is a coat of arms cut in stone, of a noble type with a central circle with two hands clasped in friendship. The outer part of the coat of arms is surrounded by scrolls that frame it, taped at the top by a standing human figure holding a feather in one hand and a wooden stick in the other.

=== Castle and chapel of Santa Maria ===
This castle had under its jurisdiction a term that must correspond to the current municipality, as even the area between the rivers Llobregat and Cardener already depended on it. The hilltop occupied by the castle had already been occupied previously, as fragments of Iberian pottery were found. The castle is documented as far back as924, when it was built by a character called Galí (Galindo), who would have owned the property in allodio. There is a documentary gap until 178, when we have a document that refers directly to the castle, the sale of the castle to King Alfonso I by Sibila, who had the castle as an inheritance from her ancestors. The king granted the castle in fief to a family whose surname was Castellgalí and who kept it until 130 when King Peter III sold several rights over the castle to his advisor Bernat de Torres de Manresa. Later, the King himself sold the charter of grace to Torres himself and all the jurisdiction of the castle, except criminal jurisdiction. The Torres family sold it to the Rajadell family in 1413, who kept the castle until 1563, when they sold it to the Amigant family. Josep d'AmigantIi Ferrer took possession of the castle of Castellgalí on October 5, 1673, with a public signing ceremony that took place in the town square, which was curious, given that feudalism, as a political and even social factor, had lost much of its importance at a time when all the inhabitants made the sacrament of fealty. The Amigants held the domain until the disappearance of the jurisdictional lordships in 1812. In 1970, a few amateurs and holidaymakers from the nearby housing estate carried out excavations without any method. They exhumed the remains of the castle which are still visible today. It seems that it was around 1473 that the castle was already in a bad state, as it was not inhabited and had been badly damaged after the Remença war. When it passed to the Amigants, instead of restoring the castle, they converted a house in the village, ca l'Amigant, formerly the Hostel, into a manor house, which they enlarged. The small church was located in the grounds of the castle of Castellgalí. It is mentioned in 1292, in the will of Berenguer Amatller written on December 27, 1292. It is not clear whether this chapel originally acted as a parish church or whether it only had the function of a castle chapel, which is why it is often called San Michael of the castle, with the same dedication as the parish church. In 1970, amateurs from the village also excavated the hill of the castle where the church is located and discovered the remains of the church. No archaeological material has been preserved. As a curious fact, we should mention that at the beginning of 1348, Guillema, wife of Berenguer of Castellgalí, died in the castle; she would have wanted to be buried in the convent of the Virgin of Carmen, in the city of Manresa but, because of the "mortalities and pestilentias multas" (it means: "the great mortality and pestilence"), she was buried in the castle church.

=== Church of Saint Michael of Castellgalí ===
In the centre of the old town. It is a church with two aisles, the central one wider and larger than the side one on the right-hand side. They are covered with an imitation ogival vault made of brick. At the point where the ribs of the vaults cross, there are six keystones with an ornamental function. Four pillars, supported by segmental arches, separate the central nave from the side nave. Below the roof, there are a series of rounded windows that, together with the porthole in the façade, contribute to the illumination of the building. A moulding below the windows runs along all the walls of the nave. On the left side there are four chapels, defined by pilasters that protrude slightly from the wall. The doorway is in the Neo-Gothic style with pointed archivolts. The church has a quadrangular bell tower with a square ground plan and a belvedere at the top. The façade is plastered, but has a well-cut stone plinth; the rest of the structure is made of rather irregular ashlars. The main door opens to the west, at the crossroads of Saint Anthony, Manresa and Saint Margaret street. The doorway has a pointed arch sculptural decoration on the tympanum and double archivolt, and above it is a porthole. On the ceiling of the lateral nave there is a medallion with the two patron saints, Saint Honest and Saint Repelion.

== Local festivals ==
=== Aplec [Meeting] of Saint Margaret ===
This festival on the third weekend of October was revived on 19 October 1992 by the Friends of the Museum. The festival, held before the Civil War, and occurred for the last time in July 1935. People used to walk up to the hermitage, stopping at the Creu del Pla. A mass was held and the Gozos de Santa Margarita was sung; people brought their lunch and ate it around the hermitage. Since the recovery, improvements have been made to the surroundings: the rubble was removed and the interior of the chapel was cleared, and in 1993 the sculptor Bori gave it a new image of Santa Margarida. Steps have been made to facilitate access, the esplanade has been levelled, the presbytery has been paved, a new altar has been built and the door has been barred. Nowadays, the Aplec consists of a 30-minute walk from the old part of the village to the hermitage, a participative aperitif (participants bring something from home to share with everyone), a meal, a mass, an accordion or singing concert, various events for children (sack races, piñata...) and a snack.

=== Elders' Festival ===
This festival is held on the third weekend in February. A morning mass is held and the traditional Castellgalí dwarfs are brought out to dance, considered the biggest dwarfs in Catalonia, called Margarida (the adult female figure), Quela (the smaller female figure) and the Repel-lió (the male figure). In the Plaça Cadevall, there is a popular juried cake competition, promoted by the Friends of the Museum. There are prizes and a raffle. Finally, all the elderly people of the village eat a meal.

=== Festival of the "Panellet" (Bread Roll) ===
This festival has been held since 1968 on the first weekend in May, as after the closure of the Cal Carné factory in 1963, it forced many villagers to look for work outside the village. It used to be celebrated on 8 May, which corresponds to the day of the apparition of Saint Michael the Archangel, a date that coincides with the start of the summer agricultural and livestock work, which, according to tradition, ends on September 29. The central traditional act of this festivity takes at Sunday mass: the blessing of the panellets. These are bread rolls, not to be confused with the panellets of the Castanyada, spherical sweets made of ground almonds, sugar and pine nuts. The panellets are distributed after mass. After this solemn service (and in others, such as the Festa Major), the Panellet dance was danced, a dance that has been recovered through the work of the Friends of the Museum. Tradition tells us that if you keep a blessed panellist at home until the next panellet festival, during that year, the bread will never be lacking in your home. Various activities have been integrated throughout the weekend, the "Ruta del Zorro", food market, various athletic competitions, demonstrations of old trades, gastronomic workshops, sculptors' meeting and sculpture exhibition, and children's games.

=== Festa Major [Main Festival] ===
Currently, this festival is celebrated the first weekend of August, and the following Monday is a local holiday. It is worth mentioning the popular botifarrada (fresh grilled sausages) with a show, the events of the Fiesta Joven (Youth Festival) and the Fiesta Mayor dances. Children's entertainment is organised in the different population centres of the municipality. Originally, the festival was dedicated to the co-patron saints Sant Honest and Sant Repel·lió and was held on the first weekend in September. The peasants prayed to these saints to protect their crops.

== Economy and demographics ==
The average gross income in the municipality of Castellgalí stood at €28,864 in 2019, which places the municipality in 380th place in the ranking of declared gross income in Spain, according to the data made public by the Spanish Tax Agency, which only includes towns with more than 1,000 inhabitants. Compared to 2018, the average income of Castellgalí had grown by 1,188 euros (4.29%) in 2019.

The population (castellgalins or castellgalinenses) has fluctuated a lot over the years. After a significant decline throughout the second half of the 19th century, there was an increase that reached its peak in 1960, after which the population gradually declined until 1996, when it continued to grow until the present day: in 1986 the population was 705 and in 1991 it was 702. In 1996 there were 782 h in 2005, 1,282 h, in 2021, 2119 h. Today the number is close to 2.300 inhabitants.

Agriculture in the municipality is predominantly rain-fed. The main crops are barley, vegetables and olives. Livestock farming is quite rich, specialising mainly in the breeding of pigs, chickens and cows.

As for the industrial sector, the first company to set up in the municipality, in 1898, was the electric coal factory of Climent Asols y Bovets. Incorporated in 1902 as the Companyia Fabril de Carbons Elèctrics, it was also the first in the state. The Great War gave a strong boost to the company's activities and in 1914 it won a tender for the sale of electric coals for the lighting of Glasgow and Melbourne. The factory's products were marketed under the name Claret. The company as such no longer exists, but various industries have been established on its premises. The six chimneys remain and it is the only factory in Spain with this many chimneys. Among the other companies in the municipality, is a quarry company.

The municipality currently has six industrial estates (Els Torrents, La Fàbrica, Boades, Els Carbures, Cal Carné and Pla del Camí), the latter built at the end of the 1990s.

1900	1930	1950	1970	1986	2007
775	1009	887	1033	705	1611
