= Sant Salvador de Guardiola =

- Municipality
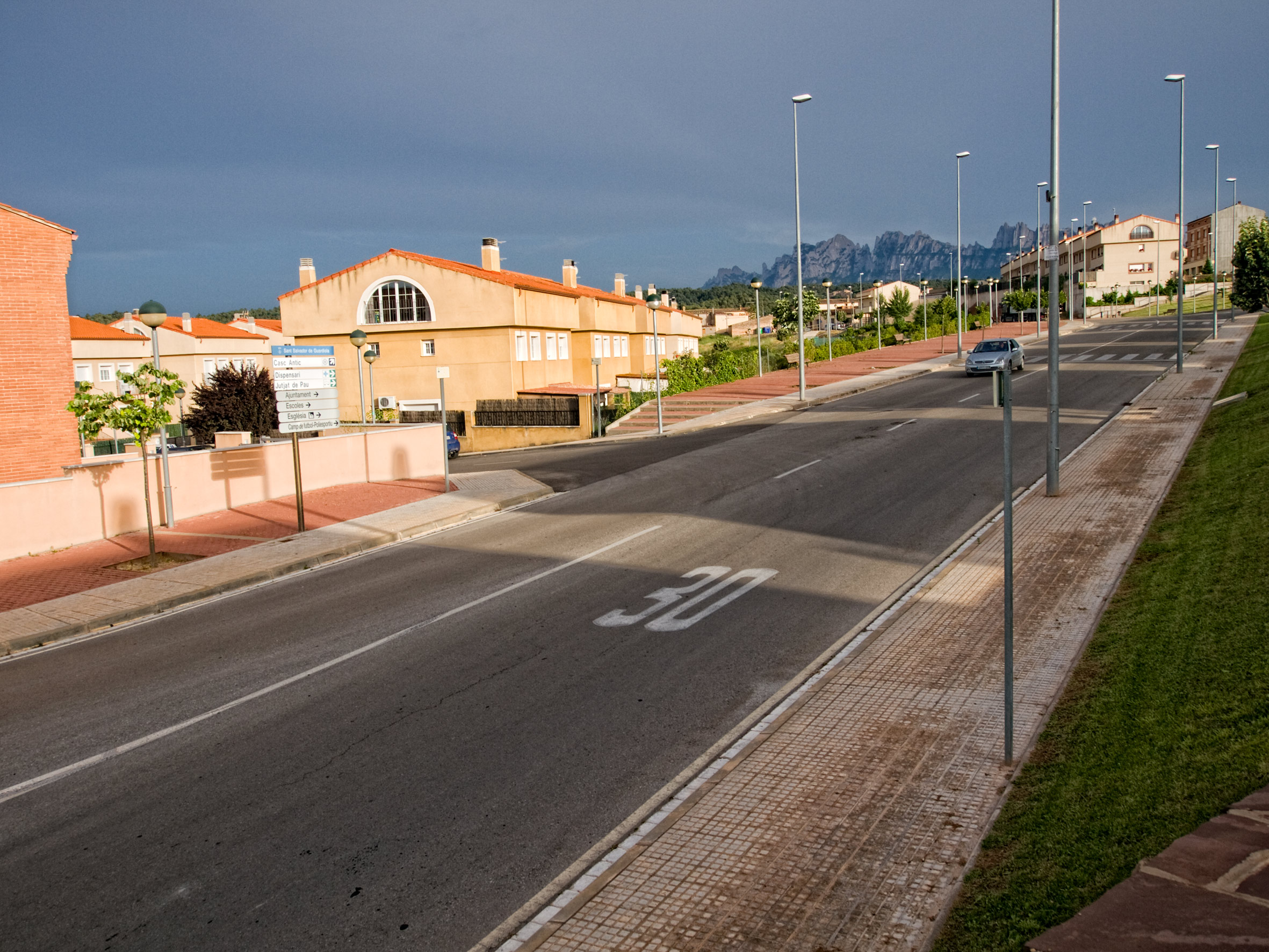
- Sant Salvador de Guardiola with Montserrat behind

- Coat of arms

- Location in Catalonia Sant Salvador de Guardiola (Spain)
- Coordinates: 41°40′48″N 1°45′59″E
- Country: Spain
- Community: Catalonia
- Province: Barcelona
- Comarca: Bages

Government
  - Mayor: Albert Miralda Sellarés (2015)

Area
  - Total: 37.2 km^{2} (14.4 sq mi)

Population (2025-01-01)
  - Total: 3,612
  - Density: 97.1/km^{2} (251/sq mi)
- Website: santsalvadordeguardiola.cat

Sant Salvador de Guardiola (Catalan pronunciation: [ˈsan səlβəˈðo ðə ɣwəɾðiˈɔlə]) is a village in the comarca of Bages of the province of Barcelona and autonomous community of Catalonia, Spain. The municipality covers an area of 13.2 square kilometres (5.1 sq mi) and the population in 2014 was 3,130.
