= Singular population entity =

Spanish statistical unit of human settlements

From a statistical point of view, in Spain, a singular population entity (in Spanish: entidad singular de población) is defined as "any inhabited area within a municipality, inhabited or exceptionally uninhabited, clearly differentiated within that municipality and that is known by a specific name that identifies it without the possibility of confusion", according to the definition of the National Statistics Institute.

== Population entities ==
The gazetteer published by the INE, usually on the dates when the population census was carried out, distinguishes, within each municipality, the following population entities, each of which has a delimited territorial scope.

- Collective population entity (in Spanish: Entidad colectiva de población): a grouping of two or more singular population entities.
- Singular population entity (in Spanish: Entidad singular de población): any inhabited area of a municipality, inhabited or exceptionally uninhabited, clearly differentiated within the municipality and known by a specific denomination that identifies it without the possibility of confusion.
- Population nucleus (in Spanish: Núcleo de población): is a group of at least ten buildings that form streets, squares and other urban roads. By exception, the number of buildings may be less than 10, as long as the population that inhabits them exceeds 50 inhabitants. The nucleus includes those buildings that, being isolated, are less than 200 meters from the outer limits of the aforementioned complex, although in determining this distance, land occupied by industrial or commercial facilities, parks, gardens, sports areas, cemeteries, parking lots and others, as well as canals or rivers that may be crossed by bridges, must be excluded.
- Scattered (in Spanish: Diseminados): These are buildings -inhabited or not- that do not meet the conditions established to form a population nucleus.

The singular population entity can be constituted by several population nuclei, in addition to scattered. If there is no population nucleus within the singular population entity, it is formed by the existing scattered areas in its territory.

Each singular population entity has a category that is the qualification granted, or traditionally recognized, such as city, town, lugar or village, and in the absence thereof, the one that responds to its origin and characteristics, such as baserri, settlement, barrio, monastery, tourist center, residential area, urbanization and others.

Similarly, a population nucleus corresponds to one of the following categories: city, town, lugar or hamlet, settlement, barrio, residential area, urbanization.

Some collective population entities receive, according to the legislation of each Autonomous Community, the consideration of local Entity of territorial scope inferior to the municipality foreseen in the Local Regime Law; these entities according to this law do not have legal personality, and according to the autonomous legislation can receive their own denominations: in the autonomous legislation they can receive other denominations such as hamlets, parishes, villages, barrios, elizates, concejos, pedanías, annexed places and other analogous ones. In Alava and Navarre, these entities are called councils and, in accordance with the corresponding legislation, have legal personality.

== INE code of entities and population nuclei ==
The entities and population nuclei have been codified by the National Institute of Statistics since 1981. This code is made up of 11 digits:

- The first two for the province;
- The third, fourth and fifth for the municipality within the province;
- The sixth and seventh for the collective entity within the municipality, if it exists. Otherwise "00" is used;
- The eighth and ninth for the singular entity within the collective entity or the municipality, if the collective entity does not exist; and
- The last two for the population nuclei within the singular entity, using "99" for the scattered.

Thus, for example, code 33016022002 refers to:

	Entity	Type of entity	Complete code
33	Asturias	province	33
016	Concejo de Castrillón	municipality	33 016 000000
02	Parroquia de Laspra;	collective population entity	33 016 020000
20	Arnao	singular population entity	33 016 022000
02	La Mina	population nucleus	33 016 022002

The codes were re-established in 1991 following the alphabetical order of the population nucleus within each singular entity. Newly created entities are assigned a code correlative to the last existing one, and those that disappear are not reused. The municipalities must review, at least once a year, the list of entidades and population nuclei and send it to the National Statistics Institute, which publishes it annually.

This list serves as the basis for the preparation of the municipal census of inhabitants.

== See also ==
- Minor local entity

== Bibliography ==
- García Sanz, Benjamín (1994). "Alcance y significado de las entidades singulares de población como concepto para cuantificar la población rural" [Scope and Significance of Singular Population Entities as a Concept to Quantify the Rural Population] (PDF). Revista de Estudios Agrosociales (in Spanish) (168): 199–234. ISSN 0034-8155.
- González Polledo, Luis Alfonso (2005). "El Nomenclátor de 1986 como fuente documental" [The 1986 Nomenclator as a documentary source]. Polígonos. Revista de Geografía (in Spanish) (1): 181–192. doi:10.18002/pol.v0i1.1281. hdl:10612/8150. ISSN 2444-0272.
